= Sobrado at No. 2 Rua Ana Nery =

House in Cachoeira, Bahia

- Casa à Rua Ana Nery, 2
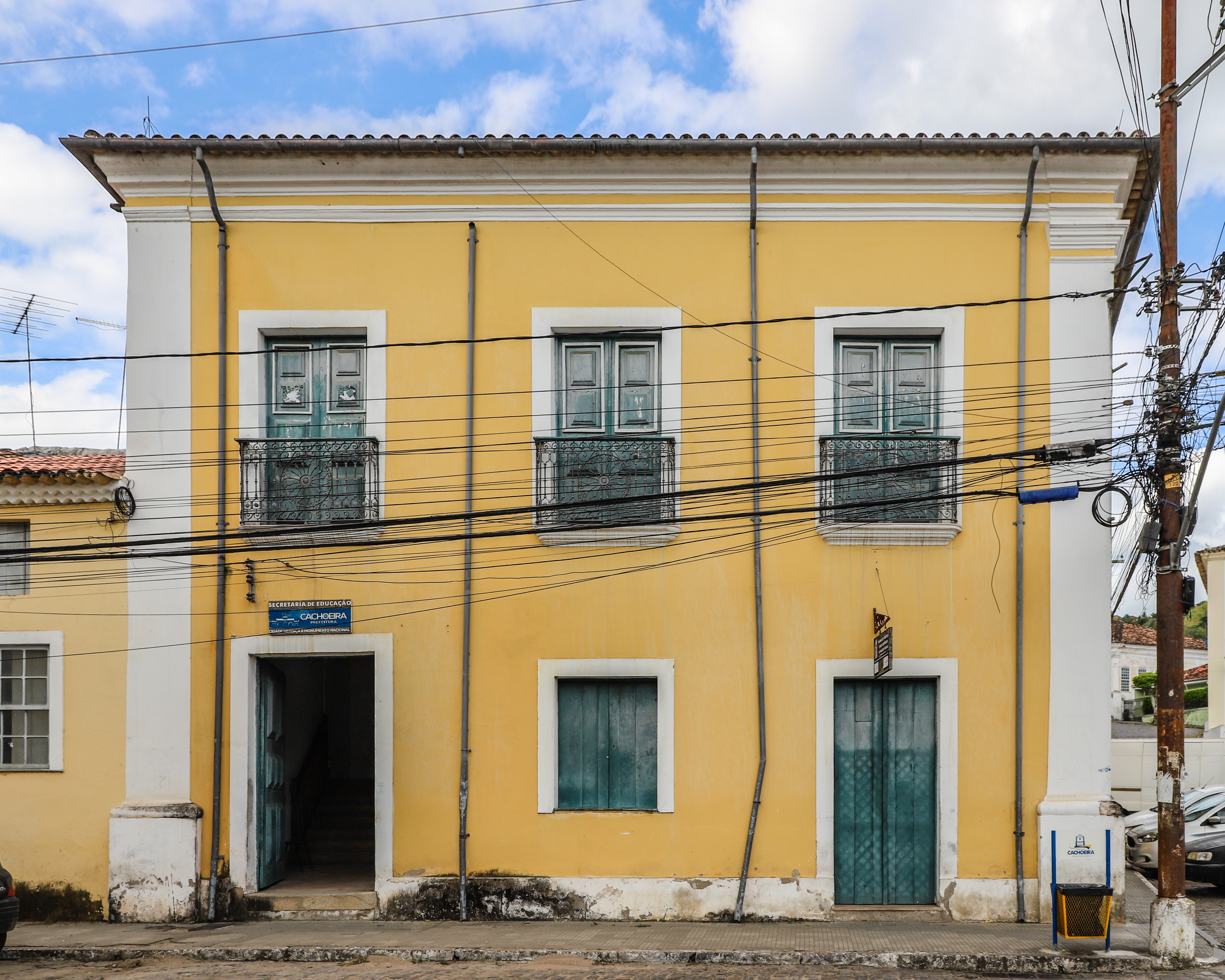
- Sobrado at No. 2 Rua Ana Nery, Cachoeira, Bahia

- Location within Brazil

General information
- Location: Rua Ana Nery, no. 2, Cachoeira, Bahia, Brazil
- Coordinates: 12.60503°S 38.96253°W

Technical details
- Floor count: 3
- Floor area: 680 square metres (7,300 ft^{2})

National Historic Heritage of Brazil
- Designated: 1943
- Reference no.: 245

Sobrado at No. 2 Rua Ana Nery (Portuguese: Sobrado à Rua Ana Nery Nº 2 is a Portuguese-colonial era sobrado, or urban manor house, in Cachoeira, Bahia, Brazil. It was constructed in the early 18th century by a wealthy family, and has a privileged location in the town: it is a corner sobrado; opens to Praça Aclamação, the historic public square; and has views of the Town Hall of Cachoeira, the House of Prayer of the Carmelite Third Order, and the Church of Our Lady of Mount Carmel. The sobrado covers 680 square metres (7,300 ft^{2}) and consists of two levels and a small attic (mezanino). It was listed as a historic structure by the National Institute of Historic and Artistic Heritage in 1943. The Sobrado at No. 2 Rua Ana Nery houses two town government offices: the Secretary of Tourism on the ground floor, and the Secretary of Education of Cachoeira on the upper floor.

== Location ==
The Sobrado at No. 2 Rua Ana Nery is located on a street that connects Praça da Aclamação, the main public square of Cachoeira, with Praça Doutor Aristides Milton. It is adjacent to House at No. 4 Rua Ana Nery, a small, vernacular home of the 19th century, which covers only 122 square metres (1,310 ft^{2}). The House at No. 2 has a privileged position at the corner of the public square and Rua Ana Nery; it additionally faces a broad square towards the Paraguaçu River.

== History ==
The Sobrado at No. 2 Rua Ana Nery was built in the 18th century as part of the development of the city center around Praça da Aclamação. The Town Hall and Jail was completed in 1700s; construction of sobrados of wealthy families followed soon after. The Sobrado at No. 2 is included as a part of the Historic Center of Cachoeira.

== Structure ==
The Sobrado at No. 2 Rua Ana Nery has an irregular floor plan, a result of the limited size of small corner plot in an urban setting. It is constructed of self-supporting mixed masonry walls of stone and brick. Internal partitions of the house are of wood. The sobrado has a four doors that opens to the square with four windows above, and two doors that open to Rua Ana Nery with three windows above. The windows on the upper floor are rectangular with latticed shutters and elaborate iron balconets. The elaborate portals and windows of the sobrado, have straight lintels and mortar borders, are in contrast to the adjacent House at No. 4, which has a simple door and a single sash window on the ground floor.

The ground floor the Sobrado at No. 2 has an irregular, trapezoidal plan and consists of four large rooms on the ground floor and six smaller rooms on the upper floor. A small corridor leads to the stairs from a door on Rua Ana Nery. The upper floor has a flat, wooden ceiling; the front corner room has a coffered ceiling. The sobrado, like many others of the colonial period, has a small attic, or 'mezanino'. It probably served both as a bedroom for women family members, and as a room to use during the frequent flooding of the Paraguaçu River.

== Protected status ==
The House at No. 2 Rua Ana Nery was listed as a protected historic site by the National Institute of Historic and Artistic Heritage in 1943 under inscription number 245.

== Access ==
The sobrado functions as a municipal government building. The tourist office on the ground floor is open to the public and may be visited.
