= Terreiro Zogbodo Male Bogun Seja Unde =

Candomblé temple in Cachoeira

Zogbodo Male Bogun Seja Unde
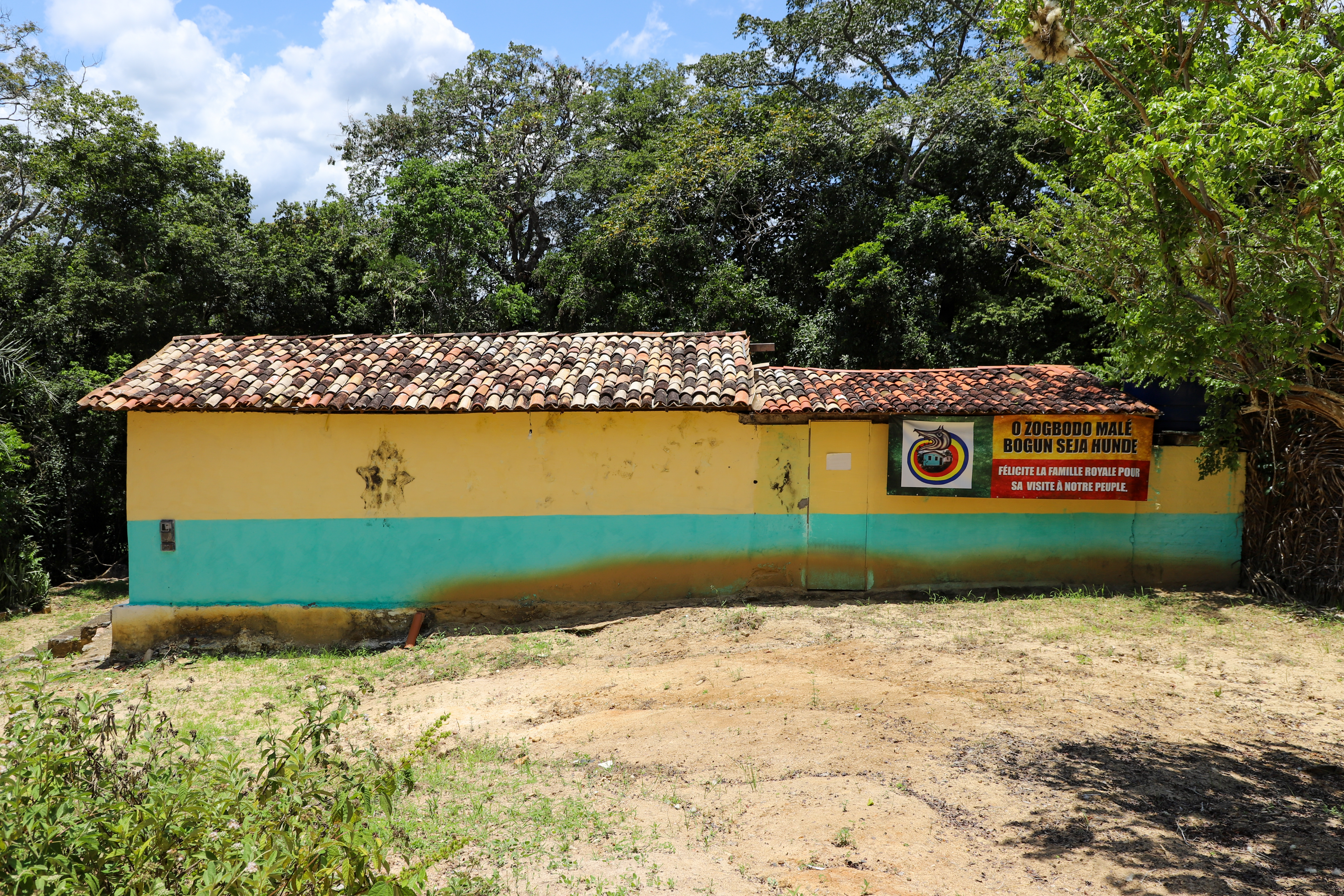
- Zogbodo Male Bogun Seja Unde, Cachoeira, Bahia, Brazil

- Location of Zogbodo Male Bogun Seja Unde in Brazil

Religion
- Affiliation: Candomblé
- Sect: Jeje
- Year consecrated: 1858

Location
- Municipality: Cachoeira
- State: Bahia
- Country: Brazil
- Interactive map of Zogbodo Male Bogun Seja Unde
- Coordinates: 12.997081°S 38.494881°W

Architecture
- Founder: Eugênia Ana dos Santos

National Historic Heritage of Brazil
- Designated: 2011
- Reference no.: 1627

Zogbodo Male Bogun Seja Unde, also known as Terreiro Roça do Ventura, is a Candomblé terreiro (temple) in Cachoeira, Bahia, Brazil. It was founded in 1858, and is the first terreiro founded by Africans of Jeje (Ewe) origin. It is located in the Cabula neighborhood on Rua de São Gonçalo do Retiro, a winding rural road associated with numerous Candomblé terreiros. It is led by Alaíde Augusta da Conceição, also known as Alaíde de Oyá. Zogbodo Male Bogun Seja Unde received heritage status from the Brazilian National Historic and Artistic Heritage Institute (IPHAN) in 2014, and is the first listed terreiro of the Jeje tradition.

== History ==
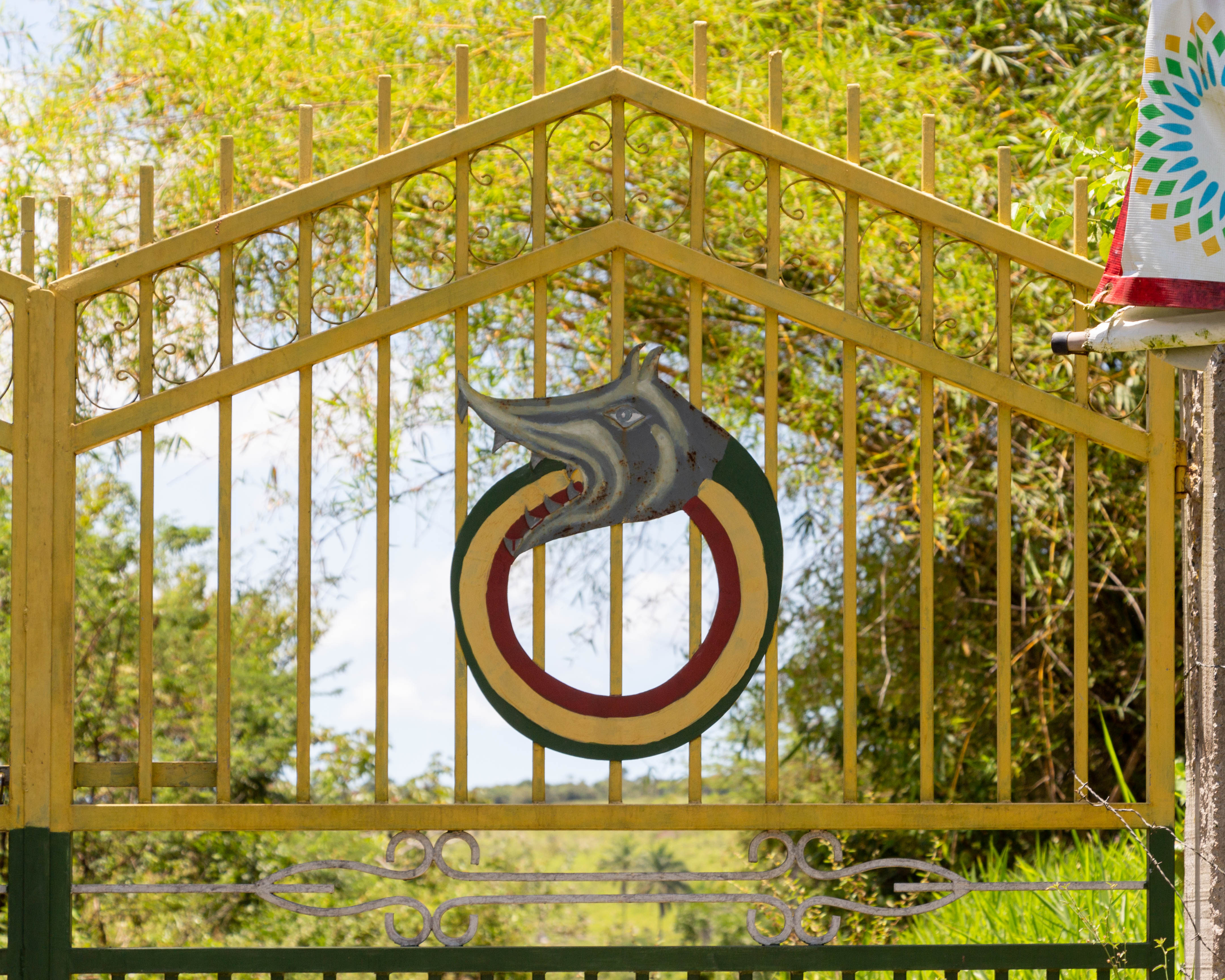
Entrance gate, Zogbodo Male Bogun Seja Unde (Terreiro Roça do Ventura)

Zogbodo Male Bogun Seja Unde was founded by Maria Luísa Gonsaga (Maria Ogorensi). She was the "saint-daughter" of Ludovina Pessoa, a central religious figure of Jeje Candomblé. Ludovina was of Mahi origin, a small ethnic group of modern-day Togo. Maria Ogorensi was possibly initiated by Ludovina in a terreiro that operated at Fazenda Altamira, also in Cachoeira.

Maria Ogorensi left Fazenda Altamira to found her own terreiro while Ludovina was still alive. Her motivation to found a new terreiro is unknown, but Jeje oral tradition rules out any type of conflict or misunderstanding. Maria Ogorensi founded Zogbodo Male Bogun Seja Unde on the land of her husband, Manoel Ventura Esteves, from which the nickname "Roça do Ventura" emerged. Another nickname born in the 19th century was that of "Roça de Baixo", or lower farm, in opposition to the terreiro of Fazenda Altamira, which was nicknamed "Roça de Cima", or upper farm.

Maria Ogorensi was initiated into the vodun Bessén, and consecrated the terreiro to him. Ludovina Pessoa passed away in the late 19th century, and the terreiro at Fazenda Altamira declined due to the age of its membership or lack of leadership. The terreiro at Fazenda Altamira closed and its members joined Zogbodo Male Bogun Seja Unde, still under the leadership of Maria Ogorensi.

Zogbodo Male Bogun Seja Unde preserves the traditions and liturgy of the Jeje-Mahi sect of Candomblé. "Jeje" refers to people of Ewe) origin, brought from Ghana, Togo, or southeast Nigeria to slavery in Brazil. Its deities are referred to as vodum. Zogbodo Male Bogun Seja Unde shares a common lineage with Zoogodô Bogum Malê Rundó, a Jeje-Candomblé terreiro in Salvador.

A forest fire in Cachoeira in 2009 destroyed parts of the forests around the terreiro; it spared the sacred vegetation and terreiro structures.

== Grounds and structures ==
Zogbodo Male Bogun Seja Unde consists of several small buildings on a large plot of land in a rural area outside of Cachoeira. The main structure is the Casas de Hospedagem, which consists of the oiá, or altar; peji, or ceremonial meeting hall; and a kitchen for the preparation for sacred foods.

The terreiro also has a Casa dos Antepassados, or house of the ancestors; a Fonte de Oxum, or fountain dedicated to the deity Oshun; a poço, or bridge. Altars are placed at sacred trees dedicated to Nana Buluku, Tiriri, Ogum Eroquê, Avequité, Zogbo, Bessém, Ajuzum, Lokó, Badé, Aqué, and Parara.

== Heritage status ==
Zogbodo Male Bogun Seja Unde received heritage status by the National Institute of Historic and Artistic Heritage (IPHAN) in 2014.
