= House at No. 17 Rua Benjamin Constant =

House in Salvador, Bahia

- Casa à Rua Benjamin Constant, 17
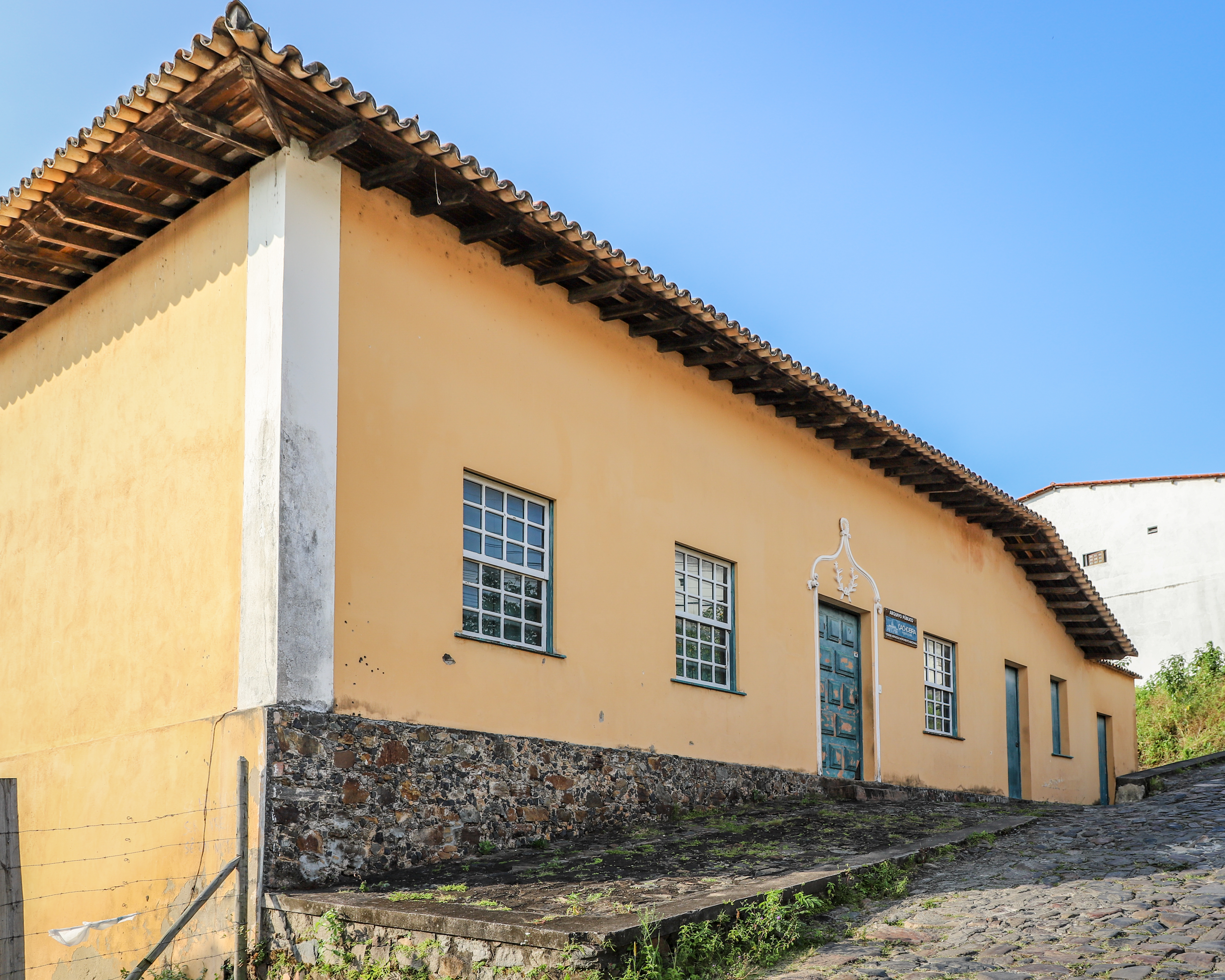
- House at No. 17 Rua Benjamin Constant, Cachoeira, Bahia

- Location within Brazil

General information
- Location: Rua Benjamin Constant, no. 17, Cachoeira, Bahia, Brazil
- Coordinates: 12.604312°S 38.961501°W

Technical details
- Floor count: 2
- Floor area: 412.45

National Historic Heritage of Brazil
- Designated: 1941
- Reference no.: 244

House at No. 17 Rua Benjamin Constant (Portuguese: Casa à Rua Benjamin Constant, 17, or Casa à Ladeira da Cadeia, 17) is a former home and archive building in Cachoeira, Brazil. Its date of construction is unknown but is likely between the end of the 18th century and beginning of the 19th century. The house is noted for its latticed balcony at its rear façade, which provides a view of Cachoeira, its neighboring municipality Sao Felix, and the Paraguaçu River. The house was listed as a historic structure by the National Institute of Historic and Artistic Heritage in 1941; it now functions as the archives of the municipality of Cachoeira and may be visited.

== Location ==
The House at No. 17 Rua Benjamin Constant is located on the slope above the Historic Center of Cachoeira, directly behind the Town Hall of Cachoeira (Paço Municipal) of the city, which was completed in 1712. Houses built around the town hall and its square occupied a privileged position in Cachoeira; the House at No. 17 Rua Benjamin Constant can be included in this group. The house sits on the corner of Rua Benjamin Constant and the narrow Beco do Cazuzinha.

== History ==
The date of construction of this building is unknown. Its location and typology indicates a period of construction between the late 18th and early 19th centuries. No information exists on who constructed the house or its early residents. The first known resident was the Bahian musician José Joaquim de Souza Aragão (1819-1904), better known as Cazuzinha, who owned the house from 1900 to 1904. It was later owned by Francelino Motta, a member of the locally politically connected Motta family. The house was listed as a historic property by National Institute of Historic and Artistic Heritage (IPHAN) in 1941.

Francelino Motta offered to sell the house to the federal government in 1958 and requested that IPHAN carry out restoration work in 1959. It was instead sold to Pedro Angelo José Ghislandi, an engineer employed by IPHAN, in 1963. The house was jointly purchased from Ghislandi by the Federal University of Bahia, the state government of Bahia, and IPHAN in 1982 to create a regional archive; work on its adaptive reuse was completed in 1966. It became home to the municipal archives of Cachoeira in 2018. The municipal archives were moved from the Teixeira de Freitas Birthplace (Casa natal de Teixeira de Freitas) due to its state of disrepair and location close to the river, which is subject to periodic flooding.

== Structure ==
The house is built on a slope, with a single story facing Rua Benjamin Constant and two stories that overlook the steep slope at rear. Various construction materials were used on the house, reflecting its renovation at different times: it is constructed partly of stone and lime and partly in wood on a stone foundation. The house was erected with a rectangular main body; a service side wing was added at a later date. The service side wing is unique to houses in Cachoeira. The front façade of the house has a main entrance door, side entrance door, and sash windows. The windows sit on simple lintels, as does the single window of the service wing. The door has tracings in stucco above and around the main entrance. A gable roof slopes from front to back and covers the balcony.

The back façade of the house consists of two floors and faces a slope. The structure is noted for its covered balcony with latticed wood railing. The balcony provides a view of the city of Cachoeira, the Paraguaçu River, and its neighboring city, São Félix, across the river. The latticed balcony at the rear of a residence is found in two other structures Cachoeira: the Sobrado at Praça da Aclamação, 4 and Solar Estrela; the house may be modeled after the Casa do Conde da Palma in Salvador. The back façade of the building has two doors and a straight lintel window, two columns, and masonry corner wedges. In total the house covers 412.45 square metres (4,439.6 ft^{2}).

The interior of the house is simple. None of its original furnishing or decor remains.

== Protected status ==
The House at No. 17 Rua Benjamin Constant was listed as a protected historic site by the National Institute of Historic and Artistic Heritage in 1941 under inscription number 202.

== Access ==
The house now functions as an archive for the municipality of Cachoeira and may be visited.
