= Gruna da Parede Vermelha =

Coordinates: 12°52′43″S 41°18′59″W

Gruna da Parede Vermelya is a cave located in the municipality of Andaraí, in the Brazilian State of Bahia. It is part of the Chapada Diamantina National Park, on the Sincura mountain range. It was formed during the Proterozoic.

== See also ==
- List of caves in Brazil
