= Engenho Vitória =

19th-century sugarcane mill in Bahia, Brazil

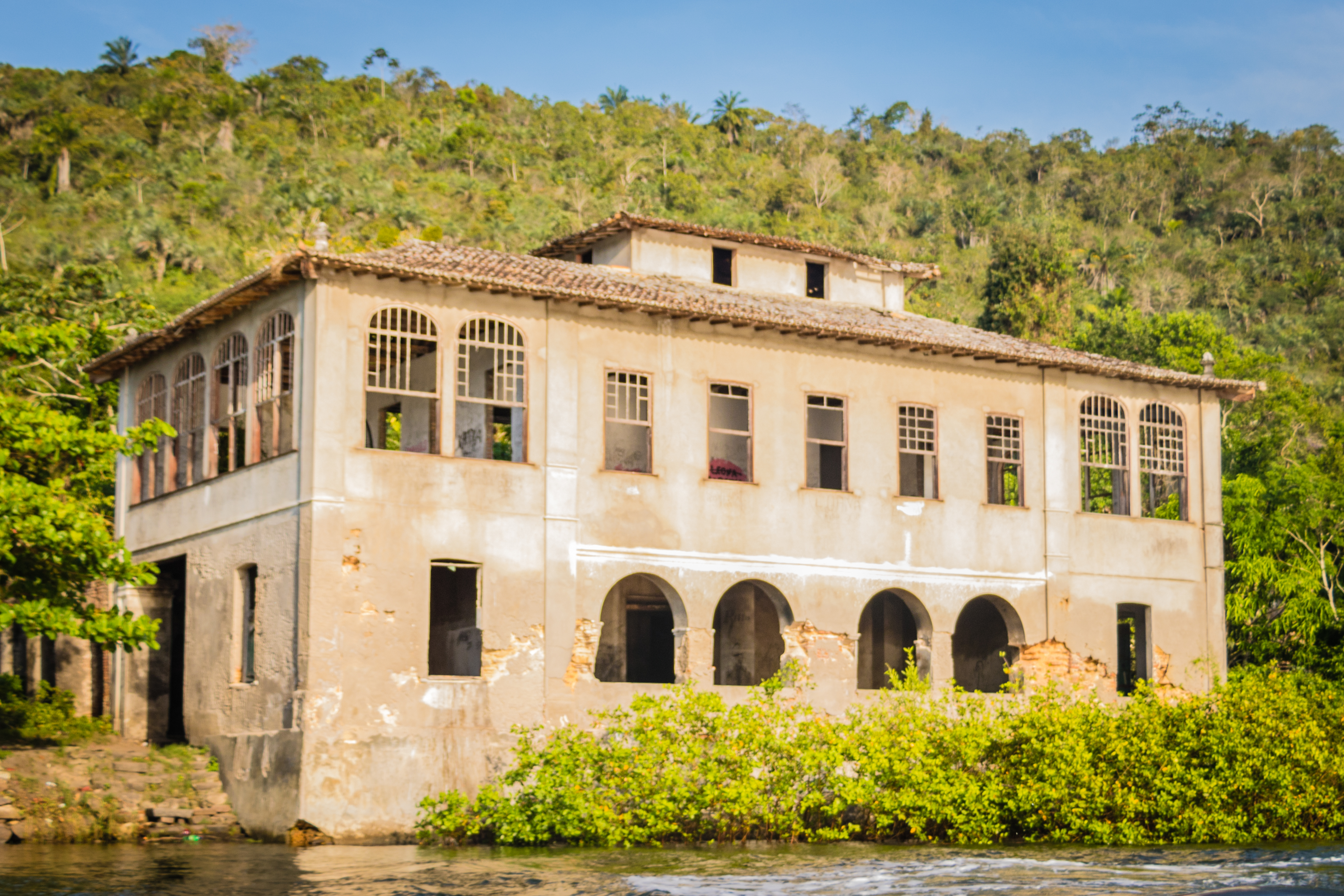
- Engenho Vitória in 2017.

- Location of Engenho Vitória in Brazil
- Alternative names: Vitória Sugar Mill

General information
- Type: Engenho
- Location: Countryside of Cachoeira, Bahia, Brazil
- Coordinates: 12°39′44″S 38°56′26″W
- Construction started: 1812

Engenho Vitória is a sugarcane mill founded in the nineteenth century, located on the banks of the Paraguaçu River in the countryside of Cachoeira, Bahia, Brazil.

== History ==
The year 1812 marks the beginning of the construction of Engenho Vitória, on the banks of the Paraguaçu River, an important watercourse in Bahia, near Cachoeira. The work was sponsored by the Commander Pedro Bandeira, an important merchant of his time and one of the pioneers in the use of steam navigation in Bahia.

Built in the period of Colonial Brazil, the Engenho building is connected to the slavery process in Brazil, as it was a place that used slave labor during its operation as a sugar business. The mill consists of a three-level sobrado, based on an architectural project that imagined the construction of the building with a "T" shape. The building includes covered access between the engenho and the sobrado. There is also a marble hall, chapel, storage room and a room for the slaves. The building also has an attic – later renovated and expanded. The property also mentions Bandeira's family, with references to his family on the door and the Muniz family coat of arms carved in marble.

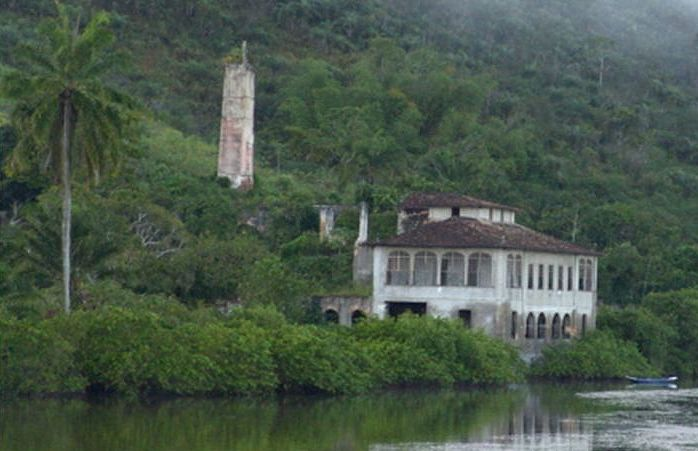
Engenho Vitória in 2013.

== Heritage register ==
In 1943, the mill underwent the process of historical listing with the National Institute of Historic and Artistic Heritage (IPHAN), the organization responsible for historical preservation linked to the Federal Government.

== See also ==
- Slavery in Brazil
- Trapiche
- Sugarcane mill
- Empire of Brazil
- Bahia
- List of National Historic Heritage sites of Brazil
