= Cachoeira =

Municipality of Bahia, Brazil

- Municipality
- Municipality of Cachoeira
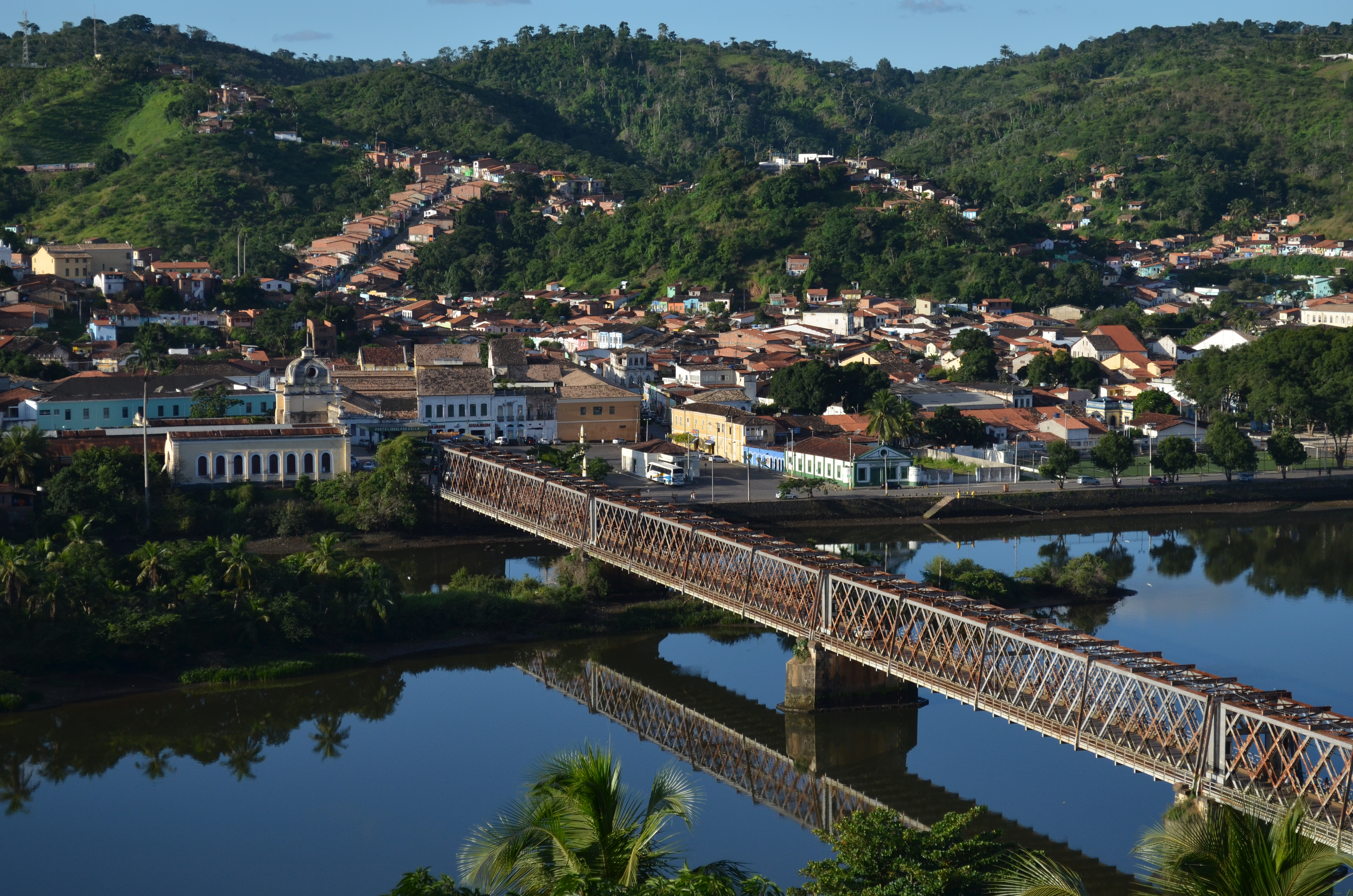
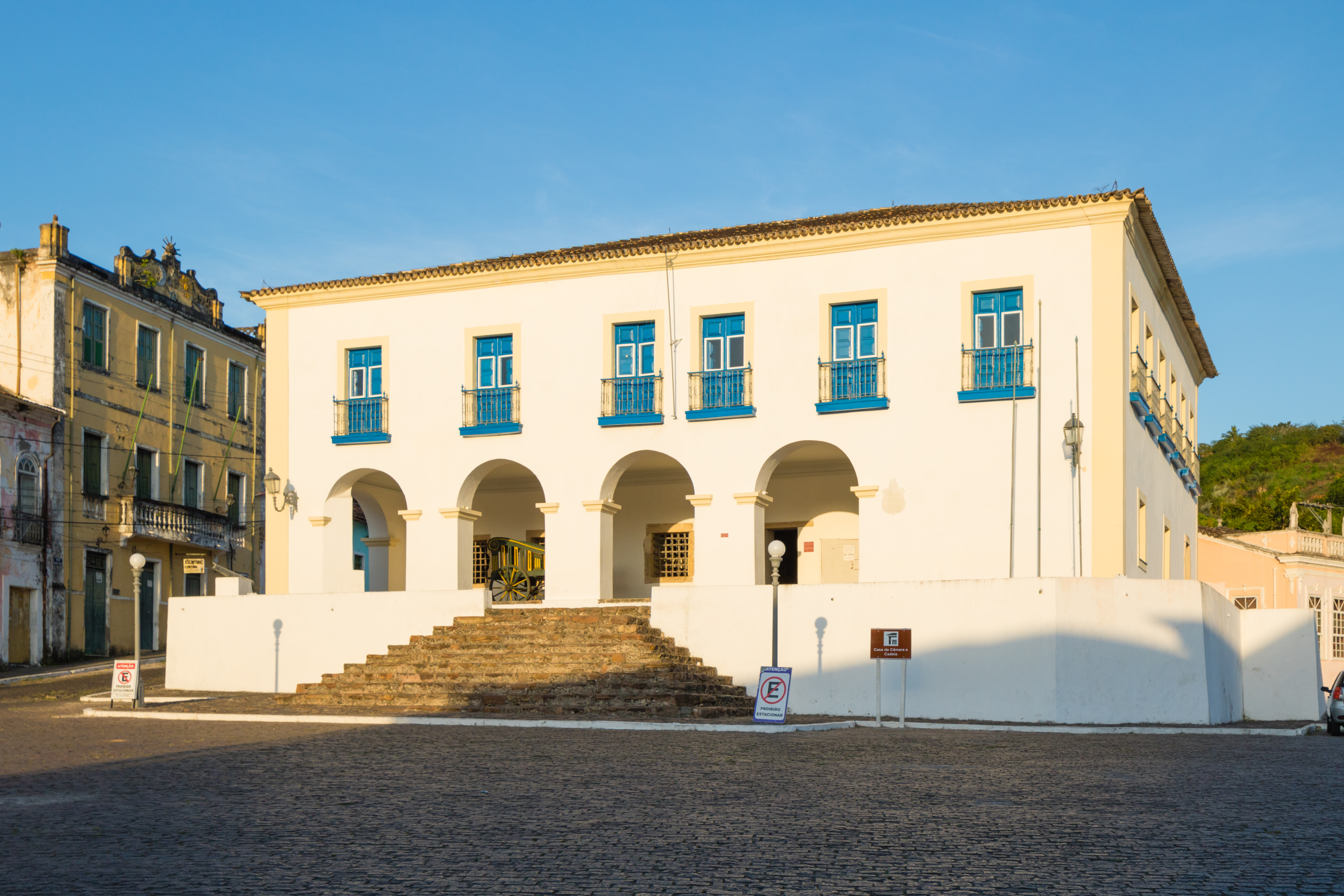
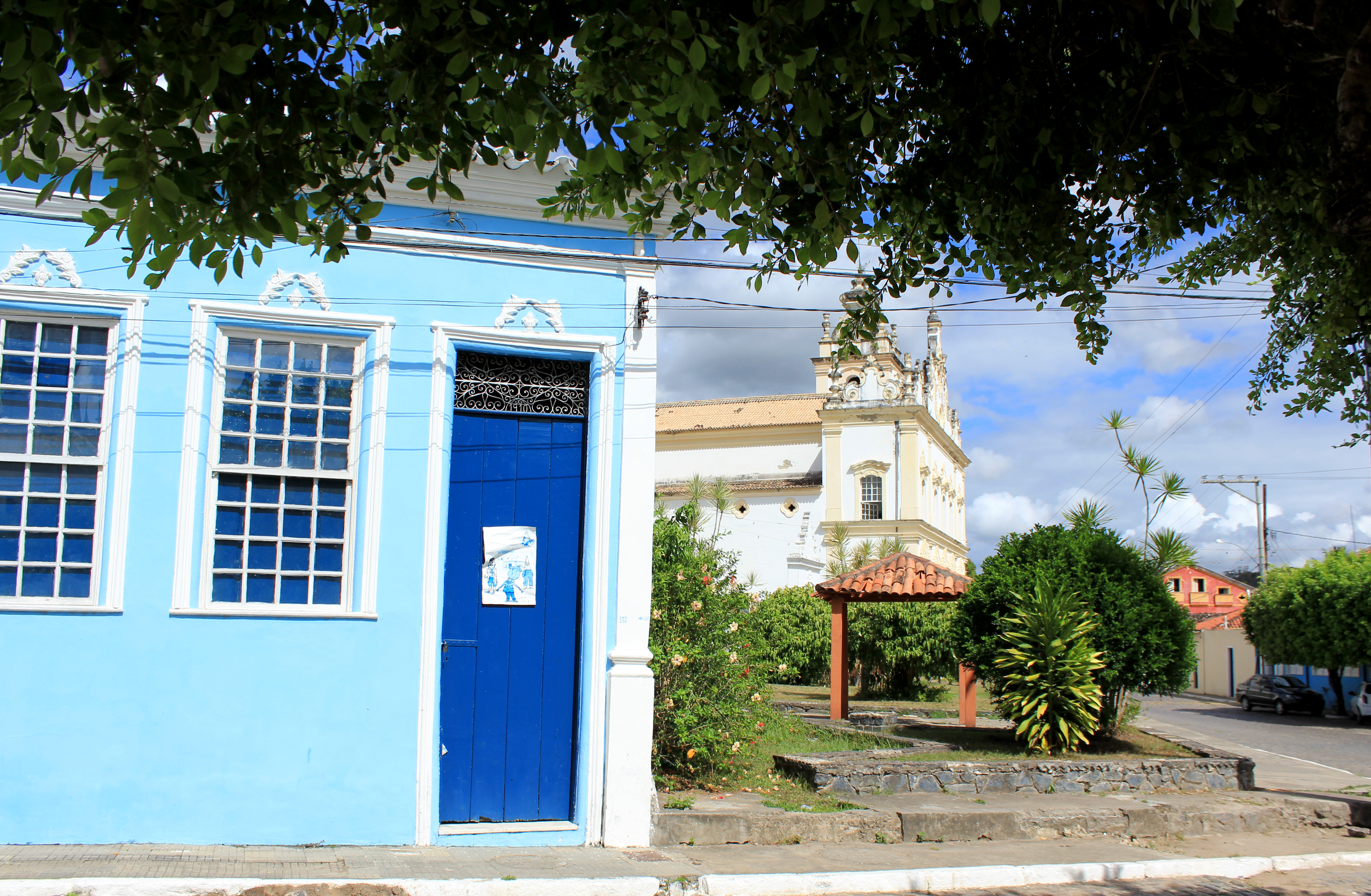
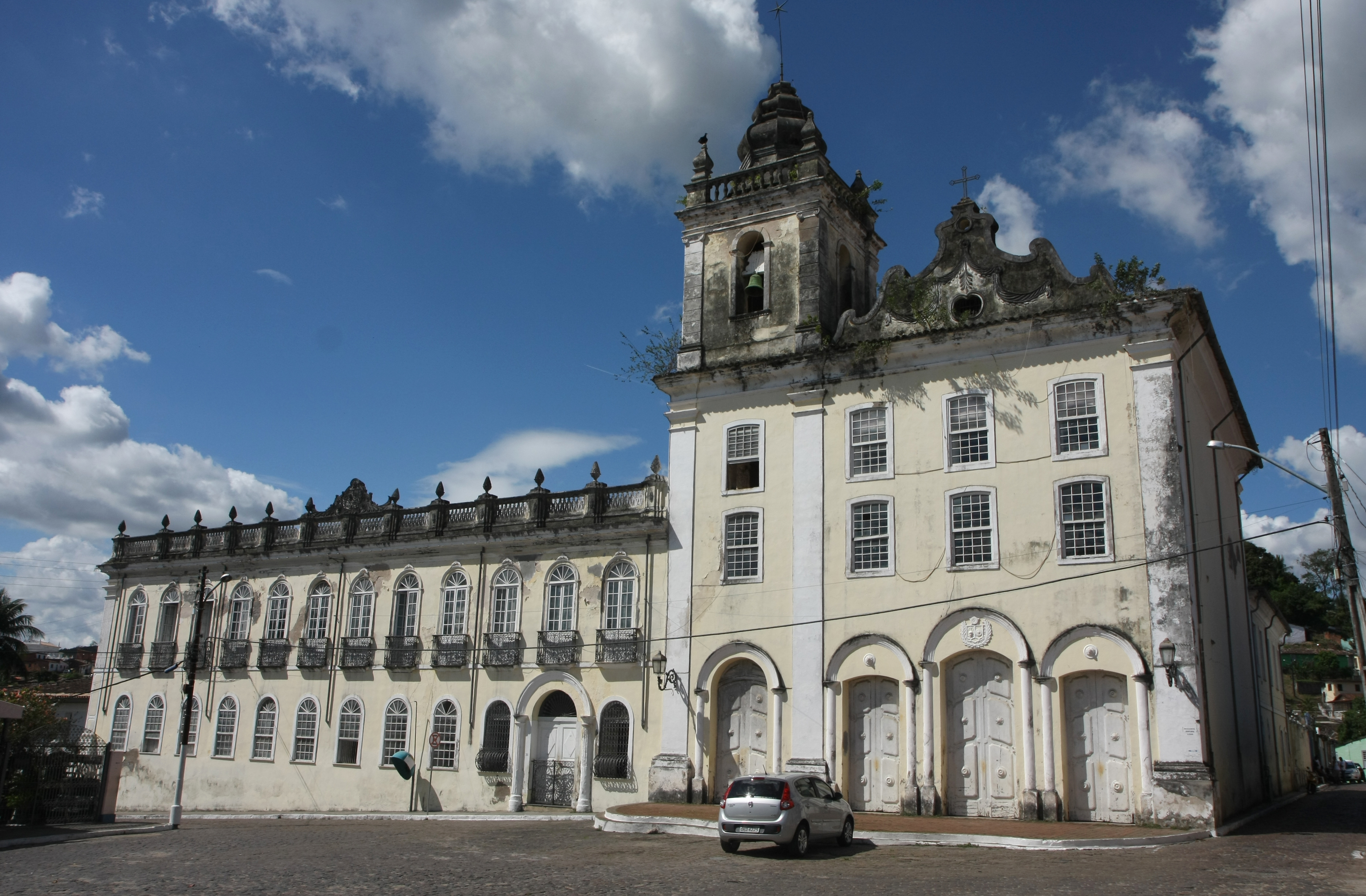
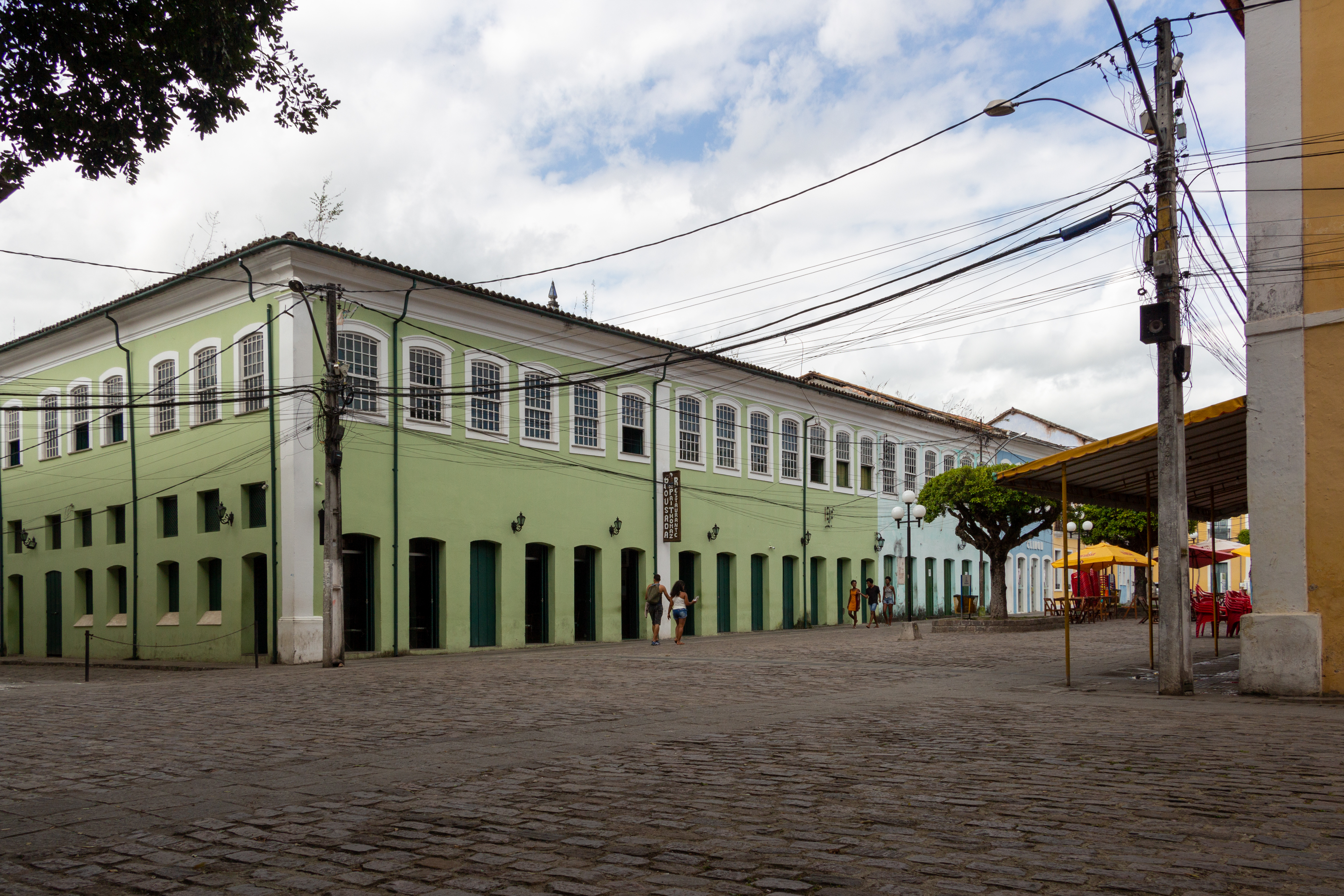
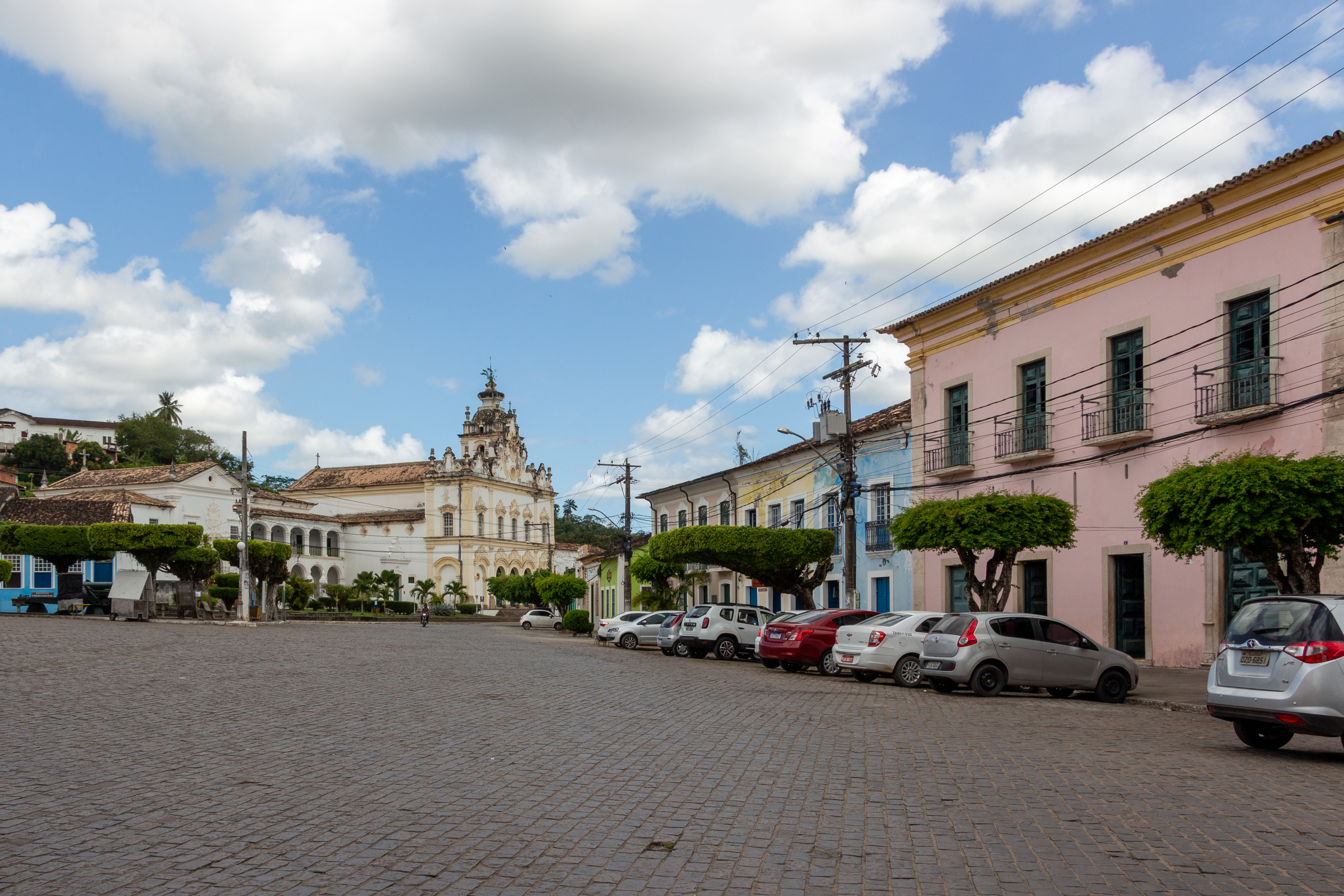
- Cachoeira on the Paraguaçu River

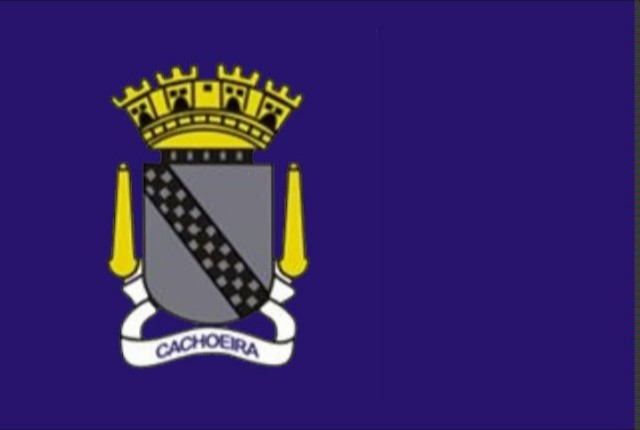
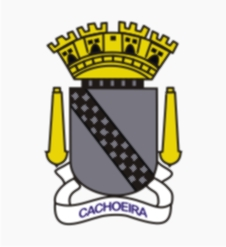
- Flag Coat of arms

- Location in Bahia
- Coordinates: 12°35′4″S 38°57′21″W
- Country: Brazil
- State: Bahia
- Meso-region: Metropolitana de Salvador
- Micro-Region: Santo Antônio de Jesus
- Founded: 1531
- Settled: 13 March 1837

Government
  - Mayor: Eliana Gonzaga de Jesus (Republicans)

Area
  - Total: 395.223 km^{2} (152.596 sq mi)

Population (2020)
  - Total: 33,567
  - Density: 84.932/km^{2} (219.97/sq mi)
- Demonym: Cachoeirano
- Time zone: UTC−3 (BRT)
- Postal code: 44300-xxx
- Area/distance code: (00)55
- HDI (2010): 0.647 – medium

National Historic Heritage of Brazil
- Designated: 1973
- Reference no.: 843

Cachoeira ([kaʃuˈe(j)ɾɐ], Portuguese, meaning waterfall) is an inland municipality of Bahia, Brazil, on the Paraguaçu River. The town exports sugar, cotton, and tobacco and is a thriving commercial and industrial centre.

The municipality contains 56% of the 10,074 hectares (24,890 acres) Baía do Iguape Marine Extractive Reserve, created in 2000.

São Félix is located directly across the Paraguaçu River from Cachoeira; it also borders the municipalities of Conceição da Feira, Santo Amaro, Saubara, Maragogipe, Governador Mangabeira, and Muritiba.

== History ==
The area of present-day Cachoeira was home to numerous Amerindians prior to the colonial period. Paulo Dias Adorno and Afonso Rodrigues arrived in the region in 1531 from Portugal. They and their descendants entered into a century of conflict with the existing indigenous population, ultimately resulting in the expulsion of native Brazilians from the region. Mem de Sá, governor-general of the Portuguese colony of Brazil from 1557 to 1572, first attempted to expel the native population from Cachoeira in 1559. Álvaro Rodrigues Adorno, son of António Dias Adorno, arrived in 1595 and attempted peace settlements with the Amerindian population. Fighting continued between the two groups into the 17th century and hindered the settlement of the region by the Portuguese. Captain-General Gaspar Rodrigues Adorno attempted a final expulsion of the indigenous population in the early 17th century, and his son, João Rodrigues Adorno, rebuilt the a residential fort and a chapel in 1654. The chapel, Capela de Nossa Senhora da Ajuda (Chapel of Our Lady of Help), became the first in Cachoeira.

The settlement became known as Nossa Senhora do Rosário in 1674. It became the second town in Bahia under a Royal Charter of 1693 and was renamed the Vila de Nossa Senhora do Rosário do Porto da Cachoeira do Porto da Cachoeira do Paraguaçu. Because of its location on the Paraguaçu River, the town served as an important economic link between the interior of Bahia and its capital, Salvador; the city connected the agricultural lands of the Recôncavo Baiano and the interior sertão region.

Sugar cane farming and gold mining on the De Contas River (Rio de Contas) brought wealth to Cachoeira and resulted in an organized settlement on the Paraguaçu with numerous public buildings, churches, and urban residences.

Cachoeira became a center of the independence movement in the early 19th century. It was a center of the war of the Independence of Bahia and was elevated to city status under an imperial decree of March 13, 1873. The Companhia Central da Bahia—Imperial Central Railway Company Limited constructed a 25 kilometres (16 mi) extension from Feira de Santana to Cachoeira and São Félix in 1874. A foundation stone of a future railroad bridge was placed in Cachoeira on December 22, 1881. The engineers Frederico Merei and Affonso Glycerio da Cunha Maciel built the bridge, which was inaugurated on July 7, 1885. Pedro II of Brazil allowed his name on the bridge, which was named the Dom Pedro II Bridge, and the Imperial Arms were placed on a keystone of the bridge.

The worldwide 1846–1860 cholera pandemic reduced the population of Cachoeira and caused widespread social and economic disorder. The disease spread to Salvador in early 1855 and appeared in the Caquende and Pitanga neighborhoods of Cachoeira in August. It soon spread to both urban and rural parts of the town; 100 people died within the first ten days of the arrival of cholera in the Cachoeira. The epidemic disproportionately affected the town's slave population. Ultimately 3,000 died from the disease in the urban part of the city and 8,500 in outlying rural areas. Entire families were lost to cholera, the town was left with numerous orphans, several engenhos closed, and the economy of Cachoeira saw a steadily decline.

The city is now a center of tourism, is noted for its historic structures, and is a center of Candomblé.

== Population history ==
Year	Population	Change	Density
1890	12,607	-	-
2004	31,071	-	77.98/km^{2}
2006	31,966	-	80.22/km^{2}
2010	32,026	-	81.03/km^{2}

== Notable people ==
- Ana Néri, Brazilian nurse, considered the first in her country, National Hero.
- Giva, football player
- Dionatan Machado, football player
- Mateus Aleluia, (Os Tincoãs) Singer
- Edson Gomes, Singer
- Mãe Beata de Iyemanjá, Candomblé priestess

== Historic structures ==
Cachoeira is home to numerous colonial-period historic structures, many designated as Brazilian national and Bahian state monuments. The historic center of Cachoeira was designated a national monument by the National Institute of Historic and Artistic Heritage (IPHAN). Cachoeira is also a noted center of historic terreiros of Candomblé, many of which have state or federal protection.

Churches

- Chapel of Our Lady of Help (Capela de Nossa Senhora da Ajuda)
- Church and Convent of Our Lady of Mount Carmel and House of Prayer of the Carmelite Third Order (Igreja e Convento de Nossa Senhora do Carmo e Capela e Casa de Oração da Ordem Terceira do Carmo)
- Church of the Old Seminary in Belém da Cachoeira (Igreja do Antigo Seminário de Belém de Cachoeira)
- Parish Church of Our Lady of the Rosary (Igreja Matriz de Nossa Senhora do Rosário)
- Parish Church of Santiago do Iguape (Igreja Matriz de Santiago, Iguape)
- Ruins of the Convent and Church of Saint Antony (Ruínas do Convento e Igreja de Santo António)

Candomblé Terreiros

- Terreiro Aganjú Didê da Nação Nagô-Tedô
- Terreiro Dendezeiros
- Terreiro Egbé Éran Ope Olúwa - Terreiro Viva Deus
- Terreiro Loba Nekun Filho
- Terreiro Ogodum Ei
- Terreiro Rumpayme Ayono Runtólogi
- Terreiro Zogbodo Male Bogun Seja Unde (Roça do Ventura)

Residences

- Ana Nery Birthplace (Casa Natal de Ana Nery)
- House at Praça Dr. Aristides Milton 23-A (Casa à Praça Dr. Aristides Milton 23-A)
- House at No. 4 Rua Ana Nery (Casa à Rua Ana Nery, 4)
- Sobrado at No. 1 Rua Ana Nery (Sobrado à Rua Ana Nery, 1)
- Sobrado at No. 2 Rua Ana Nery (Sobrado na Rua Ana Nery, 2)
- Sobrado at No. 25 Rua Ana Nery (Sobrado à Rua Ana Nery, 25)
- House at No. 1 Rua Benjamim Constant (Casa à Rua Benjamin Constant, 1)
- House at No. 2 Rua Benjamim Constant (Casa na Rua Benjamim Constant, 2)
- House at No. 17 Rua Benjamin Constant (Casa à Rua Benjamin Constant, 17)
- House at Rua Estrada de Ferro (Casa à Rua Estrada de Ferro)
- Teixeira de Freitas Birthplace (Casa natal de Teixeira de Freitas)
- Estrela Manor House (Solar Estrela)
- Sobrado at No. 4 Praça da Aclamação (Sobrado à Praça da Aclamação, 4)
- Sobrado at No. 13 Rua Treze de Maio (Sobrado à Rua Treze de Maio, 13)
- Sobrado of João R. Adorno (Sobrado de João R. Adorno)

Urban buildings and structures

- Praça Dr. Aristides Mílton Fountain (Chafariz da Praça Dr. Mílton)
- Garden of Hospital São João de Deus (Jardim do Hospital São João de Deus)
- Dom Pedro II Bridge (Ponte Dom Pedro II)
- Town Hall of Cachoeira (Casa de Câmara e Cadeia, Paço Municipal de Cachoeira)

Sugar plantations

- Campina Sugar Plantation (Engenho Campina)
- Da Ponta Sugar Plantation (Engenho da Ponta)
- Embiara Sugar Plantation (Engenho Embiara, Sobrado)
- Vitória Sugar Mill (Engenho Vitória)

== Gallery ==
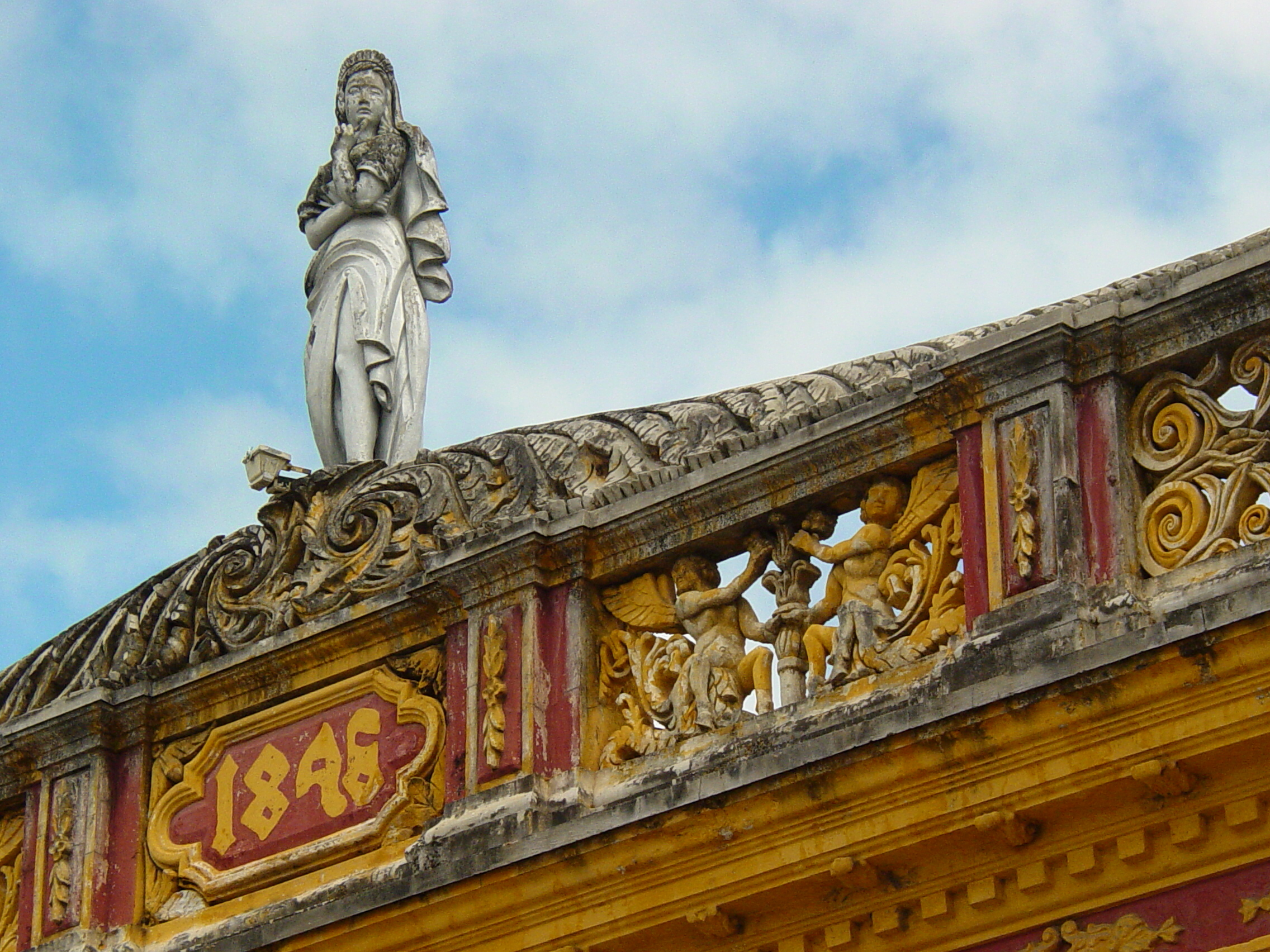
Nineteenth-Century Facade

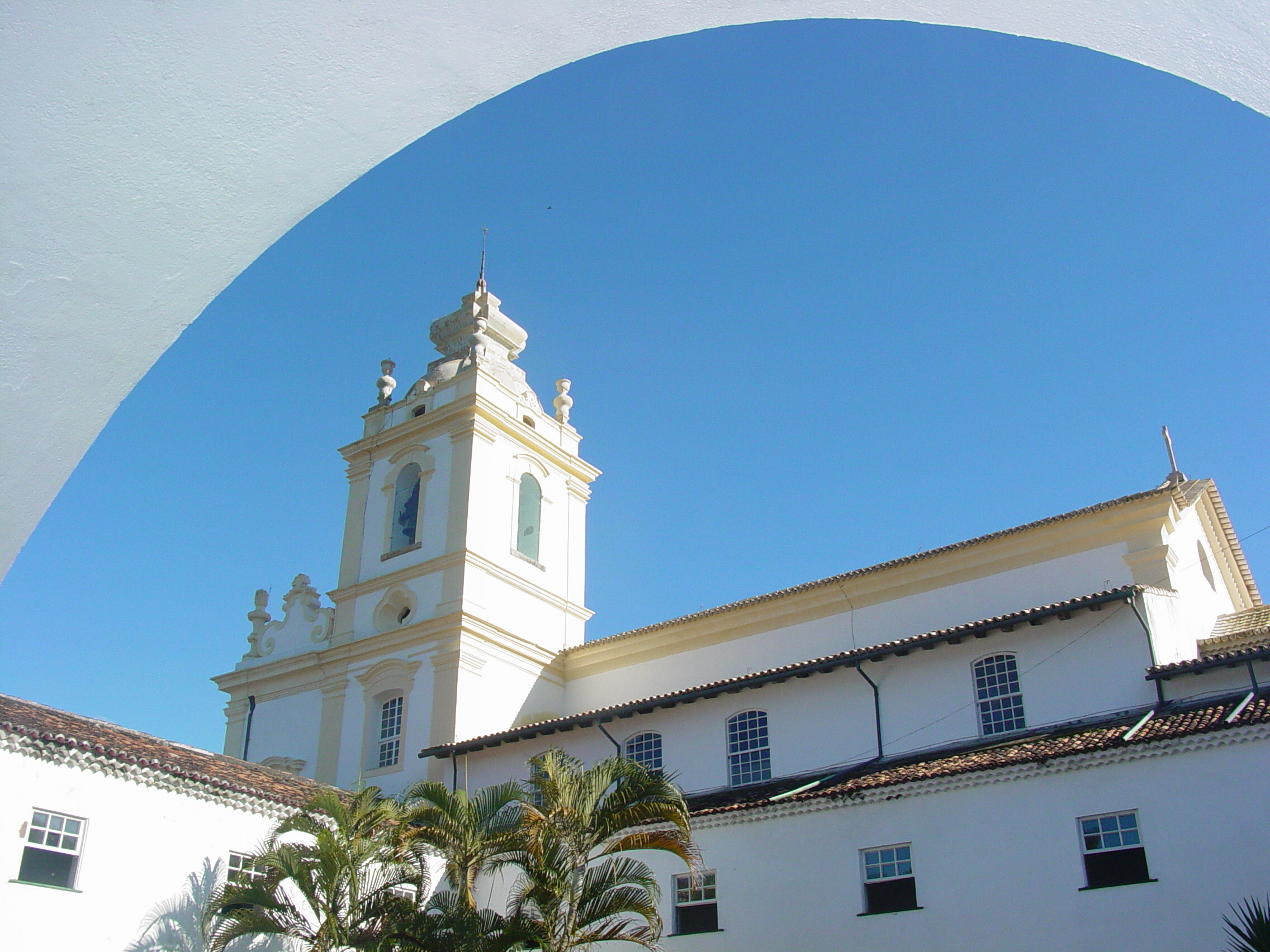
Church of the Third Order of Carmel

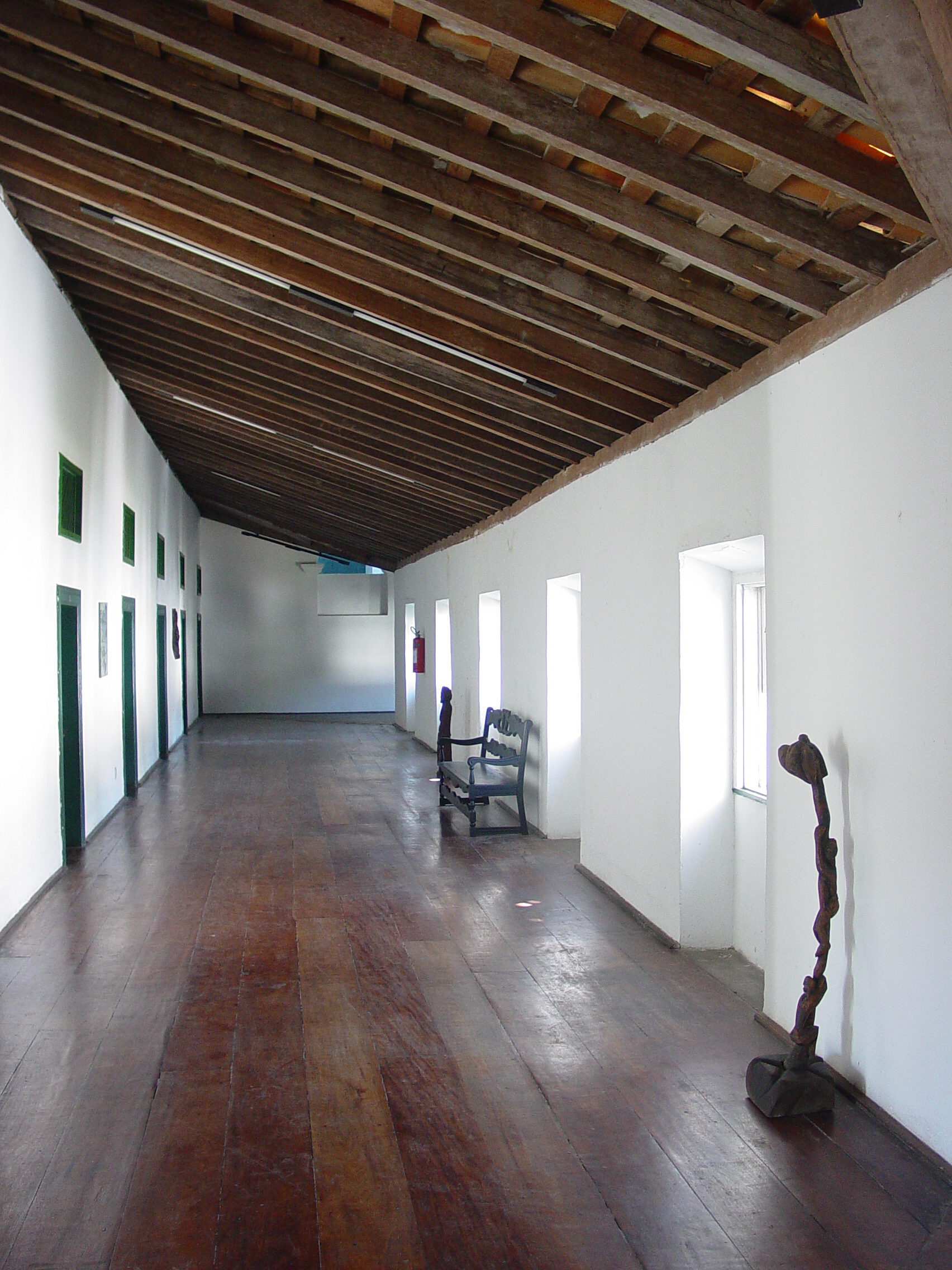
Carmel Inn

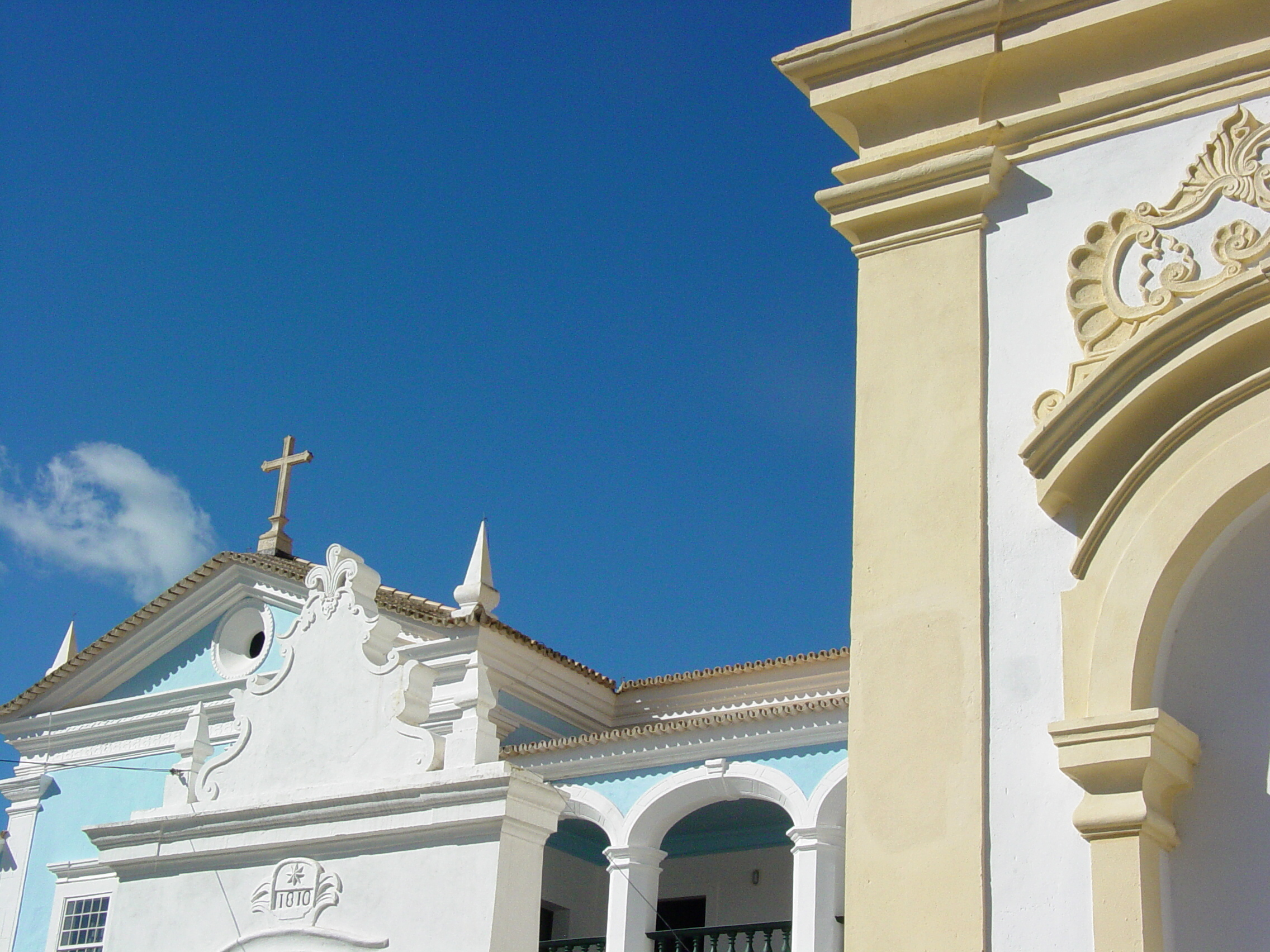
Building Facades
