= Dom Pedro II Bridge =

Bridge between Cachoeira and São Félix, Brazil

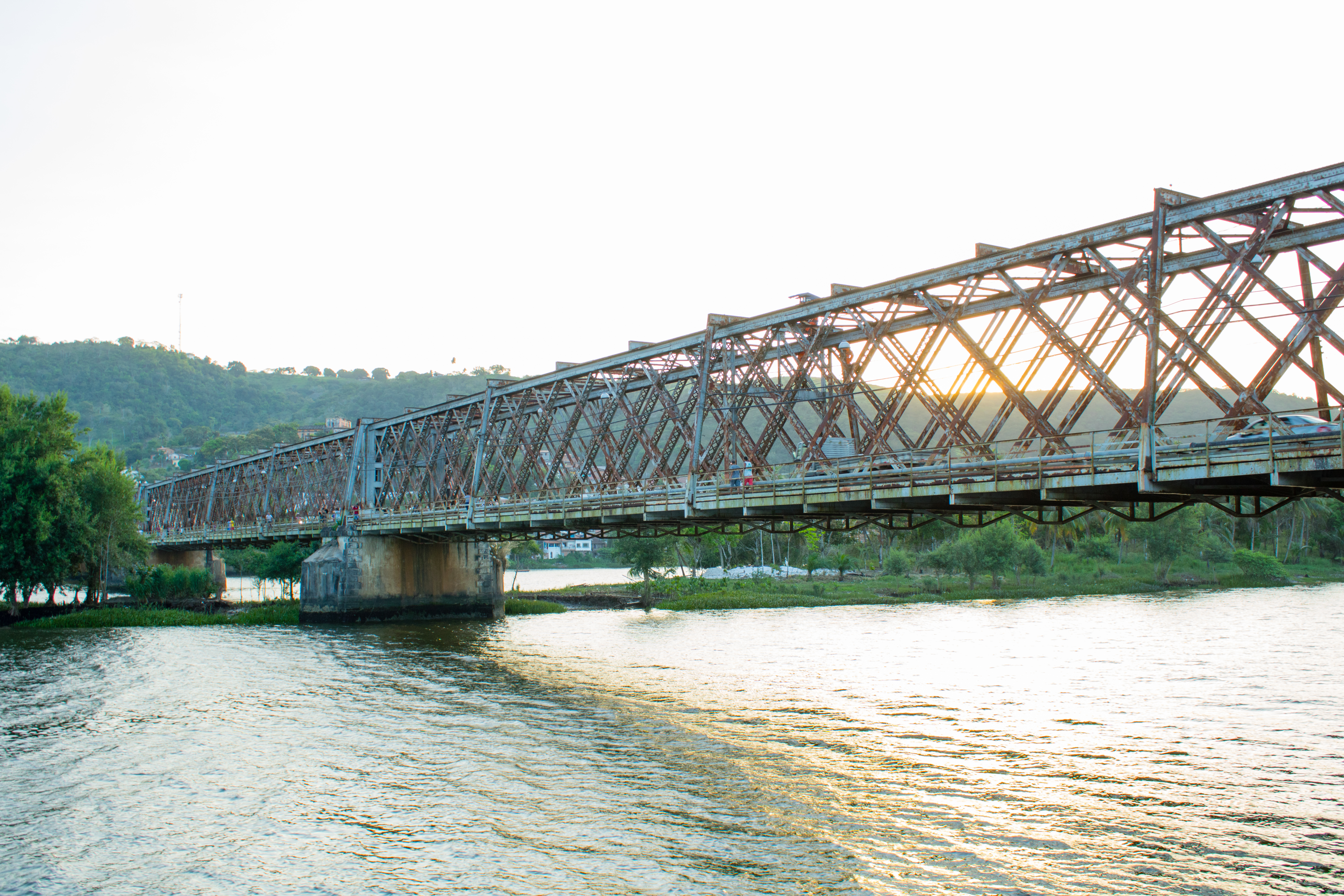
- Coordinates: 12.603941°S 38.968725°W
- Crosses: Paraguaçu River
- Locale: Cachoeira and São Félix, Brazil

Characteristics
- Total length: 9 metres (30 ft)
- Longest span: 365 metres (1,198 ft)

History
- Opened: July 7, 1885

Statistics
- Toll: Yes

Location
- Interactive map of Dom Pedro II Bridge

Dom Pedro II Bridge ((Portuguese: Ponte Dom Pedro II), also Dom Pedro II Imperial Bridge Portuguese: Ponte Dom Pedro II) is a bridge between Cachoeira and São Félix, Bahia, Brazil. It crosses the Paraguaçu River and serves as an automotive, rail, and pedestrian bridge. The bridge was inaugurated on July 7, 1885, was one of the main engineering works in South America at the time. It is composed of iron and wood ballast imported from England and measures 365.64 metres (1,199.6 ft) long and 9 metres (30 ft) wide with spans of 9.41 metres (30.9 ft).

Construction of the bridge opened rail traffic between Feira de Santana north of Salvador and the Chapada Diamantina in the interior of Bahia in the 19th century. The dual use of the bridge, however, for vehicle traffic and the Estrada de Ferro Central da Bahia (EFCBH) trunk line causes significant transportation bottlenecks in both Cachoeira and São Félix.

The central pillar of the bridge sits on a small island in the river. It is covered with vegetation and is considered a sacred space of the Candomblé religion.

== Access ==
The bridge is open to the public and may be visited.
