= Zoogodô Bogum Malê Rundó =

Candomblé temple in Salvador, Bahia, Brazil

- Location in Brazil

Religion
- Affiliation: Candomblé
- Sect: Jejé
- District: Engenho Velho da Federação
- Deity: Oxossi, Xango
- Leadership: Zaídes Iracema de Melo

Location
- Municipality: Salvador, Bahia
- Country: Brazil
- Interactive map of Zoogodô Bogum Malê Rundó
- Coordinates: 12.9985°S 38.4954°W

Architecture
- Established: 1835 or 1858

Zoogodô Bogum Malê Rundó, also known as the Terreiro do Bogum, is a Candomblé terreiro in Salvador, Bahia, Brazil. It is located high in the Engenho Velho da Federação, or simply Federação neighborhood of Salvador on Ladeira do Bogum, a narrow street, formerly known as Ladeira Manoel do Bonfim. It is an area long associated with residents of Kingdom of Dahomey descent. The terreiro covers 1,000 square metres (11,000 ft^{2}), of which 600 square metres (6,500 ft^{2}) is used for and includes religious structures and open spaces.

The terreiro is associated with the Jejé branch of the religion; it is both the first and last remaining Jejé terreiro in the region. It differs from other Candomblé terreiros of the Salvador region in its use of the Ewe language of present-day Benin, in contrast to the widespread use of Yoruba in other temples. The temple uses the term vodun for its deities in place of the more common orixás; it is one of its numerous similarities to Haitian Vodou. The Bogum community closely related to Jejé temples in Cachoeira, a small city in the Recôncavo Baiano in the interior of Bahia. The Zoogodô Bogum Malê Seja Undé (Roça do Ventura) terreiro in Cachoeira shares a lineage with Zoogodô Bogum Malê Rundó.

== Location ==
Zoogodô Bogum Malê Rundó is located in Engenho Velho da Federação on Ladeira do Bogum. It is located southeast close to Terreiro Ilê Aché Ibá Ogum; and further southeast Terreiro de Candomblé Ilê Axé Oxumaré, better known as Terreiro Casa Branca.

== History ==
Zoogodô Bogum Malê Rundó was founded either in 1835 or 1858 and formally incorporated in 1937 as the Sociedade Beneficente Fieis de Sao Bartolomeu. The location of the terreiro is where Joaquim Jêje, a hero of the Malê revolt of 1835, left a bogum, or chest where the donations could support the movement. The term bogum is a combination of the words igbo ("lugar") and gun ("Fon"). The term originates from the Gun dialect of the Porto Novo, Benin, a dialect of the Fon language that utilizes many elements of Yoruba. The terreiro was led by Africans until the death of Mãe de Santo Valentina (Maria Valentina dos Anjos Costa) in 1975; she remained fluent in the Fon language throughout her life.

=== Relationship to Zoogodô Bogum Malê Seja Undé ===
Zoogodô Bogum Malê Rundó shares a common history with Zoogodô Bogum Malê Seja Undé, also known as the Roça do Ventura, a terreiro in Cachoeira. The relationship and lineage of the two terreiros remains unclear.

=== Current status ===
The land area of the terreiro has changed significantly over time. It has lost major parts of its green areas due to a lack of urban planning in Salvador. The Bogum community is now unable to collect plants required for worship in the terreiro, and the reduction of green spaces also reduces the privacy of Bogum community. This is a problem common to Afro-Brazilian religious centers in Salvador.

As of 2008, Zoogodô Bogum Malê Rundó has approximately 150 members and is actively adding new members. It receives visitors for its festival days; they occur from January first and continue to mid-April.

== Lineage ==
- Ludovina Pessoa - founder of the Jejé sect of Candomblé
  - Mãe Romana de Possú - Gaiaku Romaninha, an initiate of Maria Ogorensi
  - Luiza Franquelina da Rocha - Gaiaku Luiza - an initiate of Mãe Romaninha
- Maria Emiliana Piedade dos Reis - 1935-1950
- Mãe Runhó, Valentina Maria dos Anjos Costa, 1960-1975
- Mãe Nicinha, Gamo Lokossi - Evangelista dos Anjos Costa, 1978-1994
- Mãe Índia, Zaildes Iracema de Mello, 2003–present

== Protected status ==
Zoogodô Bogum Malê Rundó, despite its long history in Salvador, lacks municipal, state, or federal protection. The process of its declaration as a state monument by the Artistic and Cultural Institute of Bahia (IPAC) began in 2022. It remains vulnerable to land speculation due to the dense development of Engenho Velho da Federação. In contrast, Zoogodô Bogum Malê Seja Undé in Cachoeira, the Terreiro of Roca do Ventura, is protected by the Brazilian National Institute of Historic and Artistic Heritage (IPHAN).
