= Terreiro Loba Nekun Filho =

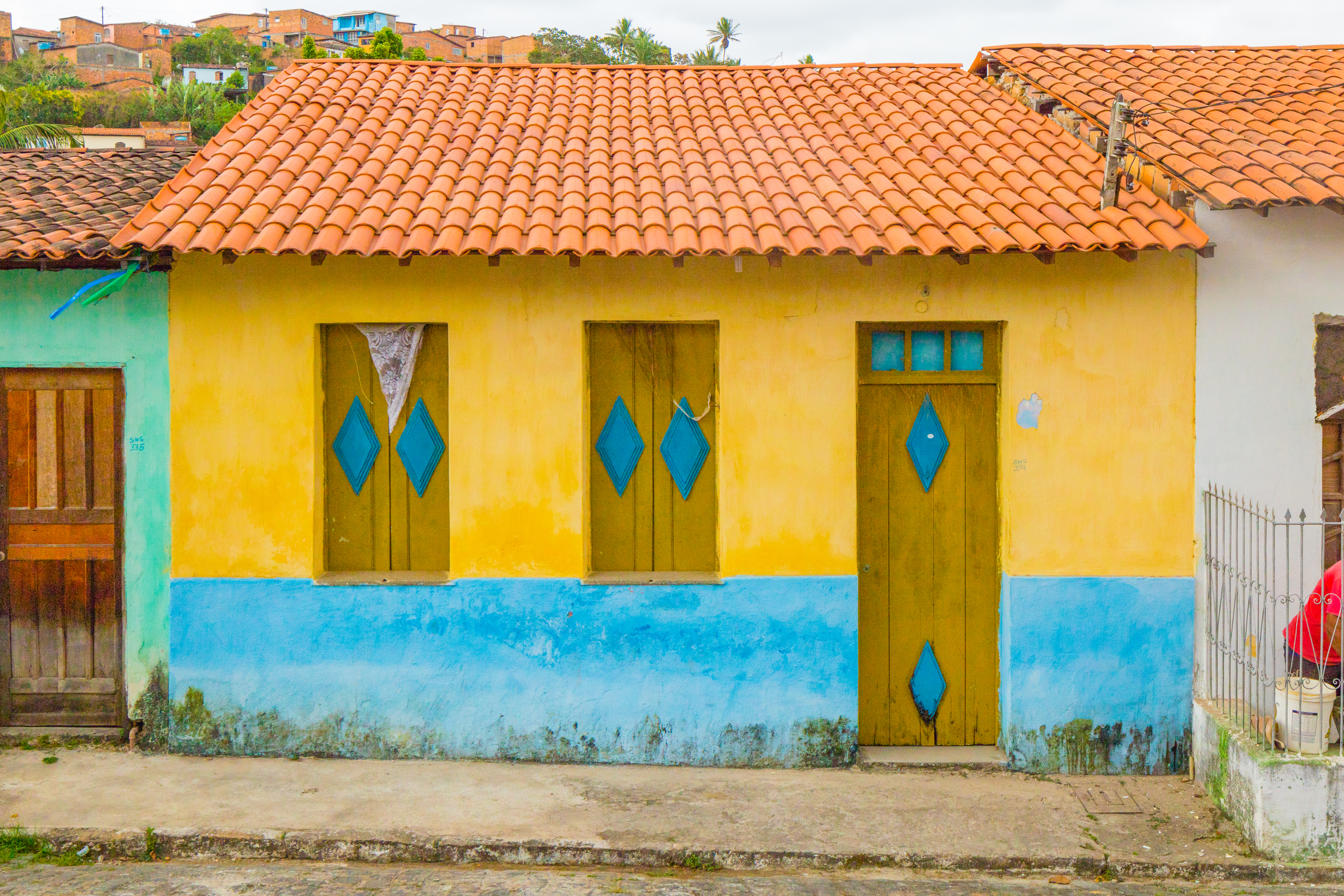
- Terreiro Loba Nekun Filho, Cachoeira, Bahia, Brazil

- Location of Terreiro Loba Nekun Filho in Brazil

Religion
- Affiliation: Candomblé
- Sect: Candomblé
- Year consecrated: 1930

Location
- Municipality: Cachoeira
- State: Bahia
- Country: Brazil
- Interactive map of Terreiro Loba Nekun Filho
- Coordinates: 12.6011°S 38.9689°W

Architecture
- Founder: Mãe Lira de Iemanjá Ogunté

Terreiro Loba Nekun Filho, also spelled as Terreiro Lobanekum Filho, or Casa de Mae Lira, is a Candomblé terreiro in Cachoeira, Bahia, Brazil. It was founded by Amazilia Matias da Conceição (1906-1997), better known as Mãe Lira de Iemanjá Ogunté. Unlike other terreiros that cover large urban or rural spaces, Terreiro Loba Nekun Filho is located in a long, narrow single-story row house. The terreiro is protected as a historic structure by the state of Bahia.

== History ==
Terreiro Loba Nekun Filho was founded in 1930 by Amazilia Matias da Conceição (1906-1997), better known as Mãe Lira de Iemanjá Ogunté. Mãe Lira was an initiate of Terreiro Loba'Nekun, a Candomblé terreiro in Terra Vermelha, a rural area north of the town of Cachoeira. She was dedicated to the orisha, or deity, Iemanjá. Mãe Lira was 17 at the time of her initiation, and left Terreiro Loba'Nekun in 1925 to found an independent terreiro, called Terreiro Loba Nekun Filho, filho meaning "son" in Portuguese. Mãe Lira and members of the terreiros are of nagô origin, or descendants of enslaved people from Yoruba-speaking people of present-day Nigeria and Benin.

Leadership of the terreiro was passed to Zuleide da Paixão Lima, better known as Mãe Ledinha de Oyá, after the death of Mãe Lira. Mãe Ledinha is the niece of the founder. The terreiro expanded after the death of Mãe Lira to occupy an adjacent, narrow house.

== Location ==
Terreiro Loba Nekun Filho is located on a street that descends from the rear of the Church of Nossa Senhora do Monte, constructed in 1795. Unlike other Candomblé terreiros in Cachoeira, it is located within the urban center of Cachoeira. The terreiro is in a long row of connected, single-story houses.

== Grounds and structures ==
Terreiro Loba Nekun Filho is located in a long, narrow, single-story house. The rear of the terreiro opens to a small yard.

== Festivals ==
Terreiro Loba Nekun Filho holds public festivals in June, August, and December. The June 1st festival coincides with a public commemoration honoring the Independence of Bahia. They include a water offering to the orixa Iemanjá, as well as celebrations in honor of Obaluaê, Ogum, Oxossi, Xangô, and Caboclo Juremeira, a Brazilian Amerindian folk deity.

- June: Iemanjá, Ogun, Oxossi, Xangô
- August: Nanã and Obaluaê
- December: Caboclo Juremeira.

== Heritage status ==
Terreiro Loba Nekun Filho is a protected structure by the Bahian Institute of Artistic Culture and Heritage (Instituto do Patrimônio Artístico e Cultural da Bahia) under Decree no. 15.681 of 2014.
