= Church and Convent of Our Lady of Mount Carmel (Cachoeira) =

Roman Catholic church in Bahia, Brazil

- Igreja e Convento de Nossa Senhora do Carmo
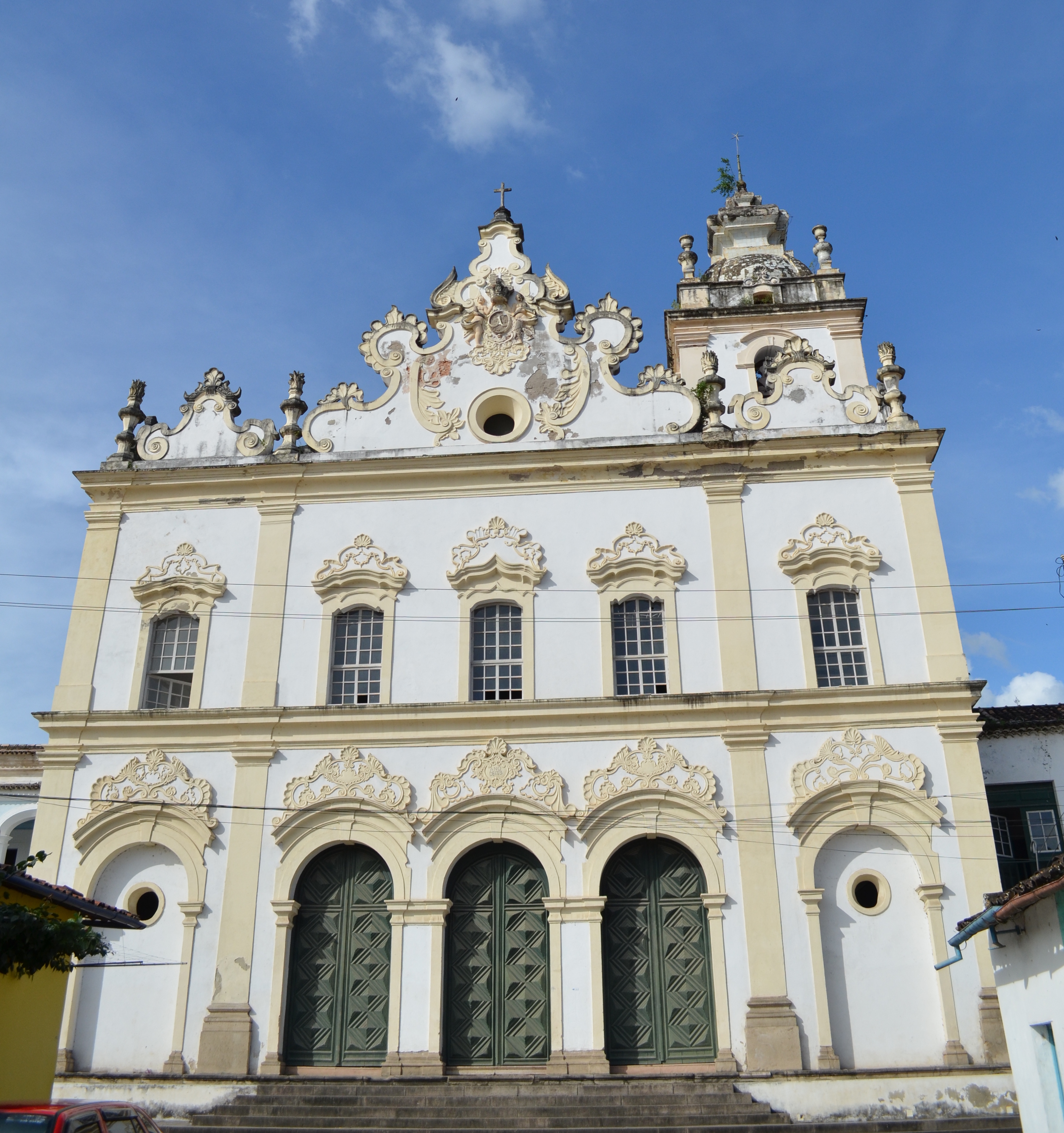
- Façade of the Church and Convent of Our Lady of Mount Carmel

- Location of the Church and Convent of Our Lady of Mount Carmel in Brazil

Religion
- Affiliation: Catholic
- Rite: Roman

Location
- Municipality: Cachoeira
- State: Bahia
- Country: Brazil
- Interactive map of Church and Convent of Our Lady of Mount Carmel
- Coordinates: 12.606350°S 38.961586°W

Architecture
- Type: Religious
- Style: Baroque
- Founder: João Rodrigues Adorno
- Groundbreaking: 1688
- Completed: 1733

National Historic Heritage of Brazil
- Designated: 1938
- Reference no.: 181

The Church and Convent of Our Lady of Mount Carmel (Portuguese: Igreja e Convento de Nossa Senhora do Carmo) is an 18th-century Roman Catholic church in Cachoeira, Bahia, Brazil. It was constructed between 1688 and likely completed in 1773. The church is dedicated to Our Lady of the Rosary and is constructed in the Baroque style with a Rococo frontispiece. The church opens to Travessa Taváres, a broad avenue, with a view to the Paraguaçu River. The church is dedicated to Our Lady of Mount Carmel.

The church and convent are connected to the House of Prayer of the Carmelite Third Order; the two form a single architectural complex. The church and convent, as well as the Carmelite Third Order church, was listed as a historic structure by National Institute of Historic and Artistic Heritage (IPHAN) in 1938. The convent was converted to a guest house in the 20th century and is known as the Pousada Convento do Carmo.

== History ==
The Carmelites arrived in Brazil in 1586, following the Jesuits and Benedictines. The expansion of the order in Brazil was limited by the invasion of the Dutch in Brazil, 1630–1654. Friar Manoel da Assunção, the Carmelite provincial vicar of Bahia and Pernambuco, sent emissaries to the interior of Bahia in the late 1680s as part of an expansion of the order in Brazil. Construction of the Church and Convent of Our Lady of Mount Carmel began in 1688. João Rodrigues Adorno, son of Gaspar Rodrigues Adorno, the founder of Cachoeira, donated land to the Carmelites "at the foot of the slope behind the houses of Francisco Lopes". Work on a retreat was completed in 1692. In addition to the Carmelite structure, João Rodrigues Adorno donated land to the Society of Jesus to construct the Church of the Old Seminary in Belém da Cachoeira in the same period, 7 kilometres (4.3 mi) north of Carmelite church and convent.

The site of the Mount Carmel church and convent was part of a sugar cane mill owned by Adorno. Brother Manoel da Piedade founded the convent, which was constructed between 1715 and 1722. 15 friars and 12 brothers occupied the building by 1743; the low occupancy of the buildings in this period indicates the building was not fully functioning. The church was constructed between 1752 and 1759 under Father Antônio de Belém Lemos. The date on the frontispiece of the church, 1773, refers to a restoration of the church to add a gallery between the wall of the frontispiece and the door of the nave and the installation of an organ. The convent was renovated to house the battalion of a militia, which it housed between 1817 and 1823. It was again adapted to function as a mint between 1822 and 1823. The mint operated for only a month. It was also used as a school, town hall, courtroom, and hospital in the 19th century; by the end of this period the rich art collection and most of the interior elements of the church and convent were lost. The convent became a guest house in the 20th century.

== Location ==
The Church and Convent of Our Lady of Mount Carmel is located on Rua Inocêncio Boaventura at the Praça da Aclamação, a plaza, in the Caquende neighborhood of Cachoeira. The church and convent are connected to the House of Prayer of the Carmelite Third Order to form an architectural complex called "the most important urban space" by IPAC. A small hill above the convent, which now houses a children's hospital, is known as Morro Mangabeira. The hill frames the architectural complex in vegetation. The sugar mill of João Rodrigues Adorno was located on the flank of the hill.

== Structure ==
The Church and Convent of Our Lady of Mount Carmel is a two-story structure with a raised frontispiece. It consists of a church to its left (north) side and a convent to its right (south) side. Its walls are of mixed masonry.

=== Church ===
The frontispiece is in the rococo style and advances onto the street. It has a wide covered gallery with five semi-circular arches, three of them occupied by wooden doors. Five choir windows are above the portals. In contrast, the façades of the convent and the Church of the Third Order are, in comparison, sober. The pinnacle of the façade is in three parts with five semi-circular arches. The flaming rococo pediments, according to the art historian Germain Bazin, display elements of Chinese architecture, probably via the influence of architecture in the Portuguese colony of Macau. A bell tower rises above the right side of the church; it is recessed from the façade. The design of the church is similar to that of the convents of Carmo, Graça and Desterro, in Salvador, all constructed in the same period.

The church plan is typical to others of the period; it has a rectangular plan with a single nave with two side aisles superposed by tribunes and a cross sacristy. Its side corridors are superposed by tribunes and deep chapel. The church interior was richly decorated, but very little remains of its original decoration. The high altar has four Solominic columns with intricate carvings. Figurative tiles remain in one of the lateral chapels. Its main image was moved to the museum in the Church of the Third Order. The church ceiling features trompe-l'œil paintings from the school of Antonio Simões Ribeiro and José Joaquim da Rocha. The sacristy has decoration in the rococo style. It has a small altar with carving work, two chests of drawers, and a lavabo of Lias stone imported from Portugal.

=== Convent ===
The convent consists of a central cloister surrounded by semi-circular arcades of brick. Access to the convent is from the south. Stone Tuscan columns support the porch of the convent.

The convent has nine wings, two halls, a refectory, kitchen, catacombs, and smaller miscellaneous rooms. A coat of arms of the order in stucco is the sole remaining interior element from the original convent; it is located on the door of the cloister that gives access to the stair of the building. The porch door that opens to the street is the sole remaining exterior element of the convent. A chapel in the catacombs of the convent has mud carvings.

== Protected status ==
The Church and Convent of Our Lady of Mount Carmel and House of Prayer of the Carmelite Third Order were listed as a historic structure by the National Institute of Historic and Artistic Heritage in 1938. It was listed in the Book of Historical Works no. 181.

== See also ==
- Catholic Church in Brazil
