= Parish Church of Santiago do Iguape =

Roman Catholic church in Bahia, Brazil

- Igreja Matriz de Santiago do Iguape
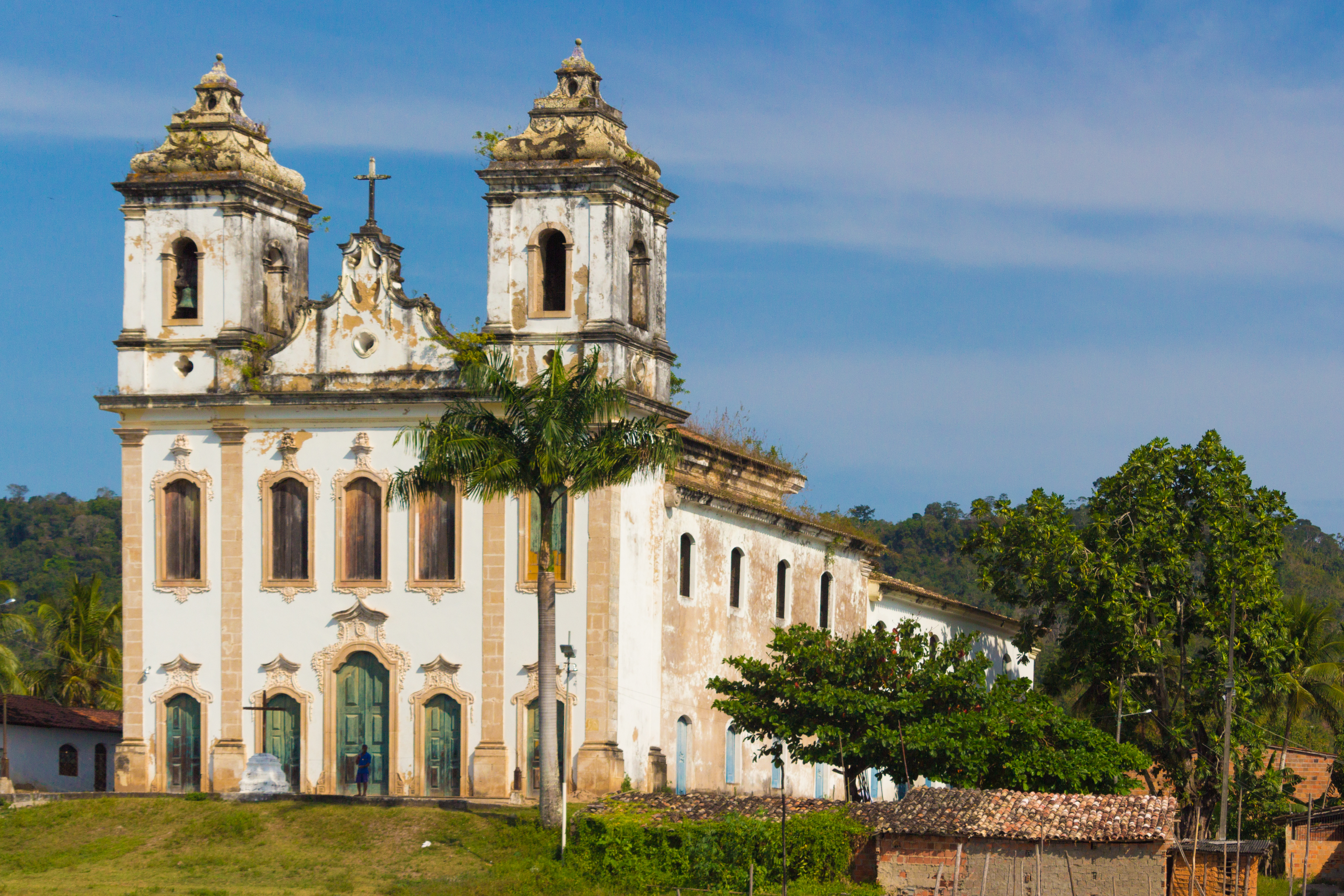
- Parish Church of Santiago do Iguape, Cachoeira

- Location of the Parish Church of Santiago do Iguape in Brazil

Religion
- Affiliation: Catholic
- Rite: Roman

Location
- Municipality: Cachoeira
- State: Bahia
- Country: Brazil
- Interactive map of Parish Church of Santiago do Iguape
- Coordinates: 12.684464°S 38.860069°W

Architecture
- Style: Baroque
- Completed: 1754

National Historic Heritage of Brazil
- Designated: 1960
- Reference no.: 575

The Parish Church of Santiago do Iguape (Portuguese: Igreja Matriz de Santiago do Iguape) is a Roman Catholic church in the Iguape district of Cachoeira, Bahia, Brazil. Its construction began in the 16th century by the Jesuits, but the original complex fell into ruins and was replaced by the current structure, which dates from the 19th century. The church was listed as a historic structure by National Institute of Historic and Artistic Heritage (IPHAN) in 1960.

== History ==
The Jesuits founded the Parish of Santiago do Iguape in the 16th century, making it the oldest in Paraguaçu. The primitive chapel was built on the lands of Antonio Lopes Ulhoa, who was a Knight of the Order of Santiago de Compostela and also owner of the San Domingos da Ponta Mill. In 1608 it received the canonical sanction of Matriz de Santiago.

In 1783, the original church complex deteriorated with the expulsion of the Jesuit priests from Brazil and was replaced by the current structure, whose construction began in the first half of the 19th century and was postponed until the end of the 19th century without ever being completed. The site is known as the district of Cachoeira do Iguape.

== Location ==
The Parish Church of Santiago do Iguape is located on the Iguape inlet, sometimes called a lake, of the Paraguaçu River. The facade of the church and its entrance faces the river. The rear of the church faces the community of Iguape and lacks an entrance. Every year it is visited by the Knights of Santiago de Compostela.

== Structure ==
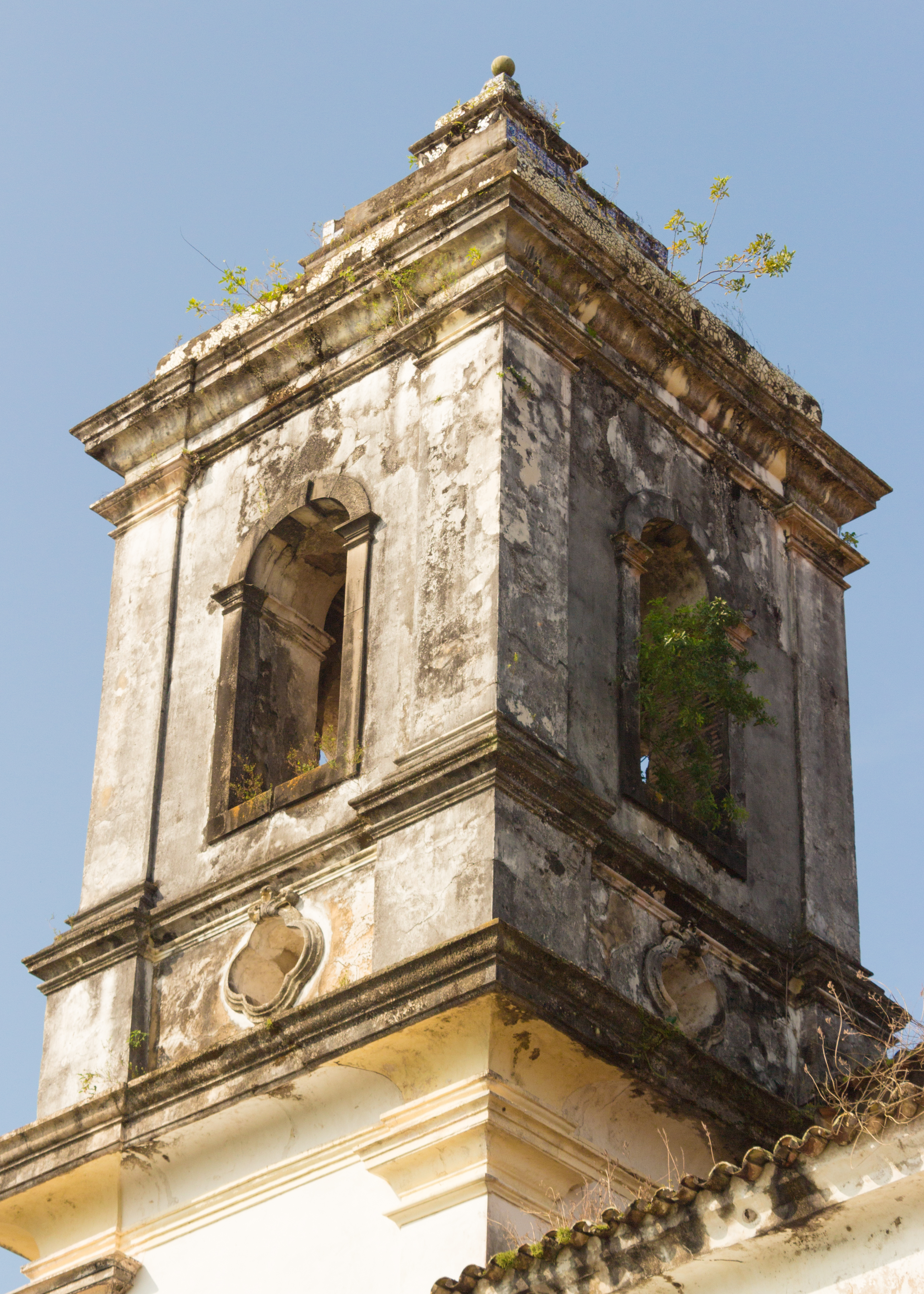
The church's bell tower.

The Parish Church of Santiago do Iguape was constructed of mixed masonry of stone and brick. Its frontispiece is "extremely elegant" and is in the rococo Dona Maria I style. It is divided by sandstone pilasters, five portals superimposed by five windows at the choir level. The portals and windows are framed in lioz stone imported from Portugal; they have elaborate garland decoration borders. The facade is surmounted by an ornate baroque-style pediment. The church has two bell towers with gables at each side of the pediment. The bell gables have bulbous towers covered in glazed china fragments and azulejos, a feature found in numerous churches in Salvador and Recôncavo region.

The east, west, and rear facades of the church were never completed and lack any ornamentation.

=== Interior ===
The interior of the church has a rectangular plan with a single nave. It has two side aisles superposed by tribunes and a transversal sacristy; these are features common to churches of the period.

The interior has few decorative features and is considered unfinished. The chancel arch, balconies of the tribunes, and presbytery have simple ashlar facings; a lavabo is located in the sacristy. The chancel has semi-industrial tiles imported from Portugal in blue and white.

== Protected status ==
The Parish Church of Santiago do Iguape was listed as a historic structure by the National Institute of Historic and Artistic Heritage in 1960. It was listed in the Book of Historical Works no. 575.
