= Baía do Iguape Marine Extractive Reserve =

Protected area in Brazil

- Reserva Extrativista Marinha da Baía do Iguape
- IUCN category VI (protected area with sustainable use of natural resources)
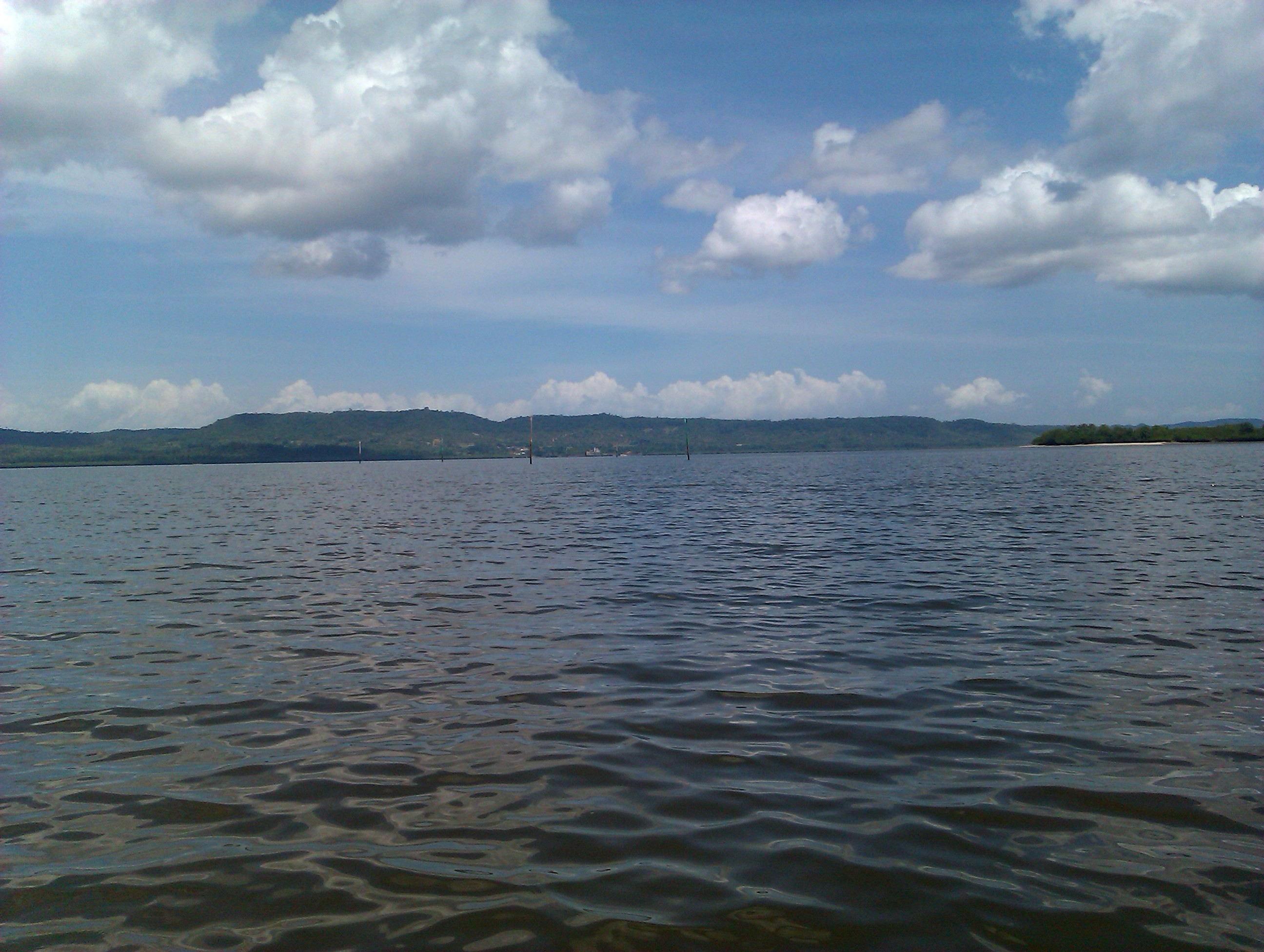
- The bay in November 2011

- Location within Brazil
- Nearest city: Salvador, Bahia
- Coordinates: 12.748093°S 38.888863°W
- Area: 10,074 hectares (24,890 acres)
- Designation: Extractive reserve
- Created: 11 August 2000
- Administrator: Chico Mendes Institute for Biodiversity Conservation

The Baía do Iguape Marine Extractive Reserve (Portuguese: Reserva Extrativista Marinha da Baía do Iguape) is a marine extractive reserve in the state of Bahia, Brazil. As of 2002 the reserve supported about 5,000 people engaged in fishing and shellfish collection.

== Location ==
The Baía do Iguape Marine Extractive Reserve is divided between the municipalities of Cachoeira (56.37%) and Maragogipe (39.48%) in the state of Bahia. It covers 10,074 hectares (24,890 acres). (Note: The Instituto Socioambiental gives the area as 10,074 hectares (24,890 acres). The Chico Mendes Institute for Biodiversity Conservation, which administers the reserve, gives an area of 10,082.45 hectares (24,914.3 acres).) It covers the long and narrow Iguape Bay at the mouth of the Paraguaçu River which empties into the Bay of All Saints (Baia de Todos os Santos).

== Economy ==
As of 2002 there were about 900 families with 4,960 people involved in fishing and gathering shellfish in the bay. Fishing is mainly done by men and shellfish collection by women and children. Shrimps, fish, oysters and mussels are harvested, sorted, in some cases smoked, and sold to middlemen who take the product to Salvador. Other economic activities include agriculture, crafts, and more recently fish farming. Earnings are generally well above the minimum wage. As of 1998 only 4% of the population had high school education and 28% were illiterate.

As of 2009 the state government had selected the extreme south of the reserve as the site for a naval centre, and was proceeding with implementation. The local communities had not been consulted. The project was justified on the basis of creating jobs, but negative social impacts had not been considered.

== History ==
The Baía do Iguape Marine Extractive Reserve was created by presidential decree on 11 August 2000. When created it had an area of about 8,117.53 hectares (20,058.9 acres) of which 2,831.24 hectares (6,996.1 acres) were land and mangroves, and 5,286.29 hectares (13,062.7 acres) were inland waters. It became part of the Central Atlantic Forest Ecological Corridor, created in 2002. It is classed as IUCN protected area category VI (protected area with sustainable use of natural resources). The objective is to protect an area used by traditional extractive populations whose livelihood is based on extraction, subsistence agriculture and raising small animals, to protect the livelihoods and culture of these populations, and to ensure sustainable use of natural resources.

Law 12058 of 13 October 2009 amended the limits, defining an area of about 10,074.42 hectares (24,894.4 acres) with a perimeter of about 163,510.22 metres (536,450.9 ft). The deliberative council was created by ICMBio on 16 October 2009 with representatives of government agencies and the extractive communities. The reserve was recognised on 14 May 2014 for PRONAF purpose as covering 1,500 extractive families.

== Sources ==
- Catherine Prost (2009), Resex Marinha versus Pólo Naval na Baía do Iguape (PDF) (in Portuguese), Universidade Federal da Bahia, archived from the original (PDF) on 2015-06-17
- Lamas, Ivana Reis; Crepaldi, Maria Otávia; Mesquita, Carlos Alberto Bernardo (2015), Uma Rede no Corredor (PDF) (in Portuguese), Conservação Internacional (CI-Brasil), ISBN 978-85-98830-28-5
- Resex Baia de Iguape (in Portuguese), Chico Mendes Institute for Biodiversity Conservation
- RESEX Marinha da Baía do Iguape (in Portuguese), ISA: Instituto Socioambiental
- Unidade de Conservação: Reserva Extrativista Marinha da Baía do Iguapé (in Portuguese), MMA: Ministério do Meio Ambiente
