= Conceição da Feira =

Municipality of Bahia State, Brazil

- Municipality
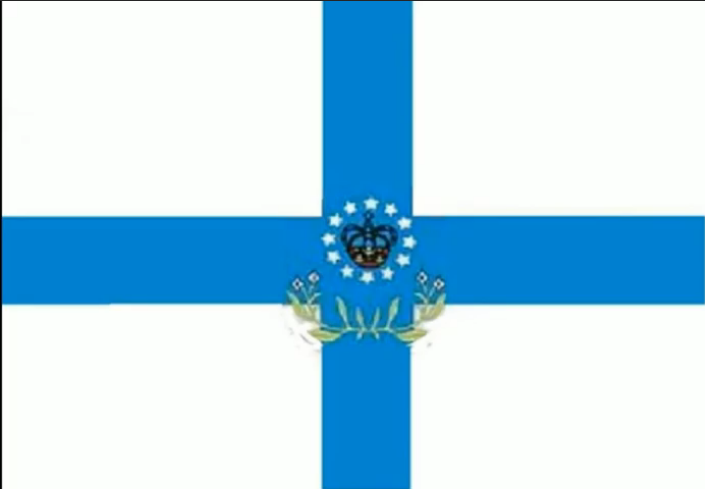
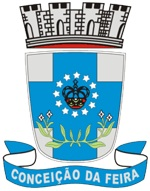
- Flag Coat of arms

- Location in Bahia
- Coordinates: 12°30′21″S 38°59′56″W
- Country: Brazil
- State: Bahia
- Meso-region: Centro Norte Baiano
- Micro-Region: Feira de Santana
- Established: July 23, 1946

Government
  - Mayor: Raimundo da Cruz Bastos

Area
  - Total: 164.8 km^{2} (63.6 sq mi)
- Elevation: 218 m (715 ft)

Population 2020 (est.)
  - Total: 22,762
  - Density: 138.1/km^{2} (357.7/sq mi)
- Demonym: Conceiçoense
- Time zone: UTC−3 (BRT)
- Area/distance code: (00)55
- Website: conceicaodafeira.ba.gov.br

Conceição da Feira is a municipality in the state of Bahia in the North-East region of Brazil.

== Neighborhoods ==
- Centro
- Santa Luzia (Baixinha)
- Pinheiro
- Recanto do Paraguaçu
- Rocinha
- Conceição Velha
