= House at No. 4 Rua Ana Nery =

House in Cachoeira, Bahia

- Casa à Rua Ana Nery, 4
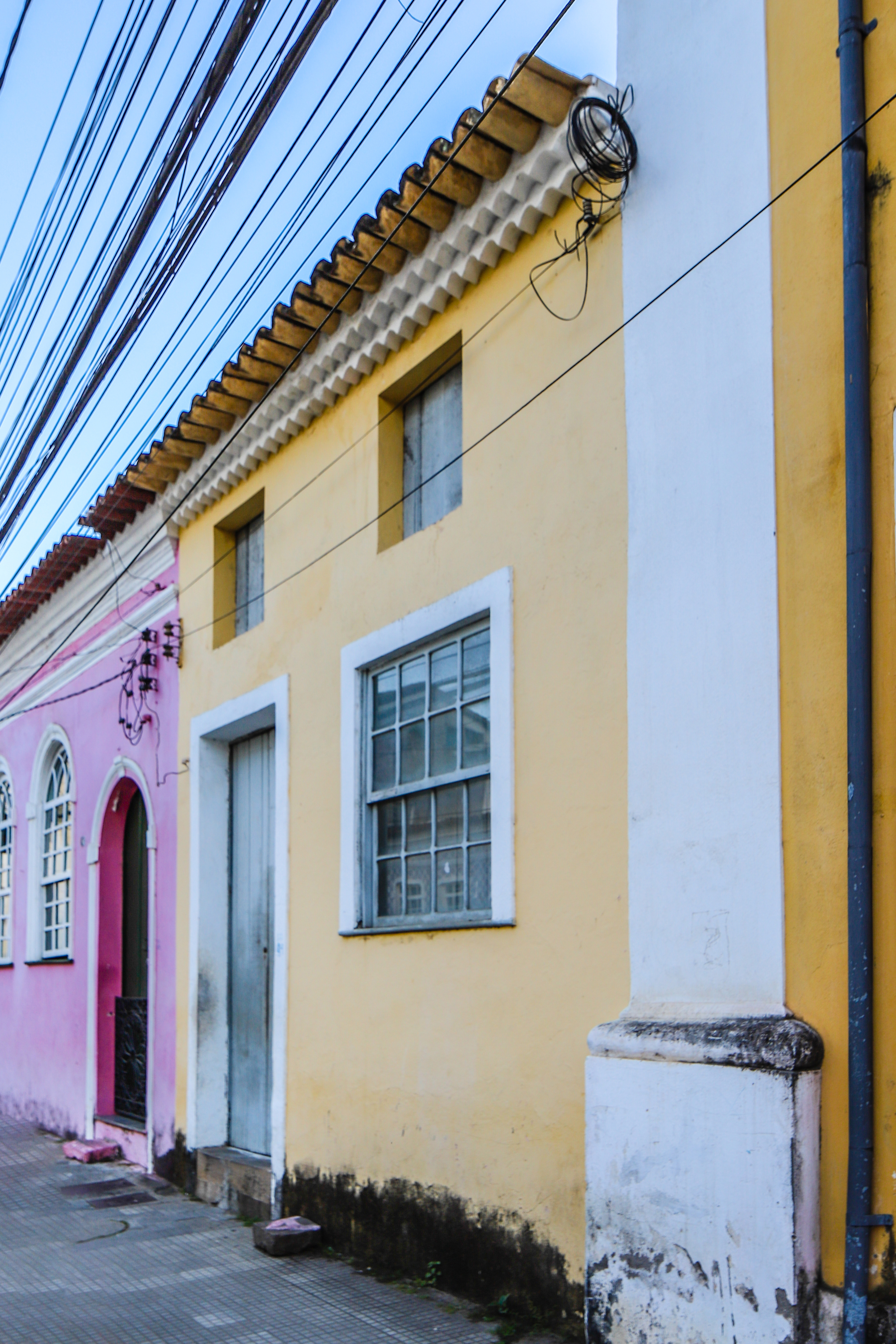
- House at No. 4 Rua Ana Nery, Cachoeira, Bahia

- Location within Brazil

General information
- Location: Rua Ana Nery, no. 4, Cachoeira, Bahia, Brazil
- Coordinates: 12.60489°S 38.96267°W

Technical details
- Floor count: 2
- Floor area: 122 square metres (1,310 ft^{2})

National Historic Heritage of Brazil
- Designated: 1941
- Reference no.: 246

House at No. 4 Rua Ana Nery (Portuguese: Casa à Rua Ana Nery, 4, or Sobrado à Rua Ana Nery, 4) is a house in Cachoeira, Bahia, Brazil. Its date of construction is unknown but is likely between the end of the 18th century and beginning of the 19th century. The house covers only 122 square metres (1,310 ft^{2}) and consists of two levels: a ground floor with simple compartments above. The house is noted as a representative example of vernacular Portuguese colonial domestic architecture of the 18th century. It was listed as a historic structure by the National Institute of Historic and Artistic Heritage in 1941. The House at No. 4 Rua Ana Nery is a private residence and may not be visited.

== Location ==
The House at No. 4 Rua Ana Nery is located on a street that connects Praça da Aclamação, the main public square of Cachoeira, with Praça Doutor Aristides Milton. It is adjacent to House at No. 2 Rua Ana Nery, one building removed from the Praça da Aclamação. The house is small in contrast to the House at No. 2, which has two stories and covers 680 square metres (7,300 ft^{2}), and has a privileged position at the corner of the public square and Rua Ana Nery.

== History ==
The House at No. 4 Rua Ana Nery was built in the 18th century after the development of the city center around Praça da Aclamação. Despite its small size, the house was built and occupied by privileged citizens of the city. Similar structures in Bahia serve as both a residence and small store at front with an attic to store goods above to protect from flooding. The House at No. 4 Rua Ana Nery, however, was used solely as a residence. It is included as a part of the Historic Center of Cachoeira.

== Structure ==
The House at No. 4 Rua Ana Nery is constructed of self-supporting mixed masonry walls of stone and brick. They support the floor and roof. Internal partitions of the house are of wood. The façade has a single door to the left, a square sash window the right, and two small square windows above. The window on the ground floor has two latticed shutters; all three windows sit on simple, straight lintels. It is covered by a gable roof ending in a small sloop.

The ground floor has a trapezoidal plan and consists of a living room, hallway, and two bedrooms. The corridor leads to the stairs and kitchen at the rear of the house. The kitchen is an annex of the original structure, and also irregular in shape. The house has a walled yard with a bathroom. A staircase leads to an attic of two interconnected compartments above.

== Protected status ==
The House at No. 4 Rua Ana Nery was listed as a protected historic site by the National Institute of Historic and Artistic Heritage in 1941 under inscription number 246.

== Access ==
The house functions as a private residence and may not be visited.
