= Governador Mangabeira =

Municipality of Bahia, Brazil

Coordinates: 12°36′07″S 39°02′34″W

- Municipality
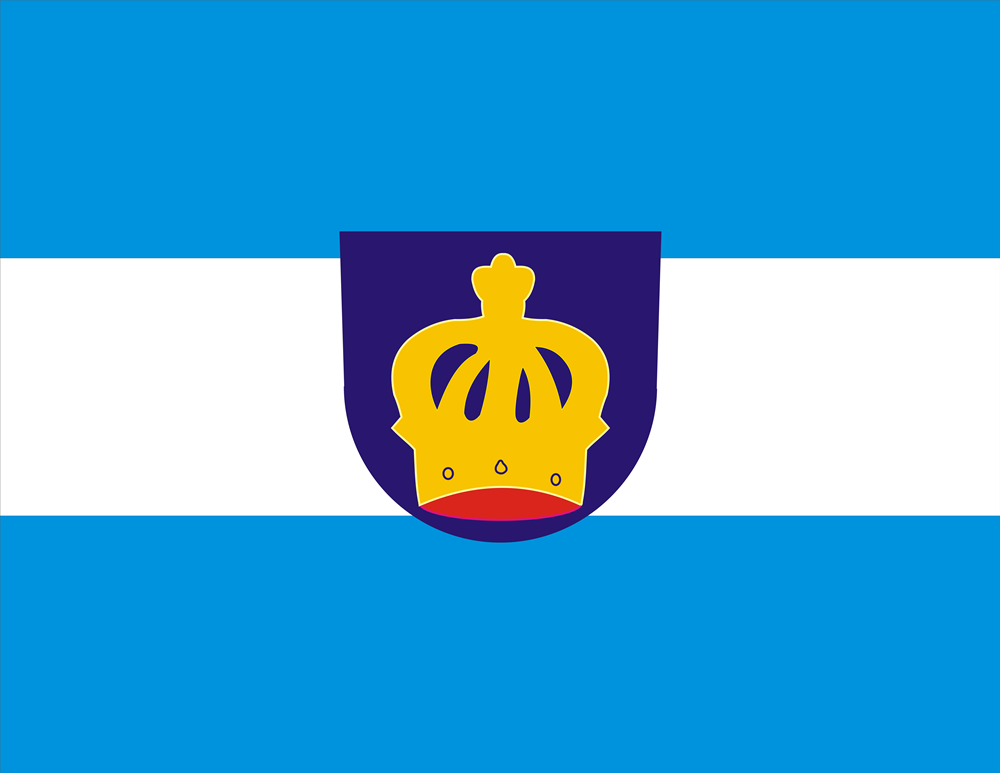
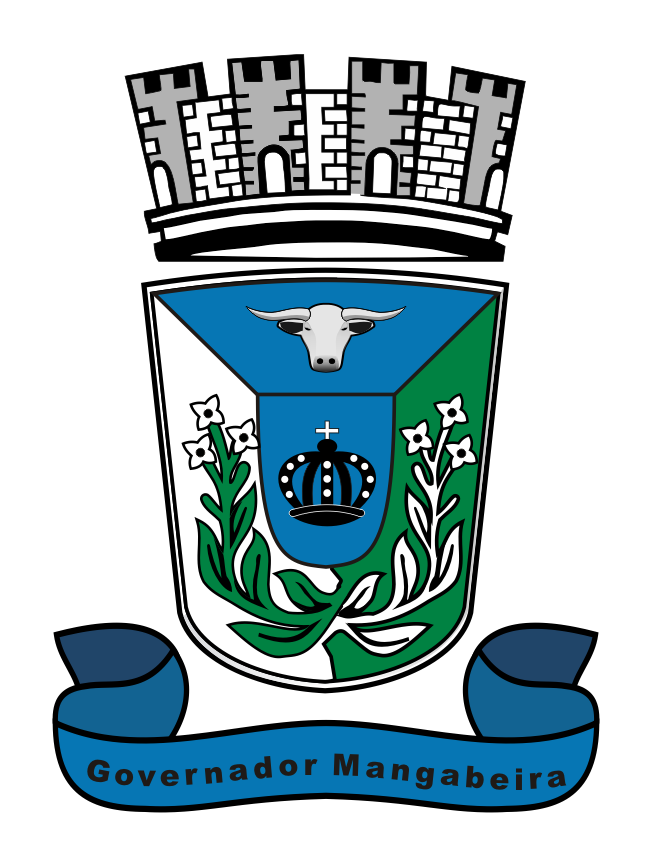
- Flag Coat of arms
- Interactive map of Governador Mangabeira
- Country: Brazil
- Region: Nordeste
- State: Bahia

Population (2020)
  - Total: 20,762
- Time zone: UTC−3 (BRT)

Governador Mangabeira is a municipality in the state of Bahia in the North-East region of Brazil.

== See also ==
- List of municipalities in Bahia
