= Town Hall of Cachoeira =

- Paço Municipal, formerly the Casa de Câmara e Cadeia
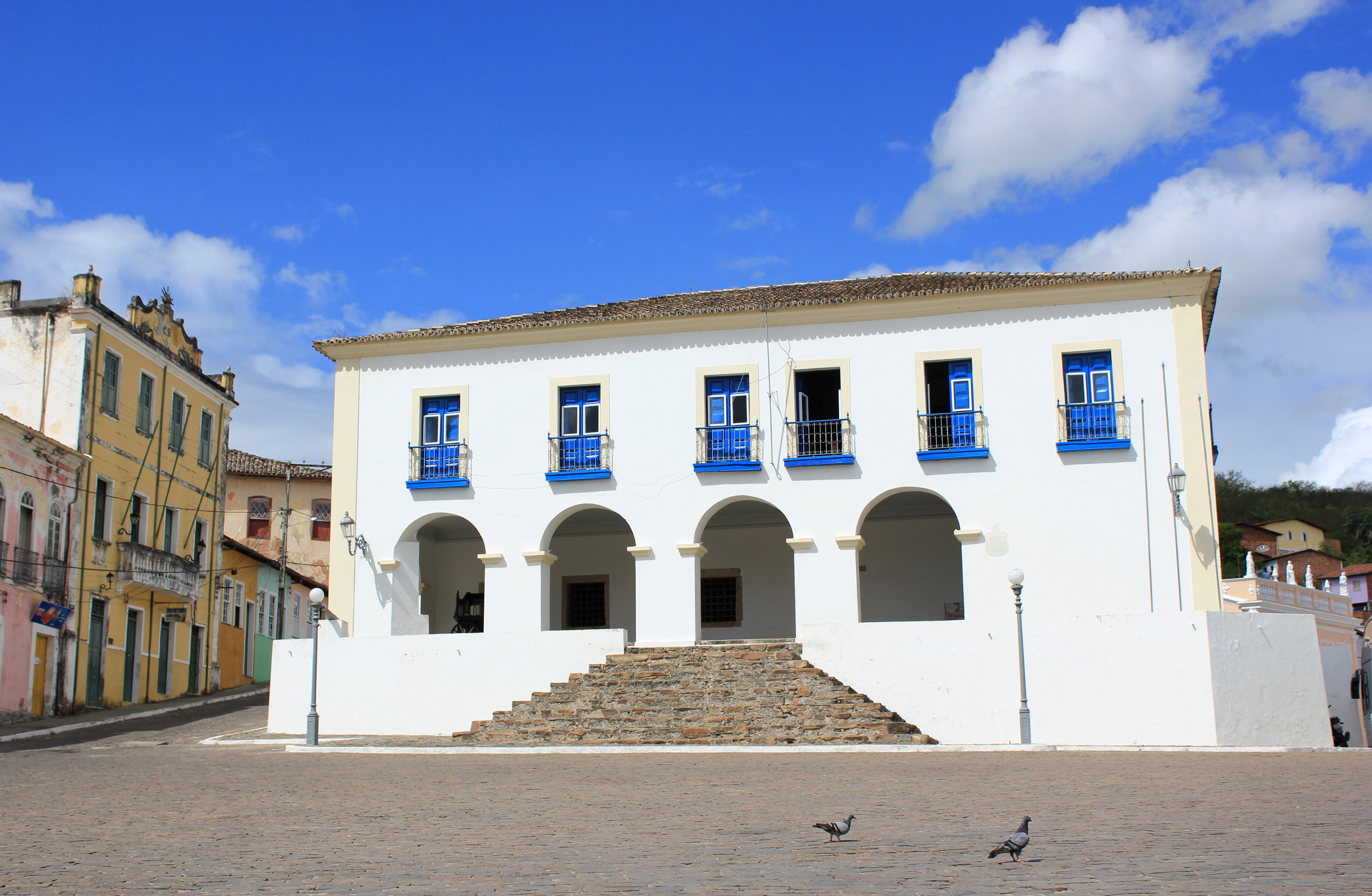
- Town Hall of Cachoeira, Cachoeira, Bahia, Brazil

General information
- Type: town hall
- Coordinates: 12°36′18.61″S 38°57′43.42″W
- Construction started: 1700
- Completed: 1712

Technical details
- Floor count: 2

National Historic Heritage of Brazil
- Designated: 1939
- Reference no.: 199

The Town Hall of Cachoeira (Portuguese: Paço Municipal, formerly the Portuguese: Casa de Câmara e Cadeia) is an 18th-century municipal building in Cachoeira, Bahia, Brazil. The building is located in the Historic Center of the city on the Praça da Aclamação, a public square. Construction of the building began in 1700 and was completed in 1712 following the establishment of Cachoeira by Royal Charter of 1693. Its design was influenced by the Town Hall of Salvador, completed in 1698, but is smaller in size than the Town Hall and Prison of Jaguaripe, completed in the same period. The town halls of Maragogipe and Santo Amaro are also in the same style. It was used by Brazilian independence forces in 1822 during the Brazilian War of Independence.

== Location ==
The town hall faces a broad boulevard that leads to the Paraguaçu River and a view of the municipality of São Felix on its opposite bank. The complex of the Church and Convent of Our Lady of Mount Carmel and the House of Prayer of the Carmelite Third Order sit to the left of the town hall.

== Structure ==
The Town Hall of Cachoeira has two stories and a broad, pyramidal staircase in stone. The floor plan is rectangular with a hipped roof. The first floor had two jail cells and a staircase; the second floor had two cells for upper-class prisoners and rooms to serve as municipal offices. The placement of windows and doors in the building is irregular; the windows of the second floor have iron balconets. They were installed in the 19th century, along with guillotine window frames, to replace simple shutters.

== Protected status ==
The Town Hall of Cachoeira was listed as a historic structure by the National Institute of Historic and Artistic Heritage in 1938 under inscription number 199.
