= Sincura =

Mountain range in Bahia, Brazil

The Sincura mountain range is in the Bahia state of eastern Brazil. It follows the Paraguaçu river which originates in the Chapada Diamantina highlands of central Bahia.

== The Diamond Mines ==
The area is famous for its mines known collectively as the Diamond Mines of Sincura. The rivers course followed a rich vein of diamonds which led to an influx of prospectors. These mines have taken their name from the mountain range to be known cumulatively as the mines of Sincura.

"The first individuals who established themselves at the mine of Sincura were mostly convicts and murderers; and their presence was marked by burnings and assassination. The difficulty of procuring sustenance in the country, and the danger incurred by those who came thither to exchange diamonds against the paper money of Brazil, prevented the respectable merchants from engaging in this commerce. But as the population, nevertheless, gradually increased, police regulations were adopted by the new colonists; and the working of the mine began then on an extended scale. The population, which in the previous August numbered only 8,000 souls, distributed amongst three townships, was at the close of July last upwards of 30,000, and is continually increasing. The villages now inhabited and worked are seven in number-Paraguassu, Combucas, Chique-Chique, Causu-Boa, Andrahy, Nagé, and Lancoës. The latter of these, twenty leagues distant from Paraguassu, contains alone 3,000 houses and 20,000 inhabitants. The central point of the diamond commerce is Para- guassu, which, though populous, has yet only twelve small houses of masonry. Nearly all the miners come thither on Saturday and Sunday, to sell the stones which they have collected during the week-taking back, in exchange, various articles of consumption, arms, and ready-made clothing, which come from Bahia at great cost. The diamonds found at Paraguassu are for the most part of a dun colour and very irregular conformation. Those of Lancoës are white, or light green, and nearly transparent as they come from the mine. They are octoedrical, and the most prized of any. It is often necessary to penetrate to a depth of three or four yards ere coming at the diamond stratum. Diamonds are gathered, too, in the stony ravines at the bottom of the Paraguassu itself, and of its tributary streams."

Source - (From The Maitland Mercury & Hunter River General Advertiser, the Athenaeum, Nov. 22)

== Sin Cura ==
(genitive cūrae); f, first declension

Care, give attention to, to take care of, concern, thought; trouble, solicitude; anxiety, concern, grief, sorrow. Attention, management, administration, charge, care; command, office; guardianship. Written work, writing. (medicine) Medical attendance, healing. (agriculture) Rearing, culture, care. (rare) An attendant, guardian, observer. vocative singular of cūra
