= Paraguaçu River =

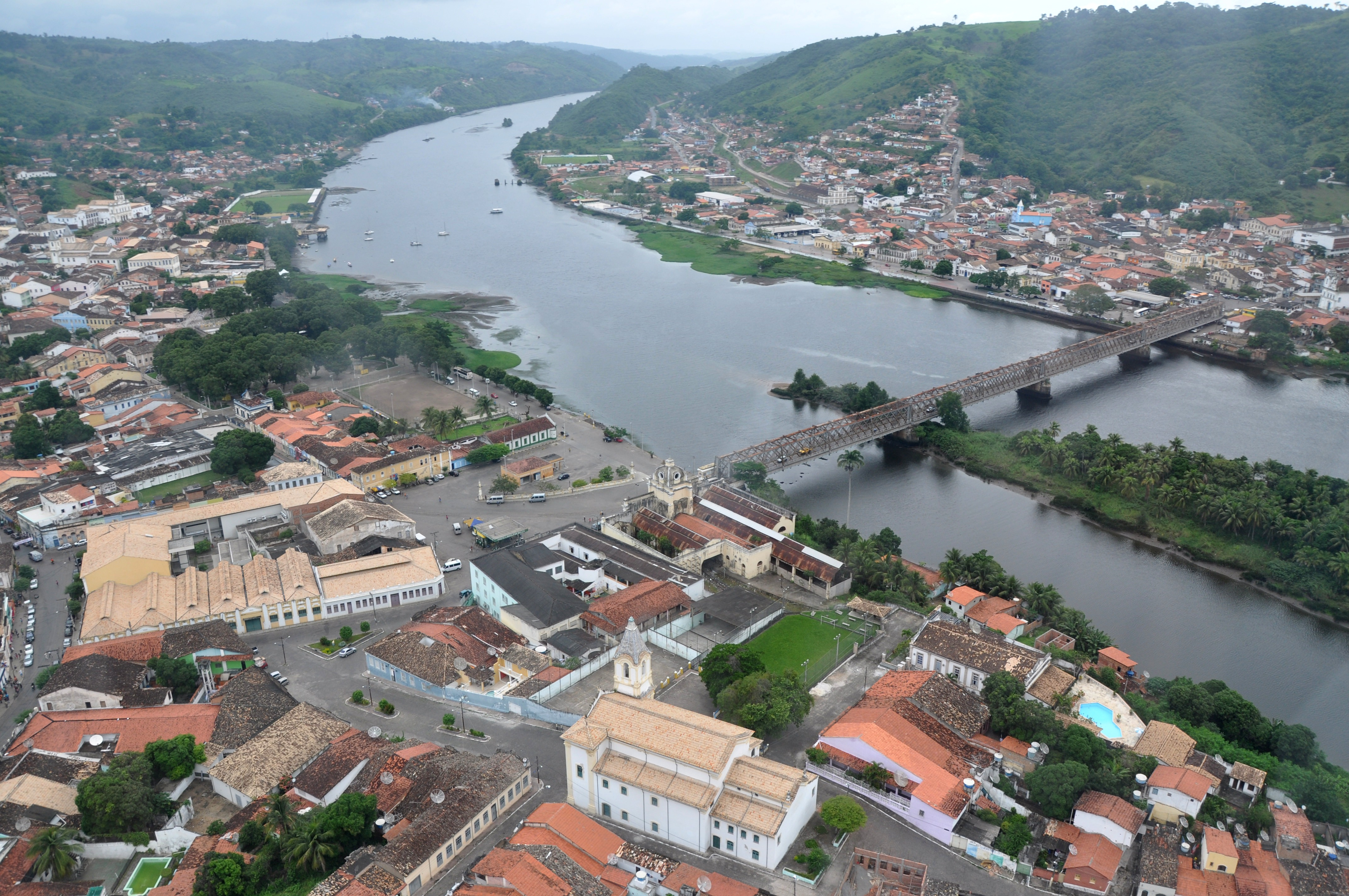
- The river between Cachoeira (left) and São Félix (right)

- Location within Brazil
- Native name: Rio Paraguaçu (Portuguese)

Location
- Country: Brazil

Physical characteristics
- Mouth
  - location: Baía de Todos os Santos
  - coordinates: 12.833597°S 38.794503°W
- Length: 500 km (310 mi)
- Basin size: 54,877 km^{2} (21,188 sq mi)
- Discharge
  - average: 103 m^{3}/s (3,600 cu ft/s)

The Paraguaçu River (Portuguese: Rio Paraguaçu) is a river in Bahia state, located in eastern Brazil. It runs 500 kilometres (310 mi) from the Chapada Diamantina highlands of central Bahia to its mouth at the Baía de Todos os Santos. The Paraguaçu River is the largest river entirely within Bahia. Its banks are fertile and the cities at its mouth are navigable. It served as a main route of transportation and communication of the entire region both in the pre-Colonial and Portuguese Colonial period. Its lower reaches are home to the Baía do Iguape Marine Extractive Reserve, created in 2000.

== Etymology ==
The word "Paraguaçu" is of Tupi language origin and means "great river". It is a combination of the words "pará", meaning river; and "gûasu", meaning great. In the colonial period it was variously spelled as Paraguaçu, Paraoçu, Paraossu, Peroguaçu, Perasu, Peoassu, or Peruassu.

== Course ==
The Paraguaçu River originates in the Chapada Diamantina highlands of central Bahia following the chain of mountains called Sincura and flows east 500 kilometres (310 mi) to empty into the Baía de Todos os Santos. Its course can be divided into two region: the sertão at its upper course and the Recôncavo at its lower course.

The Paraguaçu supports cattle farms in the dry sertão region. In the past the river was a transport point for cattle from the wider sertão regions of Bahia and Minas Gerais. Tropeiros, cattle drivers of the sertão region, built shelters for rest along the region. Farmers built small chapels dedicated to patron saints of the region.

The lower reaches of the Paraguaçu cross the Recôncavo, a fertile region that supported sugar cane and tobacco plantation. These were accompanied by sugar mills and cigar factories. The Recôncavo contained the largest population of African slaves in the early Portuguese colonial period; the region remained a center of slavery until the abolition of slavery in 1888. The lower reaches of the river is rich in convents and churches of the colonial period, notably in São Félix, Cachoeira, and Maragojipe.

40 kilometres (25 mi) of the river are navigable; this segment ranges from the municipality of Cachoeira to the mouth of the river.

The river widens into the Iguape Bay at the end of its course, an arm of the Bay of All Saints (Baia de Todos os Santos). The Iguape Bay is protected by the 10,074 hectares (24,890 acres) Baía do Iguape Marine Extractive Reserve, created in 2000.

== History ==
Numerous heritage sites are located along the river, including the historic centers of Jaguaripe, Cachoeira, and São Felix. The Parish Church of Santiago and ruins of the Convent and Church of Saint Antony are located on the Iguape estuary.

The river's course followed a rich vein of diamonds which led to an influx of prospectors. These mines have taken their name from the mountain range to be known cumulatively as the mines of Sincura.

The river flooded in December 1989 following heavy rain. The flood affected 175 towns and cities and caused landslides. The flooding killed 35 and displaced 200,000 people.

== Sources ==
- RESEX Marinha da Baía do Iguape (in Portuguese), ISA: Instituto Socioambiental
