= Garden of Hospital São João de Deus =

Historical structure in Bahia, Brazil

- Jardim do Hospital São João de Deus
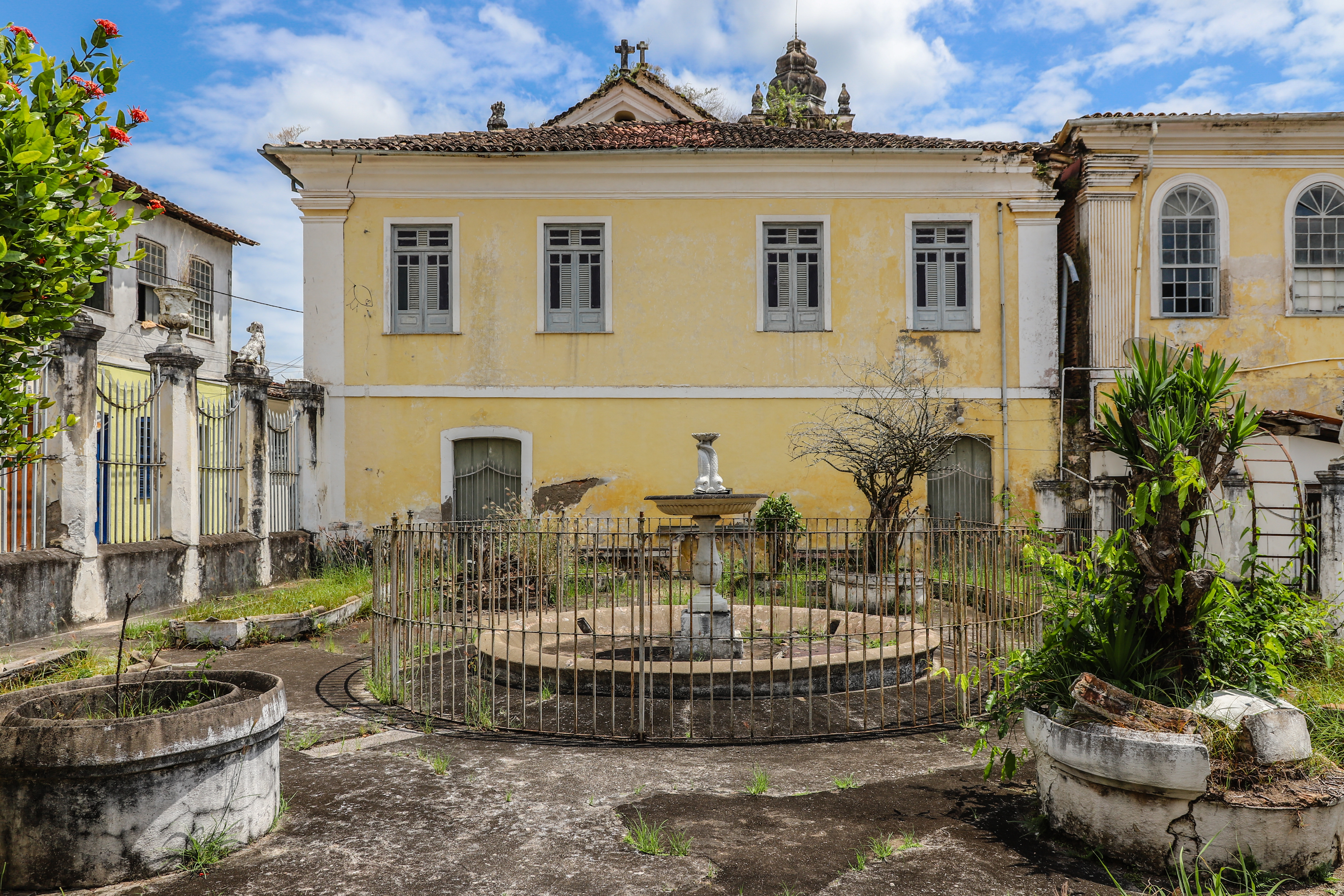
- View of the Garden of Hospital São João de Deus, Cachoeira, Brazil

- Location within Brazil
- Location: Cachoeira, Bahia
- Coordinates: 12.601533°S 38.963039°W
- Established: 1912; 114 years ago
- Status: Abandoned

National Historic Heritage of Brazil
- Designated: 1939
- Reference no.: 202

The Garden of Hospital São João de Deus (Portuguese: Jardim do Hospital São João de Deus) is an abandoned garden in Cachoeira, Bahia, Brazil. It is part of the São João de Deus Hospital architectural ensemble that includes a hospital building, a large Baroque-style church of the early 18th century that faces Praça Dr. Aristides Milton, and a set of houses built by the Santa Casa da Misericórdia along Rua Durval Chagas. The garden is located to the rear of the chapel. The garden was listed as a historic structure by National Institute of Historic and Artistic Heritage (IPHAN) in 1938; five of the ceramic objects that crown the columns of the garden were listed separately the same year.

== History ==
Frei Antônio Machado of the Church of Belém da Cachoeira founded the Hospital de Caridade de Cachoeira (Cachoeira Charity Hospital) in 1729 near the city center. It was donated to the Order of Saint John of God of Lisbon in 1754, and passed to the Santa Casa da Misericórdia in 1826. The church of the hospital and Chapel of Hospital São João de Deus (Capela do Hospital São João de Deus), a large-scale Baroque structure of the early 18th century, had a churchyard to the rear. It was converted into a French-style garden in 1912.

== Description ==
The Garden of Hospital São João de Deus was designed in the French style of the early 20th century. It has beds of geometric design with a marble fountain at center; it features three interlaced dolphins at its center. The garden is surrounded by large columns crowned by ceramic objects in the shape of vases, dogs, and pine cones. Five of the ceramic objects were imported from the Santo António do Vale da Piedade factory in Vila Nova de Gaia, Portugal. The marble carvings of the fountain are likely from Lisbon, but no documentation attests to their origin.

The garden was abandoned in the 20th century and is in an advanced state of decay. Its furniture was robbed or lost. Traces of the garden beds, the fountain, and columns remain. The ceramic decorative elements remain, but are in poor condition.

== Protected status ==
The Garden of Hospital São João de Deus was listed as a protected historic site by the National Institute of Historic and Artistic Heritage in 1939 under inscription number 202.

== Access ==
The garden is not open to the public and may not be visited; the distinctive ceramic crowns of the columns remain visible along Rua Durval Chagas.
