= Chapel of Our Lady of Help (Cachoeira) =

Roman Catholic church in Bahia, Brazil

- Capela de Nossa Senhora da Ajuda
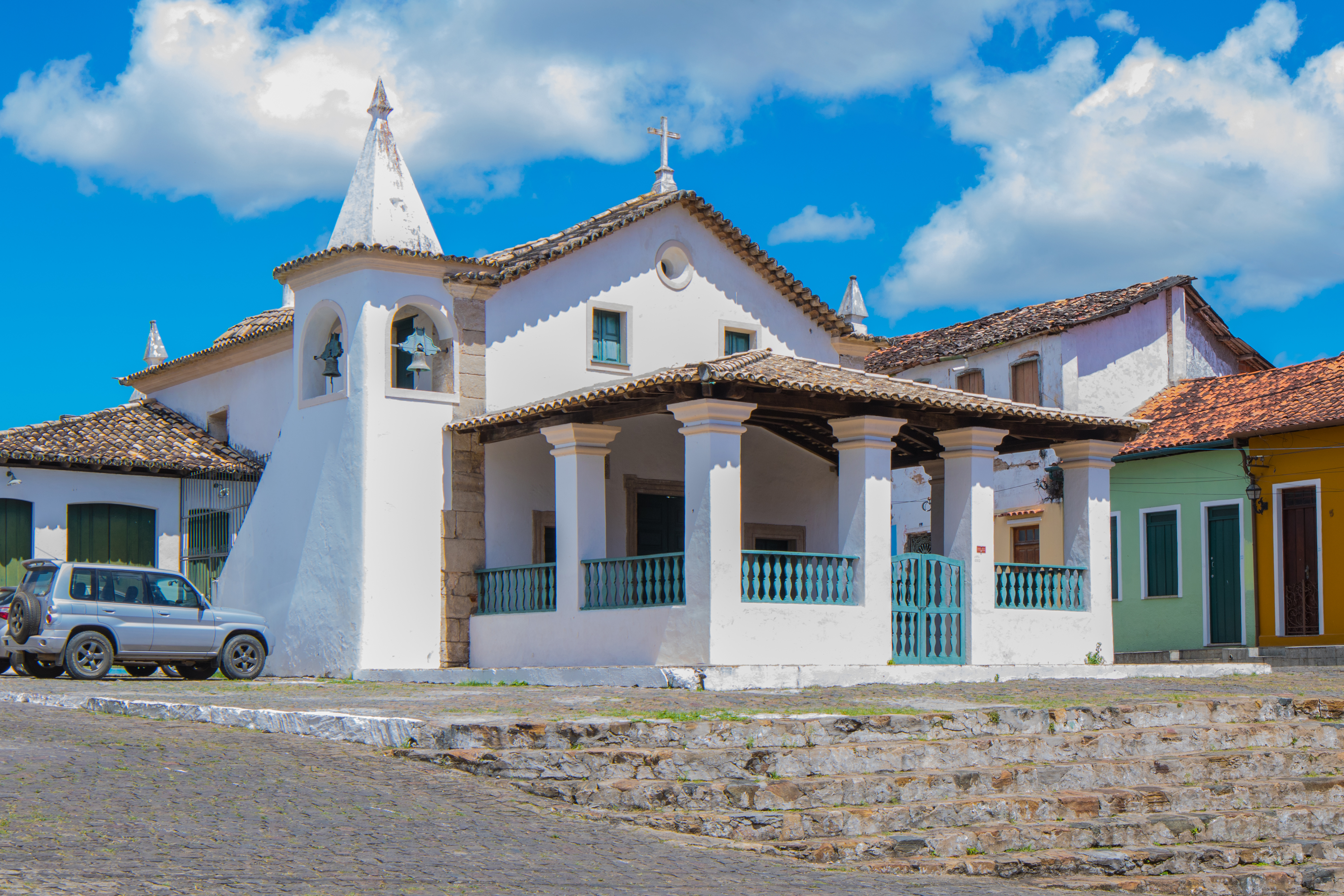
- Chapel of Our Lady of Help, Cachoeira

- Location of the Chapel of Our Lady of Help in Brazil

Religion
- Affiliation: Catholic
- Rite: Roman
- Patron: Our Lady of Help

Location
- Municipality: Cachoeira
- State: Bahia
- Country: Brazil
- Interactive map of Chapel of Our Lady of Help
- Coordinates: 12.603635°S 38.963475°W

Architecture
- Established: 1687

National Historic Heritage of Brazil
- Designated: 1939
- Reference no.: 198

The Chapel of Our Lady of Help (Portuguese: Capela de Nossa Senhora da Ajuda, Capela da Ajuda) is a 17th-century Roman Catholic church located in Cachoeira, Bahia, Brazil. It is the first church built in Cachoeira as part of the Adorno family sugar plantation and is home to the Brotherhood of Our Lady of Help (Irmandade de Nossa Senhora da Ajuda). The church is likewise dedicated to Our Lady of Help. The chapel attracts a large number of pilgrims devoted to Our Lady of Help. The chapel was listed as a historic structure by National Institute of Historic and Artistic Heritage (IPHAN) in 1939.

== History ==
Álvaro Rodrigues Celestino Adorno, son of Antônio Dias Adorno, built a chapel on a hill dedicated to Our Lady of the Rosary between 1595 and 1606. João Rodrigues Adorno, great-grandson and heir of the properties of Álvaro Adorno, rebuilt the church between 1673 and 1687. The chapel was rebuilt using stone and lime. Father Miguel de Araújo Adorno, son of John R. Adorno, celebrated the first Mass of the new chapel in October 1686, apparently prior to its completion. The church became associated with the Fraternity of São Pedro dos Clérigos in this period; the extinction of the order provoked the abandoned of the church. Musicians from the Brotherhood of Our Lady of Help visited the church in 1872 and became associated with the church.

== Location ==
The Chapel of Our Lady of Help sits atop a hill within Cachoeira and is approached by three steeply sloped streets. Its frontispiece faces west towards the Paraguaçu River. The chapel sits as part of a complex of numerous sobrados of the sugar mill of the Adorno family. The much larger Parish Church of Our Lady of the Rosary was completed at the base of the Ladeira da Ajuda by the beginning of the 18th century. The chapel was once a focal point of Cachoeira, due to its placement on a hill, but is now surrounded by the urban growth of the city.

== Structure ==
The Chapel of Our Lady of Help is notable in Bahia for the simplicity of its design and proportions. It consists of a nave, chancel, sacristy, porch, and bell tower. The church has a simple, central portal of wood with a window on either side. The church roof is of two types: a gable roof over the nave and a cupola of tiled brick over the chancel. The bell tower and choir are accessed via an external stairway, a feature common to other early churches in Brazil. Two choir windows and an oculus sit above the porch. The church is flanked by a small pyramidal bell tower with a tin roof; it is of later construction. The interior of the chapel has images of Saint Francis of Assisi, Saint Benedict, Saint Lucia, Saint Cajetan (Saint Caetano), and Saint Peter. The pulpit is surmounted by a stone stair.

The chapel is noted for its porch, which is covered by a sloping roof and surrounded by a wooden railing; the porch was once a closed narthex to the church. Chapels with a porch of this type in Bahia are only found in churches built in the 16th and 17th century; its design closely resembles that of Chapel of Our Lady of the Ladder (Capela de Nossa Senhora da Escada) in Salvador and the Chapel of Saint Joseph of Jenipapo (Capela de São José do Jenipapo) in Castro Alves. The church portal is accessed from the porch and has a low window on either side.

The small attached hall to the right of the building dates to the 19th century.

== Protected status ==
The Chapel of Our Lady of Help was listed as a historic structure by the National Institute of Historic and Artistic Heritage in 1939. Both the structure and its contents were included in the IPHAN directive under inscription number 198.
