= Chapel of Our Lady of the Ladder =

16th-century church in Salvador, Bahia, Brazil

- Capela de Nossa Senhora da Escada
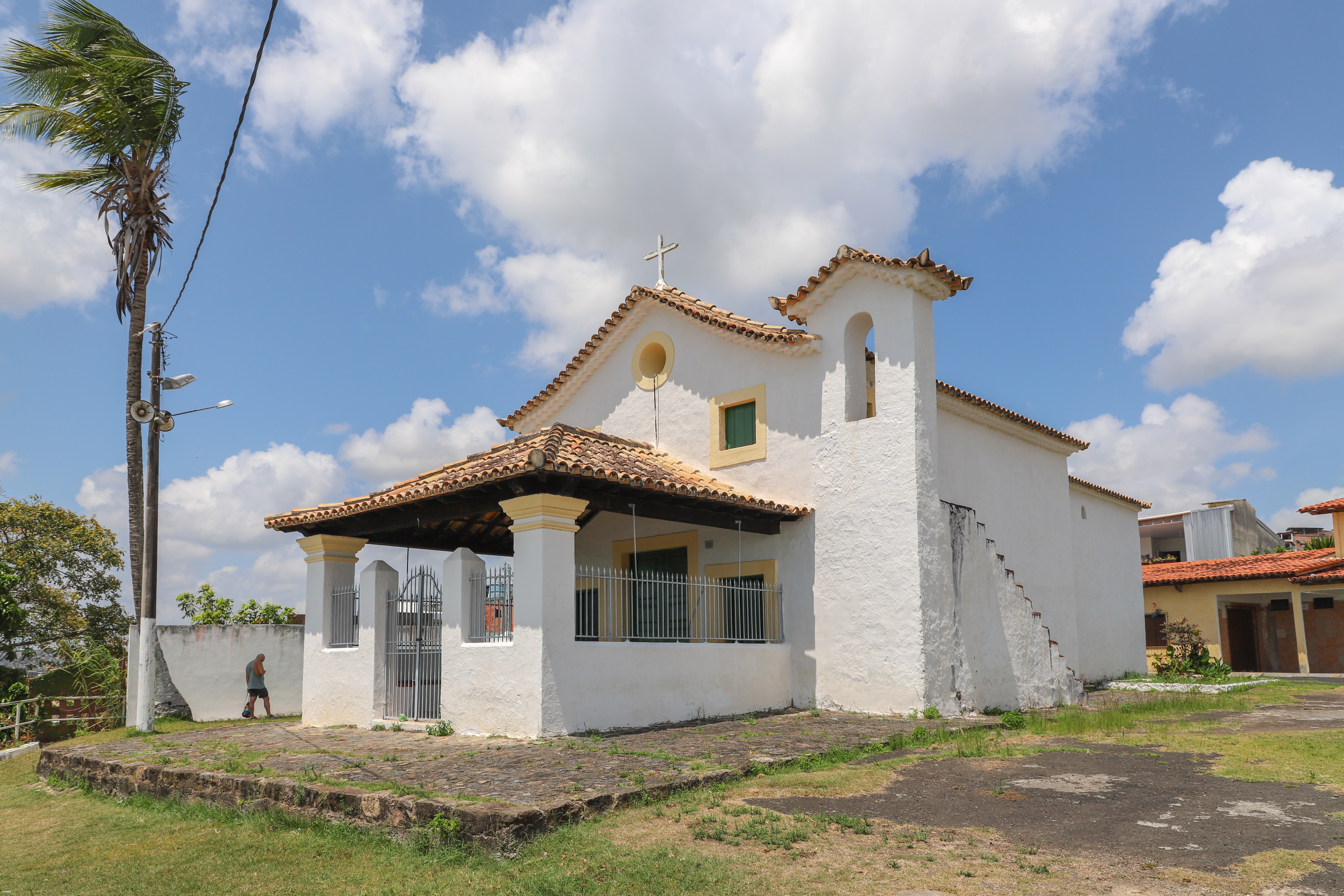
- Chapel of Our Lady of the Ladder, Salvador, Bahia

- Location of the Chapel of Our Lady of the Ladder in Brazil

Religion
- Affiliation: Catholic
- Diocese: Escada
- Rite: Roman
- Ownership: Roman Catholic Archdiocese of São Salvador da Bahia

Location
- Municipality: Salvador
- State: Bahia
- Country: Brazil
- Interactive map of Chapel of Our Lady of the Ladder
- Coordinates: 12.881213°S 38.482839°W

Architecture
- Style: Baroque
- Founder: Lázaro Arévolo
- Established: 1566
- Direction of façade: West

National Historic Heritage of Brazil
- Designated: 1962
- Reference no.: 560

The Chapel of Our Lady of the Ladder (Portuguese: Capela de Nossa Senhora da Escada) is a 16th-century Roman Catholic church located in Salvador, Bahia, Brazil. It was constructed as part of the Nossa Senhora de Escada sugar plantation by Lázaro Arévolo, likely in 1566; he donated the chapel to the Jesuits in the late 16th century. The chapel is part of the Roman Catholic Archdiocese of São Salvador da Bahia; it was listed as a historic structure by the National Institute of Historic and Artistic Heritage (IPHAN) in 1962. It and the Church and Monastery of Our Lady of Monserrate are the only remaining 16th-century chapels in Salvador.

== History ==
The chapel was the scene of an invasion by Dutch forces during their takeover of Salvador as part of the Dutch occupation of Brazil. John Maurice, Prince of Nassau-Siegen, used the site to invade Salvador in April and May 1638. A stone plaque was placed on an exterior wall in 1930 to commemorate the event.

== Structure ==
The chapel includes a nave, altar, sacristy, choir, enclosed porch, and belfry. The chapel, with its enclosed porch, resembles the Chapel of Our Lady of Help (Capela de Nossa Senhora da Ajuda) in Cachoeira; Chapel of Saint Joseph of Jenipapo (Capela de São José do Jenipapo) in Castro Alves; and the Chapel of Saint Antony of Velásquez in Vera Cruz, Itaparica Island. An image of Our Lady of the Ladder dates to the 18th century. The pulpit is accessed via an outer stair.

== Protected status ==
The National Institute of Historic and Artistic Heritage restored the façade of the chapel in 1966, removing its Baroque-style pediment and restoring its design, in theory, to its original form. Further work was carried out to stabilize the building structure due to the risk of collapse in 2007.

== Protected status ==
The Chapel of Our Lady of the Ladder was listed as a historic structure by the National Institute of Historic and Artistic Heritage in 1962.

== Access ==
The Chapel of Our Lady of the Ladder is open to the public and may be visited.
