= Parish Church of Our Lady of the Rosary =

Church in Cachoeira, Brazil

- Igreja Matriz de Nossa Senhora do Rosário
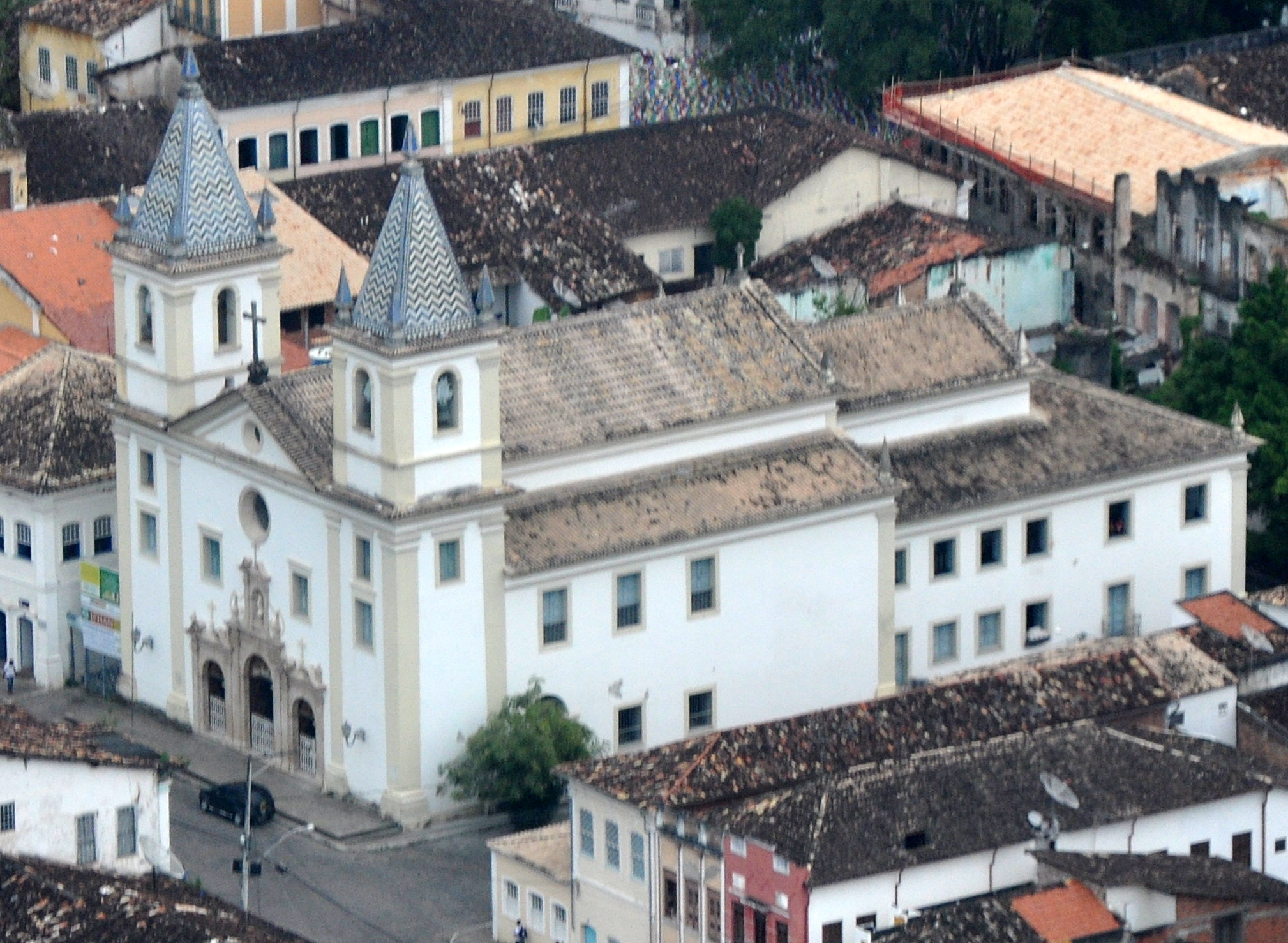
- Aerial view of the Parish Church of Our Lady of the Rosary

- Location of the Parish Church of Our Lady of the Rosary in Brazil

Religion
- Affiliation: Catholic
- Rite: Roman

Location
- Municipality: Cachoeira
- State: Bahia
- Country: Brazil
- Interactive map of Parish Church of Our Lady of the Rosary
- Coordinates: 12.604592°S 38.963073°W

Architecture
- Style: Baroque
- Funded by: John V of Portugal
- Completed: 1754

National Historic Heritage of Brazil
- Designated: 1939
- Reference no.: 198

The Parish Church of Our Lady of the Rosary (Portuguese: Igreja Matriz de Nossa Senhora do Rosário) is a 17th-century Roman Catholic church in Cachoeira, Bahia, Brazil. Its construction began in the late 17th century and was completed in the 1750s, likely in 1754. The church was listed as a historic structure by National Institute of Historic and Artistic Heritage (IPHAN) in 1939. The church is dedicated to Our Lady of the Rosary and is constructed in the Baroque style.

== History ==
Construction of Parish Church of Our Lady of the Rosary began at the end of the late 17th century and continued into the next century. Funding for the church came from the local population and the Portuguese crown. King John V of Portugal donated eight thousand cruzados for the construction of the main chapel, sacristy, and an administrative office, the casa de fábrica for its administrator, Francisco Amorim da Silva. Tile panels were installed in 1750.

A commission, which consisted of an engineer, bricklayer, and carpenter, surveyed the building in 1754 and found the construction of the church to be satisfactory, but at a cost that exceeded the donation of the crown. Francisco Amorim da Silva's request for reimbursement by the Treasury was granted in the same year, implying that construction of the church was completed per instructions of the Portuguese colonial government.

The church was the scene of bloody struggles by groups divided over its administration in 1842.

== Location ==
The Mother Church of Our Lady of the Rosary forms a small block between Ana Nery Street and 13 de Maio Square in the lower part of the city. It was built in close proximity to the much smaller Chapel of Our Lady of Help (Capela de Nossa Senhora da Ajuda), which sits above the church on the Ladeira da Ajuda. The church is located close to the banks of the Paraguaçu River and has been subject to flooding. Its main façade faces Ana Nery Street to the east and provides a clear view to the interior of the city. The church tower provides a view of the city of Cachoeira and parts of São Felix, which is located on opposite bank of the Paraguaçu River. The church is part of the Historical Center of Cachoeira.

== Structure ==
The church has a rectangular plan with a single nave. It has two side aisles superposed by tribunes and a cross sacristy; these are features common to churches of the period. It has walls of mixed masonry of stone and brick. The design of the frontispiece was inspired by two churches: that of the Church of Saint Bartolomeu in neighboring Maragogipe and the Church of Santo Antônio da Barra in Salvador. The portal of the church is of richly carved lioz stone with within three arches.

The frontispiece is flanked by two towers with pyramidal towers; they are glazed in tile in a distinctive zig-zag pattern, an element common to the Seminary of Belém, also in Cachoeira; the churches of Boa Viagem and Santa Casa de Misericórdia both in Salvador, and the Convent of Saint Antonio in the municipality of São Francisco do Conde. The church interior is richly decorated with numerous azulejos measuring 4 meter high. They are among the most important in Brazil and are typical of those produced in Lisbon in the 1750s.

The ceiling of the nave is of wood and painted in the Italian trompe-l'œil illusionist style; they were executed by José Joaquim da Rocha. Medallions are also painted in choir and sacristy areas. Carving work in the church from the 18th century is seen in the sacristy, pulpits, and tribunes. Other carvings date to a 19th-century renovation of the church in the Neoclassical style.

Carvings of lioz, a stone imported from Portugal, covers parts of the interior; this is an element common to 18th-century churches in Salvador, notably the churches of Pilar, Conceição da Praia and Lapa. Lioz carvings are found in the baptismal font, two seashell basins, and the stairway of the presbytery, and a lavabo with carvings of dolphins.

== Protected status ==
The Mother Church of Our Lady of the Rosary was listed as a historic structure by the National Institute of Historic and Artistic Heritage in 1939. It was listed in the Book of Historical Works no 198.
