= São João de Deus Hospital =

Building in Cachoeira, Bahia, Brazil

- Hospital São João de Deus
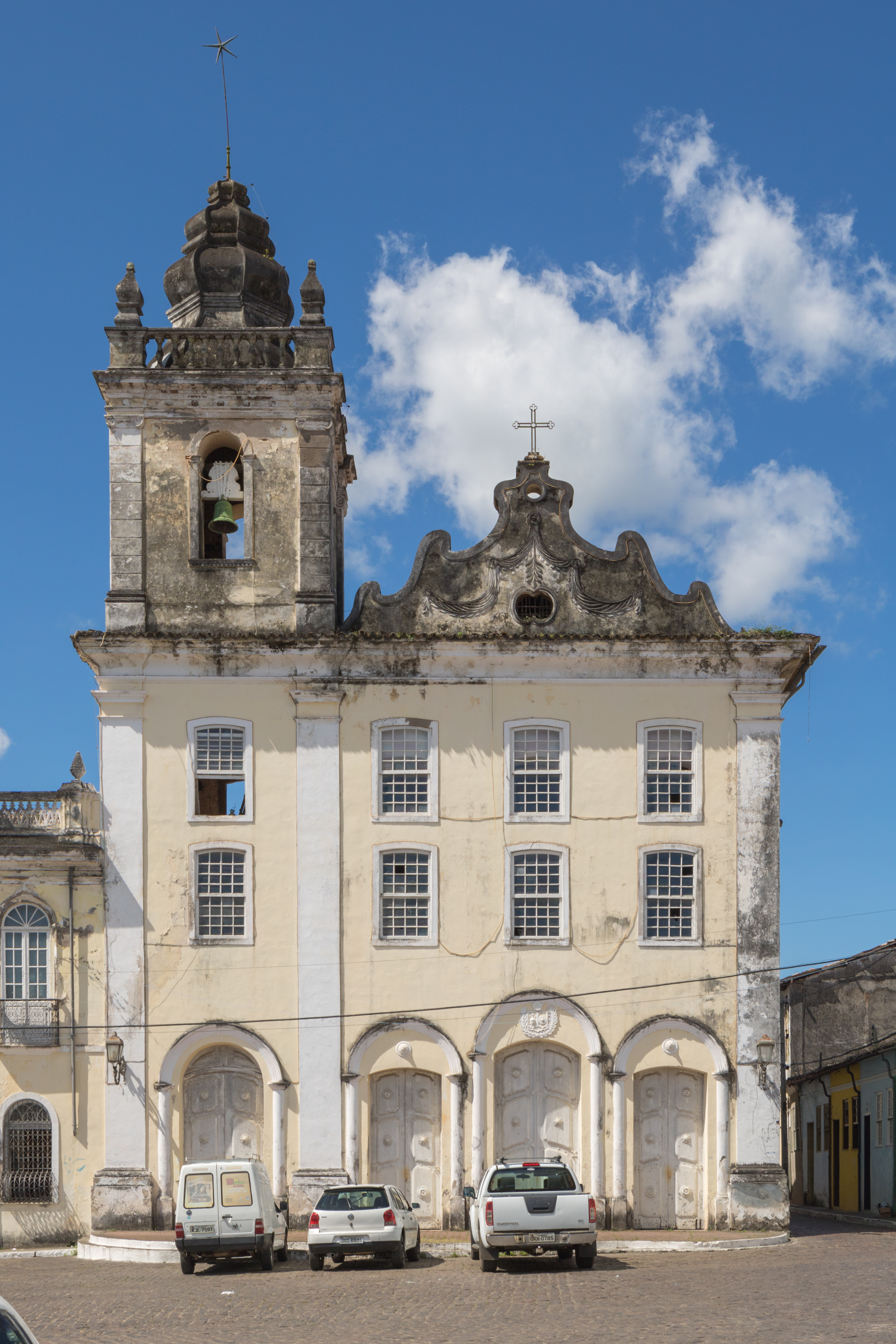
- Chapel of São João de Deus Hospital.

- Location within Brazil

General information
- Type: Historical
- Location: Cachoeira, Bahia, Brazil
- Coordinates: 12°36′07″S 38°57′48″W

São João de Deus Hospital is a building located in Cachoeira, a town in the Brazilian state of Bahia. It gives its name to the architectural ensemble that includes the hospital building, a large early 18th-century Baroque style church in front of Dr. Aristides Milton square, a garden located at the back of the chapel, and a group of houses built by the Santa Casa da Misericórdia along Durval Chagas street.

Friar Antônio Machado from Church of Belém da Cachoeira founded the Hospital de Caridade de Cachoeira (Cachoeira's Charity Hospital) in 1729, near the town's center. It was donated to the Order of Saint John of God of Lisbon in 1754, having been transferred to the Santa Casa da Misericórdia in 1826. Its chapel was listed by the National Institute of Historic and Artistic Heritage (IPHAN) in 1943, through process number 248. Its surrounding garden was listed in 1940, through process number 202.

== History ==
The former Hospital da Caridade de Cachoeira was created by Friar Antônio Machado from Nossa Senhora de Belém in 1729. The order of St. John of God of Lisbon received it as a donation in 1754, and it was then handed over to the Santa Casa da Misericórdia in 1826. The current hospital dates from the second half of the 19th century, but follows the convent-style plan adopted during the colonial period by the Santa Casas, although its exterior is neoclassical. In 1912, the churchyard was turned into a garden. The chapel was listed by IPHAN in 1943 as a fine arts monument (Entry 285/1943), and the garden was listed in 1940 as an archaeological, ethnographic and landscape monument (Entry 09/1940).

It is one of the first hospitals in Brazil, built with the consent of Joseph I, King of Portugal. It was built with the efforts of a local mill owner, Antônio Machado Velho, who would later become a friar. Historical records of this time are preserved in the Annals of the National Library of Rio de Janeiro. During the outbreak of the cholera epidemic in Cachoeira, the São João de Deus Hospital had to be closed to be disinfected. Beds, tables, clothes, books were burned, and the organization suffered a great financial impact. The chaplain and the doctor were dismissed, and the hospital was left without a doctor, relying only on the voluntary help of Dr. Noberto Francisco de Assis.

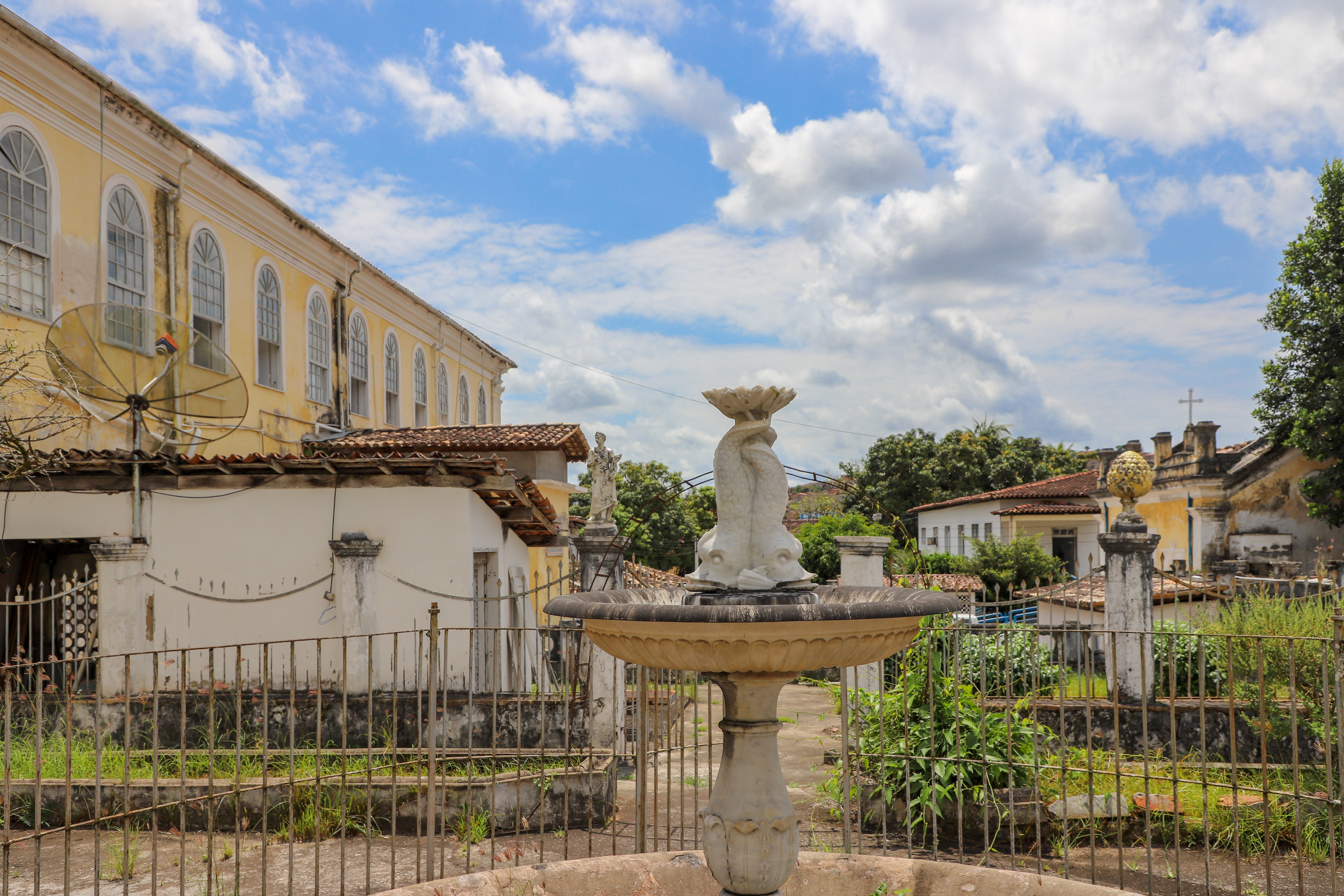
The back of the hospital as seen from the garden.

In 1939, the garden underwent the process of historic listing with the National Institute of Historic and Artistic Heritage (IPHAN), the Brazilian Federal Government agency responsible for ensuring the preservation of national memory.

== Architecture ==
The hospital is built around a courtyard, with the chapel on one side. It has a nave and a single side aisle, a transverse sacristy surmounted by a table room and tribunes in the nave and chancel and choir (a second choir was never completed). The front facade shows two rows of superimposed choir windows and a single tower. The garden, meanwhile, is of French type, although late, with geometrically designed flowerbeds and a railing with columns crowned by pots, pine cones, dogs and lions made of pottery. The center of the garden is marked by a marble fountain with three dolphins.

=== Garden ===
Garden of São João de Deus Hospital
- Jardim do Hospital São João de Deus
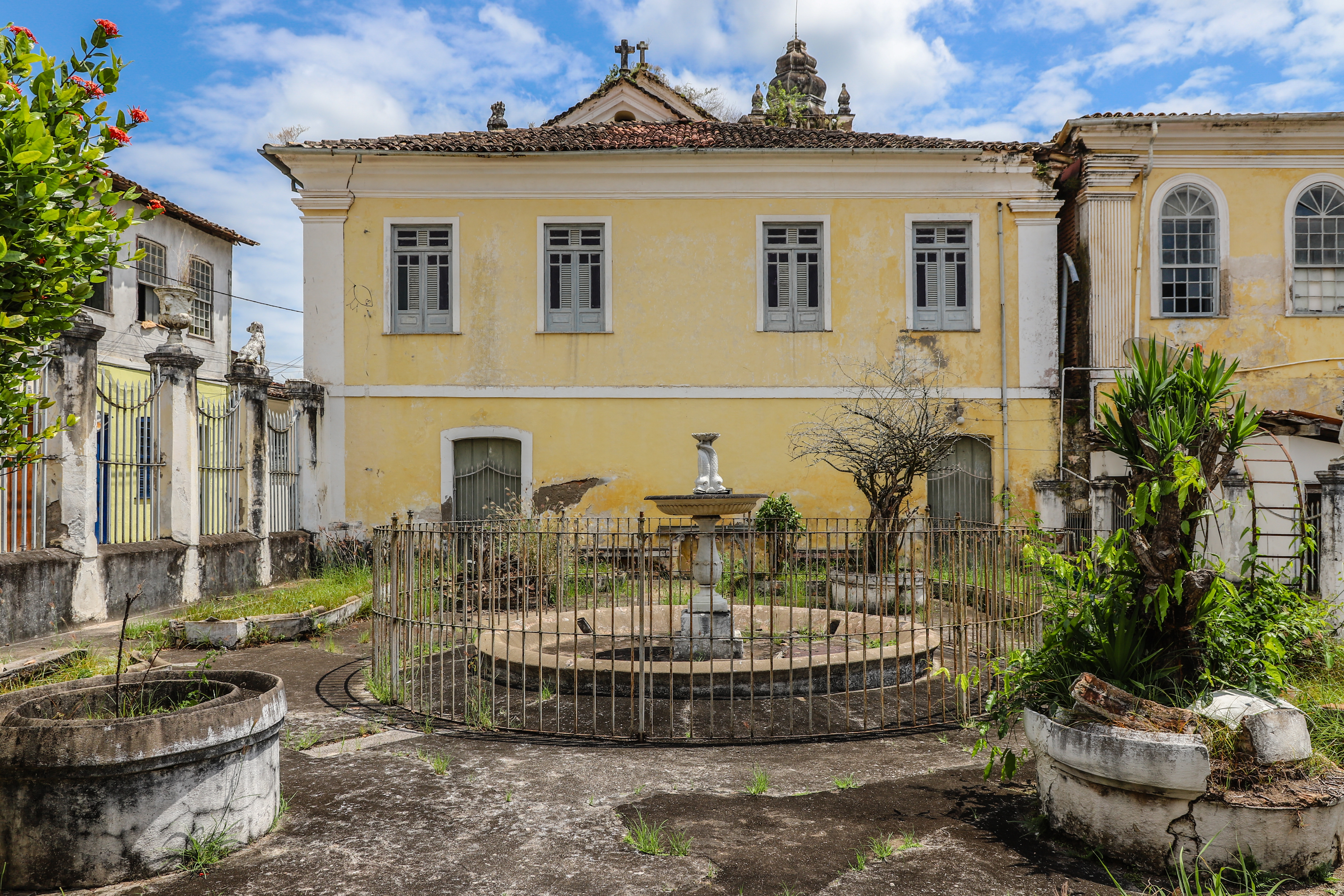
- View of the Garden of São João de Deus Hospital, Cachoeira, Brazil
- Interactive map of Garden of São João de Deus Hospital
- Coordinates: 12.601533°S 38.963039°W
- Established: 1912; 114 years ago
- Status: Abandoned

National Historic Heritage of Brazil
- Designated: 1939
- Reference no.: 202

The Garden of the São João de Deus Hospital is an abandoned garden and is located at the back of the chapel. The garden was listed as a historic structure by the National Institute of Historic and Artistic Heritage (IPHAN) in 1938; five of the ceramic objects crowning the garden's columns were listed separately in the same year.

The Church of the Hospital and Chapel of the São João de Deus Hospital (Capela do Hospital São João de Deus), a large Baroque structure from the early 18th century, had a churchyard at the back. This churchyard was converted into a French-style garden in 1912. The Garden of the São João de Deus Hospital was designed in the French style of the early 20th century. It has tiers of geometric design with a marble fountain in the center; it features three dolphins intertwined in its center. The garden is surrounded by large columns crowned by ceramic objects in the shape of vases, dogs and pine cones.

Five of the ceramic objects were imported from the Santo António do Vale da Piedade factory in Vila Nova de Gaia, Portugal. The marble sculptures in the fountain are probably from Lisbon, but no documentation attests to their origin.

The garden was abandoned in the 20th century and is in an advanced state of degradation. Its furniture has been stolen or lost. Traces of the garden beds, the fountain and the columns remain. The decorative ceramic elements remain, but are in poor condition.

== See also ==
- National Institute of Historic and Artistic Heritage (IPHAN)
- Cachoeira
- Bahia
- Colonial Brazil
- United Kingdom of Portugal, Brazil and the Algarves

== Bibliography ==
- Excerpts from this article are taken from website IPatrimônio, published under the Creative Commons Attribution (BY) v1.0 license.
