= Praça Dr. Aristides Mílton Fountain =

- Chafariz da Praça Dr. Aristides Mílton
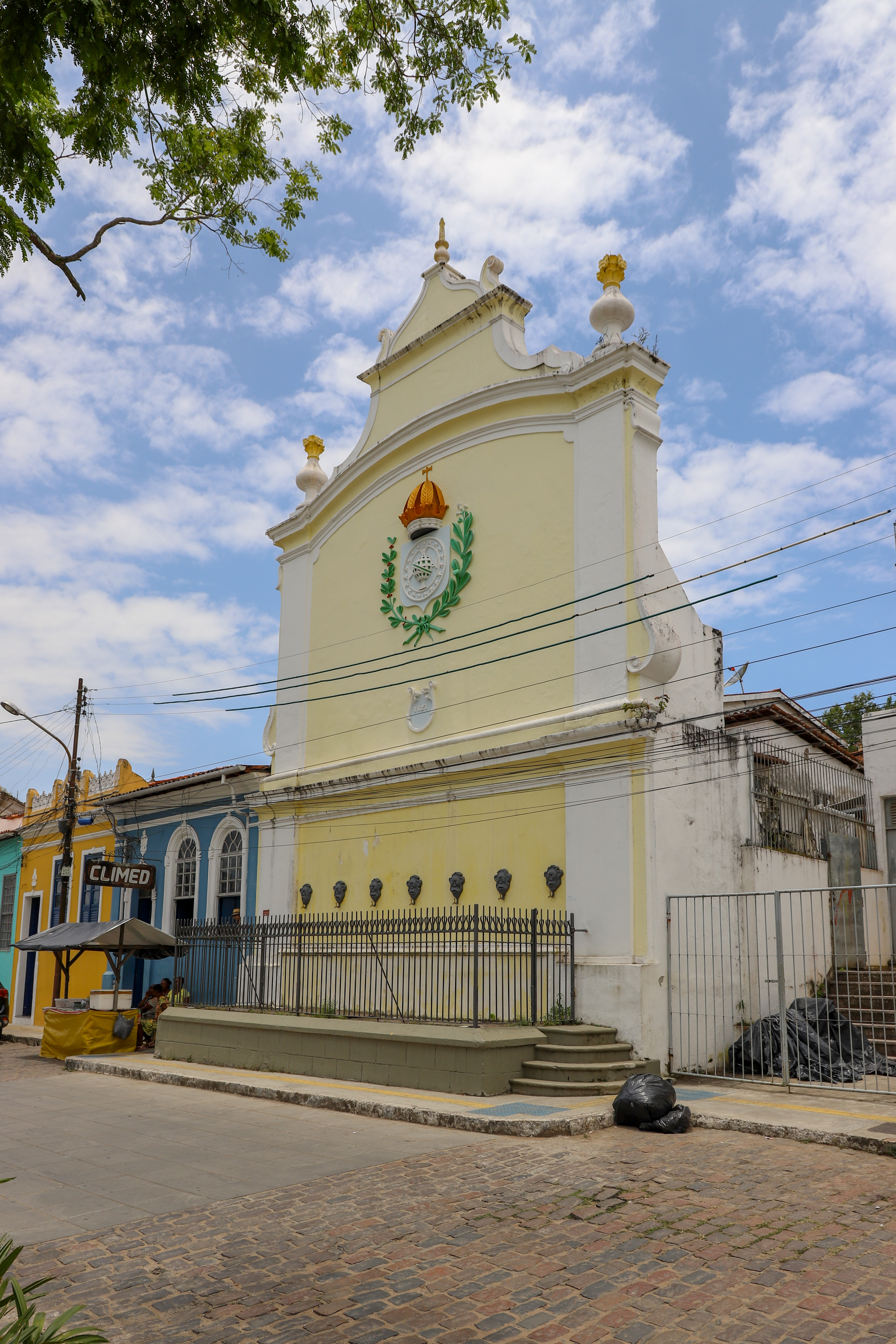
- Praça Dr. Aristides Mílton Fountain, Cachoeira, Bahia, Brazil

- Location within Brazil
- Former names: Chafariz Imperial

General information
- Type: public fountain
- Location: Praça Dr. Aristides Mílton, Cachoeira, Bahia, Brazil
- Coordinates: 12.6077°S 38.963°W
- Inaugurated: 1781

National Historic Heritage of Brazil
- Designated: 1939
- Reference no.: 199

The Praça Dr. Aristides Mílton Fountain (Portuguese: Chafariz da Praça Dr. Aristides Mílton) is an 18th-century public fountain in Cachoeira, Bahia, Brazil. The fountain is located at the north of Praça Dr. Aristides Mílton and sits between numerous historic homes of the 18th and 19th century. The Praça Dr. Aristides Mílton Fountain was built in 1781 and remodeled in 1827. It was built to transportation water from the forest owned by Tenente Felipe to the public square of the Hospital São João de Deus. The fountain provided water to troops as part of the Independence of Bahia, part of the larger independence movement in Brazil. It was listed as a historic structure by the National Institute of Historic and Artistic Heritage in 1939.

== Structure ==
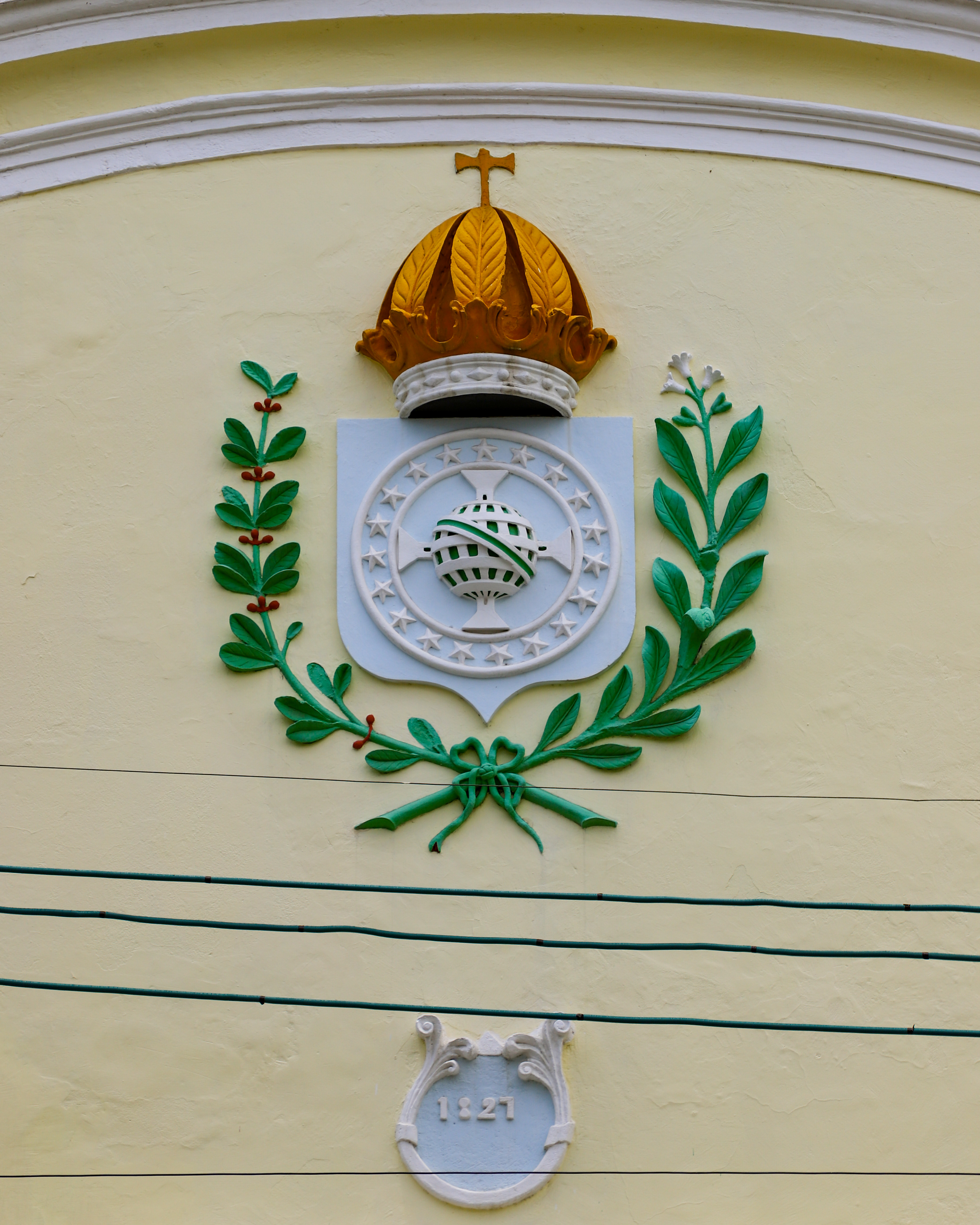
Coat of Arms of the Empire of Brazil

The Praça Dr. Aristides Mílton Fountain is built of mixed masonry of stone and brick. The Neoclassical elements of the structure were added in the early 19th century. The fountain is built in close alignment to the street with an atrium raised slightly above the ground level. The system consists of a collection box, spillway, aqueduct, decantation deposit, and seven spouts. The façade is flanked by cornices in masonry surmounted by torches, subdivided into two stages by a robust cornice.

== Protected status ==
The Praça Dr. Aristides Mílton Fountain was listed as a historic structure by the National Institute of Historic and Artistic Heritage in 1939 under inscription number 199. It is in close proximity to another federally protected structure, the House at Praça Dr. Aristides Milton 23-A, recognized for its role in the independence movement of Bahia and Brazil.
