= Church of Santo Antônio da Mouraria =

Catholic temple in Salvador, Bahia, Brazil

- Igreja de Santo Antônio da Mouraria
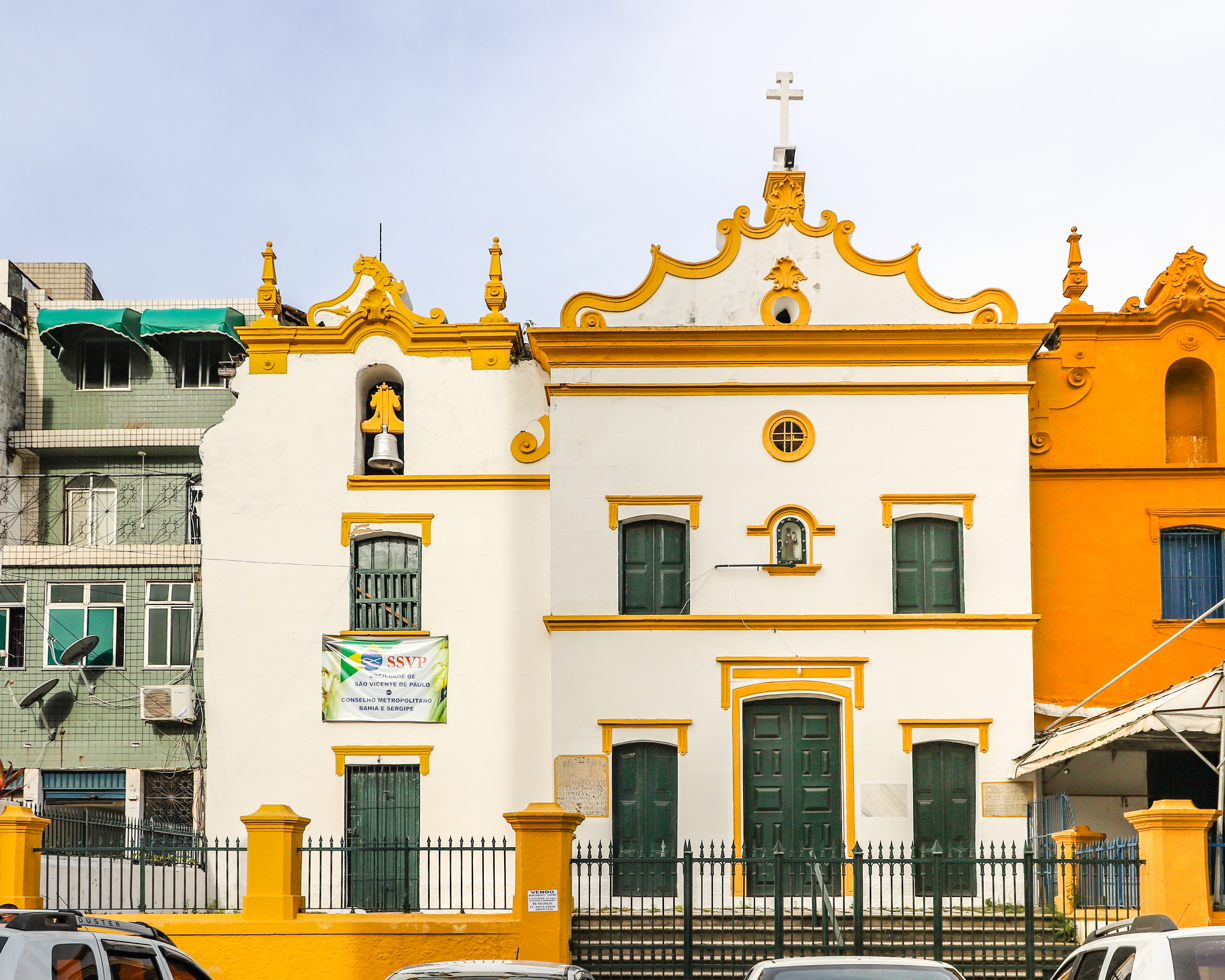

- Location within Brazil

Religion
- Affiliation: Catholic
- Rite: Roman

Location
- Location: Salvador, Bahia, Brazil
- Interactive map of Church of Santo Antônio da Mouraria
- Coordinates: 12°58′50.25″S 38°30′38.47″W

Architecture
- Completed: 1726

National Historic Heritage of Brazil
- Designated: 1938
- Reference no.: 122-T-1938

The Church of Santo Antônio da Mouraria is a Brazilian Catholic temple, built in 1724 in devotion to Saint Anthony. The church is in Salvador, Bahia. It is a national historical heritage site, listed by the National Institute of Historic and Artistic Heritage (IPHAN), on June 17, 1938, under the case nº 122-T-1938.

== History ==
Vasco Fernandes César de Meneses commanded the construction of a religious temple to meet the needs of the population and avoid conflicts with the Convent of Desterro. At the time, the population used the Convent Church for weddings and baptisms, which was unpleasant for the novices of the Convent because it disturbed their practices. And so, in this historical context, on October 29, 1724, the construction of the chapel began, which was built in the middle of the military area of the time and became known as the "Chapel of the military". Construction was completed on June 12, 1726.

The Brotherhood of the Third Order was created on January 18, 1727, to take care of the chapel. The Third Order was extinguished and on February 15, 1849, the Brotherhood of Saint Anthony of the Military began to administer the chapel. With the epidemics and the Paraguayan war, there were many casualties in the confrères of the brotherhood, which ended up being extinguished in 1879. In 1894, the administration was transferred to the São Vicente de Paulo Society, which had its headquarters in the chapel in November 1895.

From 1900 to 1905, the chapel underwent extensions and was transformed into a church.

== Architecture ==
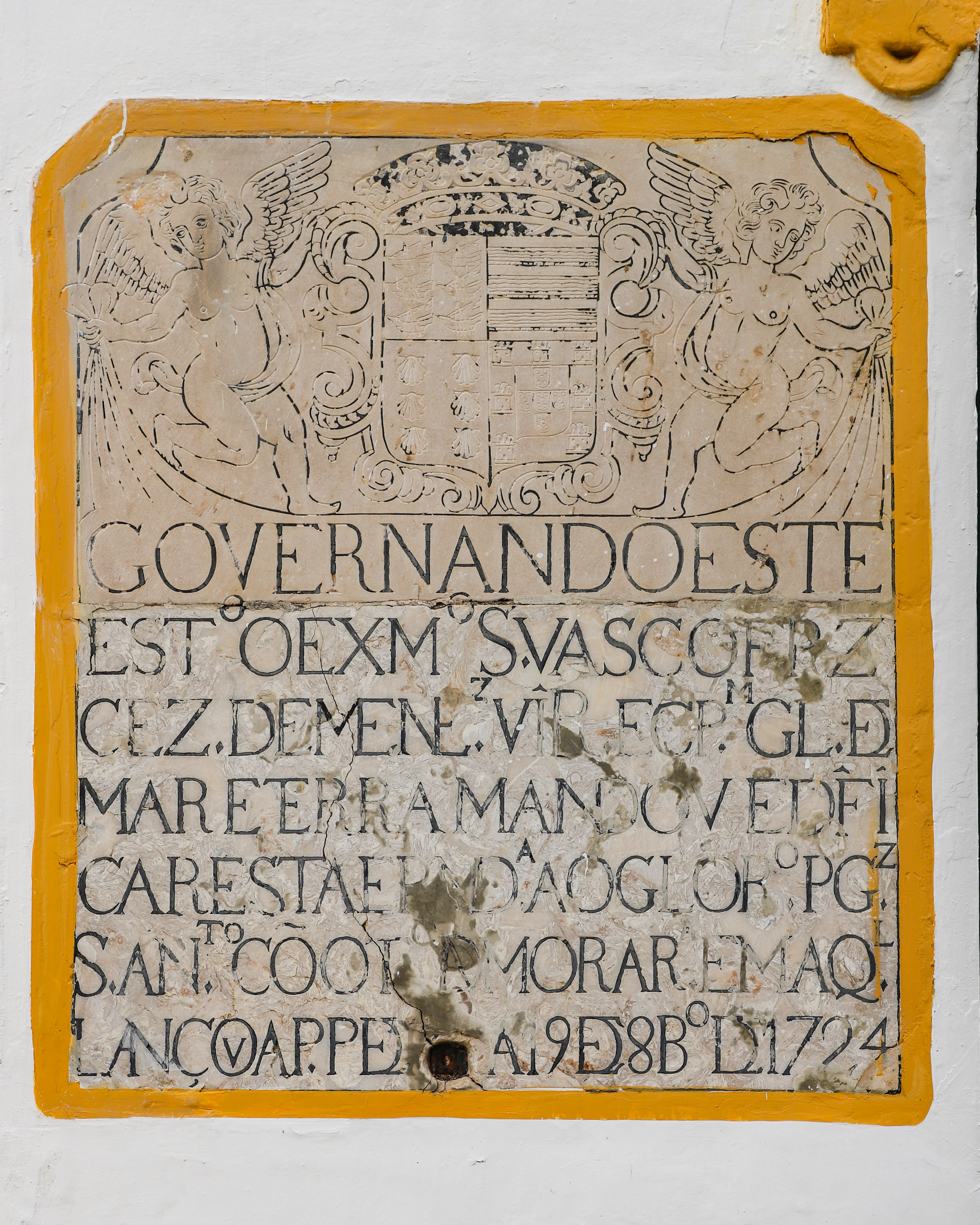
Celebration headstone for the laying of the foundation stone

The church has undergone many renovations and alterations to its building. The chapel was built with one floor, using stone and brick. It had the architecture of rural chapels of the time, with a single body, where the crossing arch divided the nave from the apse, sacristies on the sides and a bell tower. The façade has a main door with a window on each side, and also has an oculus and a niche with Saint Anthony. All the walls of the nave, up to a height of 1.90 meters, were covered with 18th-century Portuguese tiles depicting biblical scenes. Italian marble was used on the floor of the nave and churchyard. The holy water font, made of limestone, was attached to the internal artwork of the main façade.

From 1900 to 1905, two side altars were built in the nave, one for the Gospel of Saint Joseph and the other for Our Lady of the Rosary of Pompeii, and it received carved and cut wooden altarpieces inspired by the neoclassical style. The ceiling received an illusionist painting in Baroque style, 1.10 meters x 4.00 meters. The painting depicts St. Anthony receiving the infant Jesus from the Blessed Virgin. The windows that flanked the main door of the nave were transformed into a door and received high relief moldings as ornamentation. And a second body of the church was opened where the chaplain's dwelling used to be.

A second floor was added to the church from 1909 to 1926, which had access to the choir and rostrum, a large meeting room, the janitor's office and a room for the singers; an adjacent building was built to house the assistance work of the Vincentian Society and a skylight was opened in the chancel. The church's façade was also remodeled. Until 1926, the church still housed the diamond-shaped Way of the Cross, painted in sheet metal on wood, and the canvases of "The Death of the Righteous Man and the Death of the Sinner".

The church currently has four bells, with the oldest one dating from 1757 and the others having been acquired in 1885 and 1924.
