= House at Praça Dr. Aristides Milton 23-A =

House in Cachoeira, Bahia

- Casa à Rua Ana Nery, 4
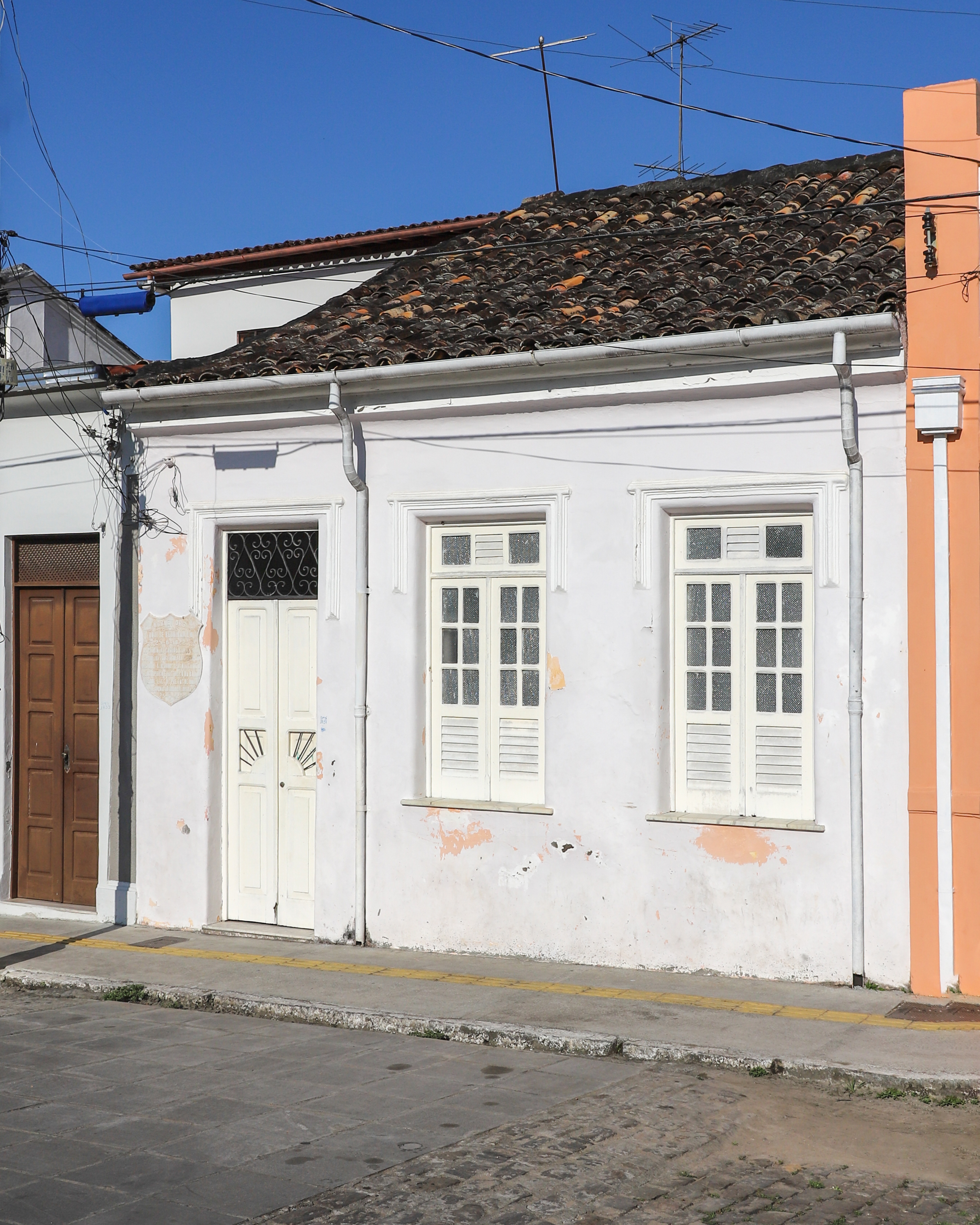
- House at Praça Dr. Aristides Milton 23-A, Cachoeira, Bahia

- Location within Brazil

General information
- Location: Praça Dr. Aristides Milton, 23-A, Cachoeira, Bahia, Brazil
- Coordinates: 12.603225470743398°S 38.9628957550546°W
- Estimated completion: 1800s

Technical details
- Floor count: 1
- Floor area: 151 square metres (1,630 ft^{2})

Design and construction
- Known for: Meeting place during the Independence of Bahia, 1822-1823

National Historic Heritage of Brazil
- Designated: 1941
- Reference no.: 200

House at Praça Dr. Aristides Milton 23-A (Portuguese: Casa à Praça Dr. Aristides Milton 23-A) is a single-family home in Cachoeira, Bahia, Brazil. It was constructed in the early 19th century, and was once part of a larger residence along Praça Dr. Aristides Milton, a broad public square. The house occupies only 151 square metres (1,630 ft^{2}), and once part of a larger residence. It is recognized for its role in the independence movement in Bahia and Brazil; the house served as a meeting point for independence figures in the early 19th century. A marble plaque to the left of the door commemorates the house's role in the Independence of Bahia. It was listed as a historic structure by the National Institute of Historic and Artistic Heritage in 1941. The House at No. 4 Rua Ana Nery is a private residence and may not be visited.

== History ==
The House at Praça Dr. Aristides Milton 23-A is noted for its role in the Independence of Bahia, and more broadly, the independence movement in Brazil. Cachoeira served as an ideal location for independence figures of the period: it was distant from Portuguese surveillance and troops in the state capital of Salvador, but secretly accessible via the Paraguaçu River. Cachoeira was able to maintain relatively free meeting places and an independent press. The House at Praça Dr. Aristides Milton 23-A is noted as one of the primary meeting places for intellectuals before and during the Independence of Bahia struggle between 1822 and 1823; the town eventually became the administrative seat of the Bahian provisional government.

== Location ==
The House at Praça Dr. Aristides Milton 23-A is located in a line of eight single-storey, single-family houses on Rua Durval Chagas along the west end of Praça Dr. Aristides Milton. The plaza was once the church yard of the chapel of the Miseriacorida Hospital. The baroque-style church with an ornate façade remains at the north of the square. The main post office of Cachoeira is located at the opposite end of the square, and was built in an Art Deco style in 1923. Small, single-family homes line the east of the square. The Praça Dr. Aristides Mílton Fountain (Portuguese: Chafariz da Praça Dr. Mílton), which dates to the 19th century, served as a primary fountain for residents in the city. It is located between the row of houses at the east of the square. Praça Dr. Aristides Milton is connected by Rua to the Praça da Aclamação. The House at Praça Dr. Aristides Milton 23-A lacked the prestige of the large sobrado town houses of the sugarcane plantation elites of the region built in the 17th and 18th center around the town hall of the city. Praça Dr. Aristides Milton, however, was connected to the historic city center by Rua Ana Neri and was an attractive location for the houses of merchants in the 19th century.

== Structure ==
The House at Praça Dr. Aristides Milton 23-A occupies only 151 square metres (1,630 ft^{2}), but was once part of a large residence. It is a narrow structure with the front rooms arranged along a hall; the rear rooms are arranged around a small veranda. The house has a low, simple tile gable roof. The rear of the structure opens to a lower, undeveloped area of vegetation. A single stairway from the veranda leads down to this area. The house has a simple façade with a door at the left, corresponding to the interior hall; and two windows at the right. The door and windows have straight lintels and frames from that date to the 20th century.

A marble plaque to the left of the door was placed by the Brazilian Institute of Geography and Statistics (IBGE) and has the inscription:

Urbi et orbi. Here, on June 25, 1822, the patriots from Cachoeira began consideration for national redemption: a hundred years later, the Geographical and Historical Institute of Bahia earns them the prize of an undying memory; 6/26/1922.^{A}

== Protected status ==
The House at Praça Dr. Aristides Milton 23-A was listed as a protected historic site by the National Institute of Historic and Artistic Heritage in 1941 under inscription number 200. It is additionally protected a component of the Historic Center of Cachoeira.

== Access ==
The house functions as a private residence and may not be visited.

== Footnote ==
A.The inscription Portuguese reads: "Urbi et orbi. Aqui se reuniram em 25/6/1822 os patriotas cachoeiranos para as primeiras cogitações da redempção nacional: cem anos após, o Instituto Geográfico e Histórico da Bahia rende-lhes os preitos de uma recordação imorredoura 26/6/1922."
