= Church of Our Lady of Victory =

Roman Catholic church in Bahia, Brazil

- Igreja de Nossa Senhora da Vitória
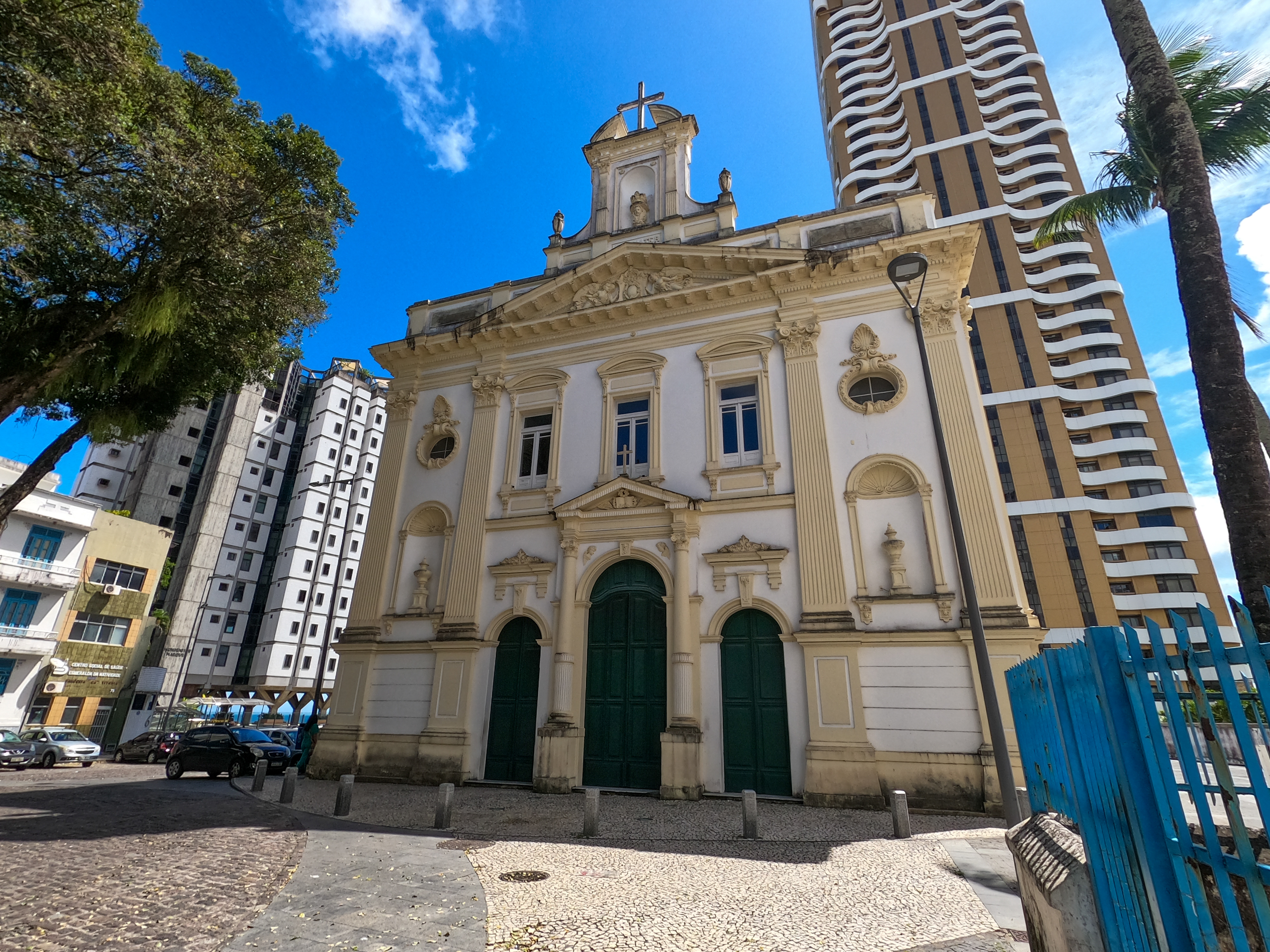

- Location of the Church of Our Lady of Victory in Brazil Church of Our Lady of Victory (South America)

Religion
- Affiliation: Catholic
- Rite: Roman
- Ownership: Roman Catholic Archdiocese of São Salvador da Bahia

Location
- Municipality: Salvador
- State: Bahia
- Country: Brazil
- Coordinates: 12.996196°S 38.527956°W

Architecture
- Style: Baroque
- Established: 1561
- Direction of façade: North

National Historic Heritage of Brazil
- Designated: 1938
- Reference no.: 122

National Historic Heritage of Brazil
- Designated: 2005
- Reference no.: 1528

The Church of Our Lady of Victory (Portuguese: Igreja de Nossa Senhora da Vitória) is a 16th-century Roman Catholic church in Salvador, Bahia, Brazil. The church is dedicated to Our Lady of Victory and belongs to the Roman Catholic Archdiocese of São Salvador da Bahia. The church was built in approximately 1561 by the Portuguese, and is the second-oldest church in Brazil. The church was listed as a historic structure by the National Historic and Artistic Heritage Institute in 2005. It has a large collection of 18th-century Baroque images on the high altar. The façade of the church faced west to the Bay of All Saints until 1808. The church building was reoriented east in 1808, possibly in conjunction with the visit of John VI of Portugal to Bahia. The façade of the church was again greatly modified in 1910 to the present Neoclassical design; it is white with a Roman triangular pediment and elaborate decoration. A large-scale renovation of the church was carried out between 2014 and 2015. The work included improvements to the frescoes, secular paintings, the painting of the nave ceiling, the font, various sacred art objects, the high altar, and tombstones.

== History ==
The first record of the existence of the Church of Our Lady of Victory is via tombstone, which records the first marriage of Portuguese colonists in Bahia. Definitive record of the church structure dates to 1561 in a location outside of the city of Salvador, which consisted solely of a small area around the present-day Historic Center of the city. The church building was constructed facing west towards the Bay of All Saints.

The church was possibly fully rebuilt in 1808, at the time Dom João VI visited Bahia; the façade, formerly facing the bay, was reoriented to the opposite direction to the east. The interior of the church is decorated in the Neoclassical style typical of 19th-century churches in Brazil; its chancel features low walls of lioz limestone and multi-chromatic azulejos, both imported from Portal.

== Protected status ==
The tomb inscriptions of the Church of Our Lady of Victory were listed as protected historic property (bem móvel ou integrado) in 1938 under inscription number 122. The church, both the structure and its contents, was listed as a historic structure by the National Institute of Historic and Artistic Heritage in 2005 under inscription number 1528.

== Access ==
The Church of Our Lady of Victory is open to the public and may be visited.
