= Church and Convent of the Third Order of Our Lady of Carmo =

Church in Paraíba, Brazil

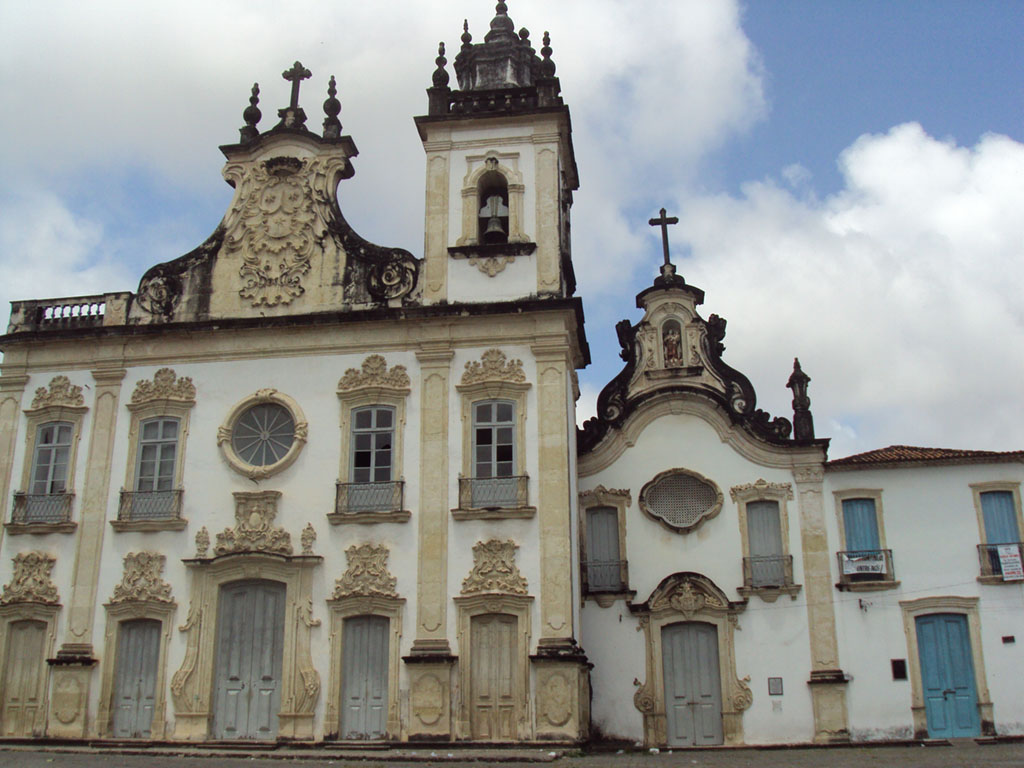

- Location of the Church and convent of the Third Order of Our Lady of Carmo in Brazil

Religion
- Affiliation: Catholic
- Sect: Carmelites
- Rite: Roman
- Ownership: Archdiocese of Paraíba

Location
- Municipality: João Pessoa
- State: Paraíba
- Country: Brazil
- Interactive map of Church and Convent of the Third Order of Our Lady of Carmo
- Coordinates: 07°05′00″S 34°50′00″W

Architecture
- Style: Baroque architecture and Rococo
- Founder: D. Henriques
- Funded by: Friar Manuel de Santa Teresa
- Completed: 1591-1777

National Historic Heritage of Brazil
- Designated: 1938
- Reference no.: 190

The Church and Convent of the Third Order of Our Lady of Carmo is located in the Brazilian state capital of João Pessoa. Situated in the Historic Center of João Pessoa, in Dom Adauto Square, comprises an architectural complex, built by the Carmelites, composed of the Church of Our Lady of Carmo, the Episcopal Palace (former Carmelite Convent and current headquarters of the Archdiocese of Paraíba), both built in the century (Iphaep), and the Church of Santa Teresa de Jesus of the Terceira do Carmo Order, dating from the 18th century and registered by the Institute of National Historical and Artistic Heritage (Iphan).

The architecture and sculpture of the work of the church is all in stone, and the façade and interior of the church are worked in rococo. The church and the chapel form a beautiful set, whose style is the Baroque. This set is located in the Plaza Dom Adauto, known as Praça do Bispo.

== History ==
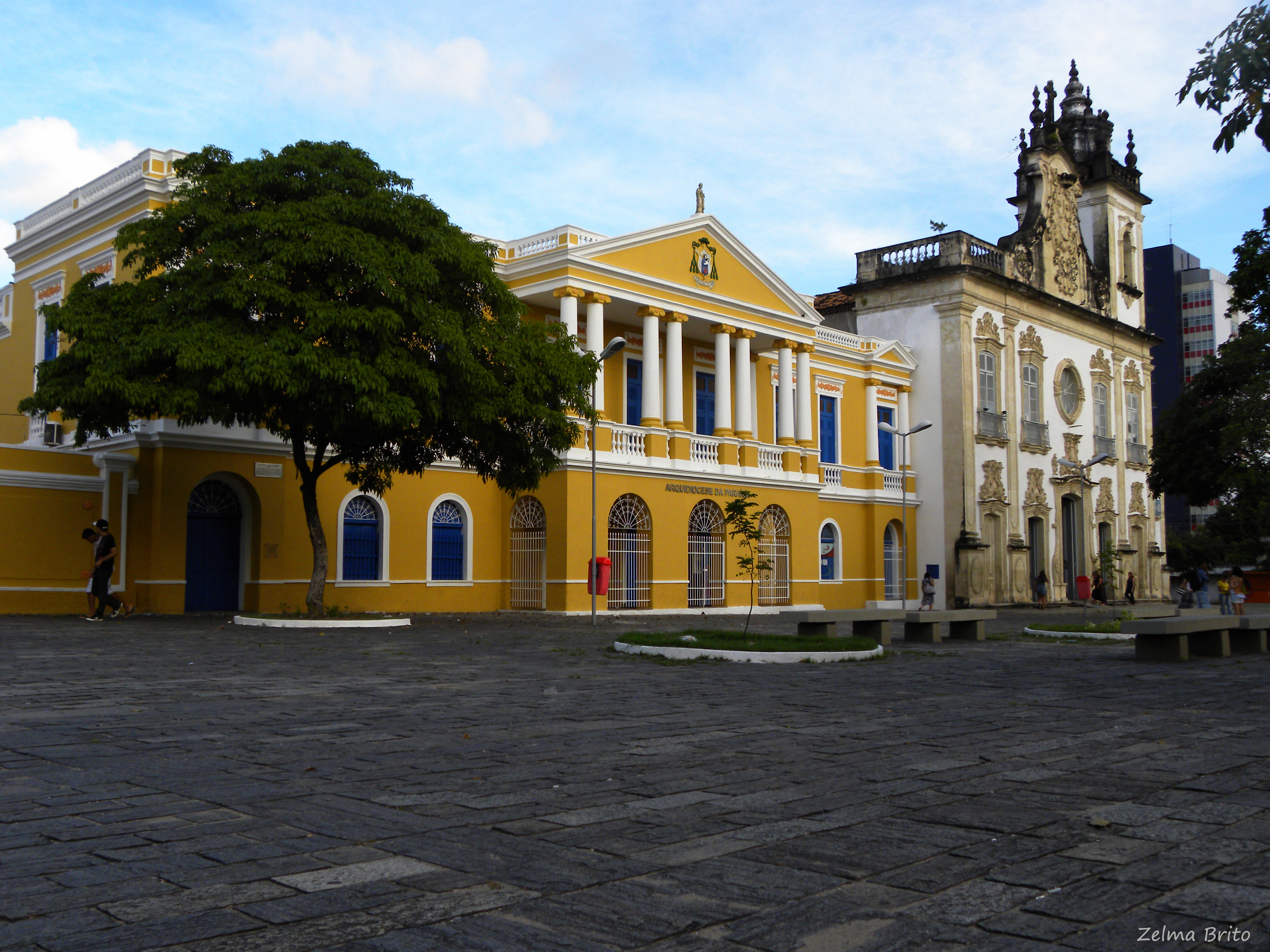
Former Carmelite convent and current headquarters of the Archdiocese of Paraíba, and the right Church of Our Lady of Carmo

The religious order of the Carmelites arrived in the State of Paraíba probably in 1591, together with the Benedictines, Franciscans and Jesuits, with the aim of evangelizing and catechizing the Indians. At the end of the sixteenth century the Carmelites began to build a house of their own in Paraíba. The completion of the work was delayed, including the Carmo Convent, the church of Nossa Senhora do Carmo, the chapel of Santa Teresa and the home of the exercises of the Third Brothers.

The Carmelite whole was only ready in the 18th century when, according to historical records, Friar Manuel de Santa Teresa closed the works using his own resources.

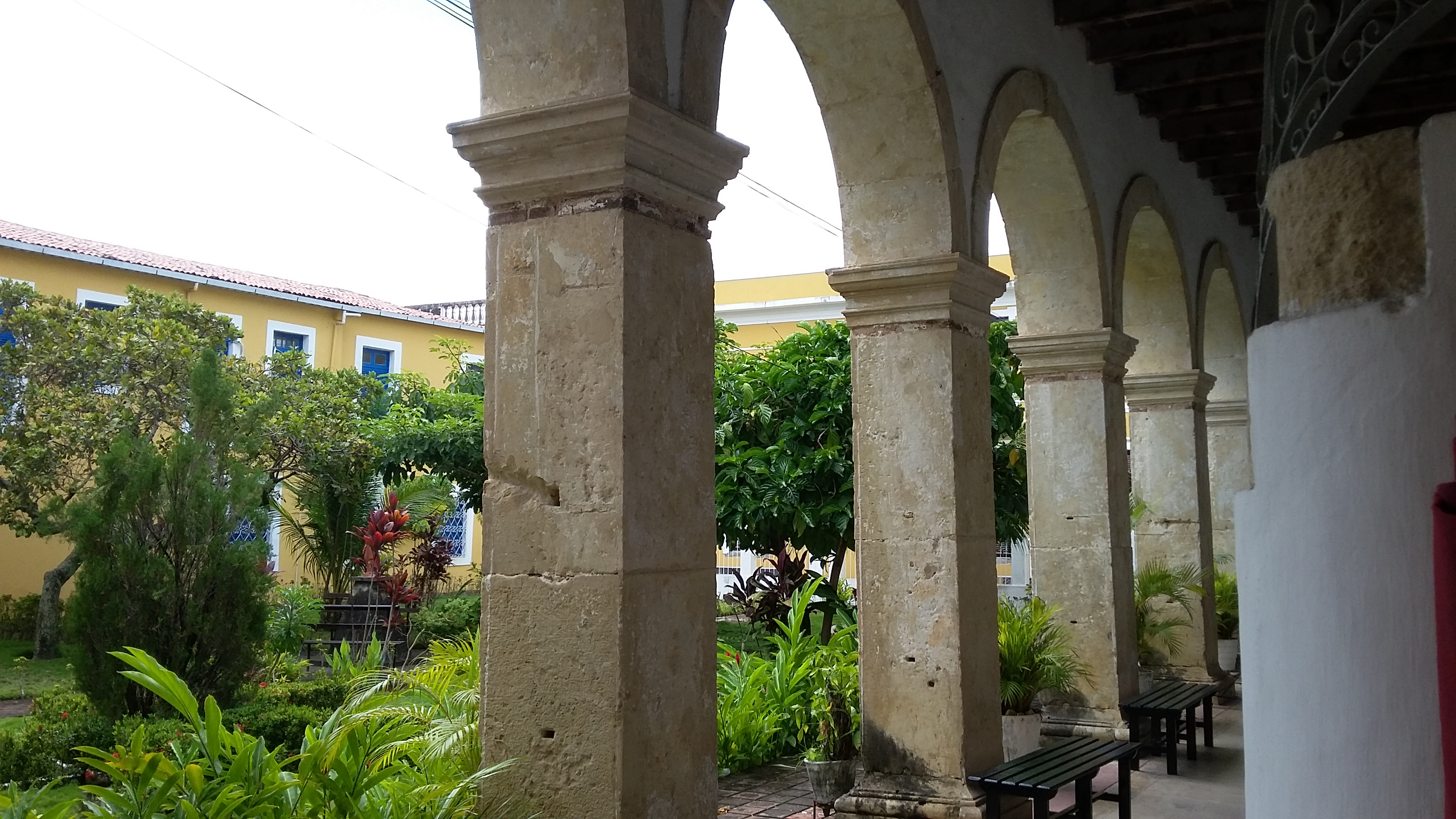
Garden of the Church of Our Lady of Carmo

recognized and registered in the National Artistic Historical Heritage Institute (IPHAN) since July 22, 1938, the church enchants people and visitors from various places for the singularity present in every detail. The well-executed chancel carvings and almost all covered with gold, the helix columns with stylized leaves of acanthus obey the style of the main church of the Carmelite Order and the ceiling lining in ogival vault, telling episodes of the life and death of the great reformer do Carmo are the main highlights.

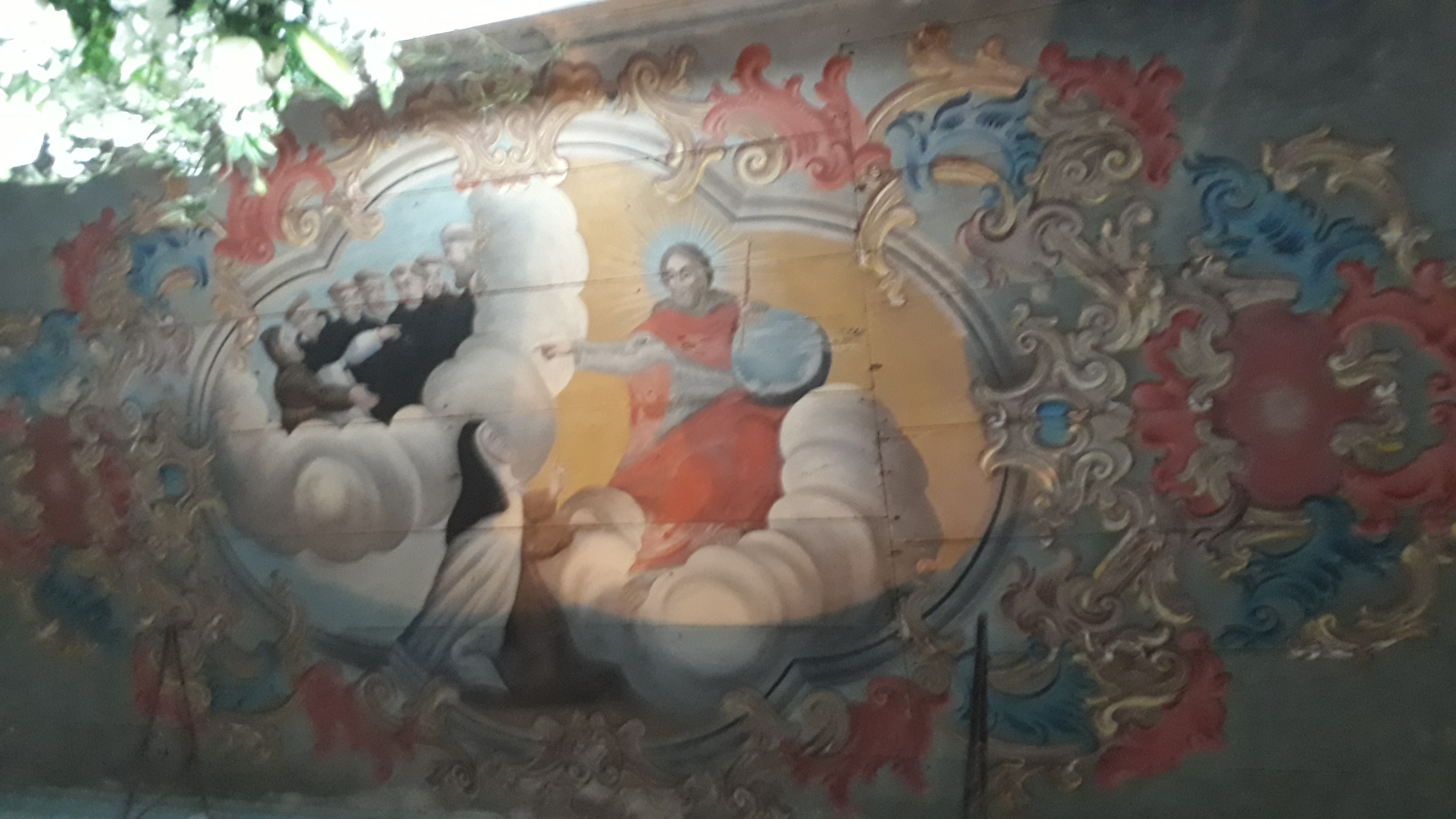
Historical painting of the ceiling of the chapel of Santa Teresa de Jesus of the Terceira do Carmo Order, João Pessoa

In the center opens a gigantic rose of golden petals, from where they emerge diverse rays that are divided in triangles, in the middle of which they emphasize busts of saints of the order embedded in the wood. The sacristy has a jacaranda chest of drawers with an open alcove flanked by ornate furniture, two side cabinets divided into bins with portinhoas (of great artistic value) and carved stone sink, installed in a special compartment.

It is used for Catholic religious worship and is the place of operation of the Third Order of the Carmelites.

== Chapel of St. Teresa of Jesus ==
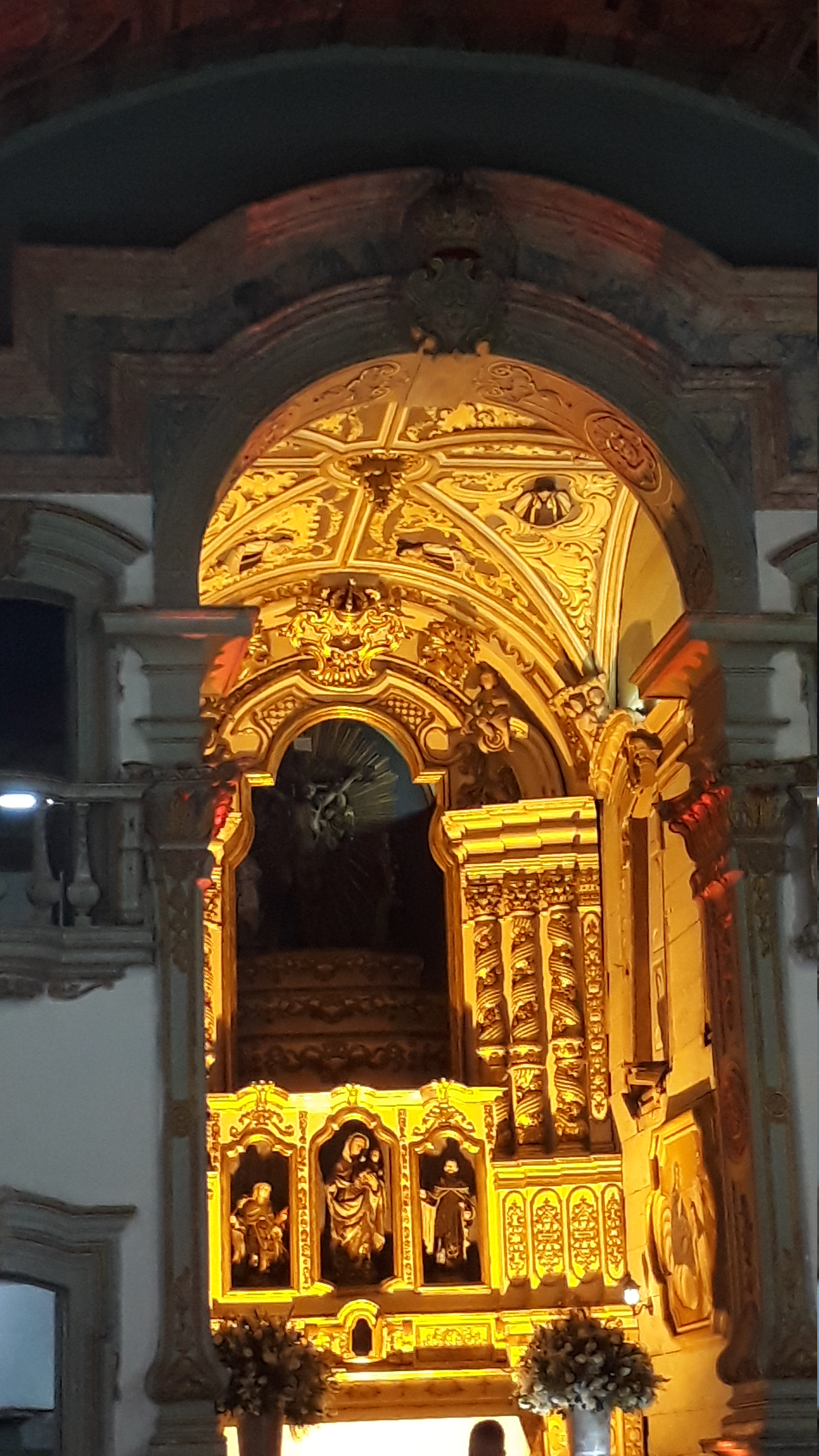
Golden Chapel of the Church of Santa Teresa de Jesus of the Terceira do Carmo Order

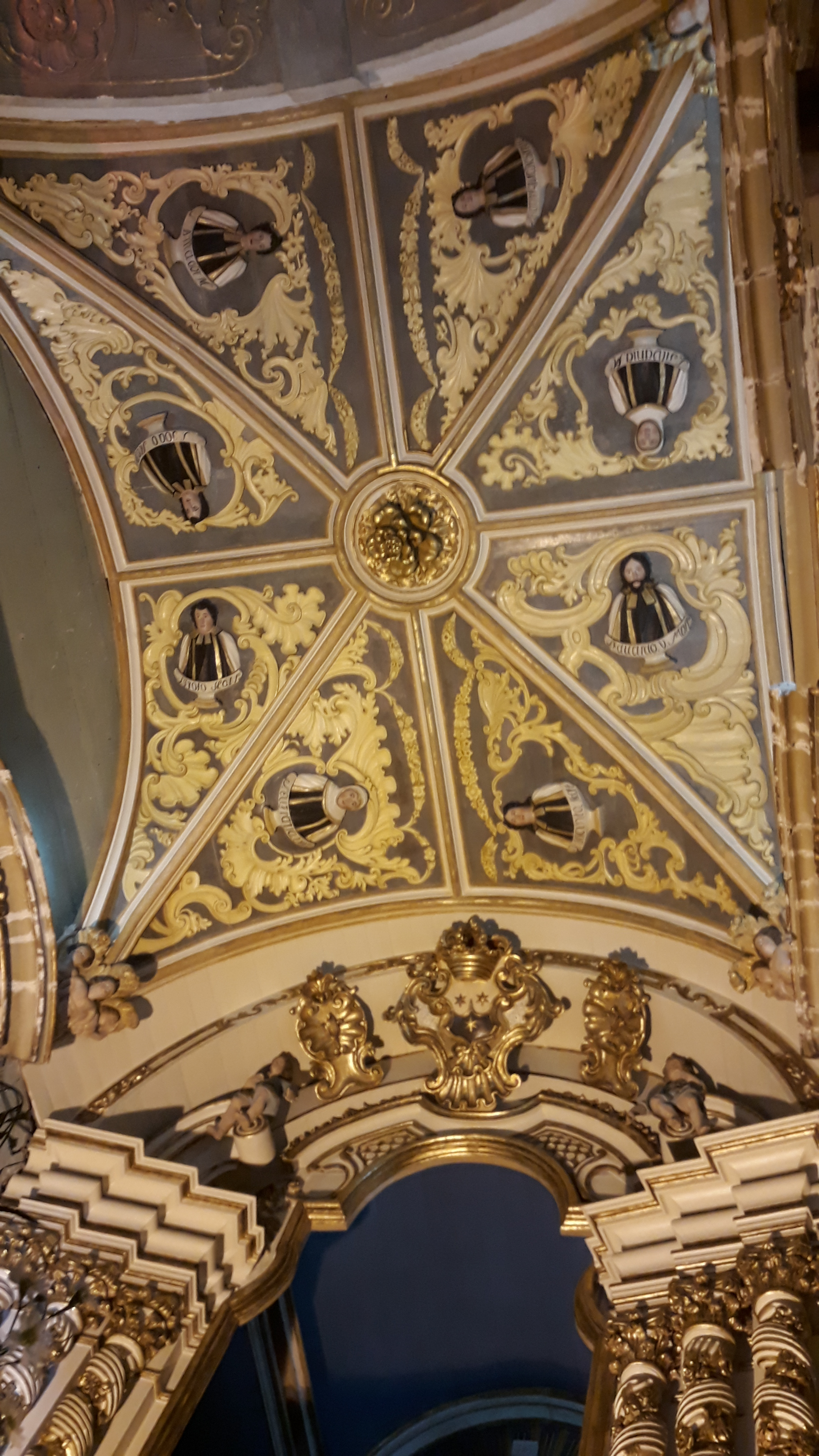
Ceiling of the Altar-Mor of the Chapel of the Church of Santa Teresa de Jesus of the Terceira do Carmo Order

The church of Santa Teresa is attached to the Church of Our Lady. do Carmo, differing from this by having smaller proportions and richness of details. It presents a peculiarity as to its plan, which is different from the others of the orders: the four corners of the nave are bevelled, which gives it the octagonal shape. The carvings of the chancel are well executed and almost all covered with gold. The helix columns with stylized acanthus leaves conform to the style of the main church of the Carmelite Order. The ceiling lining is in ogival vault, counting episodes of the life and death of the great reformer of Carmo. In the center opens a gigantic rose of golden petals, from where they emerge diverse rays that are divided in triangles, in the middle of which they emphasize busts of saints of the order embedded in the wood.

The sacristy has jacaranda dresser with open niche tilted with ornate; two side cabinets divided into escanihos with portinhoas (of great artistic value) and carved stone sink, installed in a special compartment.
