= Church of the Old Seminary in Belém da Cachoeira =

Church in Cachoeira, Bahia, Brazil

Church of the Seminary of Belém
- Igreja do Antigo Seminário de Belém de Cachoeira
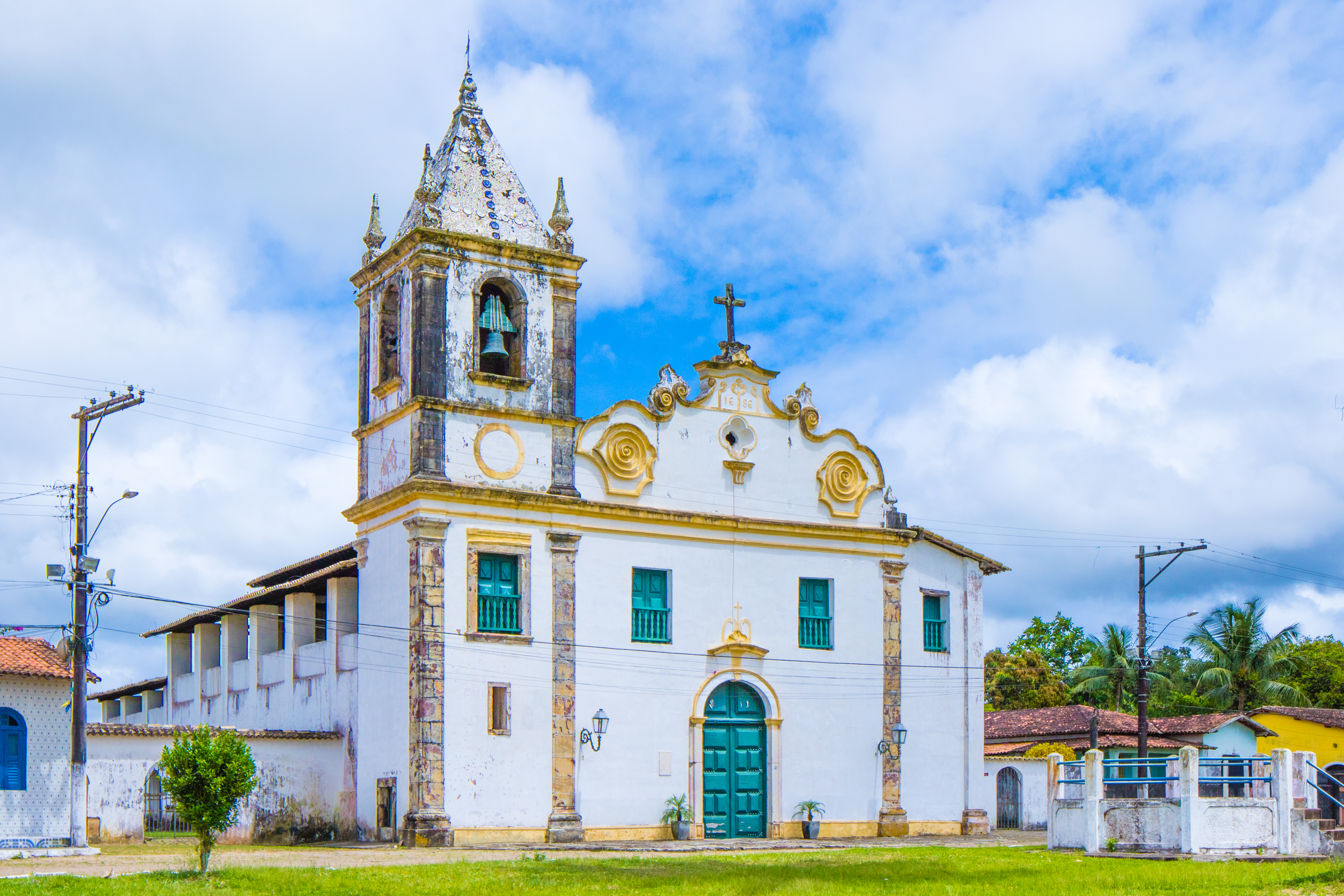
- Church of the Seminary of Belém, Cachoeira, Bahia, Brazil

- Location of the Church of the Seminary of Belém in Brazil

Religion
- Affiliation: Catholic
- Rite: Roman
- Ownership: Roman Catholic Archdiocese of São Salvador da Bahia

Location
- Municipality: Cachoeira
- State: Bahia
- Country: Brazil
- Interactive map of Church of the Seminary of Belém
- Coordinates: 12.55458°S 38.94236°W

Architecture
- Style: Baroque

National Historic Heritage of Brazil
- Designated: 1938
- Reference no.: 122

The Church of the Seminary of Belém (Portuguese: Igreja do Antigo Seminário de Belém de Cachoeira) is a church and former school in Cachoeira, Bahia, Brazil. The seminary was founded in 1686 by the Jesuits and was the order's first school in Brazil outside of the city of Salvador. The seminary eventually was home to eight priests and between 100 and 140 students. The Jesuits held an equal number of slaves of African origin at the seminary. The seminary complex fell into ruins after the expulsion of the Jesuits from Brazil in 1759. The church is the only remaining structure of the seminary and is dedicated to Our Lady of Bethlehem. It retains many elements of both 17th-century Portuguese colonial church architecture. The Church of the Seminary of Belém was listed as a historic structure by the National Historic and Artistic Heritage Institute in 2005.

== History ==
The Church of the Seminary of Belém was the largest Jesuit establishment in the Recôncavo region. It was founded in 1686 by Father Alexandre de Gusmão, a Portuguese Jesuit educator. The seminary was built on land donated by João Rodrigues Adorno, son of Gaspar Rodrigues Adorno, the founder of Cachoeira, 7 kilometres (4.3 mi) north of Adorno's sugar cane plantation and small town.

Gusmão founded the church to educate the sons of Portuguese settlers in the Recôncavo; students of mixed, African, and Indian descent were excluded from the seminary. Additionally, the seminary only allowed students from the Recôncavo region and the hinterland of the Bahia; students from Salvador were also excluded from the school, having their own school in the city. The family of Aragão de Menezes donated land for the establishment, which was located near an Indian village. The church was built at the same time. Students in the seminary were between twelve and nineteen years old and unlike students in Salvador, and exclusively lived at the seminary and paid tuition. In contrast, students at the Jesuit seminary in Salvador remained with their family and attended without paying tuition. The church, which originally sat in the middle of the seminary complex, was completed in 1701. Father Gusmão died in 1709 at the seminary. After the expulsion of the Jesuits from Brazil in 1759 the complex fell into ruin.

== Location ==
The Church of the Seminary of Belém is located in the middle of the larger side of a large-scale lawn. The region is flat and relatively high, with very mild climate. According to an inventory of 1760 carried out after the expulsion of the Jesuits, the entire estate consisted of a large seminary residence, the church, slave quarters, and a well that supplied fresh water. These were surrounded by a moat that served as a protective barrier.

The church is the only structure that remains from the original architectural complex; the slave residences, or senzala, were of adobe construction. These degraded over time and were demolished. The space today, dominated by the church structure, is surrounded today by small houses that replaced the senzalas. The church and its surrounding residences are now known as the Povoação de Belém de Cachoeira.

== Structure ==
The Church of the Seminary of Belém consists of single nave and cross sacristy, flanked by lateral corridors, superposed by galleries and tribunes. The nave and main chapel of the church are completely surrounded by a "magnificent" raised balcony; its design may have been influenced by the Church of Saint Thomas, in Thumpoly, Kerala, India, constructed by the Jesuits in 1600.

== Façade ==
The current façade, with rococo pediment and four choir windows, dates to the end of the 19th century. The façade is divided into three parts by pilasters. The church has a single portal with four full-sized windows at the choir level.

=== Belltower ===
The pyramidal belltower to the left of the facade is tiled in the 17th-century embrechado style, using Chinese porcelain, tiles, and plates as roofing materials and ornamentation. The crockery is from Macao and brought to the Recôncavo via trade routes of the Portuguese. The use of embrechado on the roof of the steeple of a church is also common to other churches in the Salvador and the Bahian Recôncavo, including Church and Convent of Saint Antony and Chapel of the Third Order in São Francisco do Conde; the Church of Santo Antônio in Cairu, and the Church of the Mount, also in Cachoeira.

=== Interior ===
The Church of the Seminary of Belém is noted for its rich Chinese-influenced ceiling paintings by Charles de Belleville (1657-1730), a Jesuit painter, sculptor, and carpenter. De Belleville, a French Jesuit, worked in the Chinese imperial court for nine years. He became sick during his return to Europe in 1707 and was left in Salvador, Bahia. He remained in Brazil throughout the early 18th century, specifically in Cachoeira, until his death in Salvador. He completed numerous works of art in the Chinese style. The paintings of the ceiling of the sacristy of the Church of Belém de Cachoeira are the only works directly attributed to De Belleville. It has a background in black with stylized passionflower (Passiflora edulis, native to Brazil), lilacs, and peonies, all in bright pink and white. The borders and center of the panels are in a Chinese gold decorative motif; the overall effect imitates Chinese lacquer work. It is described as "the most authentically Asian-style artwork made in South America" by Gauvin Bailey.

The Church of the Seminary of Belém once had a rich collection of images and altar in marble with incrustations. It was relocated and is on view at the Parish Church of Our Lady of the Rosary in Cachoeira.

== Protected status ==
The Church of the Seminary of Belém was listed as a historic structure by the National Institute of Historic and Artistic Heritage in 1938 under inscription number 122.

== Access ==
Belém is 7 kilometres (4.3 mi) from the city of Cachoeira and lies along a road that connects the town to BA-101. The church is open to the public and may be visited.
