= List of National Historic Heritage sites of Brazil =

The National Historic Heritage of Brazil are buildings, monuments, structures, objects and sites deemed of historic or cultural importance to the country. The register is maintained by the National Institute of Historic and Artistic Heritage of Brazil. This designation insures protection under federal law. The following is a list of National Historic Heritage sites by state:

== List of National Historic Heritage of Brazil ==
=== Alagoas ===
Marechal Deodoro
Image	Heritage name	Year of inclusion
	Architectural and urban site of Marechal Deodoro	2009
	São Francisco Church and Convent	1964
	House of Marshal Deodoro da Fonseca	1964
Palmeira dos Índios
Image	Heritage name	Year of inclusion
	House of Graciliano Ramos	1965
Penedo
Image	Heritage name	Year of inclusion
	Architectural and urban site of Penedo	1996
	Church of Our Lady of the Chains	1964
	Church of São Gonçalo Garcia	1964
	Maria dos Anjos Convent and Church	1941
Piranhas
Image	Heritage name	Year of inclusion
	Architectural and urban site of Piranhas	2006
Porto Calvo
Image	Heritage name	Year of inclusion
	Remainders of Colonial Village, particularly the Main Church of Our Lady of Presentation	1955
União dos Palmares
Image	Heritage name	Year of inclusion
	Serra da Barriga	1986

=== Amapá ===
Macapá
Image	Heritage name	Year of inclusion
	Fort of São José	1950

=== Amazonas ===
Manaus
Image	Heritage name	Year of inclusion
	Mocó Reservoir	1985
	Mercado Adolpho Lisboa	1987
	Architectural site of the Port of Manaus	1987
	Amazon Theatre	1966

=== Bahia ===
Andaraí
Image	Heritage name	Year of inclusion
	Architectural and urban site of Igatu	2000
Cachoeira
Image	Heritage name	Year of inclusion
	Our Lady of Perpetual Help Chapel	1939
	Engenho Velho Chapel	1943
	Chapel of the São João de Deus Hospital	1943
	House at Benjamin Constant, 1	1943
	House at Benjamin Constant, 2	1943
	House at Benjamin Constant, 17	1943
	House of Prayer of the Third Order of Our Lady of Mount Carmel	1938
	Building at Ana Nery, 1, known as Solar Estrela	1941
	Building at Ana Nery, 2	1943
	House at Ana Nery, 4	1943
	Building at Ana Nery, 7, former home of Ana Nery	1941
	Building at Ana Nery, 25	1943
	Praça Dr. Aristides Mílton Fountain	1939
	Architectural and urban site of Cachoeira	1971
	Carmel Convent	1938
	Church of the Third Order of Our Lady of Mount Carmel	1938
	Church and Convent of Our Lady of Mount Carmel	1938
	Church of the Old Seminary in Belém da Cachoeira	1938
	Church of Santiago of Iguape	1960
	Convent and Church of Saint Antony	1941
	Church of Our Lady of the Rosary	1939
	Gardens of the São João de Deus Hospital	1940
	Municipal building	1939
	Engenho Vitória	1943
	Engenho Embiara	1943
	Building at Praça da Aclamação, 4	1941
	Building at 13 de Maio, 13	1943
	House at Praça Dr. Aristides Milton 23-A	1941
	Building at Sete de Setembro, 34	1941

==== Cairu ====
- Morro de São Paulo Fountain
- Morro de São Paulo Fort
- Saint Anthony Church and Convent

==== Candeias ====
- Engenho Freguesia
- Engenho Matoim

==== Castro Alves ====
- Saint Joseph of Genipapo Chapel

==== Ilhéus ====
- Our Lady of Santana Chapel

==== Itaparica ====
- Architectural and urban site of the Church of the Holy Sacrament
- Saint Lawrence Fort
- Saint Lawrence Church

==== Ituaçu ====
- Mangabeira Grotto

==== Jacobina ====
- Bom Jesus da Glória Chapel
- Our Lady of the Immaculate Conception Church

==== Jaguaripe ====
- Building at Rua da Ajuda, 1
- Municipal Palace
- Main Church of Our Lady of Help

==== Lauro de Freitas ====
- Parish of Santo Amaro Ipitanga

==== Lençóis ====
- Architectural and landscape site of Lençóis

==== Maragogipe ====
- São Roque farm's house and chapel
- Municipal Palace
- Santa Cruz of Paraguassu Fort
- Main Church of São Bartolomeu

==== Mata de São João ====
- Garcia d'Ávila's Castle

==== Monte Santo ====
- Architectural, urban, natural and landscape site of Serra do Monte Santo

==== Mucugê ====
- Architectural and landscape site of Mucugê

==== Nazaré ====
- House at Travessa da Capela, 2, known as Solar Ataíde

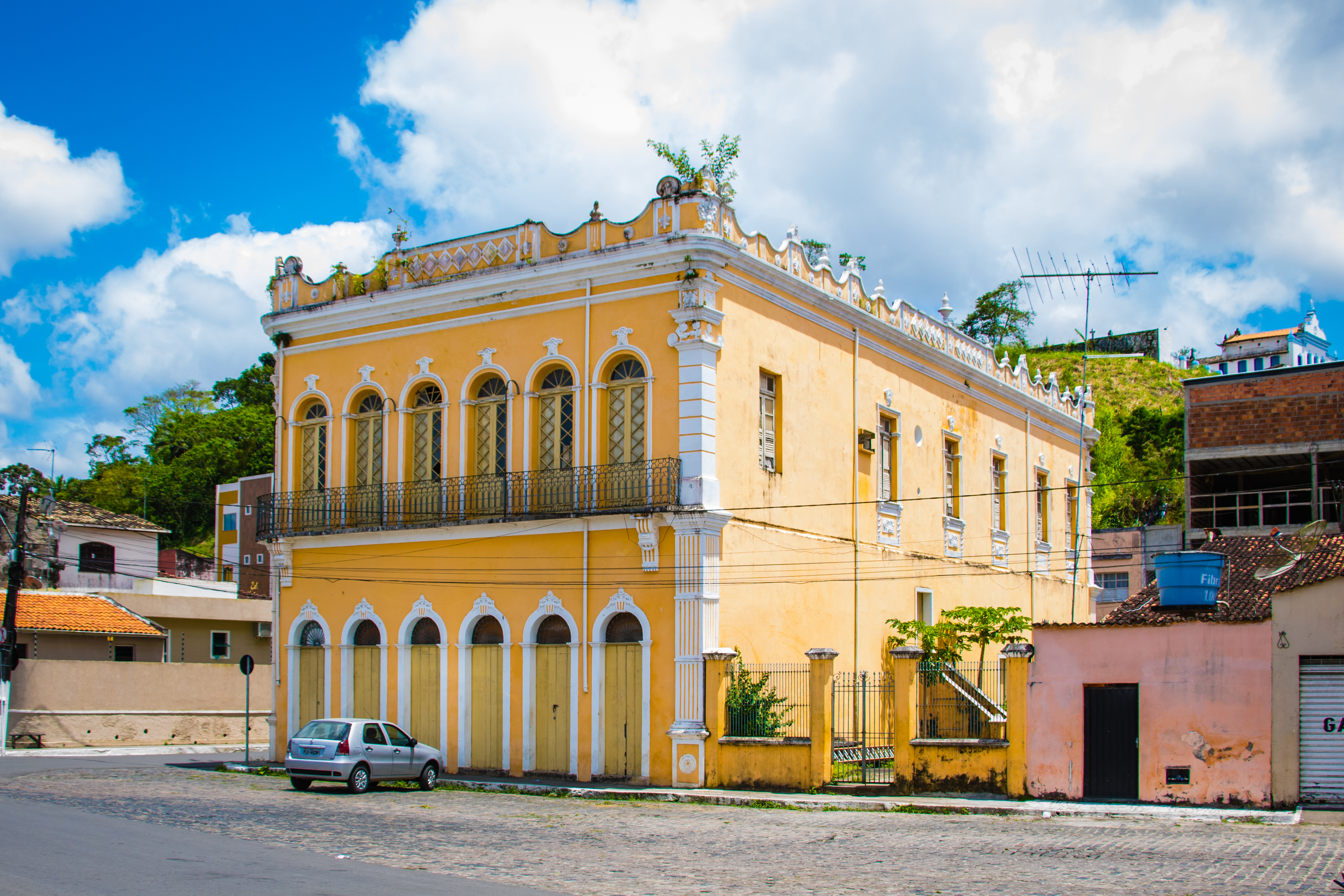
The Solar Ataíde building

- Our Lady of Conception Church
- Lady of Nazaré of Camamu Church
- Our Lady of Nazaré Main Church

==== Palmeiras ====
- Landscape site of Pai Inácio hill

==== Porto Seguro ====
- Architectural and landscape site of Cidade Alta de Porto Seguro
- Architectural and landscape site of Porto Seguro

==== Rio de Contas ====
- City Council and Jail
- House at Barão de Macaúbas, 11
- House of the Baron of Macaúbas
- Architectural site of Rio de Contas
- Holy Sacrament Main Church, including:
  - Two torches
  - Another two, smaller torches
  - A processional cross
  - Six pallium staffs
  - Two thuribles
  - A big, golden monstrance
  - A small, silver monstrance
- Church of Sant'Ana ruins

==== Salvador ====
- Church of Nosso Senhor do Bonfim, Salvador
- Church of Santo Antônio da Mouraria
- Chapel of Help
- Chapel of Our Lady of the Stairs
- Chapel of the Holy Body
- Chapel and Monastery of Monte Serrat
- Chapel of Our Lady of Sorrows and Gathering of the Good Jesus of Forgiveness
- House at Frederico Pontes Avenue
- House at Joana Angélica Avenue, 149
- Architectural elements of house at Sete de Setembro Avenue, 59, including:
  - Ground floor:
    - Noble stone carved door cover, with its respective nail finish and further component parts
    - Two wooden doors, on the inside of the hall, both with iron flags, and one with wooden lintel and jamb
  - First floor:
    - Grid room divider, in cropped wood, acting as a seal to the bulging arch between the superior hall and an internal room
    - Main hall door
    - Hall cupboard door
  - Second floor:
    - Four doors, with their respective lintels and jambs, one of which sports a door lock mirror
    - Two windows, with wickets, in the dining room
- House at Baixa do Bonfim, 236
- House at Carlos Gomes, 57
- House at Inácio Alcioly, 4
- House of the Seven Lamps
- House of Castro Alves
- House at 28 de Setembro, 8
- Casa Pia and College of the Orphans of Saint Joachim
- Tiles from Federal University of Bahia's rectory
- Architectural, urban and landscape site of Ana Nery square
- Architectural, urban and landscape site of Severino Vieira square
- Architectural, urban and landscape site of the hill of Saint Antônio of Barra
- Architectural, urban and landscape site of parts of the subdistrict of Penha, including:
  - Euzébio de Matos square
  - Slope of Bonfim
  - Teodósio Rodrigues de Faria square
  - Senhor do Bonfim square
  - Professor Santos Reis street
  - Stretch of Beira Mar avenue
  - Divina square
  - Benjamin Constant street
  - Teodósio Costa street, until aforementioned Senhor do Bonfim square
- Architectural, urban and landscape site of parts of the subdistrict of Conceição da Praia, including:
  - Marcílio Dias square
  - Manoel Vitorino street
  - Stretch of Visconde de Mauá street
  - Dionísio Martins street
  - Stretch of Sodré street
  - Macedo Costa street
- Architectural, urban and landscape site of public places on the perimeter of the subdistricts of Sé and Passo:
  - Monte Alegre street
  - Achieta square
  - Inácio Acióli street
  - Stretch of Doze de Outubro street
  - Santa Isabel street
  - Moniz Barreto street
  - Frei Vicente street
  - Gregório de Matos street
  - Ângelo Ferraz street
  - José Alencar square
  - Padre Agostinho Gomes street
  - Eduardo Carizé street
  - João de Brito street
  - Quinze Mistérios square
  - Custódio de Melo street
  - Stretch of Joaquim Távora street
  - Barão do Triunfo square
  - Luís Viana street
  - Ribeiro dos Santos street
  - Stretch of Silva Jardim street
  - Alfredo Brito street
  - Quinze de Novembro square
- Architectural, urban and landscape site of public places on the perimeter of the subdistricts of Mares and Penha:
  - Adriano Gordilho square
  - Rio Araguaçu street
  - Rio Almada street
  - Belt of coastal waters, until aforementioned Adriano Gordilho square
- Architectural, urban and landscape site included in stretches of Otávio Mangabeira avenue comprising Chega Negro and Piatã beaches, in the subdistrict of Itapoã
- Architectural, urban and landscape site Historical Center of the City of Salvador
- Architectural site of Carneiro de Campos Sodré and Travessa Aquino Gaspar streets
- Levee, with its current water limits, comprising the urban and forest sites of the circling valleys, in subdistricts of Vitória, S. Pedro, Santana and Brotas
- Building at Cairú square, where the Model Market is located
- Building of the old Church and Hospice of Our Lady of the Good Journey and churchyard

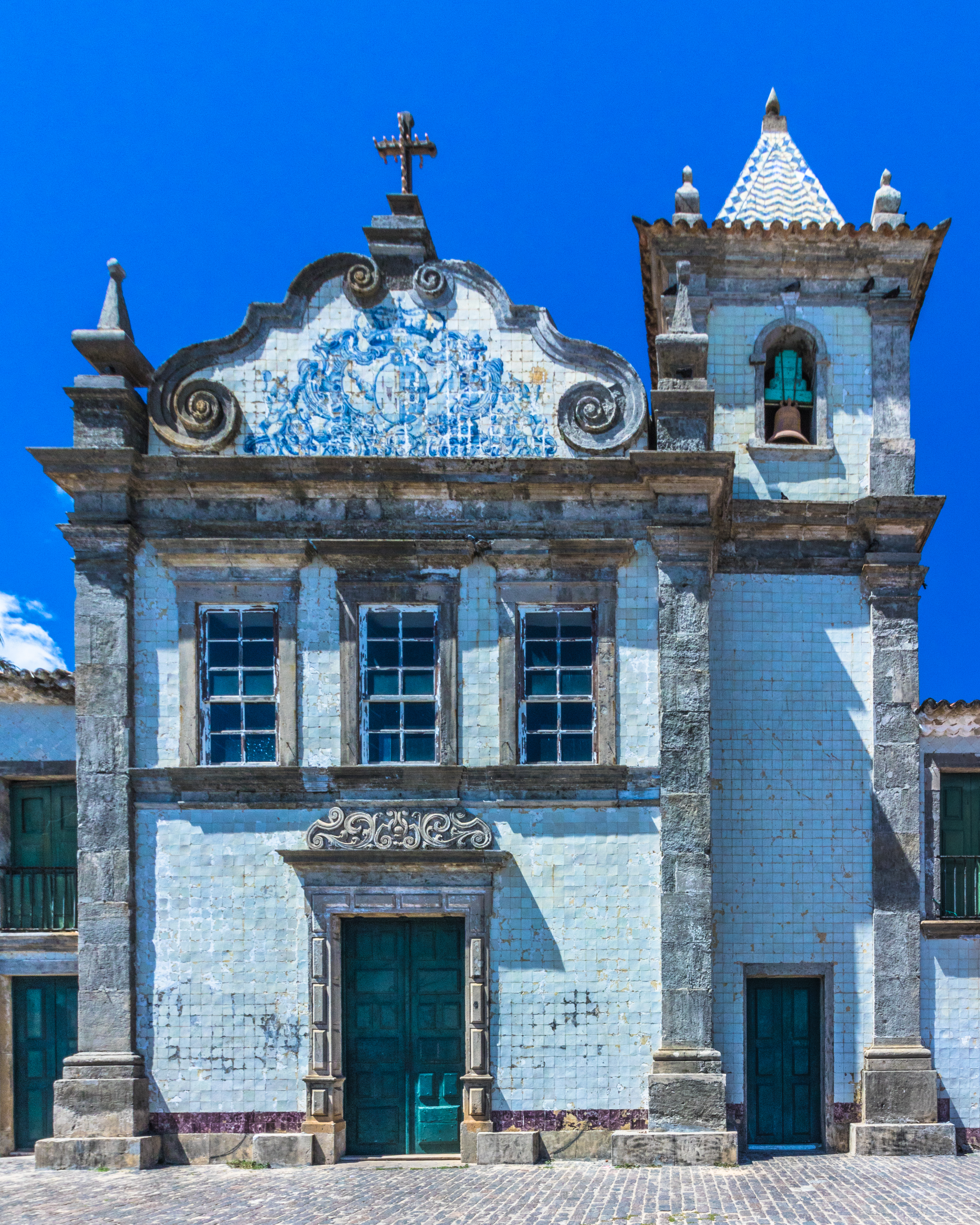
Front view of the Church and Hospice of Our Lady of the Good Journey

- Fort of São Pedro
- Fort of Barbalho or Our Lady of Monte do Carmo
- Fort of Monte Serrat
- Fort of Santa Maria
- Fort of Santo Antônio da Barra
- Fort of São Marcelo
- Fort of São Paulo of Gambôa
- Cathedral Basilica of Salvador
- Church of Good Journey, along with the old Hospice which is inseparable architecturally and constructively
- Church of Mouraria
- Church of the Third Order of Saint Francis
- Church of Palma
- Church of the Blessed Sacrament at Rua do Passo
- Church of Our Lady of Conception of Boqueirão, along with all its belongings
- Church of Our Lady of Barroquinha
- Church of Our Lady of Conception of the Beach
- Church of Our Lady of Penha and old Summer Palace of the Archbishops, including walkway that connects said buildings
- Church of Our Lady of Health
- Church of Our Lady of Snows
- Church of Santo Antônio of Barra
- Church of São Miguel
- Church of Saint Peter of the Clergymen
- Convent and Church of Our Lady of Lapa
- Convent and Church of Desterro
- Church of Pilar
- Church of the Third Order of Our Lady of the Rosary of the Black People
- Church and House of the Third Order of São Domingos

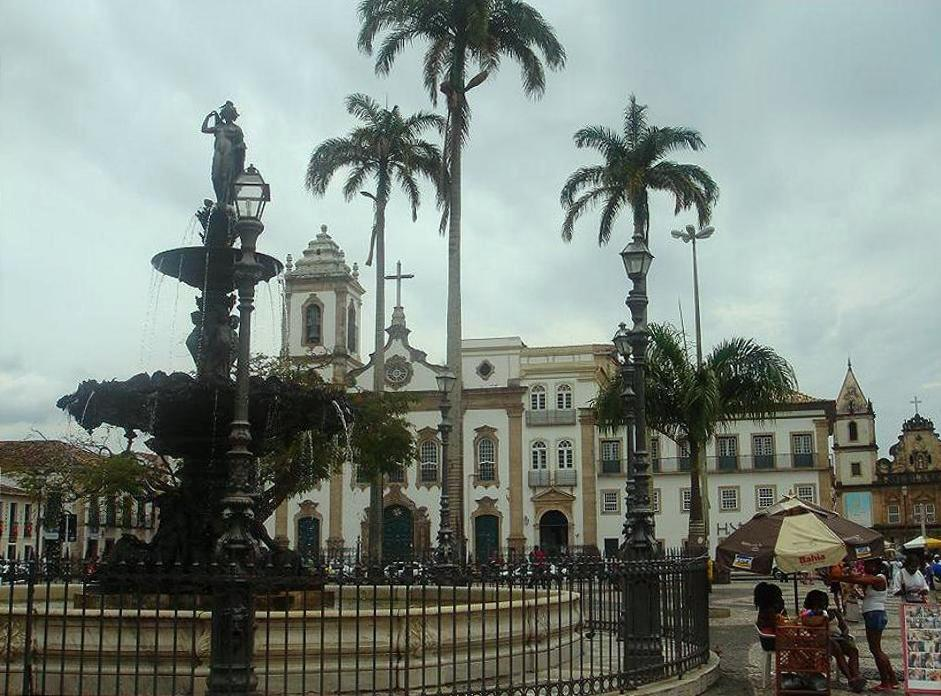
Front view of the Church and House of the Third Order of São Domingos

- Church of the Third Order of Mount Carmel
- Church and Convent of Saint Teresa
- São Francisco Church and Convent
- Church and Convent of Mount Carmel
- Church and Monastery of Our Lady of Grace
- Church and Monastery of Saint Benedict
- Church and Holy House of Mercy of Bahia
- Church of the Holy Sacrament and Sant'Ana
- Epitaphs on Church of Our Lady of Vitória
- Baron of Cajaíba family mausoleum, notably the statue of Faith, authored by Johann von Halbig
- Pascoal cross public oratory
- Berquó Mansion
- Palace of the Commercial Association of Bahia
- Archbishop's Palace of Salvador
- Palace of the Count of the Arches
- Ferrão Mansion
- Saldanha Mansion
- Park and fountain of Queimado
- Door of the 17th century mansion that currently houses the Secretary of Education and Health
- Building at J. Castro Rebelo, 5
- Building at Militão Lisboa, 80

=== Mato Grosso ===
Macapá
Image	Heritage name	Year of inclusion
	Church of Our Lady of the Rosary and Saint Benedict	1993

=== Paraíba ===
Cabedelo
Image	Heritage name	Year of inclusion
	Forte de Santa Catarina	1938
João Pessoa
Image	Heritage name	Year of inclusion
	Cultural Center San Francisco (João Pessoa)	1952
	Monastery of St. benedict (João Pessoa)	1957
	Church and convent of the Third Order of Our Lady of Carmo (João Pessoa)	1938
	Church and convent of the Third Order of Our Lady of Carmo (João Pessoa)	1938
	Church of Our Lady of Mercy (João Pessoa)	1938
	Historic Center of João Pessoa	2009
	Tito Silva Wine Factory	1984
	Source of Tambiá in João Pessoa	1941
Lucena
Image	Heritage name	Year of inclusion
	Church of Our Guide Lady	1949

== See also ==
- List of IPHAN heritage sites in the North of Brazil
