= Castro Alves, Bahia =

Municipality of Bahia, Brazil

Coordinates: 12°45′57″S 39°25′40″W

- Municipality
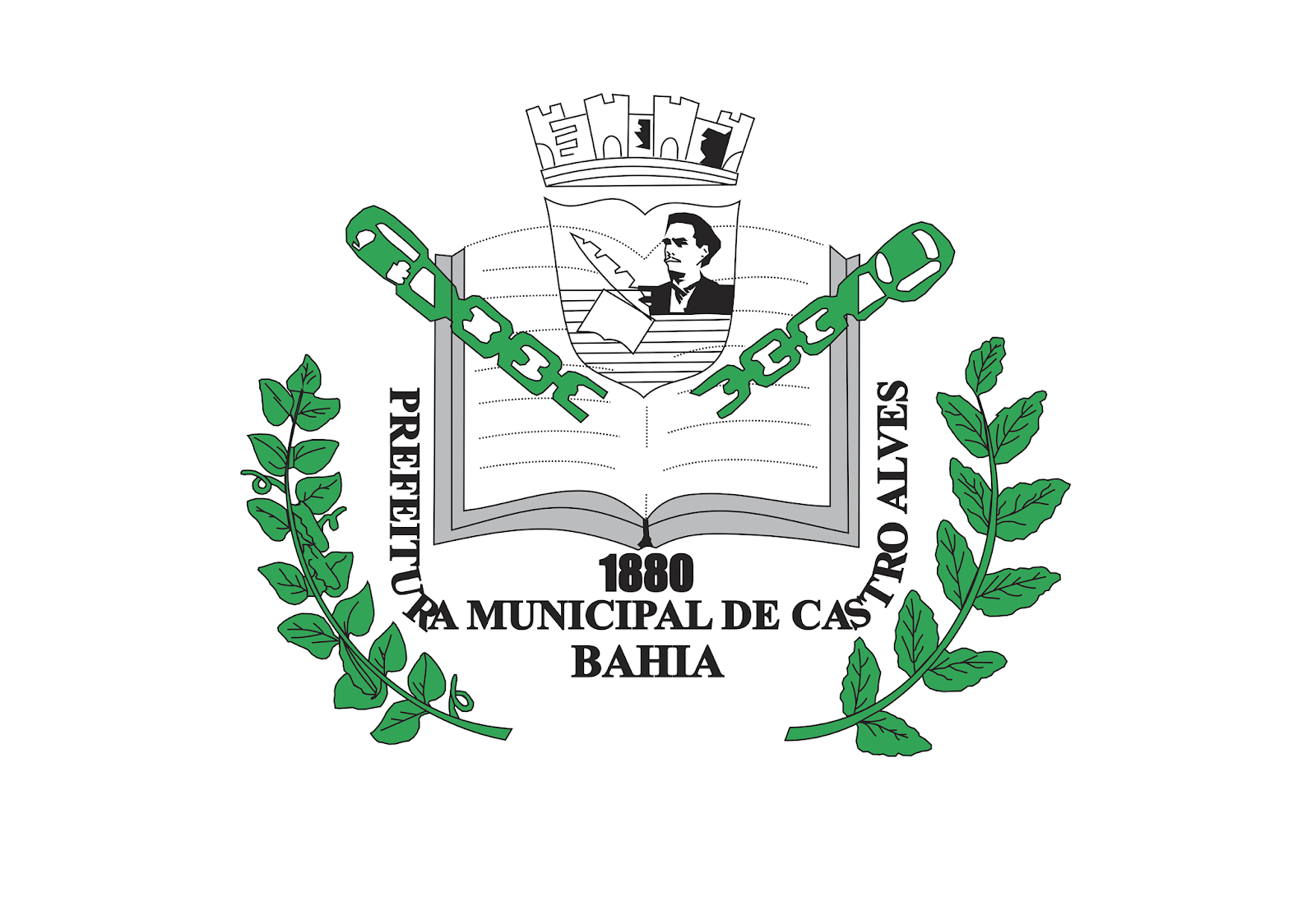
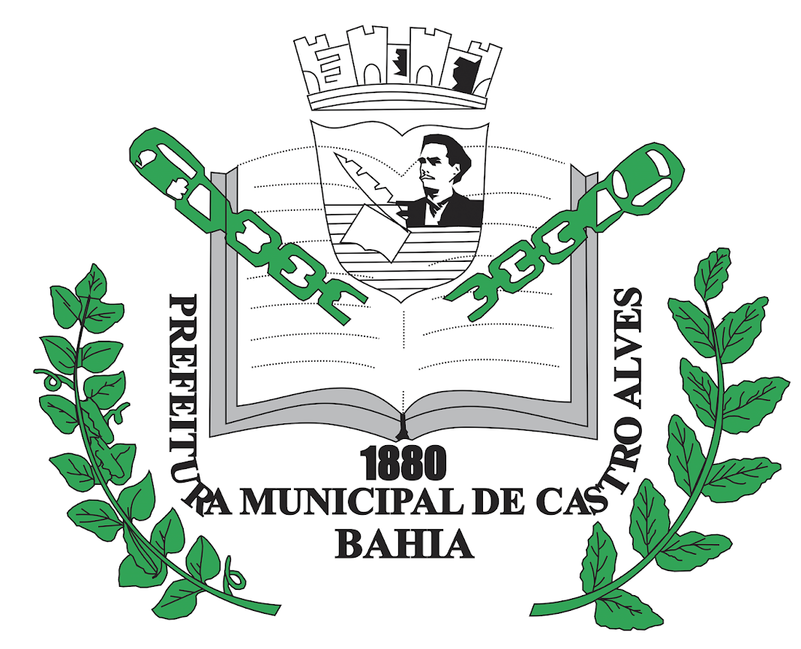
- Flag Coat of arms
- Interactive map of Castro Alves, Bahia
- Country: Brazil
- Region: Nordeste
- State: Bahia

Government

Area
  - Total: 274,648 sq mi (711,335 km^{2})

Population (2020)
  - Total: 26,318
- Time zone: UTC−3 (BRT)
- Postal code: 44500-000

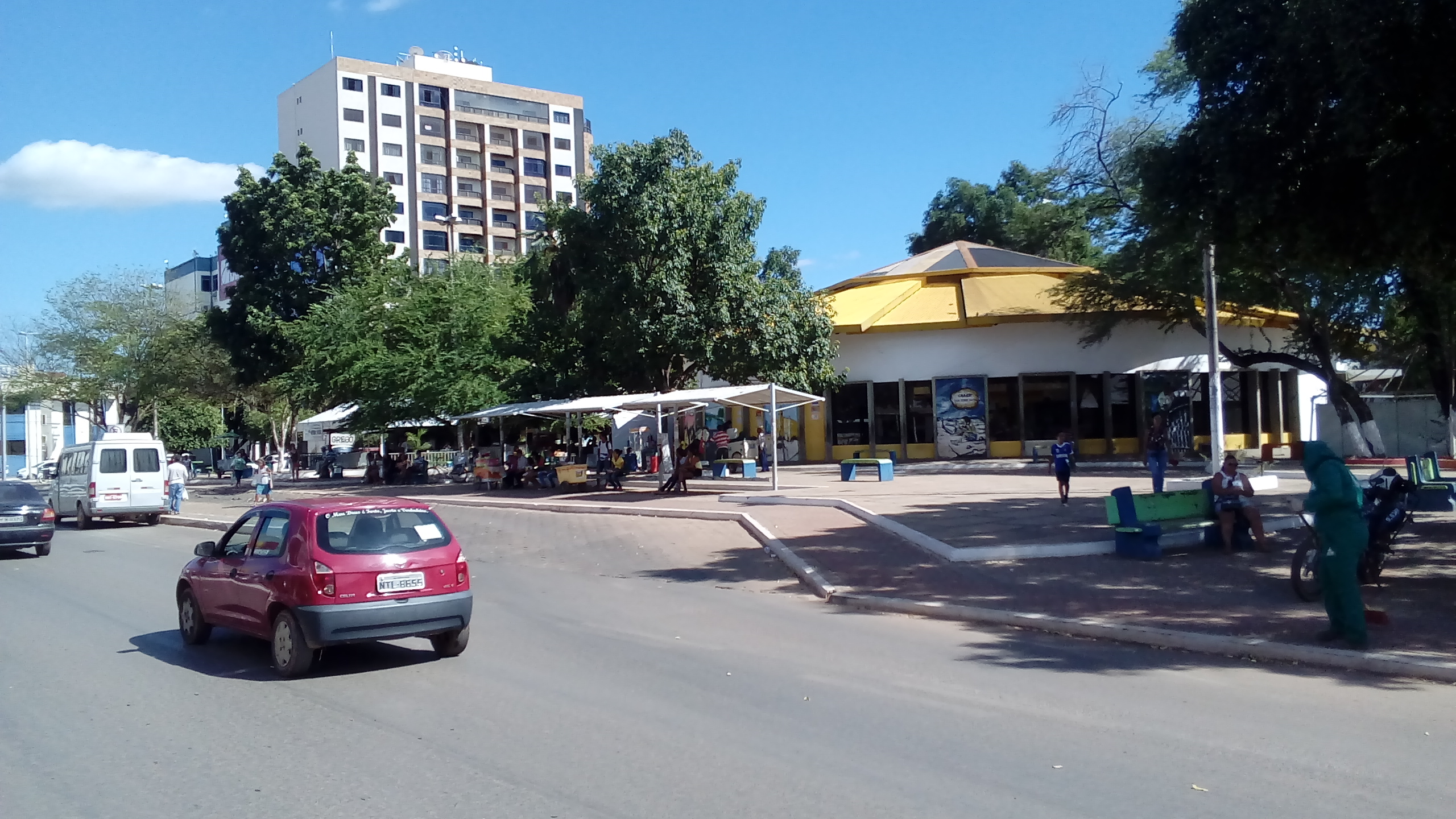
Castro Alves' main square

Castro Alves, Bahia is a municipality in the state of Bahia in the North-East region of Brazil. It was known as Vila de Nossa Senhora da Conceição de Curralinho, but it was rechristened Castro Alves in order to honor the poet who was born there.

== See also ==
- List of municipalities in Bahia
