= Roman Catholic Archdiocese of São Salvador da Bahia =

Catholic ecclesiastical territory

Coordinates: 12.9833°S 38.5167°W

Archdiocese of São Salvador da Bahia Archidioecesis Sancti Salvatoris in Brasilia

Catholic
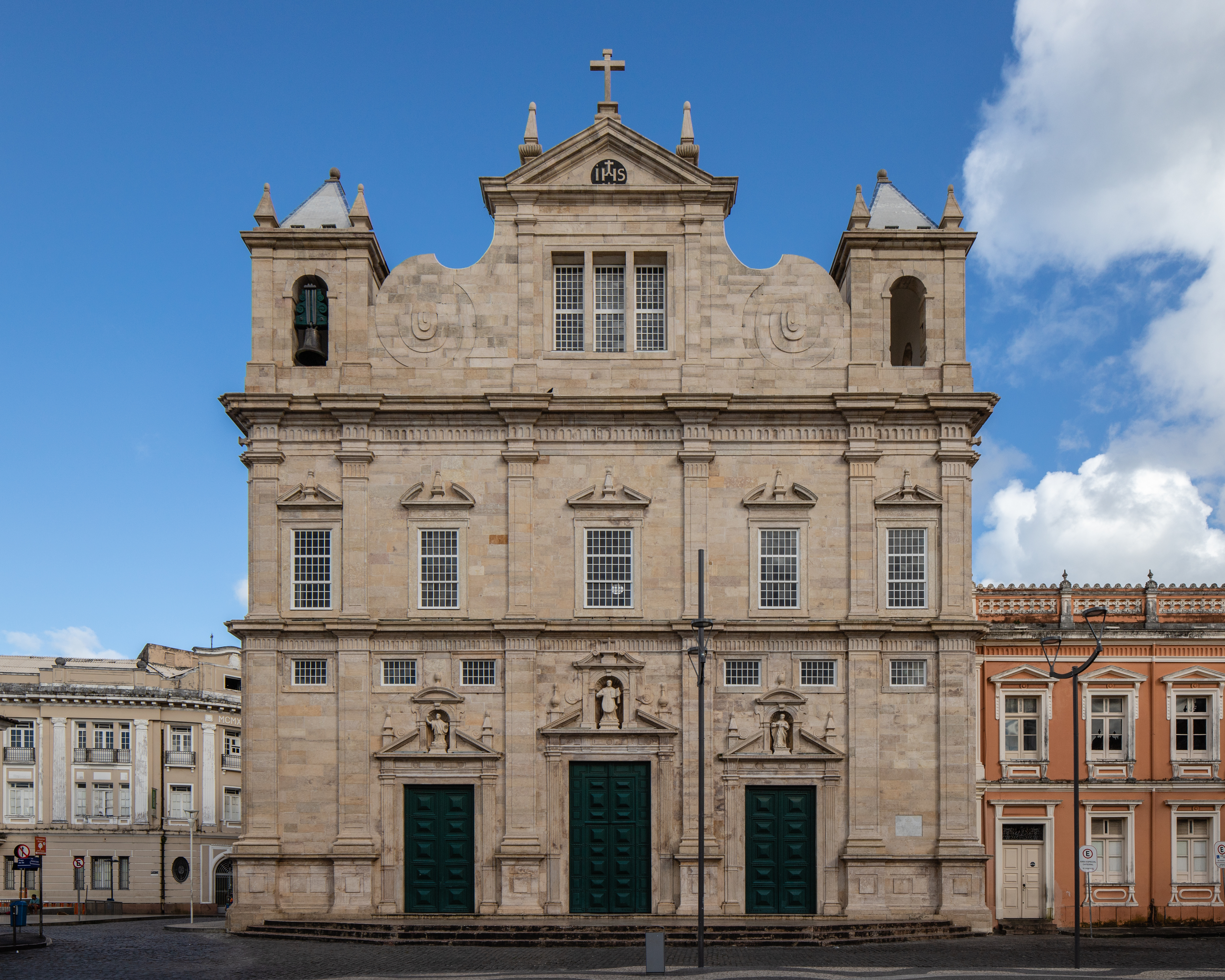
- The Primatial Cathedral Basilica

- Coat of arms

Location
- Country: Brazil

Statistics
- Area: 6,241 km^{2} (2,410 sq mi)
- Population: Total; Catholics: (as of 2004); 3,544,658; 2,495,439 (70.4%)

Information
- Rite: Latin Rite
- Established: 25 February 1551 (475 years ago)
- Cathedral: Catedral Basílica Primacial do Transfiguração do Senhor

Current leadership
- Pope: Leo XIV
- Archbishop: Sérgio da Rocha
- Auxiliary Bishops: Marco Eugênio Galrão Leite de Almeida; Valter Magno de Carvalho; Gabriel dos Santos Filho; Gilvan Pereira Rodrigues
- Bishops emeritus: Murilo Sebastião Ramos Krieger

Website
- www.arquidiocesesalvador.org.br

The Archdiocese of São Salvador da Bahia (Latin: Archidioecesis Sancti Salvatoris in Brasilia) is part of the Catholic Church in Brazil. The Archbishop of São Salvador da Bahia also carries the title Primate of Brazil. The archdiocese is located in the city of Salvador, Bahia.

The Archdiocese offers a wide range of services to complement parish provision. These are listed on the Archdiocesan website. These include, for example, the Pastoral do Menor service working together with CEIFAR in Tancredo Neves to support young people and families by providing guidance on sexuality and family planning

== Statistics ==
Over 70% of the Archiocese is Catholic, while there is over 9,000 Catholics per priest, spread over 109 parishes with the Archdiocese.

== History ==
- 25 February 1551: Established as Diocese of São Salvador da Bahia de Todos os Santos from the Metropolitan Archdiocese of Funchal, Portugal
- 16 November 1676: Promoted as Metropolitan Archdiocese of São Salvador da Bahia

== Properties ==
- Minor Basilica & World Heritage Church:
  - Cathedral of Salvador (Sé Basílica Primacial da Transfiguração do Senhor)
  - Basilica of St. Sebastian, Salvador (Basílica Arquiabacial de São Sebastião, the first benedictine monastery in the New World)
  - Church of Nosso Senhor do Bonfim, Salvador (Basílica do Senhor do Bonfim)
  - Basilica of the Immaculate Conception, Salvador (Basílica de Nossa Senhora da Conceição da Praia)
- Churches
  - Church of Our Lady of Penha, a national heritage site in Salvador
  - Church of the Blessed Sacrament of Saint Anne, a national heritage site in Salvador
  - Church and Convent of Our Lady of the Exile, a national heritage site in Salvador
  - Chapel of Our Lady of Help, a national heritage site in Salvador
  - Chapel of Our Lady of the Ladder, a national heritage site in Salvador
  - Chapel of Our Lady of the Snows on the Ilha de Maré, a national heritage site
  - Church and Monastery of Our Lady of Monserrate, a national heritage site in Salvador
  - Church and Hospice of Our Lady of the Good Journey, a national heritage site in Salvador
  - Parish Church of Saint Bartholomew, a national heritage site in Maragogipe
- Residences
  - Archbishop's Palace of Salvador

=== Former properties ===
The archdiocese abandoned the Church of the Third Order of the Holy Trinity in 1990. The church now houses a social project and Catholic residential community.

== Bishops ==
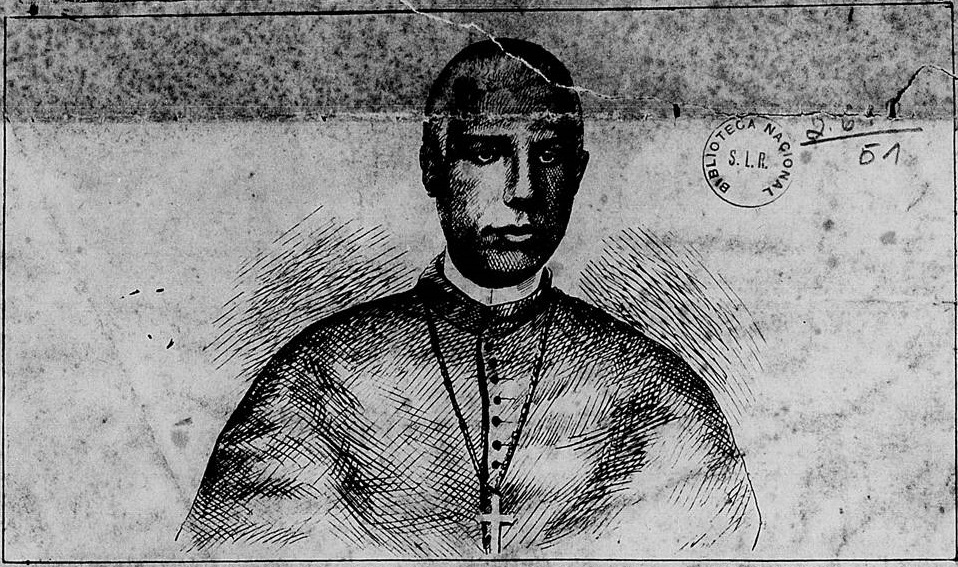
Manuel Joaquim da Silveira, Archbishop of Bahia, Count of São Salvador.

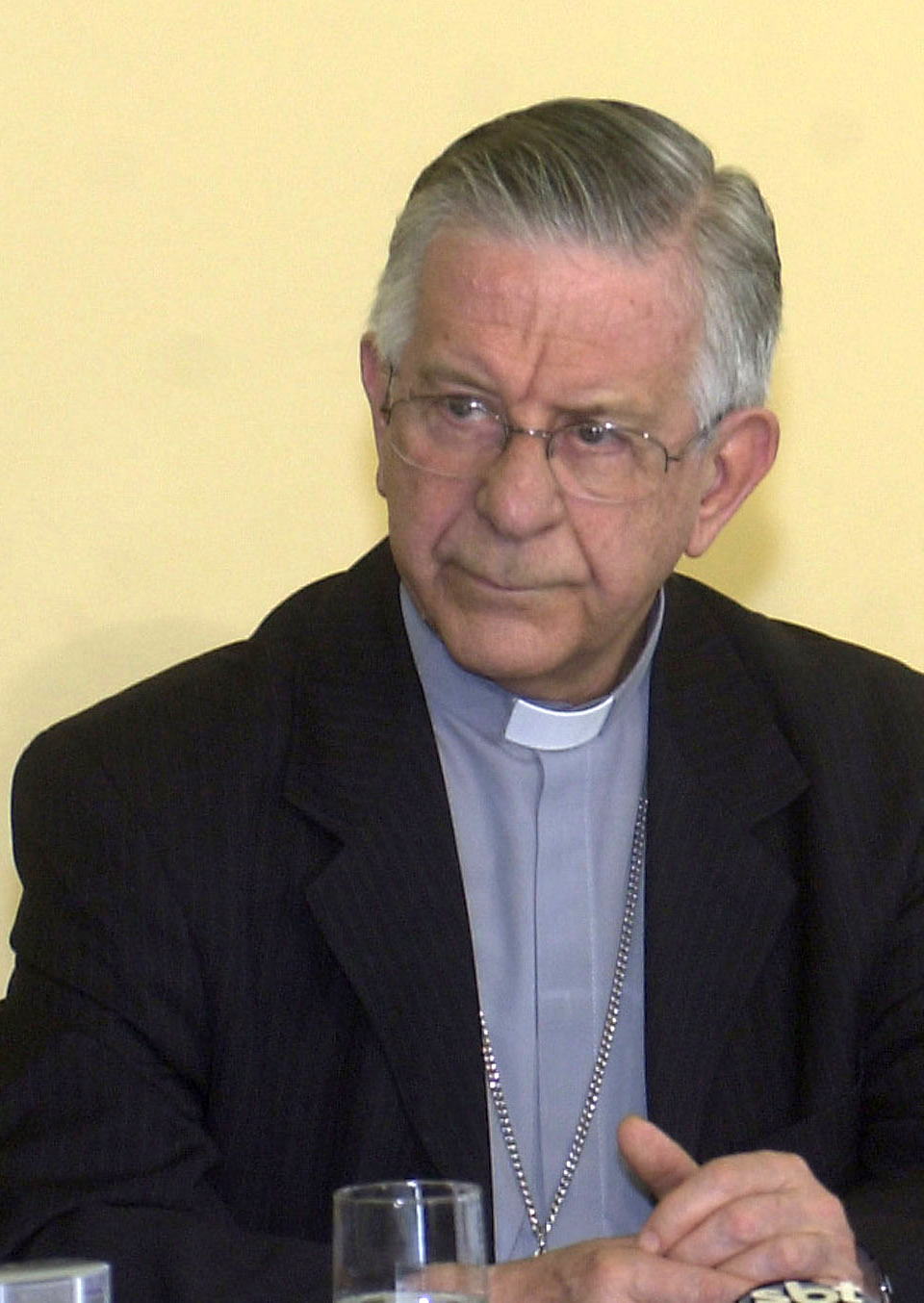
Cardinal and Archbishop of São Salvador da Bahia Geraldo Majella Agnelo in 2006 Photo: Marcello Casal Jr/ABr.

=== Ordinaries ===
Bishops

- Pedro Fernandes Sardinha (25 Feb 1551 - 2 Jun 1556 )
- Pedro Leitão (23 Mar 1558 - Oct 1573 )
- Antônio Barreiros (20 Jul 1575 - 11 May 1600 )
- Constantino Barradas (23 Sep 1602 - Jun 1618 )
- Marcos Teixeira de Mendonça (25 Oct 1621 - 8 Oct 1624 )
- Miguel Pereira (29 Nov 1627 - 16 Aug 1630 )
- Pedro da Silva Sampaio (6 Sep 1632 - 15 Apr 1649 )
- Estevão dos Santos Carneiro de Moraes (17 Jun 1669 - 6 Jun 1672 )
- Constantino Sampaio (1672 - 1672)
- Estevão dos Santos Carneiro de Moraes (15 Apr 1672 - 6 Jun 1672 )

Archbishops

- Gaspar Barata de Mendonça (16 Nov 1676 - 1681 )
- João da Madre de Deus Araújo (4 May 1682 - 13 Jun 1686 )
- Manoel da Ressurreição (12 May 1687 - 16 Jan 1691 )
- João Franco de Oliveira (9 Jan 1692 - 18 Apr 1701 ), appointed Archbishop (personal title) of Miranda (do Douro), Portugal
- Sebastião Monteiro da Vida (8 Aug 1701 - 7 Sep 1722 )
- Ludovico Alvares de Figueiredo (21 Feb 1725 - 27 Aug 1735 )
- José de Fialho (3 Sep 1738 Appointed - 2 Jan 1741)
- José Botelho de Matos (2 Jan 1741 - 7 Jan 1760 )
- Manoel de Santa Ines Ferreira (6 Aug 1770 - 22 Jun 1771 )
- Joaquim Borges de Figueroa (8 Mar 1773 - 13 Jul 1778 )
- Antônio de São José Moura Marinho (20 Jul 1778 - 9 Aug 1779 )
- Antônio Corrêa (13 Dec 1779 - 12 Jul 1802 )
- José de Santa Escolástica Álvares Pereira (16 Mar 1804 - 3 Jan 1814 )
- Francisco de São Damazo Abreu Vieira (15 Mar 1815 - 18 Nov 1816 )
- Vicente da Soledade e Castro (28 Aug 1820 - 31 Mar 1823 )
- Romualdo Antônio de Seixas Barroso (21 May 1827 - 29 Dec 1860 )
- Manoel Joaquim da Silveira (5 Jan 1861 - 23 Jun 1874 )
- Joaquim Gonçalves de Azevedo (19 Dec 1876 - 6 Nov 1879 )
- Luiz Antônio dos Santos (13 Mar 1881 - 26 Jun 1890 )
- Antônio de Macedo Costa (26 Jun 1890 - 20 Mar 1891 )
- Jerónimo Thomé da Silva (12 Sep 1893 - 15 Feb 1924 )
- Augusto Álvaro da Silva (17 Dec 1924 - 14 Aug 1968 ), Cardinal in 1953
- Eugênio de Araújo Sales (29 Oct 1968 - 13 Mar 1971 ), Cardinal in 1969; appointed Archbishop of São Sebastião do Rio de Janeiro
- Avelar Brandão Vilela (25 Mar 1971 - 19 Dec 1986 ), Cardinal in 1973
- Lucas Moreira Neves (9 Jul 1987 - 25 Jun 1998 ), Cardinal in 1988; appointed Prefect of the Congregation for Bishops
- Geraldo Majella Agnelo (13 Jan 1999 - 12 Jan 2011 ), Cardinal in 2001
- Murilo Sebastião Ramos Krieger (12 Jan 2011 - 11 Mar 2020 )
- Sérgio da Rocha (11 Mar 2020 - current), Cardinal in 2016

=== Coadjutor archbishop ===
- João de Souza Lima (1980-1981), did not succeed to see

=== Auxiliary bishops ===
- Manoel dos Santos Pereira (1890-1893), appointed Bishop of Olinda
- Antônio de Mendonça Monteiro (1950-1957), appointed Bishop of Bonfim, Bahia
- José Terceiro de Sousa (1955-1957), appointed Bishop of Penedo, Alagoas
- Walfrido Teixeira Vieira (1961-1965), appointed Bishop of Sobral, Ceara
- Adriano Mandarino Hypólito, O.F.M. (1962-1966), appointed Bishop of Nova Iguaçu, Rio de Janeiro
- Valfredo Bernardo Tepe, O.F.M. (1967-1971), appointed Bishop of Ilhéus, Bahia
- Ângelo Domingos Salvador, O.F.M. Cap. (1981-1986), appointed Prelate of Coxim, Mato Grosso do Sul
- Carlos José Boaventura Kloppenburg, O.F.M. (1982-1986), appointed Bishop of Novo Hamburgo, Rio Grande do Sul
- José Carlos Melo, C.M. (1991-2000), became Archbishop (personal title) in 1999; appointed Coadjutor Archbishop of Maceió, Alagoas
- José Antônio Aparecido Tosi Marques (1991-1999), appointed Archbishop of Fortaleza, Ceara
- Walmor Oliveira de Azevedo (1998-2004), appointed Archbishop of Belo Horizonte, Minas Gerais
- Dominique Marie Jean Denis You (2002-2006), appointed Bishop of Santíssima Conceição do Araguaia
- Josafá Menezes da Silva (2005-2010), appointed Bishop of Barreiras, Bahia
- João Carlos Petrini (2005-2010), appointed Bishop of Camaçari, Bahia
- Gregório Paixão Neto (2006-2012), appointed Bishop of Petrópolis, Rio de Janeiro
- Gilson Andrade da Silva (2011-2018), appointed Coadjutor Bishop of Nova Iguaçu, Rio de Janeiro
- Giovanni Crippa, I.M.C. (2012-2014), appointed Bishop of Estância, Sergipe
- Marco Eugênio Galrão Leite de Almeida (2013-)
- Estevam dos Santos Silva Filho (2014-2020), appointed Bishop of Ruy Barbosa (Rui Barbosa), Bahia
- Hélio Pereira dos Santos (2016-)
- Dorival Souza Barreto Júnior (until 2025), appointed Bishop of Januária
- Gabriel dos Santos Filho (since 2025)
- Gilvan Pereira Rodrigues (since 2025)

=== Other priests of this diocese who became bishops ===
- Manoel da Silva Gomes, appointed Auxiliary Bishop of Fortaleza (Ceará) in 1911
- Miguel de Lima Valverde, appointed Bishop of Santa Maria, Rio Grande do Sul in 1911

== Suffragan dioceses ==
- Diocese of Alagoinhas
- Diocese of Amargosa
- Diocese of Camaçari
- Diocese of Cruz das Almas
- Diocese of Eunápolis
- Diocese of Ilhéus
- Diocese of Itabuna
- Diocese of Teixeira de Freitas-Caravelas
