= Camaçari =

Municipality of Bahia, Brazil

Camaçari Município de Camaçari
- Municipality
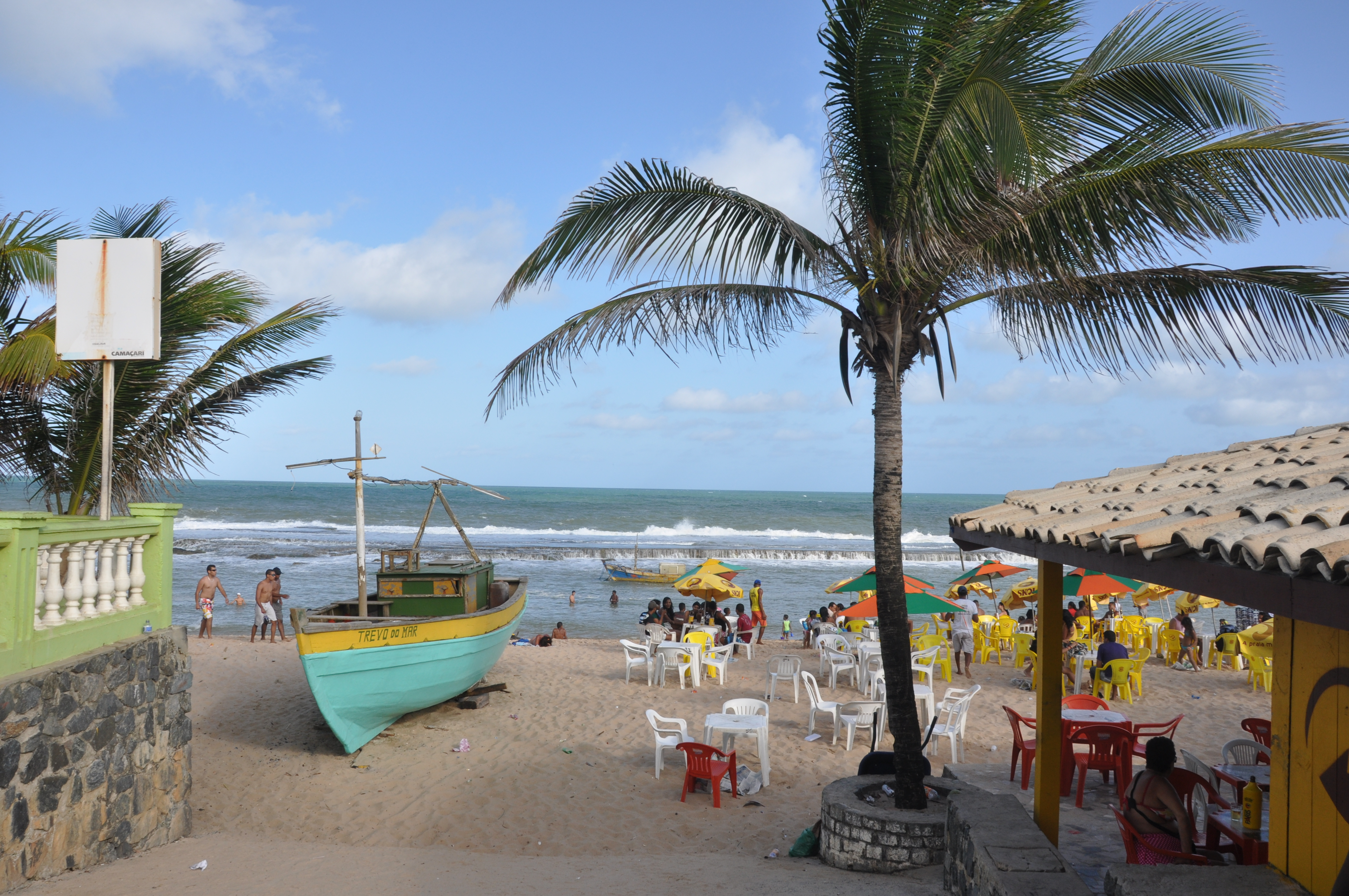
- Costa Coqueiros, Arembepe, in Camaçari.

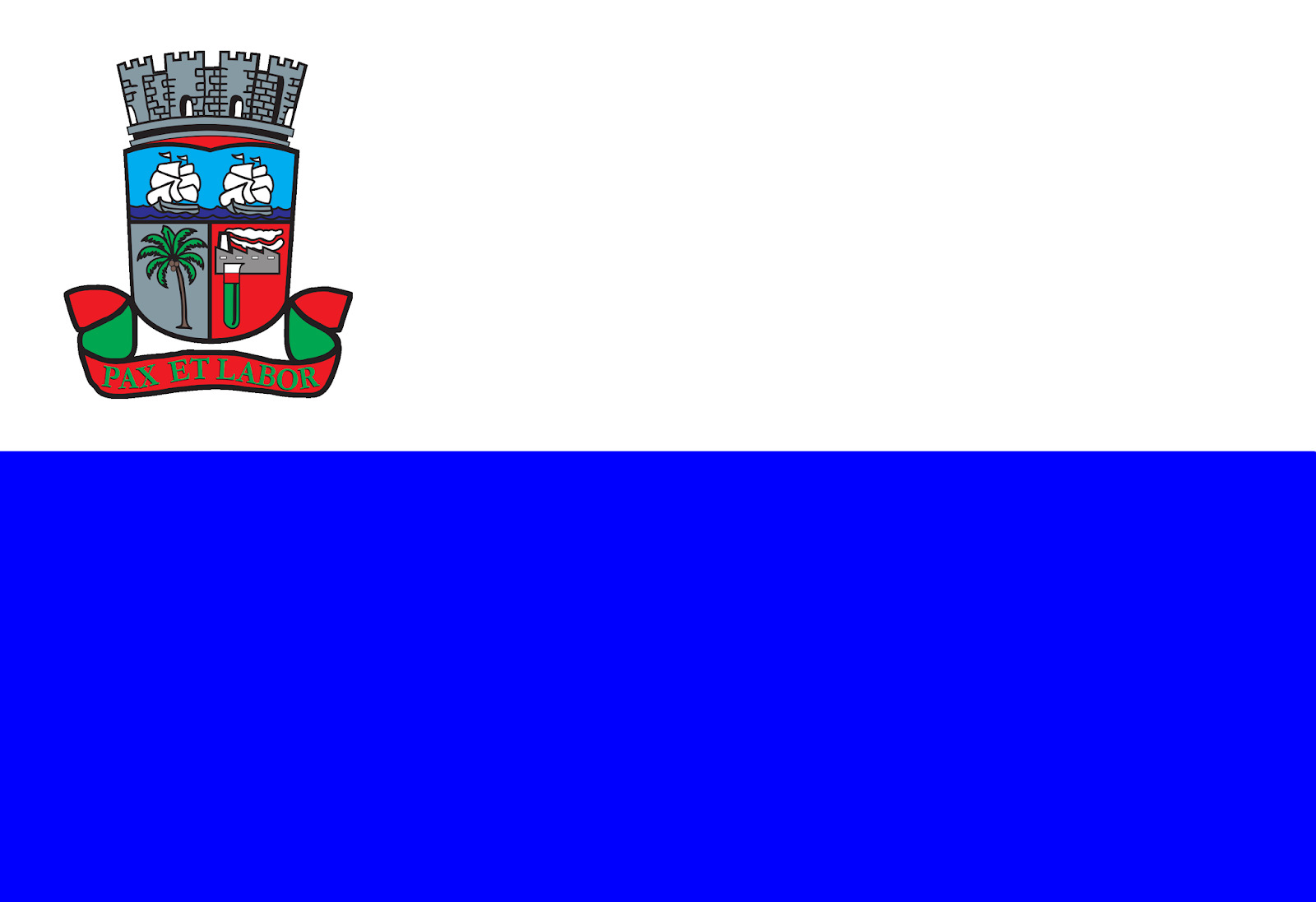
- Flag Coat of arms

- Location of Camaçari in Bahia

- Location of Camaçari in Brazil
- Coordinates: 12°41′52″S 38°19′26″W
- Country: Brazil
- Region: Northeast
- State: Bahia
- Founded: 09/28/1758

Government
  - Mayor: Luiz Caetano (PT) (2025-2028)

Area
  - Total: 784.658 km^{2} (302.958 sq mi)
- Elevation: 36 m (118 ft)

Population (2025)
  - Total: 321,636
  - Density: 409.906/km^{2} (1,061.65/sq mi)
- Demonym: camaçariense
- Time zone: UTC−3 (BRT)
- Website: www.camacari.ba.gov.br

Camaçari is a city in Bahia, Brazil. It is located at 12°41′51″S 38°19′27″W. It is part of the Salvador Metropolitan Region (Região Metropolitana de Salvador), being the industrial city of the metropolis. Camaçari covers 784.658 km^{2} (302.958 mi^{2}), and had an estimated population of 304,302 in 2020, with a population density of 310 per square kilometer. The municipality consists of three districts: Camaçari, Abrantes, and Monte Gordo.

== History ==
The area of Camaçari was inhabited by Tupinambá ethnic group prior to the arrival of the Portuguese. The first Portuguese settlement was in 1558 by two Jesuit priests, João Gonçalves and Antônio Rodrigues. They formed a village called Aldeia do Divino Espírito Santo. Aldeia do Divino Espírito Santo played an important role in the expulsion of the Dutch who arrived in Bahia in the 17th century. Troops under the leadership of bishop D. Mark Teixeira drove out the Dutch in 1624. The name of the village was changed to Vila de Nova Abrantes do Espírito Santo on September 28, 1758 under orders from the Marquiq de Pombal. The Jesuits were also expelled from the area at the same time. Later the village came to be known simply as Vila de Abrantes.

== Economy ==
Several factories and petrochemical plants compose one of the largest industrial areas in Brazil and the largest of the Northeast region of the country. The Brazilian multinational company Braskem, the largest petrochemical company in the Americas by production capacity, owns a major petrochemical complex in Camaçari. It is the largest in Brazil, along with that of Triunfo, which is also owned by Braskem. The city was also home to a large automobile factory owned by the Ford Motor Company.

== Notable people ==
- Fabiano Santacroce - professional footballer
- Lins - professional footballer

== Climate ==
Climate data for Camaçari (1981–2010)
| Month | Jan | Feb | Mar | Apr | May | Jun | Jul | Aug | Sep | Oct | Nov | Dec | Year |
|---|---|---|---|---|---|---|---|---|---|---|---|---|---|
| Mean daily maximum °C (°F) | 31.7 (89.1) | 31.6 (88.9) | 31.4 (88.5) | 30.2 (86.4) | 29.0 (84.2) | 27.5 (81.5) | 27.1 (80.8) | 27.1 (80.8) | 28.3 (82.9) | 29.7 (85.5) | 30.5 (86.9) | 31.4 (88.5) | 29.6 (85.3) |
| Daily mean °C (°F) | 26.4 (79.5) | 26.5 (79.7) | 26.4 (79.5) | 25.6 (78.1) | 24.5 (76.1) | 23.3 (73.9) | 22.6 (72.7) | 22.6 (72.7) | 23.6 (74.5) | 24.8 (76.6) | 25.6 (78.1) | 26.2 (79.2) | 24.8 (76.6) |
| Mean daily minimum °C (°F) | 22.1 (71.8) | 22.2 (72.0) | 22.4 (72.3) | 21.9 (71.4) | 21.2 (70.2) | 20.0 (68.0) | 19.1 (66.4) | 18.9 (66.0) | 19.6 (67.3) | 20.6 (69.1) | 21.6 (70.9) | 22.1 (71.8) | 21.0 (69.8) |
| Average precipitation mm (inches) | 87.0 (3.43) | 101.7 (4.00) | 143.7 (5.66) | 226.9 (8.93) | 244.4 (9.62) | 232.8 (9.17) | 184.9 (7.28) | 139.7 (5.50) | 103.0 (4.06) | 85.8 (3.38) | 111.8 (4.40) | 74.9 (2.95) | 1,736.6 (68.37) |
| Average precipitation days (≥ 1.0 mm) | 9 | 9 | 12 | 16 | 17 | 19 | 19 | 18 | 11 | 7 | 9 | 6 | 152 |
| Average relative humidity (%) | 76.7 | 77.4 | 79.8 | 82.9 | 85.3 | 86.3 | 84.9 | 83.6 | 81.7 | 78.5 | 78.7 | 77.5 | 81.1 |
| Mean monthly sunshine hours | 216.5 | 188.1 | 204.7 | 176.9 | 173.3 | 139.2 | 173.2 | 174.2 | 184.4 | 209.2 | 185.6 | 197.8 | 2,223.1 |
Source: Instituto Nacional de Meteorologia

== See also ==
- Roman Catholic Diocese of Camaçari
- List of municipalities in Bahia
