= Itapagipe Peninsula =

Peninsula in Salvador, Bahia, Brazil

Itapagipe Peninsula Península de Itapagipe
- Peninsula
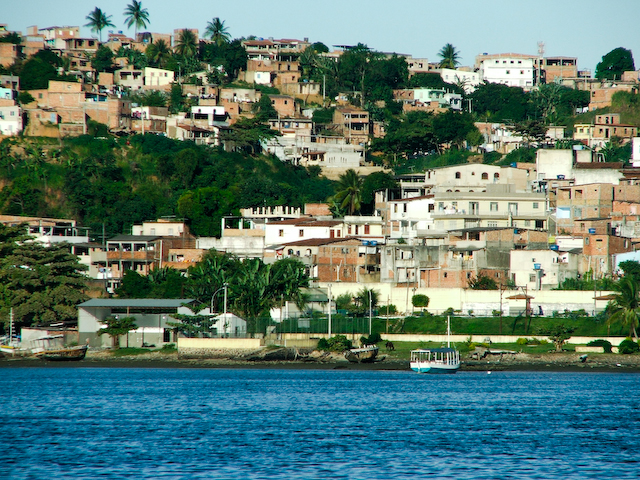
- Praia da Ribeira, bairro da Ribeira.

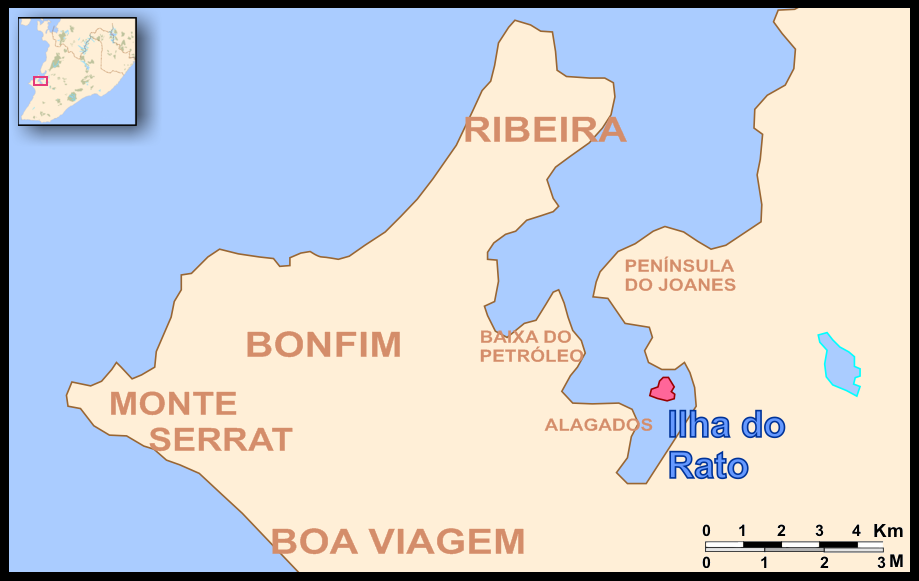
- Coordinates: 12°55′S 38°30′W
- Location: Northeast Region, Brazil, Brazil
- Offshore water bodies: Atlantic Ocean, Baía de Todos os Santos

The Itapagipe Peninsula (Portuguese: [itapaˈʒipi]) is a peninsula located in the city of Salvador, capital of the Brazilian state of Bahia. The peninsula comprises Administrative Region III, including the neighborhoods of Alagados, Boa Viagem beach, Bonfim, Monte Serrat, Ribeira, Uruguai, Mares, Roma, Caminho de Areia, Vila Ruy Barbosa, and Massaranduba, among others. Rua Fernandes Viêira and Avenida Afrânio Peixoto roughly form a boundary between the peninsula and the city of Salvador. The Church of Our Lady of Penha (Portuguese: Igreja de Nossa Senhora da Penha), one of the earliest structures, occupies the northern tip of the peninsula.

== Etymology ==
The name "Itapagipe" comes from the Tupi language and means "place of the stone in the river" (ita, stone + paba, place + 'y, river + pe, in).

== History ==
The peninsula was settled soon after the founding of Salvador in the mid-16th century. The historic center of Salvador, which sits a high bluff, was subject to frequent landslides throughout the colonial period. They caused widespread destruction, both the death of residents of the area and the destruction of public building. Marcos de Noronha, Viceroy of Brazil from 1806 to 1808, transferred the administration of Salvador to the peninsula, and called on the architects João Silva Muniz and José da Costa e Silva, both of Rio de Janeiro, to oversee the project. A navigable channel was planned at the isthmus the peninsula was planned, but the project was abandoned and the channel never built.

== Neighborhoods ==
- Alagados
- Bonfim
- Caminho de Areia
- Mares
- Massaranduba
- Monte Serrat
- Ribeira
- Roma
- Uruguai
- Vila Ruy Barbosa

== Historic structures ==
The Itapagipe Peninsula, due to its early settlement by the Portuguese, is home to a designated historic district and numerous protected structures by federal, state, and municipal authorities. They range in construction from the 16th to 19th centuries.

- Perimeter of the Penha Subdistrict (Perímetro do Subdistrito da Penha)
- Church of Nosso Senhor do Bonfim
- Church of Our Lady of Penha
- Church and Hospice of Our Lady of the Good Journey (Igreja e Hospício de Nossa Senhora da Boa Viagem)
- Largo da Madragoa, no. 08
- Solar Amado Bahia
- Antigo Hospital Português e Jardins
- Church and Monastery of Our Lady of Monserrate (Igreja e Mosteiro de Nossa Senhora do Monte Serrat)
- Fort of Monserrate (Forte do Monte Serrat)
- Dom Pedro II Home
- Fábrica Fratelli
