= Church of the Third Order of the Holy Trinity =

Abandoned church in Bahia, Brazil

- Igreja da Ordem Terceira da Santíssima Trindade
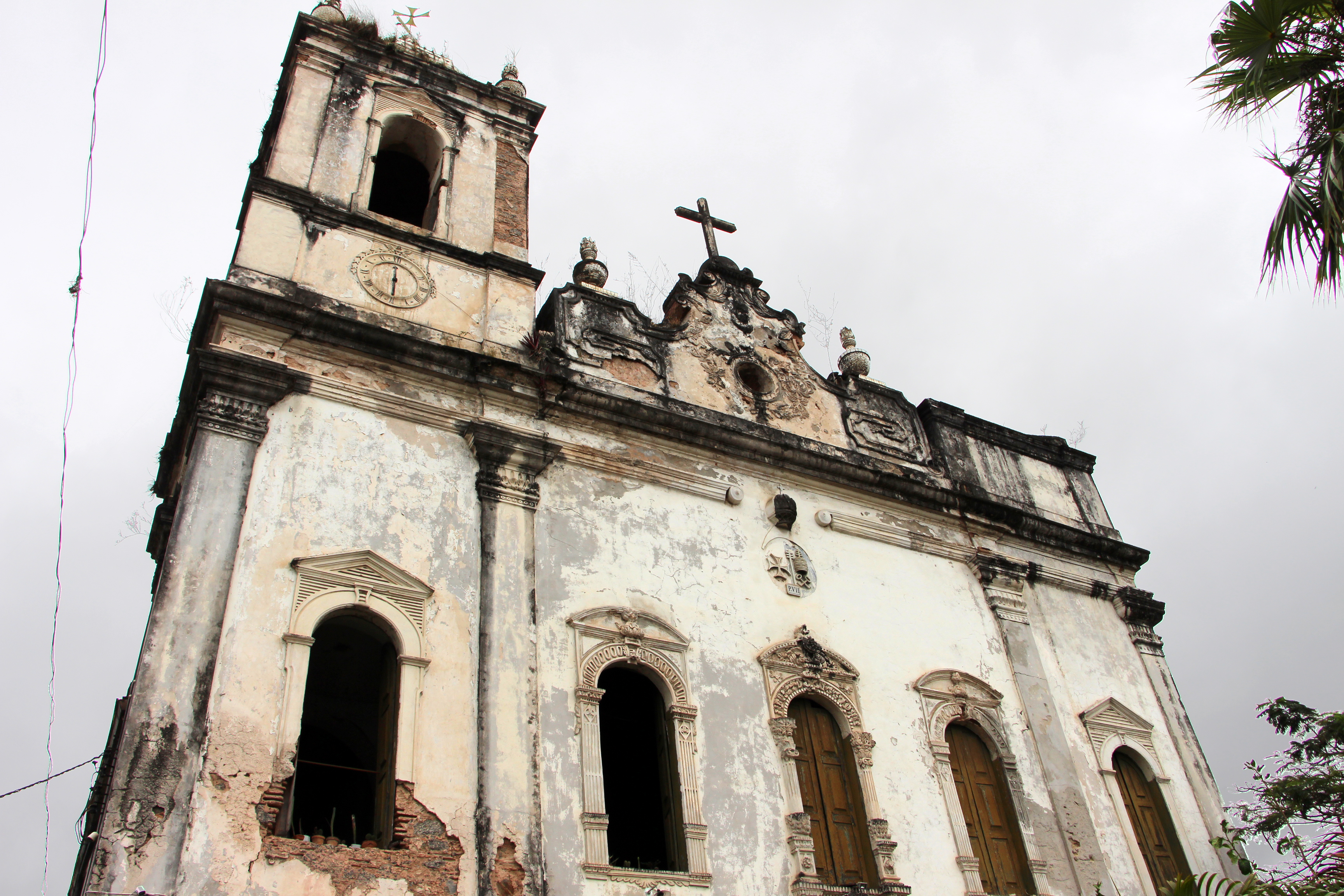
- Façade of the Church of the Third Order of the Holy Trinity

- Location of the Church of the Third Order of the Holy Trinity in Brazil

Religion
- Affiliation: Catholic
- Rite: Roman

Location
- Municipality: Salvador
- State: Bahia
- Country: Brazil
- Interactive map of Church of the Third Order of the Holy Trinity
- Coordinates: 12.960172°S 38.503186°W

The Church of the Third Order of the Holy Trinity (Portuguese: Igreja da Ordem Terceira da Santíssima Trindade) is an abandoned Roman Catholic church located in Salvador, capital of the Brazilian state of Bahia. First built as a chapel in 1733 and later expanded into its current structure in 1739, the church was abandoned by the Archdiocese of São Salvador in 1990. Located in the decadent Água de Meninos neighbourhood, the church was abandoned for a whole decade until it was reclaimed by a group of homeless people known as the Trinity community in 2000.

== History ==
In 1733, the Brotherhood of the Rosary and the Holy Trinity took a piece of land from the parish of Santo Antônio Além do Carmo to build a chapel dedicated to both Our Lady of the Rosary and the Holy Trinity. This temple was built on the hill which gives access to the Água de Meninos neighbourhood. In 1739, the Brotherhood opted to build a larger temple in the current location In his 1800 document describing the city, Luís dos Santos Vilhena notes that the temple was known as Church of the Rosary. In this document, the church is described as having no towers yet.

In 1806, Pope Pius VII extinguished the Brotherhood of the Rosary and the Holy Trinity and created, in its place, the Third Order of the Holy Trinity – hence the church's name. In 1877, the government of Bahia donated the area of the Bom Jesus cemetery to the Order. In 1888, a fire consumed most of the church, leaving only its exterior walls intact. In 1968, the right tower collapsed after a storm. In 1990, the last Mass was held in the church and it was completely abandoned for the next ten years.

In 2000, a Catholic monk named Henrique Peregrino organized a pilgrimage to Salvador and included the church in his travel itinerary. To his and his fellow pilgrims’ surprise, the church was closed. He then sought local Catholic authorities regarding the possibly of re-opening the church so that it could serve as a shelter for the poor. According to Peregrino, around a hundred people are assisted by him each year. Since 2007, he edits a bi-monthly newspaper called Aurora da Rua, which has a circulation of 10,000 and aims to generate income for the homeless people he shelters in the abandoned church.

== Structure ==
The church is located on a flat terrain in the flank of the escarpment that divides Salvador into the Upper City and the Lower City. Its location in Avenida Jequitáia is near the Água de Meninos fish market, and the church building is accessed by a stairway. It has three aisles and its façade contains Rococo and Neoclassical elements, although it was damaged by the 1888 fire, poorly planned and implemented restorations, and the crumbling of the right tower in 1968. According to the Institute of Artistic and Cultural Heritage of Bahia, the building was "damaged by the insertion of non-conforming elements such as concrete slabs in the galleries". It no longer has windows and its images – "of the Holy Trinity, Our Lady of the Remedy and many others of lesser importance" – were collected by members of the Order due to the state of deterioration of the building. The members of the Trinity community have promoted small restorations and included on the altar, images and religious elements from the various religions present in Salvador. Around the church there are 20 houses, some of which are rented or made available for the members of the Trinity community.

== The Trinity community ==
The Trinity community is a civil society group that provides assistance to the homeless population that live around the Historic Center of Salvador. Founded by the Catholic monk Henrique Peregrino, it refuses the label of non-governmental organization, considering that its philosophy and action differ from the NGO philosophy. There are 45 permanent residents in the church grounds, in addition to 50–60 homeless people which attend ecumenical cults and banquets held each Thursday. The food is prepared by the residents and the maintenance and cleaning of the spaces is made by everyone. Although it mostly caters to adults, the Trinity community maintains a project aimed specifically at young people. This project is run by a team formed by seven educators and two therapists, treating on average 50 to 60 children per day, performing a total of 1,200 consultations per month.

The community aims to overcome the homelessness of its members by adopting a five-step program. The first step is that of food: it is about feeding, sharing the meal and participating in its preparation, putting an end to the begging for food. The second step concerns the reception of newcomers, regardless of their situation – they may be either guests or new members of the Community. The third step is caring: regularizing the documentation of the homeless and/or restoring their health. The fourth step involves gaining independence through income generation: the community members produce sacred art and grow flowers and fruits for sale; they collect cardboard to sell for recycling; and sell the Aurora da Rua newspaper, which they write themselves. There are also cases in which members of the Trinity community gain access to a formal job through covenants that Peregrino maintains with private companies. The fifth and final step is gaining access to housing, and it represents an end with the homelessness situation.

== Access ==
Church of the Third Order of the Holy Trinity is closed to the public and may not be visited.
