= Church and Monastery of Our Lady of Monserrate =

Church and monastery in Bahia, Brazi

- Igreja e Mosteiro de Nossa Senhora do Monte Serrat
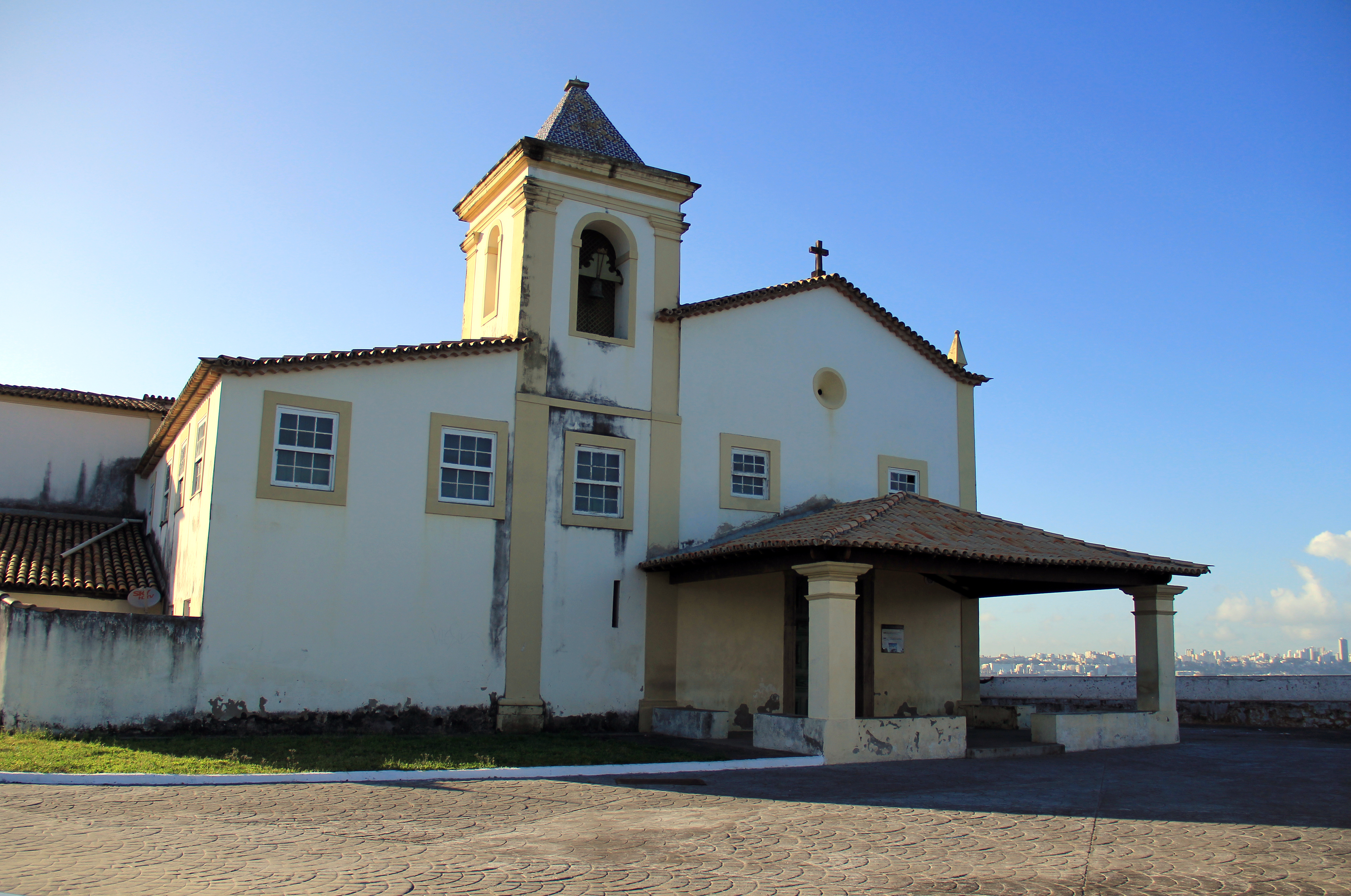
- Church and Monastery of Our Lady of Monserrate

- Location of the Church and Monastery of Our Lady of Monserrate in Brazil

Religion
- Affiliation: Catholic
- Rite: Roman
- Ownership: Roman Catholic Archdiocese of São Salvador da Bahia

Location
- Municipality: Salvador
- State: Bahia
- Country: Brazil
- Interactive map of Church and Monastery of Our Lady of Monserrate
- Coordinates: 12.92881°S 38.51928°W

Architecture
- Established: 16th century

National Historic Heritage of Brazil
- Designated: 1938
- Reference no.: 574

The Church and Monastery of Our Lady of Monserrate (Portuguese: Igreja e Mosteiro de Nossa Senhora do Monte Serrat) is a 16th-century Roman Catholic church and monastery located in Salvador, Bahia, Brazil. The church and monastery are dedicated to Our Lady of Monserrate and belongs to the Roman Catholic Archdiocese of São Salvador da Bahia. It is located 200 metres (660 ft) from the Fort of Monserrate (Fortim de Nossa Senhora de Monserrate) on a rock on the Itapagipe Peninsula. The date of construction of the structure is disputed; it dates to the 16th century, and has seen numerous alterations. The church was built either by the Spanish, or by the group that constructed the Garcia d'Ávila Tower House. Its design, along with that of numerous rural chapels of Bahia, is attributed to the Italian architect Baccio da Filicaia (1565-1628). The church interior was once lined entirely with 16th-century azulejos; now only a single strip of the tiles remain. The church was listed as a historic structure by the National Historic and Artistic Heritage Institute in 1958. It and the Chapel of Our Lady of the Ladder are the only remaining 16th-century chapels in Salvador.

== History ==
The Fort and Church of Our Lady of Monserrate sits at a strategic location north of the historic center of Salvador with a view over the Bay of All Saints. The site, originally called Traripe, was naturally protected by land by the small line of hills in the Itapagipe Peninsula. Additionally, its small cove has calmer waters than the Bay of All Saints. The Itapagipe Peninsula also had several waterfalls that provided fresh water and hills rich in timber. According to records in the archive of the Church and Monastery of Saint Benedict (Igreja e Mosteiro de São Bento), Tomé de Sousa (1503-1579), the first governor-general of Brazil, donated land to the Benedictines near Fort Monserrate to construct a chapel. A source dating to 1722 states that the Sanctuary of Our Lady of Mont-Serrat (Santuário da Senhora de Mont-Serrat) was founded by Spanish priests under the orders of Garcia Dias de Ávila, son of Tomé de Sousa; these fathers dedicated the chapel to Our Lady of Monserrate, the patron saint of Catalonia. A painting of São Pedro Arrependido by Eusébio de Matos (1629-1692) was located in the chapel until the 1940.

== Location ==
The Church and Monastery of Our Lady of Monserrate is located on the small, westernmost point of the Itapagipe Peninsula called Monte Serrat. The church and convent sit 100 metres (330 ft) below the fort. The chapel is surrounded by water on all three sides and accessed via a narrow road.

== Protected status ==
The Church and Monastery of Our Lady of Monserrate was listed as a historic structure by the National Institute of Historic and Artistic Heritage in 1938. Both the structure and its contents were included in the IPHAN directive under inscription number 79.

== Access ==
The church is opened to the public and may be visited.
