= Diocese of Camaçari =

Catholic ecclesiastical territory

Coordinates: 12.7006°S 38.3246°W

Diocese of Camaçari Dioecesis Camassariensis

Catholic
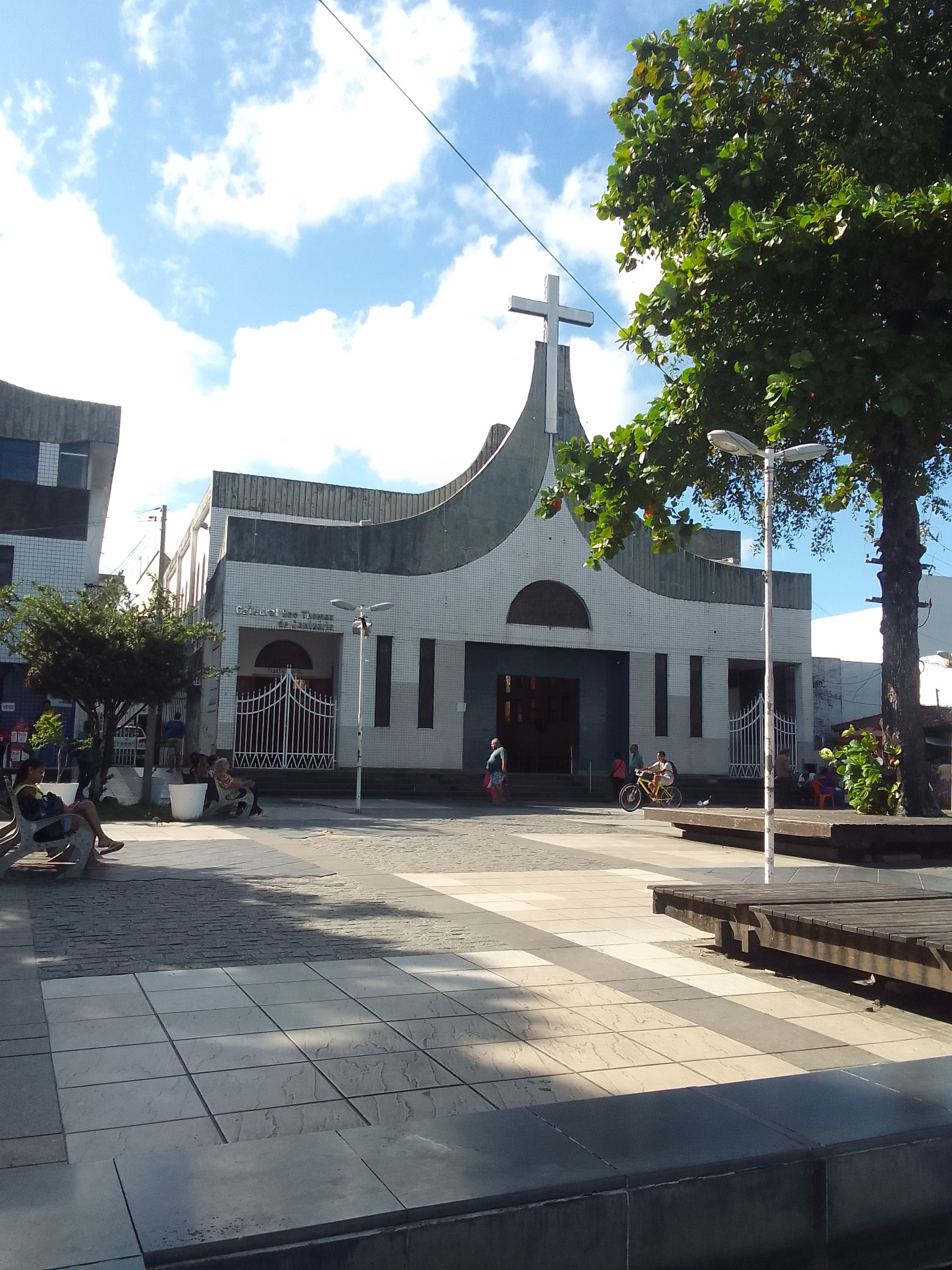
- Cathedral of São Tomás de Cantuária in Camaçari

Location
- Country: Brazil
- Ecclesiastical province: São Salvador da Bahia

Statistics
- Area: 2,382 km^{2} (920 sq mi)
- Population: Total; Catholics: (as of 2010); 708,122; 481,523 (68%)
- Parishes: 16

Information
- Denomination: Catholic Church
- Rite: Roman Rite
- Established: 15 December 2010 (15 years ago)
- Cathedral: Catedral São Tomás de Cantuária

Current leadership
- Pope: Leo XIV
- Bishop: Dirceu de Oliveira Medeiros
- Metropolitan Archbishop: Murilo Sebastião Ramos Krieger

Website
- www.diocesedecamacari.com.br

The Roman Catholic Diocese of Camaçari (Latin: Dioecesis Camassariensis) is located in the city of Camaçari, Bahia, Brazil. It is a suffragan see to the Archdiocese of São Salvador da Bahia.

== History ==
On 15 December 2010, Pope Benedict XVI established the Diocese of Camaçari from the Archdiocese of São Salvador da Bahia.

== Ordinaries ==
- João Carlos Petrini (15 Dec 2010–27 October 2021)
- Dirceu de Oliveira Medeiros (27 October 2021–)
