= Church and Hospice of Nossa Senhora da Boa Viagem =

Church in Salvador, Bahia, Brazil

Church and Hospice of Our Lady of the Good Journey
- Igreja e Hospício de Nossa Senhora da Boa Viagem
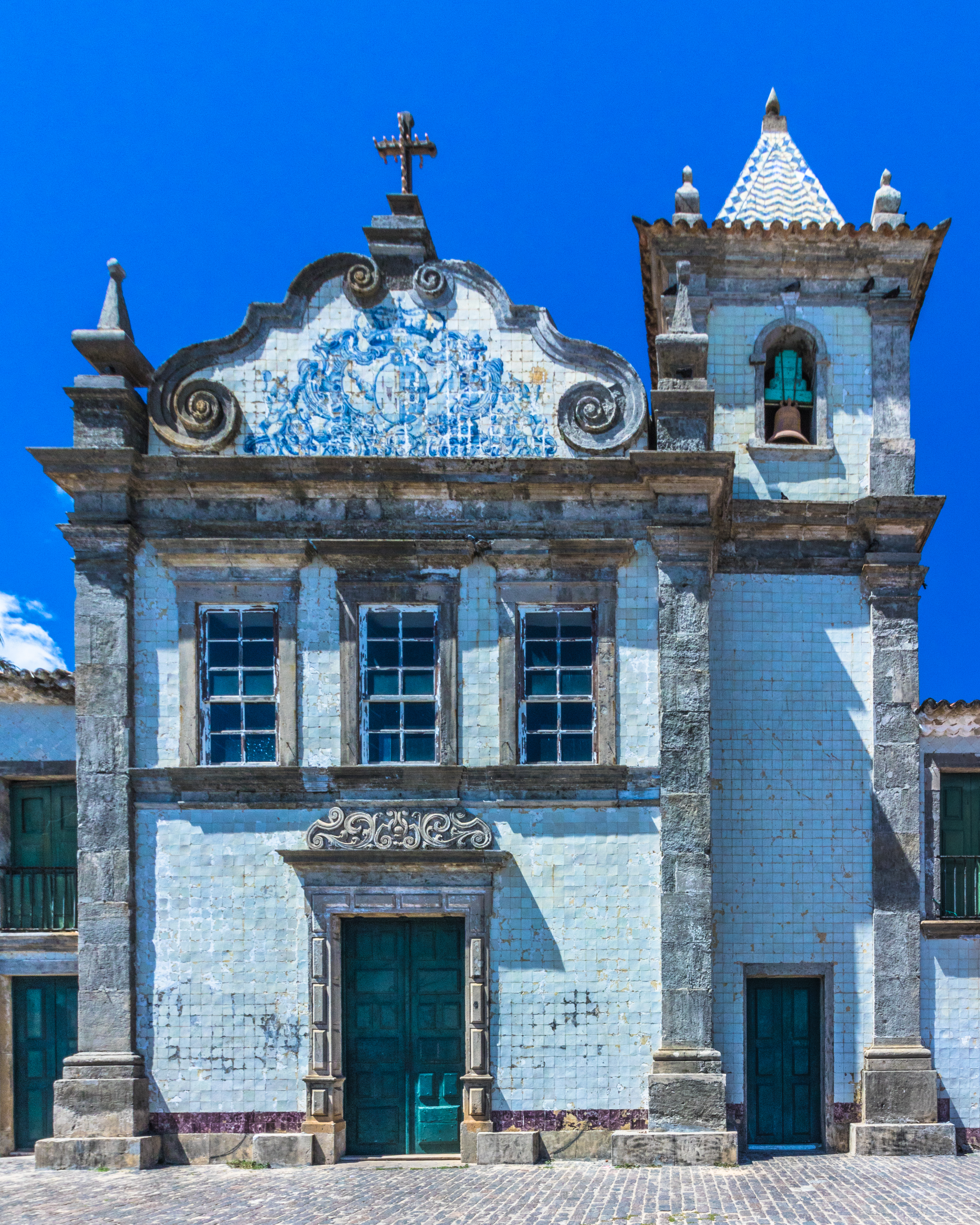
- Church and Hospice of Our Lady of the Good Journey

- Location of the Church and Hospice of Our Lady of the Good Journey in Brazil

Religion
- Affiliation: Catholic
- Rite: Roman
- Ownership: Roman Catholic Archdiocese of São Salvador da Bahia

Location
- Municipality: Salvador
- State: Bahia
- Country: Brazil
- Interactive map of Church and Hospice of Our Lady of the Good Journey
- Coordinates: 12.931352°S 38.513948°W

Architecture
- Established: 1712

National Historic Heritage of Brazil
- Designated: 122

The Church and Hospice of Our Lady of the Good Journey (Portuguese: Igreja e Hospício de Nossa Senhora da Boa Viagem) is an 18th-century Roman Catholic church located in Salvador, Bahia, Brazil. The church is dedicated to Our Lady of the Good Journey and belongs to the Roman Catholic Archdiocese of São Salvador da Bahia. It is located on the Itapagipe Peninsula and faces west directly onto the Bay of All Saints. The Church and Hospice of Our Lady of the Good Journey has a single tower with a frontispiece covered in blue and white azulejos in a zigzag pattern. It was listed as a historic structure by the National Historic and Artistic Heritage Institute (IPHAN) in 1938.

== History ==
The Church and Hospice of Our Lady of the Good Journey was built on land on the Itapagipe Peninsula donated by Lourenço Maria to the Franciscan Order in 1710. The site is a short distance from the Small Fort of Our Lady of Monserrate and faces the Bay of All Saints. The brick and mortar church structure was built in 1712; it consisted of a nave with side aisles and tribunes, a plan typical of Bahian churches of the 17th and 18th century. The walls of church were completed between 1743 and 1746. Work on interior elements of the church were completed throughout the 18th century. The main altar dates to 1720. Its authorship is unknown, but is similar in style and execution to that of the Church of São Francisco, also owned by the Franciscan Order and completed in the same period. The altar and wood interior elements of the church were damaged over time by xylophages.

=== 20th century ===
The church was greatly disfigured in the early 20th century. In a renovation between 1908 and 1912 the walls separating the nave from the side corridors were demolished and the azulejos removed. The single nave was divided into three naves. The walls were replaced by pillars made of iron tubes. The fine jacaranda altar rail, similar to those found in Bahian churches, was demolished. The floor of the nave was lowered. The five arches of the northwest façade were covered.

The National Institute of Historic and Artistic Heritage (IPHAN) carried out stabilization and conservation works after its designation as a historic structure in 1938. Stabilization work began in 1942. Worked moved to the chapel in 1944. The roof was restored beginning in 1955. The work was concluded in 1959 and the bell gable pyramid was restored in the same year.

== Structure ==
The Church and Hospice of Our Lady of the Good Journey consists of a church and hospice building. The church has a baroque-style façade with a single bell tower. An elaborate stone portal is at center with three sash windows at the choir level. The central pediment is covered in azulejos manufactured in Portugal. The belfry has a pyramid decorated in azulejos arranged in a zigzag pattern. The hospice has two floors built around a courtyard. Much of the baroque-style high altar and retable date to the early 18th century; the central elements of the retable were added in the 19th and 20th century.

The sacristy has its original set of jacaranda furniture, including a sacristy cabinet and trunks. The sacristy has a lavabo in white marble; it has dolphin motifs and a shell-shaped washbasin, similar to other lavabos in Bahia of the same period.

== Protected status ==
The Church and Hospice of Our Lady of the Good Journey was listed as a historic structure by the National Institute of Historic and Artistic Heritage (IPHAN) in 1938. Both the structure and its contents were included in the IPHAN directive under inscription number 122.

== Access ==
The church is opened to the public and may be visited.
