= Fort of Monserrate =

- Salvador, Bahia in Brazil
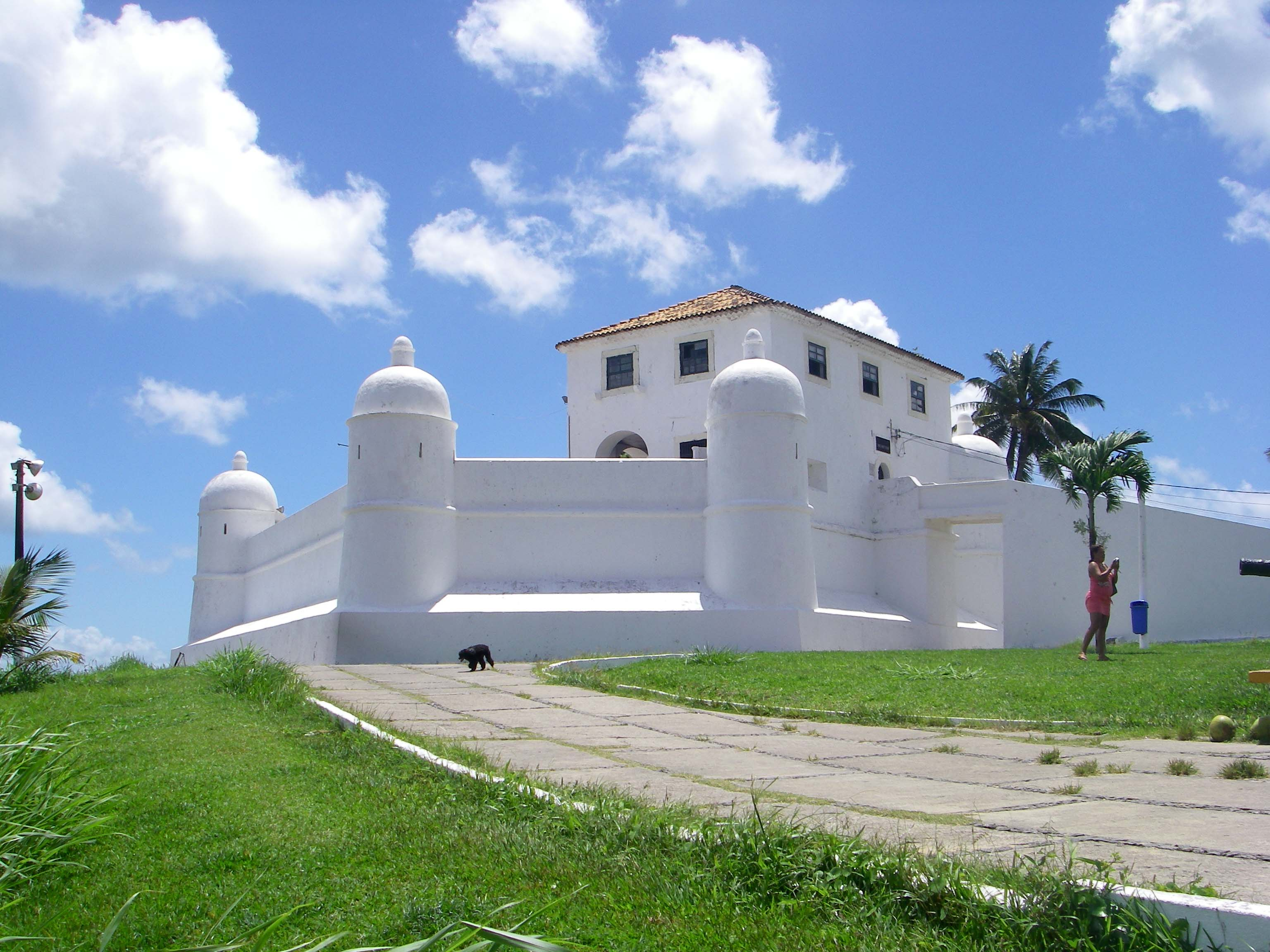
- Fort of Monserrate, Salvador, Brazil

Site information
- Type: Fort

Location
- Location of Fort of Monserrate in Brazil
- Coordinates: 12.929965°S 38.517719°W

Site history
- Built: 1500-1600s
- Materials: stone masonry

National Historic Heritage of Brazil
- Designated: 1957
- Reference no.: 551

The Fort of Monserrate (Portuguese: Fortim de Monserrate) is a military fortification located in Salvador, Bahia in Brazil. It is also known as the Small Fort of Our Lady of Monserrate (Portuguese: Fortim de Nossa Senhora de Monserrate). It was known as the Forte de São Felipe (Fort of Saint Phillip) from the time of its construction until the 19th century. The Fort of Monserrate was built between the end of the 16th century and early 17th century on the Itapagipe Peninsula. It is "one of the few Brazilian fortifications to retain its original appearance from the late 16th century." The fort is located above the Church and Monastery of Our Lady of Monserrate, one of the oldest church structures in Brazil. The fort was listed as a historic structure by the National Institute of Historic and Artistic Heritage (IPHAN) in 1938.

== History ==
The Fort of Monserrate was built as early as the Governor-General Manoel Teles Barreto, between 1583 and 1587; and 1609, when it appears in a report by Diogo de Campos Moreno. It was one of four recorded forts of the period, which included the Towers of Saint Albert (Torres de Santo Alberto), now lost; the Tower of Saint James (Torres de Santiago) in Água de Meninos, now modified into a stronghold; and the second version of the Forte de Santo Antônio da Barra. The Monserrate fort shares a common plan with the second version of the Fort of Saint Antony of Barra. Its design is attributed to Baccio de Filicaia, a native of Tuscany who served under Francisco de Sousa (1591-1602).

== Structure ==
The Fort of Monserrate is an irregular polygon-shaped structure, with circular turrets at angles covered by domes. It has curtain walls rather than bastions, which were constructed at a later period. The structure had 6 turrets, but two were demolished in the 18th century. The fort once had a drawbridge between the ramp and embankment; two barracks once flanked the entrance.

== Protected status ==
The Fort of Monserrate was listed as a historic structure by the National Institute of Historic and Artistic Heritage (IPHAN) in 1957.

== Access ==
The fort of the is open to the public and may be visited.

== See also ==
- Military history of Brazil
