= Church of Nossa Senhora da Penha, Salvador =

Roman Catholic church in Bahia, Brazil

Church of Our Lady of Penha
- Igreja de Nossa Senhora da Penha
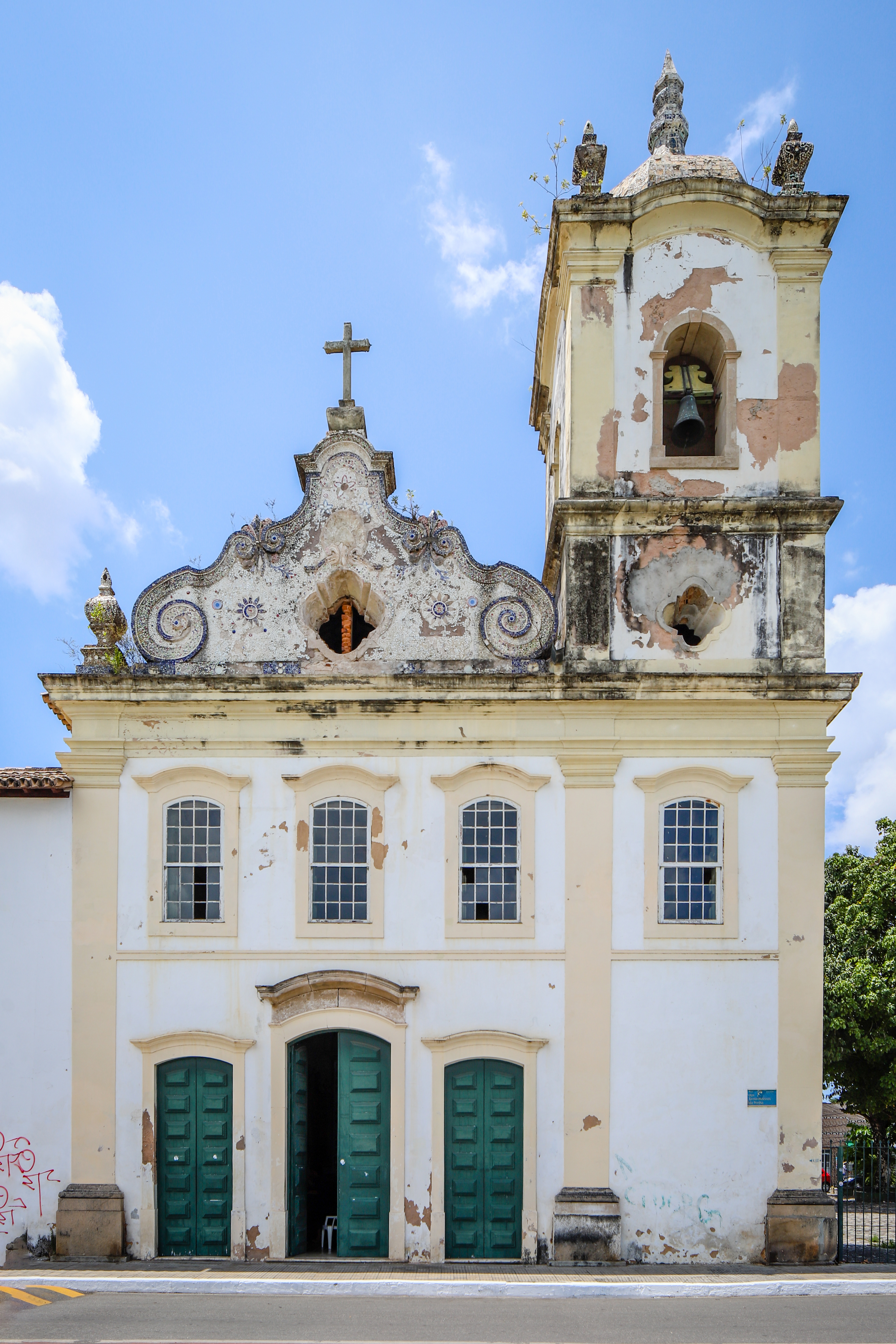
- Facade of Church of Our Lady of Penha

- Location of the Church of Our Lady of Penha in Brazil

Religion
- Affiliation: Catholic
- Rite: Roman Rite
- Ownership: Roman Catholic Archdiocese of São Salvador da Bahia

Location
- Municipality: Salvador
- State: Bahia
- Country: Brazil
- Interactive map of Church of Our Lady of Penha
- Coordinates: 12.909539°S 38.496552°W

Architecture
- Completed: 1742

National Historic Heritage of Brazil
- Designated: 1941
- Reference no.: 276

The Church of Our Lady of Penha (Portuguese: Igreja de Nossa Senhora da Penha, also Igreja de Nossa Senhora da Penha da Itapagipe and Nossa Senhora da Penha de França) is an 18th-century Roman Catholic church in Salvador, Bahia, Brazil. The church is located in the Ribeira neighborhood and constructed in 1742 as an extension of the Summer Palace of the Archbishop of the Roman Catholic Archdiocese of São Salvador da Bahia. The church sits at the end of the Itapagipe Peninsula and faces the Bay of All Saints. The Church of Our Lady of Penha was listed as a historic structure by the National Historic and Artistic Heritage Institute in 1941.

== History ==
It was constructed in 1742 by the José Botelho de Matos, Archbishop of Roman Catholic Archdiocese of São Salvador da Bahia as an extension of his summer home. The church was left to the Archdiocese after the death of de Matos in 1767. It was used by various Catholic brotherhoods between 1813 and 1916 and is now property of the Archdiocese.

== Location ==
The Church of Our Lady of Penha is located at the northernmost tip of the Itapagipe Peninsula and faces the sea. Unlike the churches in or near the historic center of Salvador, it is surrounded by beaches, a residential neighborhood, and streets lined with tamarind trees.

== Structure ==
The exterior of the Church of Our Lady of Penha is in stone and brick masonry. The façade is in the Roccoco style and decorated with pieces of azulejos with a single tower. The main body of the façade has a large Roccoco-style pediment which resembles that of the Church of the Old Seminary in Belém da Cachoeira.

=== Interior ===
The interior of the church is typical of Bahian churches of the 18th century, with lateral corridors, but lacking tribunes.

The interior of the church has three Baroque-style altars. The design of the central altar resembles those of the Basilica of the Immaculate Conception and the Santa Casa de Misericórdia. The ceiling of the nave is coffered and has elaborate painting by an unknown artist. The church and Summer Palace are connected by a distinctive loggia, or roofed gallery. The palace is structured around a central hall.

== Protected status ==
The Church of Our Lady of Penha was listed as a historic structure by the National Historic and Artistic Heritage Institute in 1941. The heritage designation includes both the church and the Summer Palace of the Archbishop. The structures were registered under the Book of Historical Works, Inscription 276-T and Book of Fine Arts, Inscription fl 53. Both directives are dated September 25, 1941.

== Access ==
The church is open to the public and may be visited.

== Gallery ==
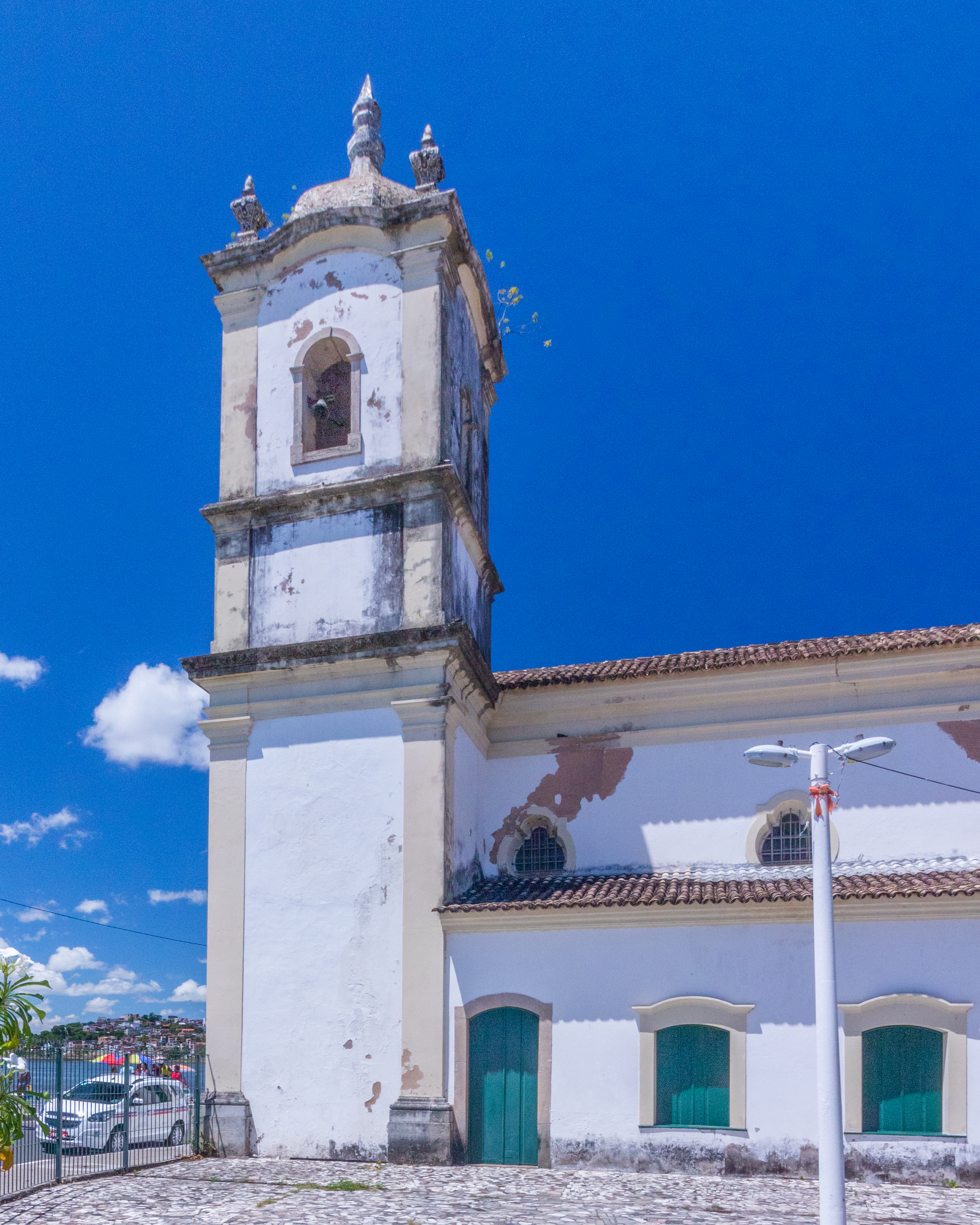

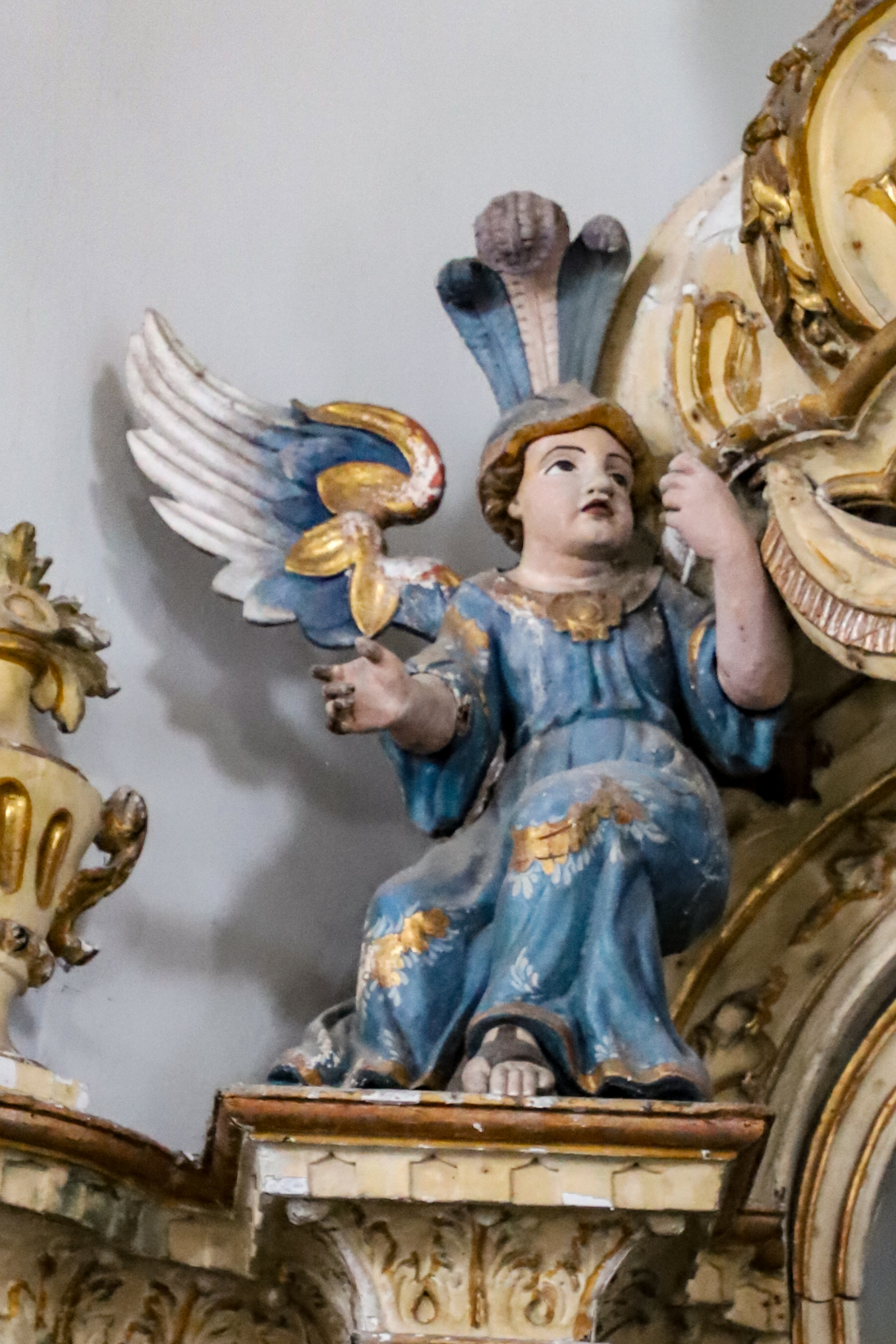

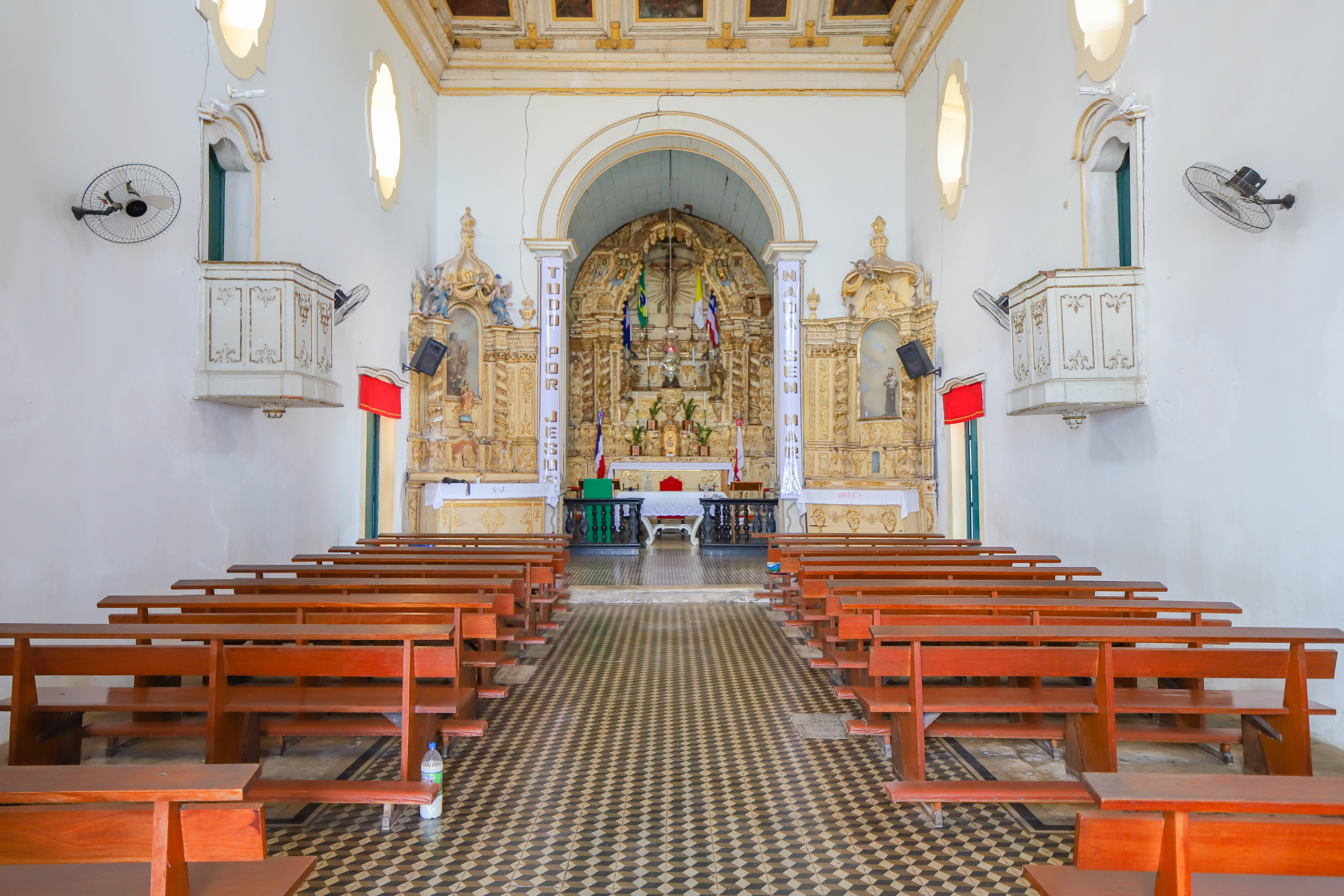

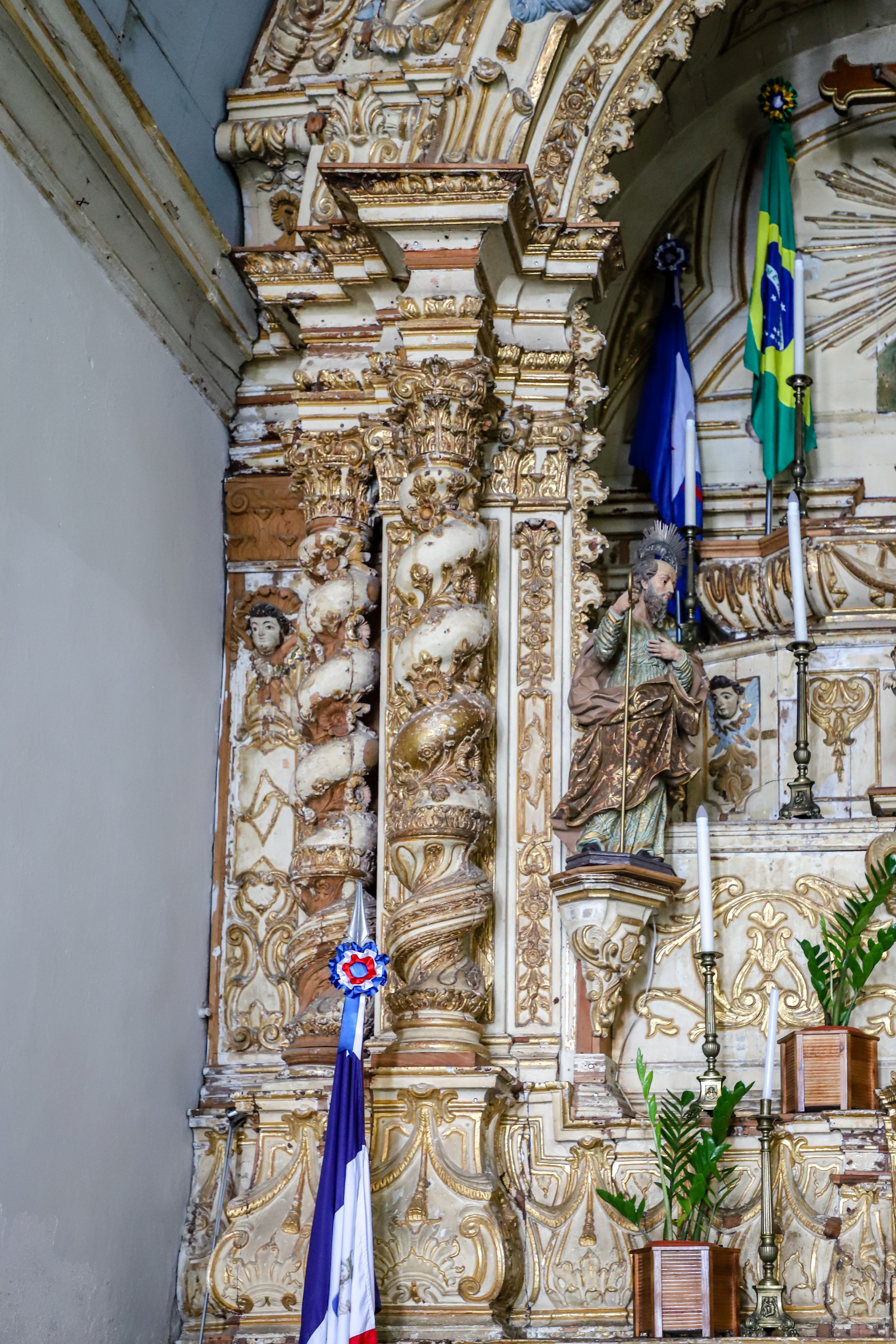

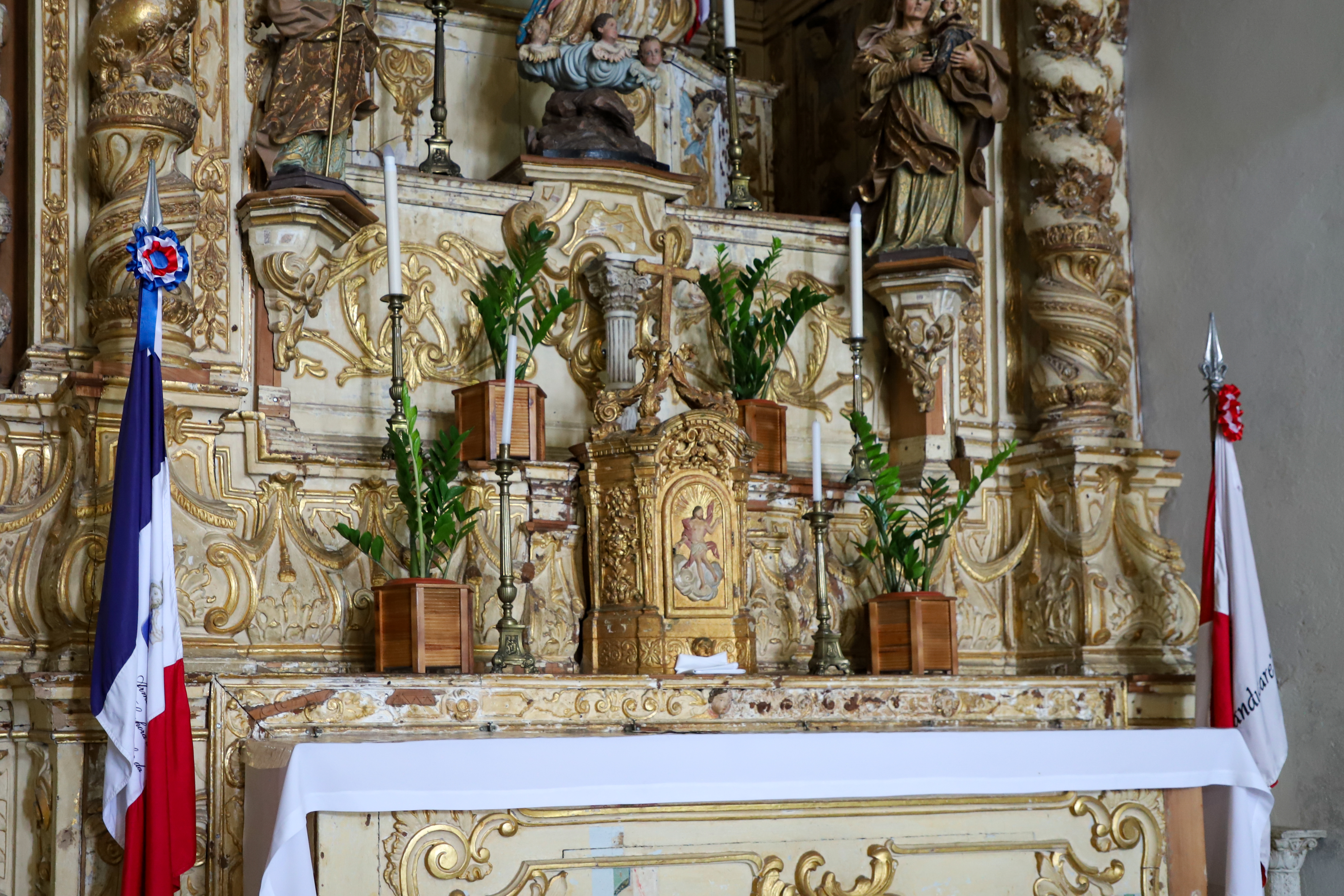

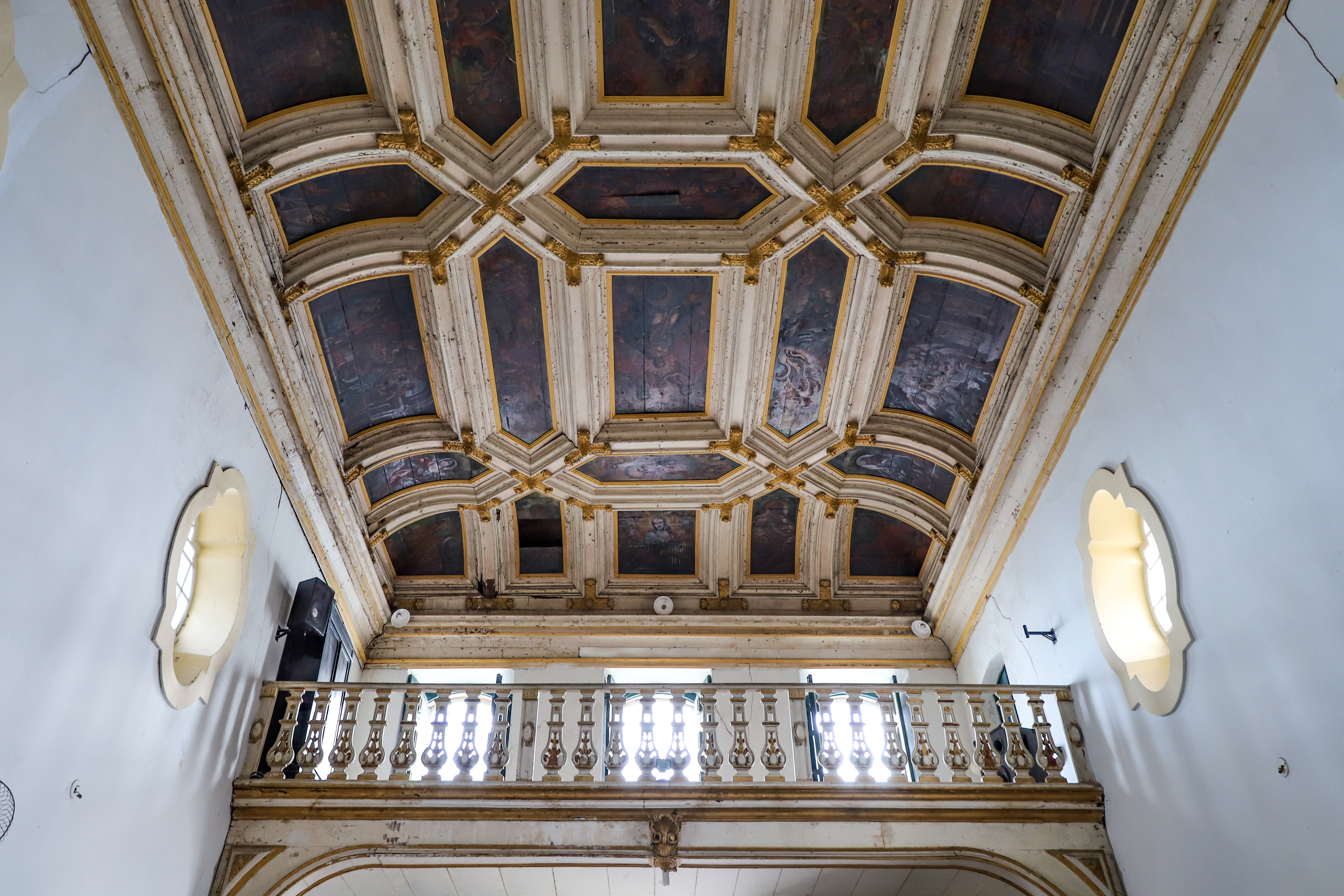

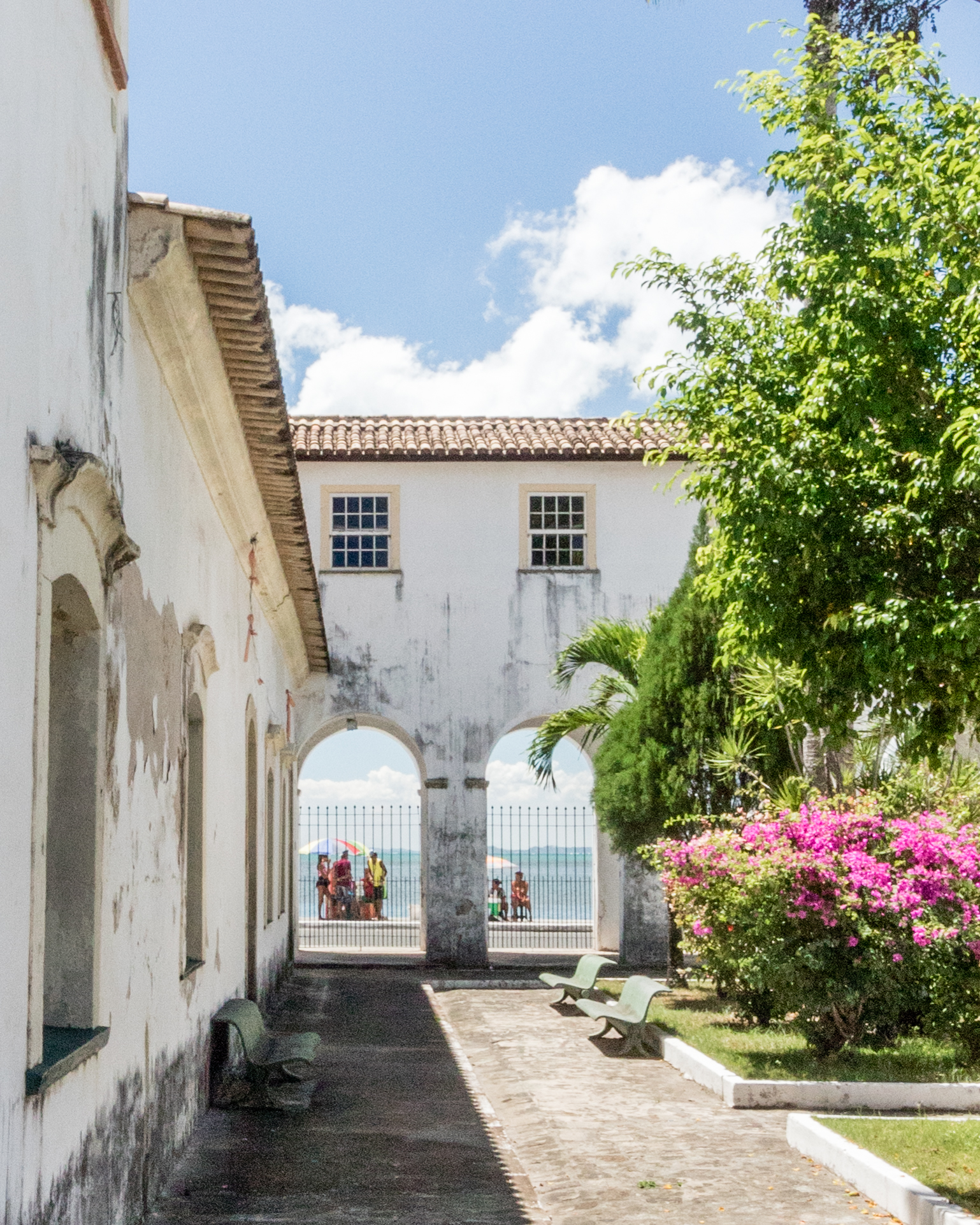

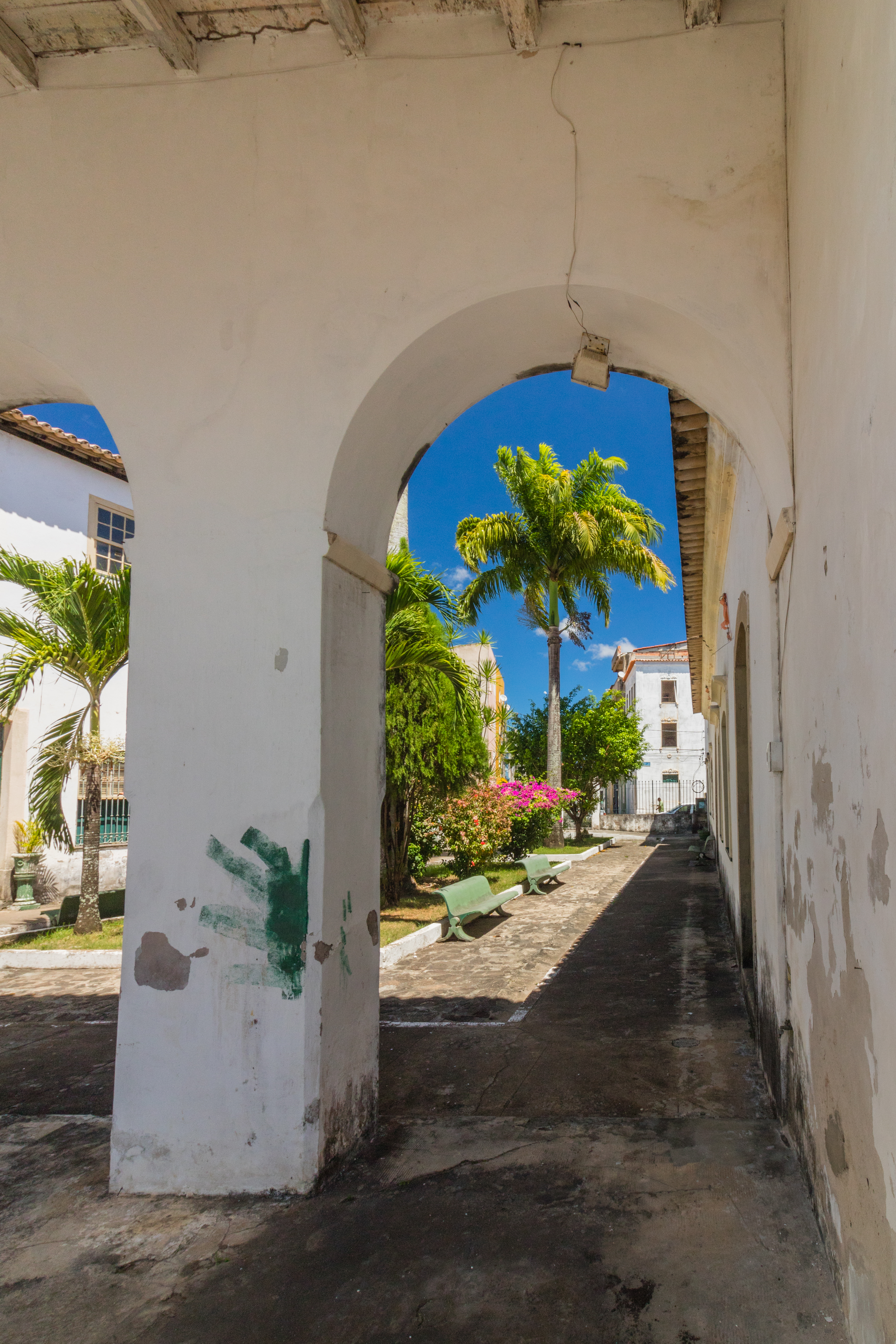
