= CEIFAR =

== CEIFAR – Centro de Integração Familiar ==
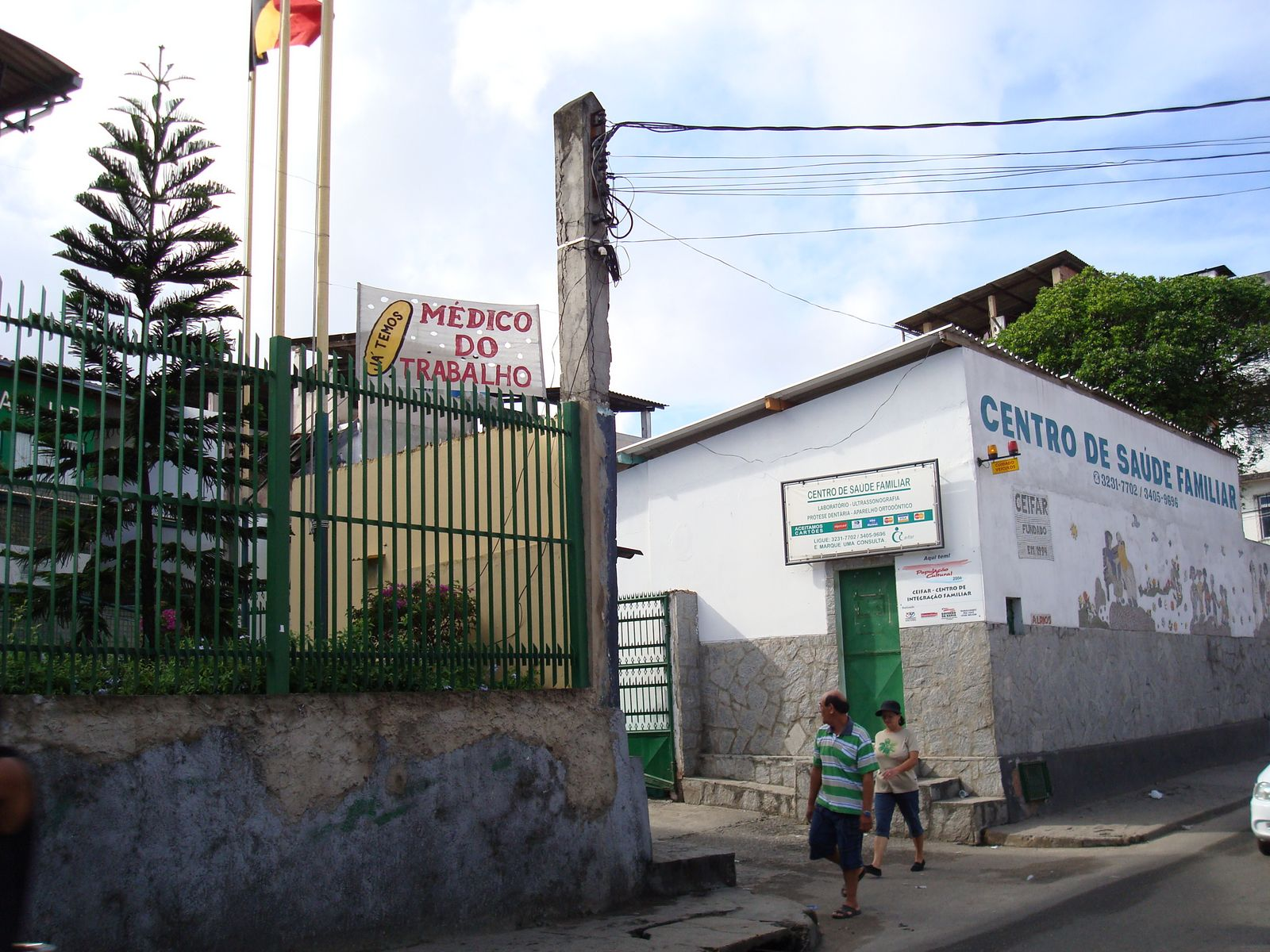
The front gate of CEIFAR in Salvador, Brazil.

(Center for Family Integration) is a non-profit community project in Salvador, Bahia, Brazil in the neighborhood of Tancredo Neves. Its purpose is to better the community through education, counseling, activities and health care.

== History ==
Simonne Alice Debouk, a Belgian Nurse, came to Brazil in 1993 to work with adults and young adults in education and family planning. She began in the neighborhood of Trancredo Neves with family visits to promote family planning, playful-educational activities, and teaching families in the community about sexuality and improving their living conditions.

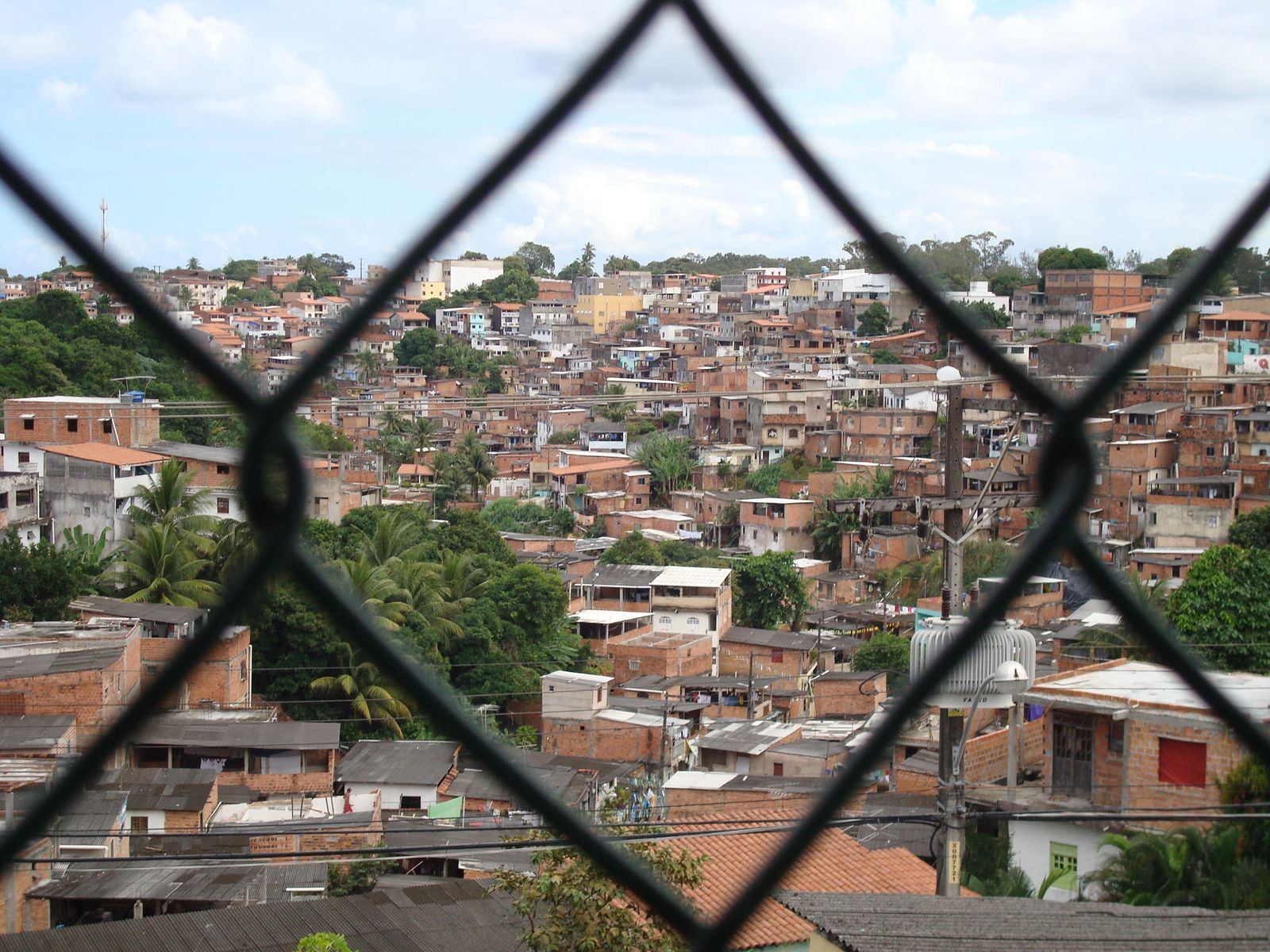
Tancredo Neves. Picture taken through the fence at CEIFAR.

CEIFAR was founded by Simonne in 1994 with help from friends in Luxembourg and Belgium. Working in the community, it became apparent that the lack of family planning was only one of the problems the community faced. The public education system struggled to give the children the education they needed to pull themselves out of poverty. In 1995 CEIFAR started a program of complimentary education through art, culture, and sport activities. Accessible healthcare was also a big concern for Simonne and the people in the community. In 2002 CEIFAR started a center for health on the CEIFAR site. The health center provides doctors visits, dental and orthodonture work at low cost to the people in the community. In 2005 they began a program of education for children of 3 to 6 years old and now have activities and classes for children of all ages.

== School ==
In the public school system in Salvador children go to school either in the morning or afternoon versus all day like many schools in the United States. This allows more children to attend the public schools. Children are required to attend school and some local governments in Brazil offer incentives to the families if their children attend school every day.

CEIFAR has complementary education. They also offer morning and afternoon classes but expect the child to attend public school as well as CEIFAR. If the child studies in the public school in the morning, they can study in CEIFAR in the afternoon. The children can get help with their homework from public school or often have more lessons at CEIFAR. CEIFAR also offers educational activities such as a music program, ceramics, Karate, Capoeira (a Brazilian Martial art), and sewing. Many students learn skills that help them support their families upon graduating from CEIFAR. For example, a child who advances through the Karate program can get the qualifications and experience needed to become a Karate instructor.

English classes are offered at CEIFAR for the children taught by volunteers from other countries such as the United States and England. Community English classes are sometimes offered for little or no cost for adults in the community as well. The volunteers are placed by Cross-Cultural Solutions.

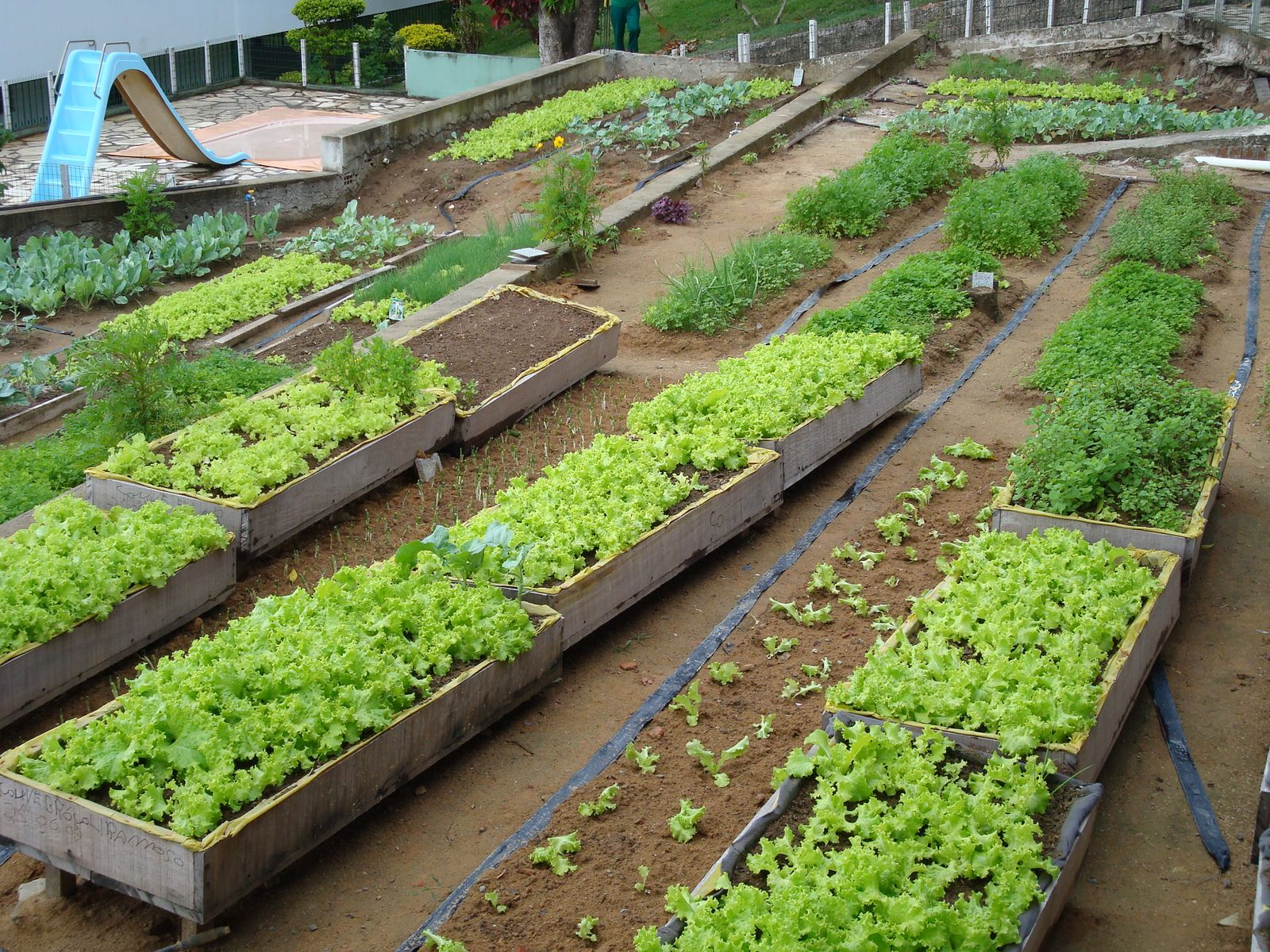
The garden at CEIFAR

CEIFAR also provides food for the children. The children are served lunch Monday through Thursday at CEIFAR. CEIFAR is closed on Fridays for teacher planning. This insures that the children have at least one meal a day. In Brazil the largest meal of the day is lunch. Students are also required to wash their hands and brush their teeth after eating.

CEIFAR receives help from the government who provides some of the food served.

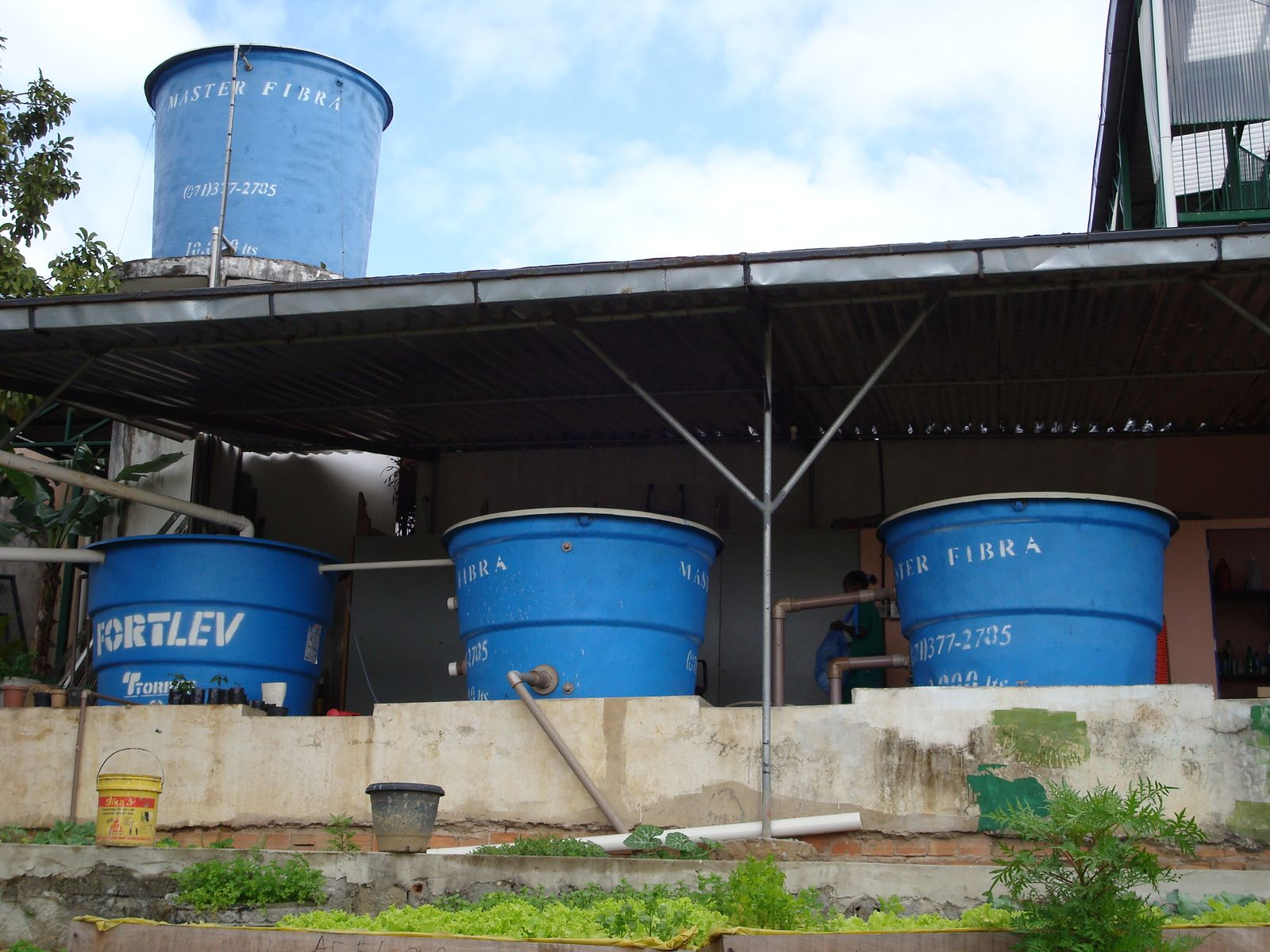
The rain water collection system at CEIFAR

Other food is purchased or grown in the garden at CEIFAR. They also have a rainwater collection and treatment system to provide water for the school.

CEIFAR staff members periodically do home visits to talk with the families and do what they can to not only help the children but the families as well. CEIFAR has a social worker who among other things, helps the children and families in the community obtain birth certificates and other necessary documents that weren’t obtained at birth. This is a common problem in the poorer areas in Salvador.

== Health Center ==
The Health Center at CEIFAR is a medical clinic that also offers pediatrics, gynecology, ophthalmology, speech therapy, psychological counseling, and dentistry. The services are offered at low cost to the community.
