= Novo Triunfo =

Municipality of Bahia, Brazil

Coordinates: 10°19′01″S 38°24′21″W

- Municipality
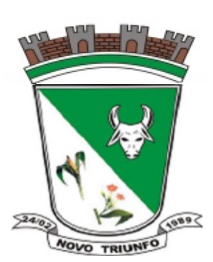
- Flag Coat of arms
- Interactive map of Novo Triunfo
- Country: Brazil
- Region: Nordeste
- State: Bahia

Population (2020)
  - Total: 15,443
- Time zone: UTC−3 (BRT)

Novo Triunfo is a municipality in the state of Bahia in the North-East region of Brazil.

== See also ==
- List of municipalities in Bahia
