= Our Lady of the Rosary =

Marian title

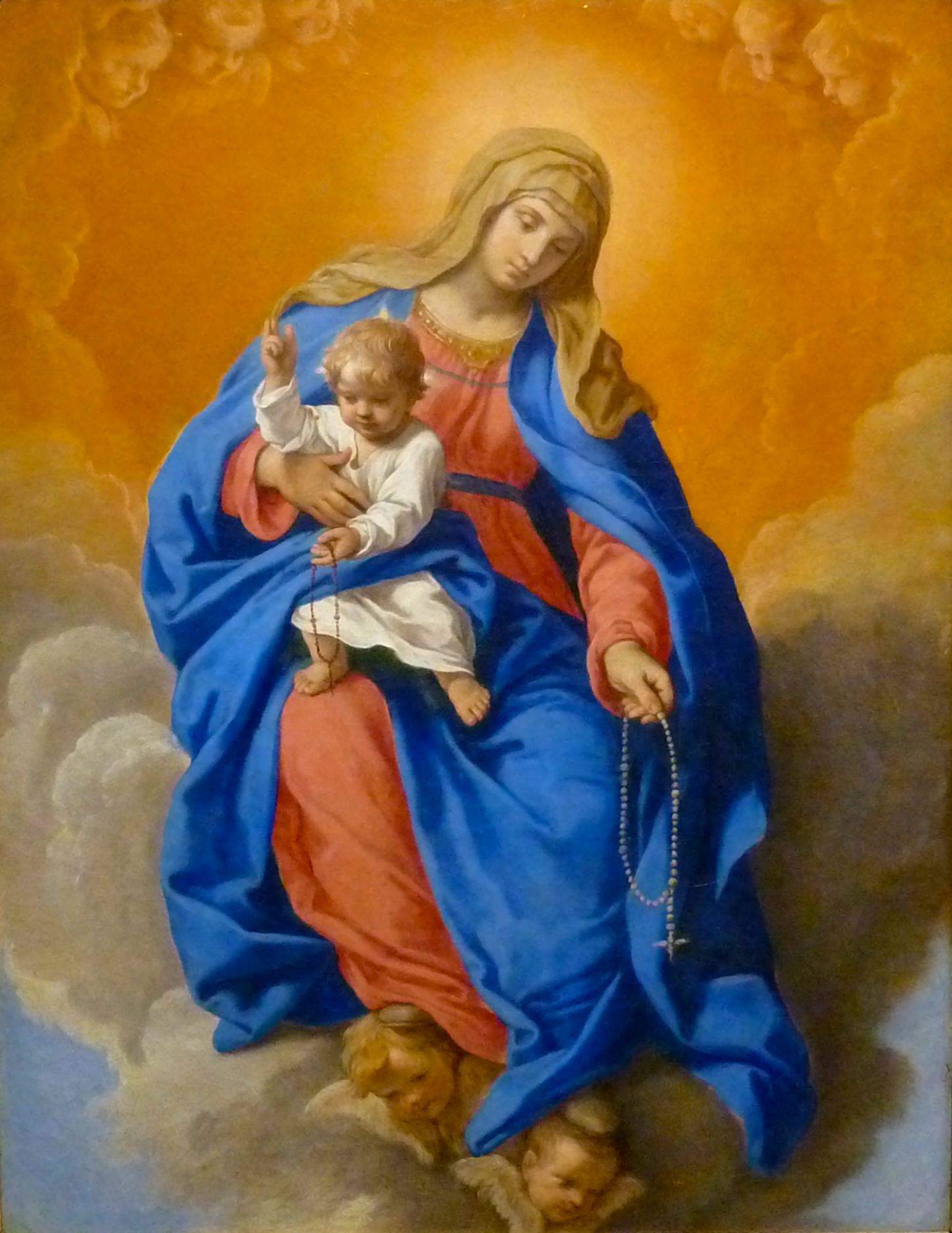
- Venerated in: Catholic Church; Antiochian Orthodox Church
- Major shrine: Our Lady of Victory Basilica, Basilica of Notre-Dame-des-Victoires, Paris
- Feast: 7 October
- Attributes: Infant Jesus, crown, rosary
- Patronage: Diocese of Malaga, Diocese of Toledo, Ohio, Rosario, Santa Fe, Rosario, Cavite, Diocese of San Nicolás de los Arroyos, Melilla, Trujillo, Cáceres, Colombia, Manizales, Puyo, Pastaza, North Carolina, Bohol, Guatemala, Surigao del Norte, Manila, Quezon City, Rosario, Batangas, Poro, Cebu, Estancia, Iloilo, Philippines, West Virginia, Seseña, Ontígola, Olías del Rey, Montearagón, Toledo, Lagartera, Huerta de Valdecarábanos, Brenes, Palma Cuata, Zacatecas Lima, Peru, Hortolândia, São Paulo
- Tradition or genre: Marian apparition

Our Lady of the Holy Rosary (Latin: Nostra Domina de Sacratissimi Rosarii) is a celebrated Marian title of the Blessed Virgin Mary venerated in many Catholic countries. The Feast of Our Lady of the Holy Rosary, formerly known as Feast of Our Lady of Victory is celebrated on 7 October in the General Roman Calendar. 7 October is the anniversary of the decisive victory of the combined fleet of the Holy League of 1571 over the Ottoman Navy at the Battle of Lepanto.

In the Western Rite Vicariate of the Antiochian Orthodox Church, the feast is optionally celebrated on 7 October, under the title The Holy Rosary of the Blessed Virgin Mary.

== Our Lady of the Rosary ==
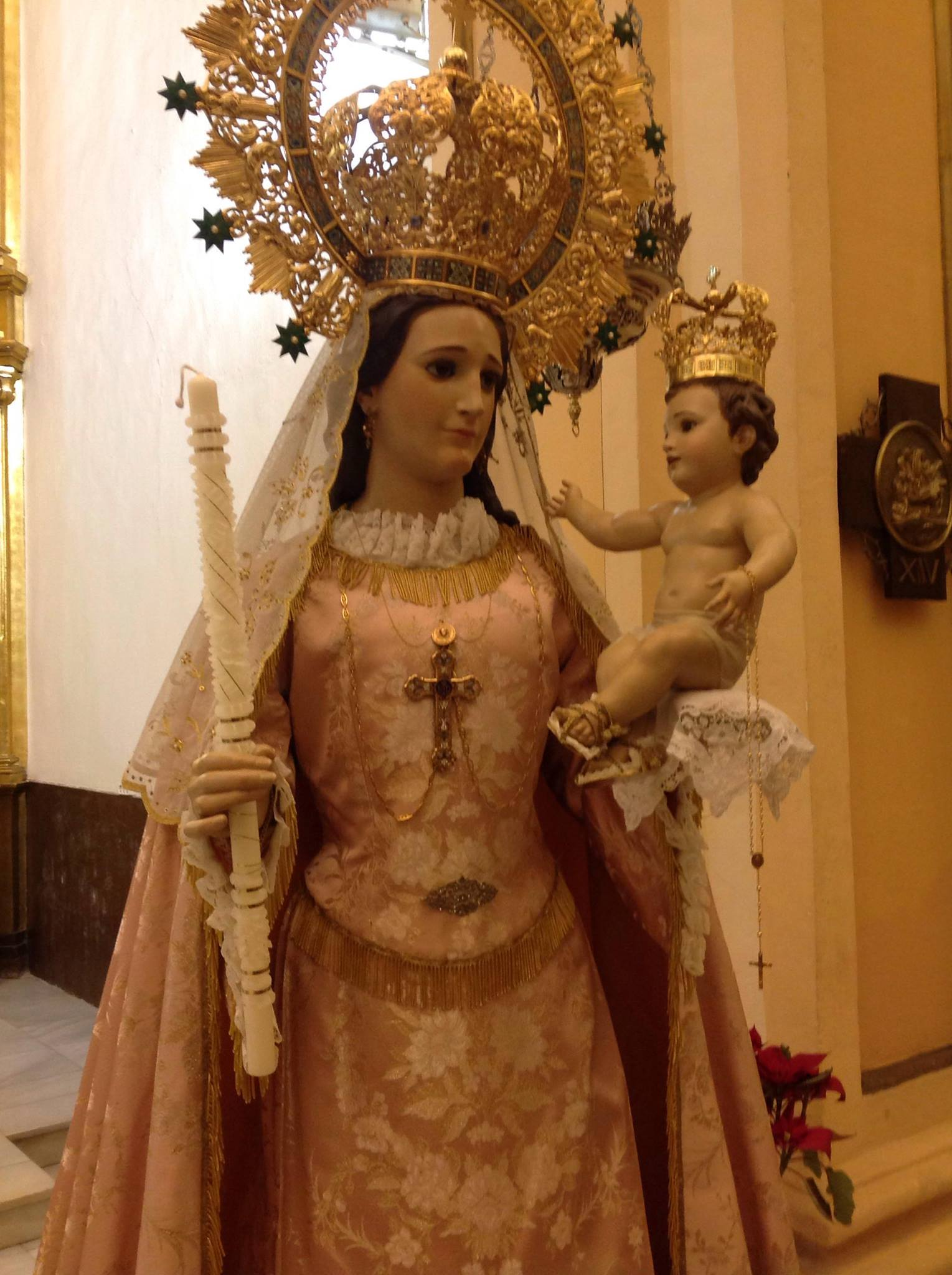
Image of Our Lady of the Rosary of Bullas

According to Dominican tradition, in 1206, Dominic de Guzmán was at the Monastery of Our Lady of Prouille, in France, attempting to convert the Albigensians back to the Catholic faith. The young priest had little success until one day he received a vision of the Blessed Virgin, who gave him the Rosary as a tool against heretics.

The story of Dominic's vision was recorded by Alanus de Rupe, a 15th-century Dominican friar who is credited with promoting the Rosary among the faithful in Europe. This traditional origin for the Rosary was generally accepted, including by many popes, until the 17th century, when the Bollandists concluded that the account originated with the account recorded by Alanus, two hundred years after Dominic's death. However, several popes after the 17th century, like Pope Leo XIII and Pope Pius XI, continued to attribute its origin to Dominic in official documents such as encyclicals.

== Our Lady of Victory ==
Mary had been honored in the West under the title "Our Lady of Victory" from at least the thirteenth century. Simon de Montfort, 5th Earl of Leicester built the first shrine dedicated to Our Lady of Victory in thanks for the Catholic victory over the Albigensians at the Battle of Muret on September 12, 1213. In thanksgiving for victory at the Battle of Bouvines in July 1214, Philip Augustus of France founded the Abbey of Notre Dame de la Victoire, between Senlis and Mont l'Evêque.

In the East, the title "Our Lady of Victory" is even older. The feast of Our Lady of Victory, on February 25, commemorates the deliverance of the city of Constantinople "from the siege of the Saracens by the aid of the Blessed Virgin, A.D. 621."

== Feast day ==
=== Background ===
In 1571, Pope Pius V organized a coalition of forces from Spain and smaller Christian kingdoms, republics and military orders, to rescue Christian outposts in Cyprus, particularly the Venetian outpost at Famagusta which, however, surrendered after a long siege on 1 August before the Christian forces set sail. On 7 October 1571, the Holy League, a coalition of southern European Catholic maritime states, sailed from Messina, Sicily, and met a powerful Ottoman fleet in the Battle of Lepanto. Knowing that the Christian forces were at a distinct material disadvantage, Pope Pius V called for all of Europe to pray the Rosary for victory, and led a rosary procession in Rome. Pius V instituted the feast of Our Lady of Victory in order to commemorate the victory at Lepanto, which he attributed to the Blessed Virgin Mary.

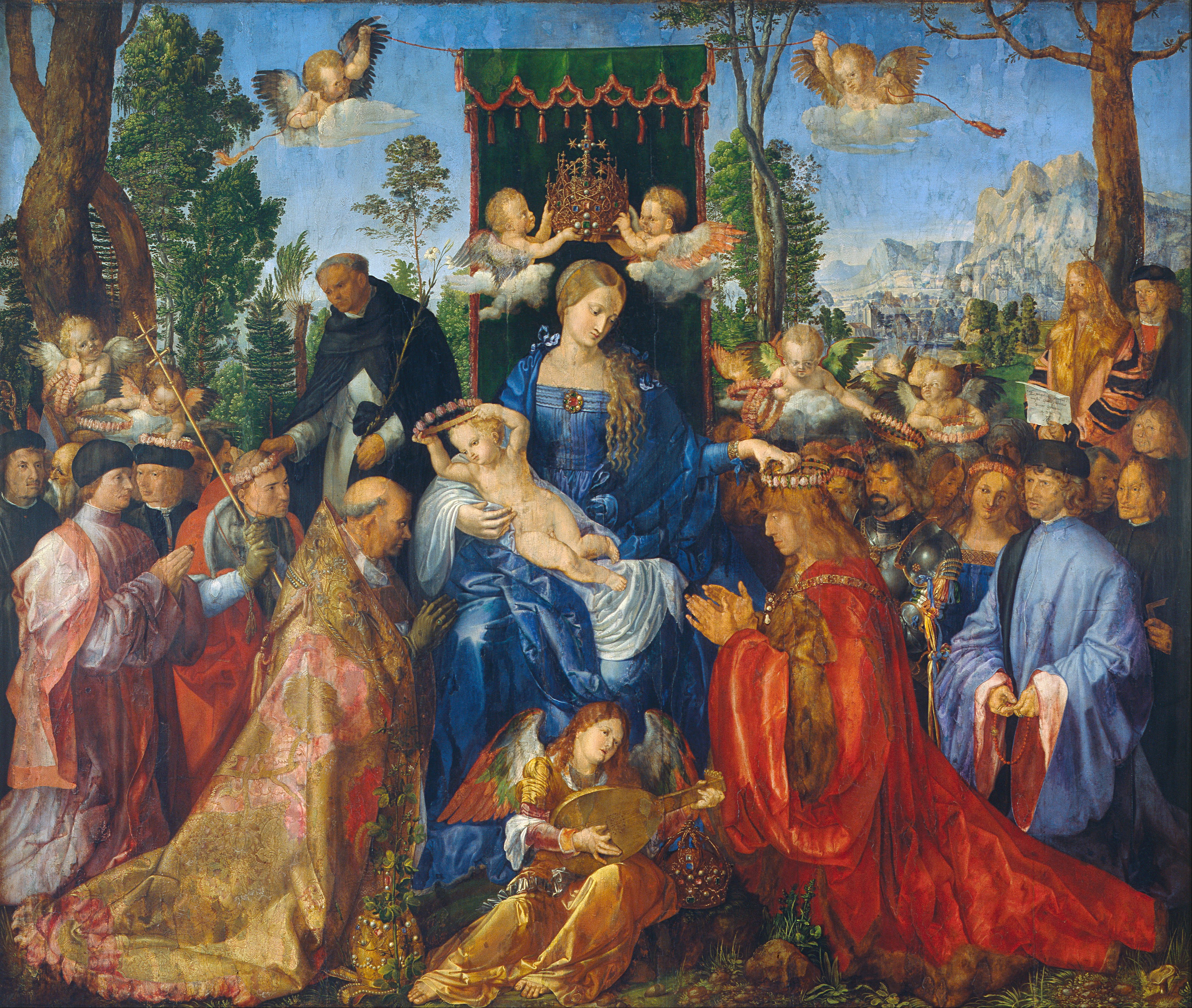
Feast of the Rosary (Rosenkranzfest), by Albrecht Dürer, 1506

After about five hours of fighting on the northern edge of the Gulf of Corinth, off western Greece, the combined navies of the Papal States, Venice and Spain managed to stop the Ottoman navy, slowing the Ottoman advance to the west and denying them access to the Atlantic Ocean and the Americas. If the Ottomans had won, there was a real possibility that an invasion of Italy could have followed so that the Ottoman sultan, already claiming to be emperor of the Romans, would have been in possession of both New and Old Rome.´ Combined with the Great Siege of Malta (1565) and the unfolding events in Morocco where the Sa'adids successfully spurned the Ottoman advances, it confined Turkish naval power to the eastern Mediterranean. Although the Ottoman Empire was able to build more ships, it never fully recovered from the loss of trained sailors and marines, and was never again the Mediterranean naval power it had become the century before when Constantinople fell.

In 1572, Pope Pius V formalized the number and content of the Mysteries of the Rosary and actively promoted its recitation.

In 1573, Pope Gregory XIII changed the name of the feast into Feast of the Most Holy Rosary of the Blessed Virgin Mary, to be celebrated on the first Sunday of October. The Dominican friar, Juan Lopez, in his 1584 book on the Rosary, states that the feast of the Rosary was offered "in memory and in perpetual gratitude of the miraculous victory that the Lord gave to his Christian people that day against the Turkish armada".

In 1671, the observance of this festival was extended by Clement X to the whole of Spain, and somewhat later Clement XI, after the victory over the Turks gained by Prince Eugene in the Battle of Petrovaradin on 5 August 1716 (the feast of Our Lady of the Snows), commanded the feast of the Rosary to be celebrated by the universal church.

Leo XIII raised the feast to the rank of a double of the second class and added to the Litany of Loreto the invocation "Queen of the Most Holy Rosary". On this feast, in every church in which the Rosary confraternity has been duly erected, a plenary indulgence toties quoties is granted upon certain conditions to all who visit therein the Rosary chapel or statue of Our Lady. This has been called the "Portiuncula" of the Rosary. During his pontificate, Leo XIII issued eleven encyclicals about Our Lady of the Rosary and its feast.

Pius X, in 1913, changed the date to 7 October, as part of his effort to restore celebration of the liturgy of the Sundays. In 1960, under Pope John XXIII, it is listed under the title Feast of the Blessed Virgin Mary of the Rosary; and under the 1969 liturgical reforms of Pope Paul VI, Our Lady of the Rosary is mentioned as a obligatory memorial.

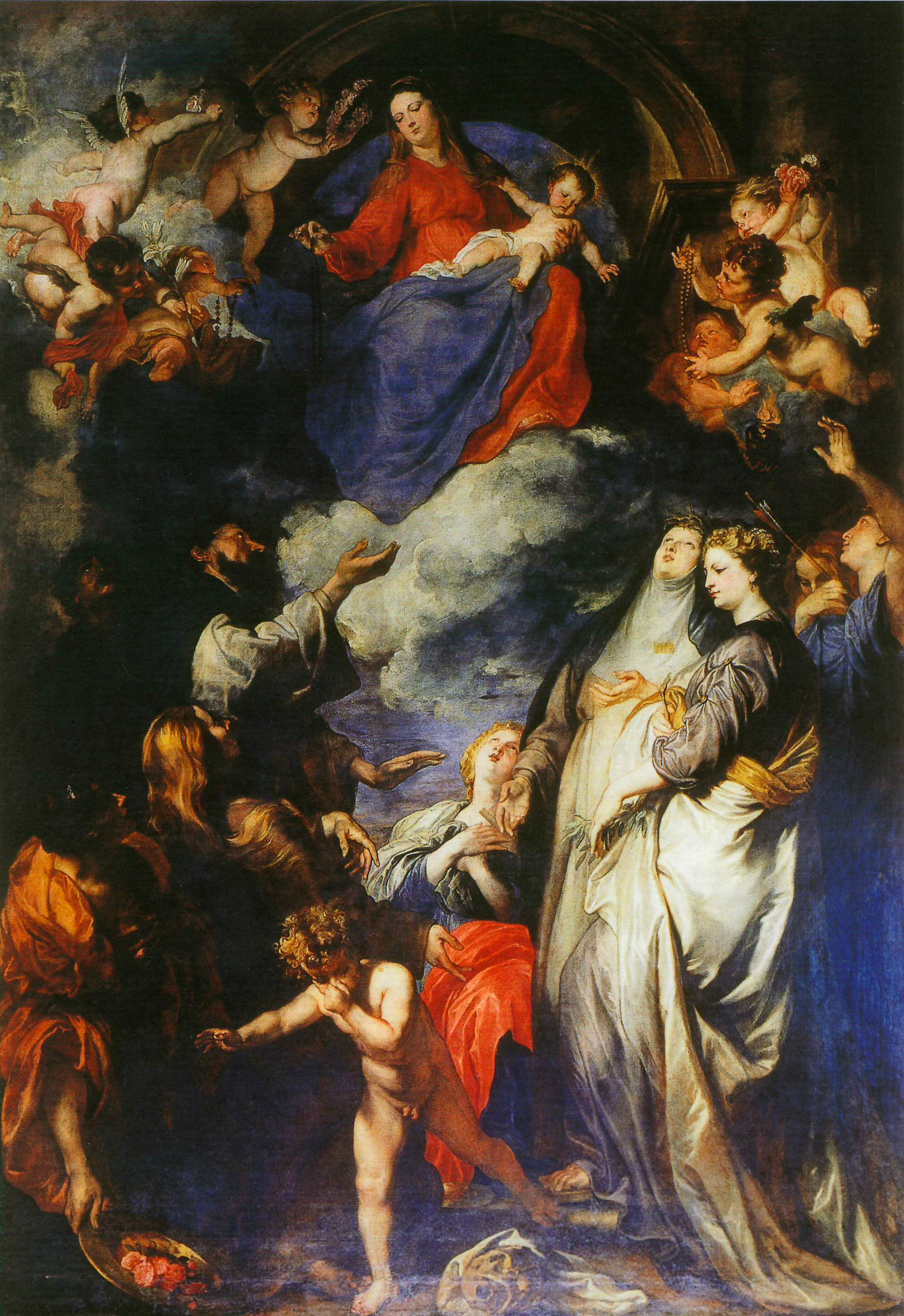
Our Lady of the Rosary by Anthony van Dyck, between 1623 and 1624

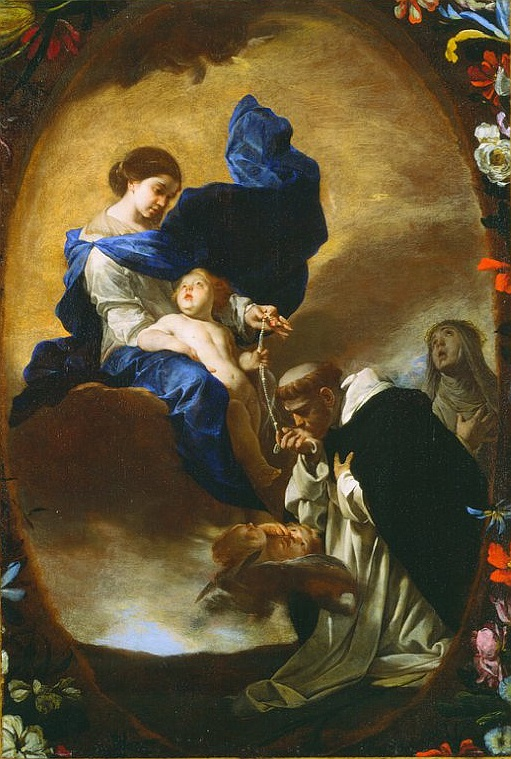
The Vision of Saint Dominic by Bernardo Cavallino, 1640

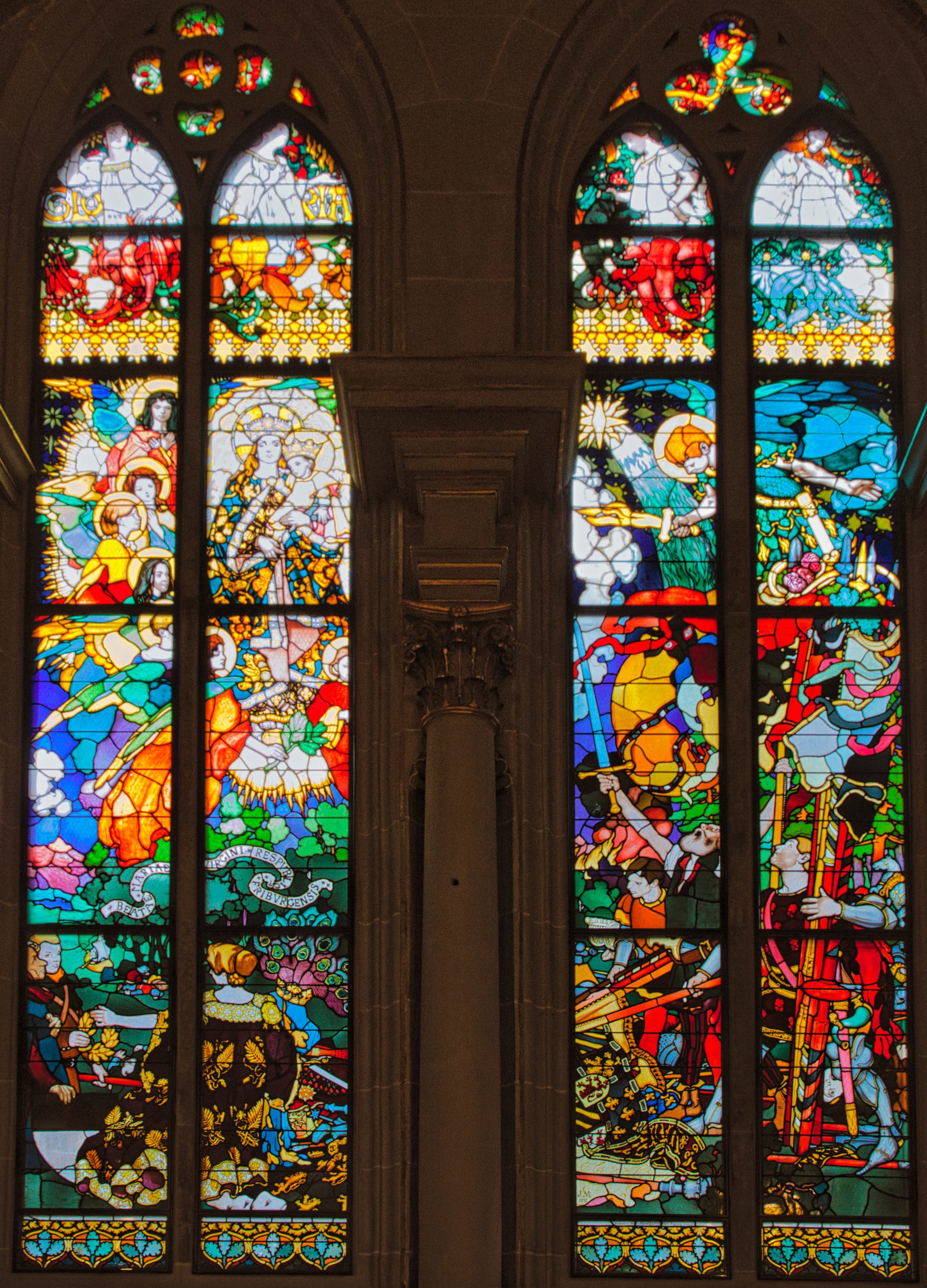
Our Lady of Victory by Józef Mehoffer, 1896–1897, stained glass window in Fribourg Cathedral

== Patronage ==
Our Lady of the Rosary is the patron saint of several places around the world. The Diocese of Malaga, Spain (which celebrates her patronage on September 8), and the Spanish cities of Melilla and Trujillo celebrate Our Lady of Victory as their patron.

María del Rosario is a common female Spanish name (colloquially abbreviated to Rosario or Charo). Rosario can also be used as a male first name, particularly in Italian and Rosaria as the female version.

=== Churches dedicated to Our Lady of the Rosary ===
- Diocesan Shrine and Parish of Our Lady of the Holy Rosary in the Diocese of Antipolo in Cardona, Rizal
- The Basilica of Our Lady of the Rosary in Fátima, Portugal – part of the Sanctuary of Fátima
- The Pontifical Shrine of the Blessed Virgin of the Rosary of Pompei
- The Chapel of the Rosario in Puebla City, Mexico – built between 1531 and 1690
- The cathedral for the Diocese of Toledo in Toledo, Ohio
- The Our Lady of the Rosary Church in Windsor, Ontario (Diocese of London, Ontario), closed 2007
- The Cathedral of Our Lady of the Rosary in Duluth, Minnesota
- The Our Lady of the Rosary Cathedral in San Bernardino, California
- The St. Peter's Church, Our Lady of the Rosary in Manhattan, New York City – began in 1883 as the Mission of Our Lady of the Rosary for the protection of Irish immigrant girls
- The Basilica of Our Lady of the Rosary and Convent of Santo Domingo in Buenos Aires, Argentina –
- Our Lady of the Rosary Cathedral in Jashpur, Chhattisgarh, India – the second largest church in Asia, accommodating 10,000 worshippers
- Basilica of Our Lady of the Holy Rosary, Karumathampatti shrine in Coimbatore Tamil Nadu, India
- The Metropolitan Cathedral of Our Lady of the Holy Rosary in Vancouver, British Columbia
- Our Lady of the Rosary church in the Archdiocese of New Orleans – first mass held was held on Christmas of 1907
- The Our Lady of the Rosary and St Dominic church in the Archdiocese of Westminster in north London
- Our Lady of the Rosary church in Greenville, South Carolina, within the Diocese of Charleston
- Our Lady of the Rosary Cathedral in Mangalore, India
- Shuangshu Church, also known as Our Lady of the Rosary Church in Tianjin, China
- Our Lady of the Rosary Parish in Rosario, Batangas, Philippines
- Most Holy Rosary Parish in the Archdiocese of Lipa in Padre Garcia, Batangas, Philippines
- Queen of the Most Holy Rosary Parish in Estancia, Iloilo, in the Archdiocese of Jaro, Philippines
- Our Lady of the Most Holy Rosary, Queen of the Caracol, Rosario, Cavite
- Church of Our Lady of the Rosary and the Guardian Angels, Sallins, Ireland
- Church of Our Lady of the Rosary in Hanoi, Vietnam
- Mary Queen of the Holy Rosary in the Diocese of Lexington, Kentucky
- Holy Rosary Church, Kundapur in the Diocese of Udupi in India
- Holy Rosary Church in San Antonio, Texas, United States

=== Churches named for Our Lady of Victory ===
Although the title Our Lady of Victory has been superseded to some extent by that of Our Lady of the Rosary, the former is still in popular use at a number of parishes and schools.

- Notre-Dame-des-Victoires, Paris is an historic Marian shrine and place of pilgrimage. Augustinian friars built it between 1629 and 1740 with financial assistance from Louis XIII, who named the church Notre-Dame des Victoires in gratitude for the victory of French forces over the Huguenots at the Siege of La Rochelle (1627–28).
- The Church of Our Lady Victorious (Kostel Panny Marie Vítězné) in Prague houses the 16th-century Infant Jesus of Prague.
- Notre-Dame-des-Victoires, San Francisco was founded in 1856 to serve French Catholic immigrants to California. In 1887, Pope Leo XIII signed the decree putting l'Eglise Notre Dame des Victoires in charge of the Marists, and making it a French National Church. The church was rebuilt in 1915 after the earthquake and fire of 1906, and was declared an historical landmark in 1984.
- Our Lady of Victory National Shrine and Basilica is located in Lackawanna, New York.
- Our Lady of Victory Cathedral in the Diocese of Victoria in Texas.
- Our Lady of Victory Church, also known as the War Memorial Church, in the financial district of Manhattan, New York City, was dedicated to Our Lady of Victory by Francis Cardinal Spellman, archbishop of New York and apostolic vicar for the U.S. Armed Forces on June 23, 1947 " ... in Thanksgiving for Victory won by our valiant dead, our soldiers' blood, our country’s tears, shed to defend men’s rights and win back men’s hearts to God."
- Derham Hall and Our Lady of Victory Chapel at St. Catherine University in St. Paul, Minnesota, is named for Our Lady of Victory, and is listed on the National Register of Historic Places.
- St. Mary of Victories Hungarian Catholic Church is located in St. Louis, Missouri. St. Mary's was built in 1843, and is the second oldest Catholic Church within the city limits. Originally home to German immigrants, the parish became home to the Hungarian Community in 1957 and is the official Hungarian Church for the Archdiocese of St. Louis.
- Our Lady of Victories, Kensington is located in London. The Church was at one point the Pro-Cathedral in the Archdiocese of Westminster, and was heavily bombed in World War II.
- The Chapel of Our Lady of Victory, an abandoned 18th-century chapel located in São Francisco do Conde, Bahia, Brazil
- Our Lady of Victory Parish, is located in Victorias City
- Our Lady of Victory Church, a 19th-century church in Hebei District, Tianjin, China. It is one of the oldest churches in the city.
- Our Lady of Victory Church, a 20th-century cathedral in Xiashan District, Zhanjiang, China.

== See also ==
- Our Lady of the Rosary of Chiquinquirá
- Churches named for the Rosary
- Holy Rosary Church
- Shrine of the Virgin of the Rosary of Pompei
