= Veríssimo de Souza Freitas =

Afro-Brazilian painter (1758–1806)

Veríssimo de Freitas
- Born: Salvador, Bahia, Portuguese Colony of Brazil
- Died: 1806; Salvador, Bahia, Portuguese Colony of Brazil
- Known for: Painting
- Movement: Portuguese colonial Baroque

Veríssimo de Souza Freitas (ca. 1758–1806) was an Afro-Brazilian painter of Colonial Brazil, noted for his paintings in various churches in Salvador and the immediate interior of Bahia region. He was an apprentice, assistant, and employee of Joaquim José da Rocha (1737-1807). De Freitas' mastery of trompe-l'œil painting follows in the tradition of Da Rocha. They worked simultaneously on numerous paintings, leading to confusion about authorship of some works. Freitas' ceiling paintings feature trompe l'oeil paintings with columns and arches, which continue to a central medallion with a painted sky.

== Noted works ==
- Glorificação da Imaculada Conceição pela Santíssima Trindade, the large-scale painting of the ceiling of the Church and Convent of Our Lady of the Conception of Lapa (Igreja e Convento de Nossa Senhora da Conceição da Lapa)
- Eight Panels of Augustinian Saints, Church and Convent of Our Lady of the Palm (Igreja e Convento de Nossa Senhora da Palma, ca. 1785). The central medallion of the painting has the Immaculate Conception at center, the Holy Trinity above, and six young nuns below. De Freitas likely assisted José Joaquim da Rocha in other painting in the church, notably the massive painting of nave ceiling
- Paintings in the Convent of Bom Jesus dos Perdões and Chapel of Mercy (Recolhimento do Bom Jesus dos Perdões e Capela da Piedade)
- Santo Antônio de Lisboa, Church and Monastery of Saint Benedict (Igreja e Mosteiro de São Bento)
- Painting of the nave ceiling, Church and Convent of Saint Antony and Chapel of the Third Order in São Francisco do Conde, Bahia
