= Chapel of Our Lady of Victory =

Church in São Francisco do Conde, Bahia, Brazil

- Capela de Nossa Senhora do Vencimento
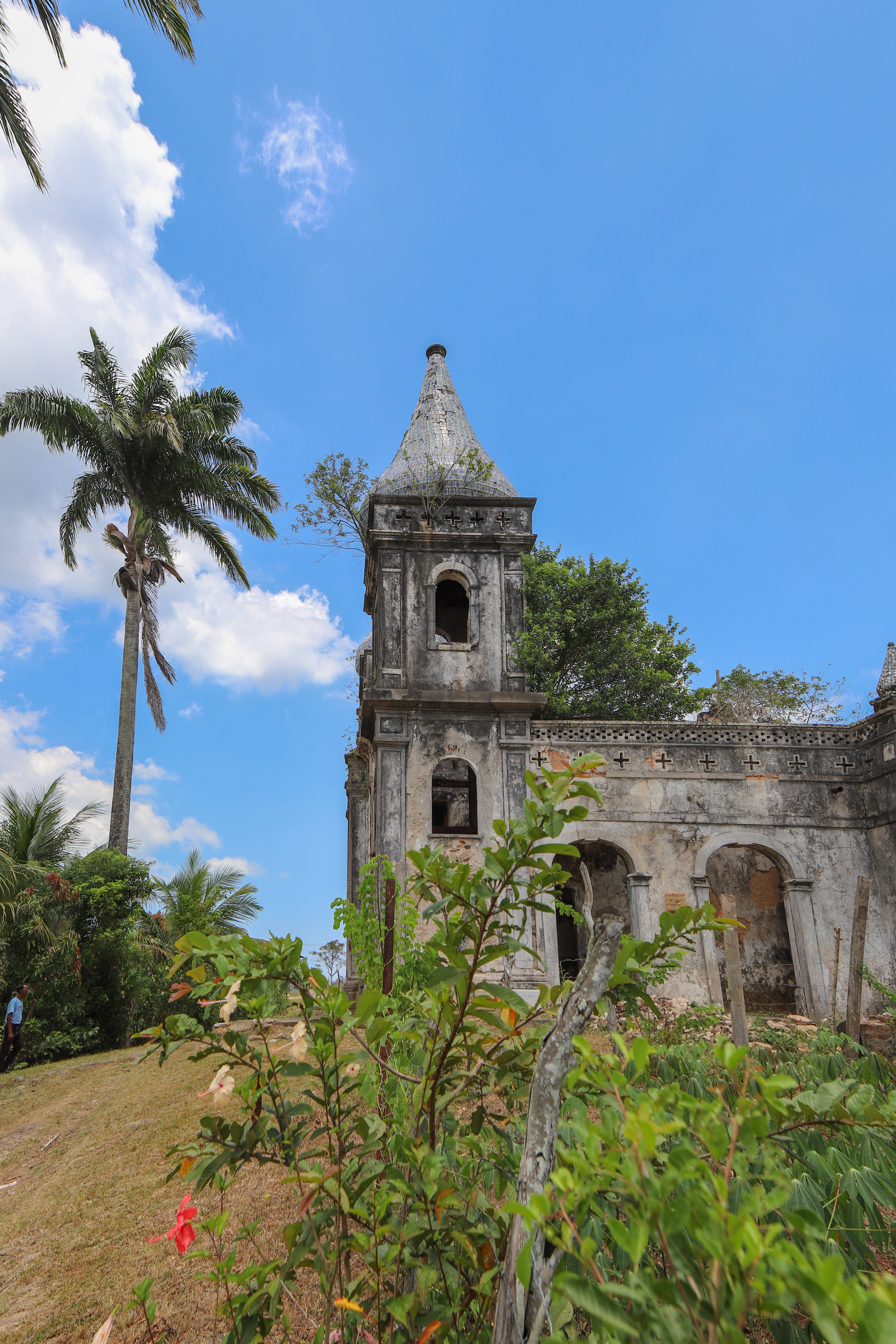

- Location of the Chapel of Our Lady of Victory in Brazil

Religion
- Affiliation: Catholic
- Rite: Roman

Location
- Municipality: São Francisco do Conde
- State: Bahia
- Country: Brazil
- Coordinates: 12.649238°S 38.603018°W

Architecture
- Type: Baroque, rococo
- Established: 1700s
- Interior area: 279 square metres (3,000 ft^{2})

The Chapel of Our Lady of Victory (Portuguese: Capela de Nossa Senhora do Vencimento) is an abandoned 18th-century Roman Catholic chapel located in São Francisco do Conde, Bahia, Brazil. It was dedicated to Our Lady of Victory. The chapel was once adjacent to the plantation house of the Engenho do Paramirim. The chapel covers 279 square metres (3,000 ft^{2}) and is noted for its large, Byzantine-style domes covered in blue and white industrial tiles imported from Portugal. The chapel is in ruins and its images and baptismal font were first taken to Usina Cinco Rios, a sugarcane factory; the factory is now in ruins and the location of the chapel contents are unknown.

== History ==
The Paramirim Sugar Plantation was established in the mid-18th century by Frutuoso Vicente Viana, also the owner of the Madruga plantation in present-day São Francisco do Conde. The construction of the chapel dates to at least 1757, when Vigário Miguel Teixeira Pinto reported on the chapel as part of his report on the freguesia of Nossa Senhora do Monte do Recôncavo. The chapel was built by the owner of the Paramirim Sugar Plantation, who owned other plantations and properties in the interior Recôncavo region of Bahia. The chapel was built in the 18th century in the Baroque style. The movement to replace Baroque architectural elements with the Neoclassical spread from Salvador to the interior of Bahia in the 19th century; this was reflected in the renovation of the plantation house, now lost, and the Neoclassical design of the chapel altar.

Imperial palms (Roystonea oleracea) were introduced from France via Portugal in the early 19th century. The imported seeds were expensive, and presence of the palms among the rolling hills indicated the power and prestige of both plantations and some religious institutions, especially in the Recôncavo. Two of the palms from the period remain in front of the chapel.

The Paramirim plantation was sold to the owner of the Usina Cinco Rios, a sugarcane processing factory in São Sebastião do Passé, in 1956. A baptismal font in lioz marble and images of the church were relocated to Usina Cinco Rios in this period. The factory is now in ruins and the location of the baptismal font and images is unknown.

== Location ==
The Chapel of Our Lady of Victory sits on a bluff in the Mataripe district of São Francisco do Conde, at the highest elevation in the district. The ruins of the plantation house are located adjacent to the west facade of the structure, and the former workers quarters are located to the east. A French-style garden was constructed near the chapel and plantation house in the early 19th century; it is now lost. Imperial palms are located to the left and right of the facade.

== Structure ==
The Chapel of Our Lady of Victory is built of mixed masonry with two towers on either side of the facade. The towers are topped by distinctive tiled Byzantine-style domes, a style unique among Bahian churches and chapels. The tiles on the domes were industrially produced in Portugal; they have a blue floral geometric design at center on a white background. Semi-oval openings are placed on all four sides of the belfries of both towers. The chapel lacks windows at the choir level, which are instead placed on the two towers. Cross-shaped openings are placed in the tower at the base of the domes. Each of the sacristies, located to the left and right of the nave, had two portals with arches spanning the length of the chapel.

The Rococo-style facade was added when the chapel was renovated in the 19th century. It is composed of stucco and has complex design elements across the entire surface. An archivolt above the portal has three small relief plaques with an anchor, cross, and heart in each. A relief of an eight-pointed star is located between the portal and pediment with a shell design at its base. A large relief of a dove, as a symbol of the Holy Spirit, is prominently placed within the archivolt. The doors have three pilasters to either side; the first has a long diamond pattern with a rosette at center, the second has a relief of brickwork, and the third has the design of a simple column.

=== Interior ===
The interior of the chapel has a nave, chancel, two sacristies on either side of the nave, arched side galleries, and an ossuary. The nave and chancel are of equal width; the chancel is accessed via a large marble slab, now broken. Both the nave and chancel had marble floors. The nave flooring is in a black and white square and triangular pattern. The ceiling of the nave is flat, while that of the chancel is vaulted. The nave and chancel are separated by a chancel arch. The walls of the nave and chancel were lined with semi-industrial azulejos. The chapel once had a choir at the rear of the nave; a single wooden beam is the only remnant of the choir. A pulpit was located to the left of the nave that was accessed via a small staircase in the left-hand sacristy. Both the pulpit and it staircase are now missing, but its stone volute pediment, once painted blue, remains. A window with a wooden shutter with ornate lattice-work once connected the right sacristy to the chancel; it is now missing.

The high altar was designed in the Neoclassical style and is composed of stucco. It was painted green and has a floral pattern in relief. The altar had a large niche at center that once housed an image of Our Lady of Victory. Oval-shaped oculi are placed to the left and right of the high altar; the left of the chancel had a door to the ossuary, and the right of the chancel opened to the right-side sacristy. The lavabo dated to the 18th century and was composed of lioz limestone and the baptismal font was of Carrara marble, all imported from Portugal. The lavabo and baptismal fonts are now lost.

== Condition ==
The chapel is now in an advanced state of ruin; the portals and windows are missing, the roof of the sacristy has collapsed, and all interior elements have been removed. The plantation house of the Paramirim Plantation is entirely in ruins.

== Protected status ==
The Chapel of Our Lady of Victory lacks municipal, state, or federal protection. It is recognized as a heritage site of Portuguese history by the Calouste Gulbenkian Foundation.
