= Church and Convent of Saint Antony and Chapel of the Third Order =

Church and convent in Bahia, Brazil

- Igreja e Convento de Santo António e Capela da Ordem Terceira
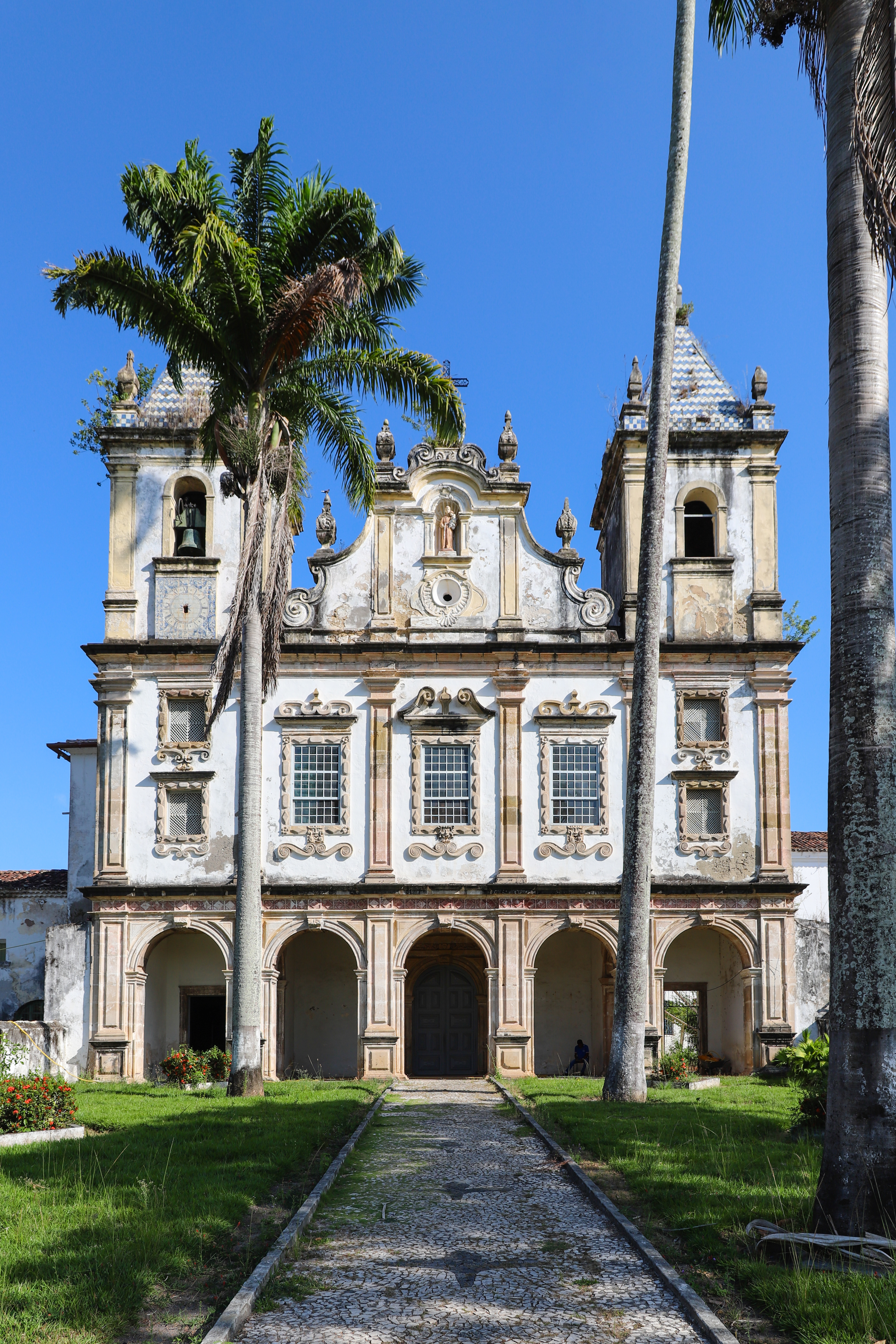
- Church and Convent of Saint Antony and Chapel of the Third Order, São Francisco do Conde, Brazil

- Location of the Church and Convent of Saint Antony and Chapel of the Third Order in Brazil

Religion
- Affiliation: Catholic
- Rite: Roman
- Ownership: Roman Catholic Archdiocese of São Salvador da Bahia
- Patron: Saint Anthony

Location
- Municipality: São Francisco do Conde
- State: Bahia
- Country: Brazil
- Interactive map of Church and Convent of Saint Antony and Chapel of the Third Order
- Coordinates: 12.630885°S 38.676015°W

Architecture
- Style: Baroque
- Established: 1633

National Historic Heritage of Brazil
- Designated: 1941
- Reference no.: 257

The Church and Convent of Saint Antony and Chapel of the Third Order (Portuguese: Igreja e Convento de Santo António e Capela da Ordem Terceira) is a 17th-century Roman Catholic church and convent located in São Francisco do Conde, Bahia, Brazil. Construction began in 1618 and was completed in 1633, 64 years before the founding of the municipality of São Francisco of the Conde in 1697. The interior of the church was renovated in 1718 and the original alters were removed, but the façade was retained. The Convent of Saint Anthony is the only religious structure in Latin America with azulejos depicting all sixteen miracles of Saint Anthony, the patron of the church and convent. The painting on the ceiling of the nave is attributed to José Joaquim da Rocha, who also painted the ceiling of Basilica of the Immaculate Conception in Salvador. It could also be the work of his student, Veríssimo de Souza Freitas.

== History ==
Gaspar dos Reis Pinto and his wife Isabel Fernandes verbally promised land to the Franciscans of Salvador in 1629 for the construction of a convent. They offered land in Real Engenho de Sergipe of the Conde de Linhares, the present-day city of São Francisco do Conde, and a written deed was issued on August 31, 1633. Friar Francisco de Lisboa was assigned as the first guardian. He was accompanied by two priests, a theology student brother, and two lay brothers. Work on the chapel of São Francisco de Assis were completed in 1639, and the Convent of Santo Antônio was built around the chapel in 1649.

The fifth superior of the convent, Friar Manuel das Neves, replaced the first church structure with the present, expanded structure in the 18th century. He additionally expanded the convent.

== Structure ==
The Church and Convent of Saint Antony is built on two stories and has a single nave, chancel, and transverse sacristy. The façade has windows with carved stonework frames and a galilee with five stonework arches over towers with pyramid-shaped tops. The pyramids are covered in blue and white tiles in a zig-zag pattern.

The nave has twenty-four figurative azulejos tile panels representing all sixteen miracles of Saint Anthony. The chancel has a jacaranda railing, a marble floor with diamond geometric shapes, and a barrel vault ceiling with a medallion. The sacristy has a flat ceiling with a medallion and is completely covered with azulejos tiles. Access to the sacristy was built through a three-part arch. All tiles used are Portuguese from the second half of the 18th century.

The convent was built on two floors around a small cloister surrounded by galleries with arches and Tuscan columns. The Third Order chapel was built around another open courtyard.

== Protected status ==
The Church and Convent of Saint Antony and Chapel of the Third Order was listed as a historic structure by the National Institute of Historic and Artistic Heritage in 1941.

== Access ==
Entry to the Church and Convent of Saint Antony and Chapel of the Third Order has been prohibited by the State of Bahia due to the instability of the structure. The grounds are open to the public and may be visited.
