= Church of Our Lady of the Rosary and the Guardian Angels =

Church of Our Lady of the Rosary and the Guardian Angels, Sallins
- Church of Our Lady and the Guardian Angels
- Eaglais Mhuire na Rosann agus na nAingeal Caomhnóra, Na Solláin
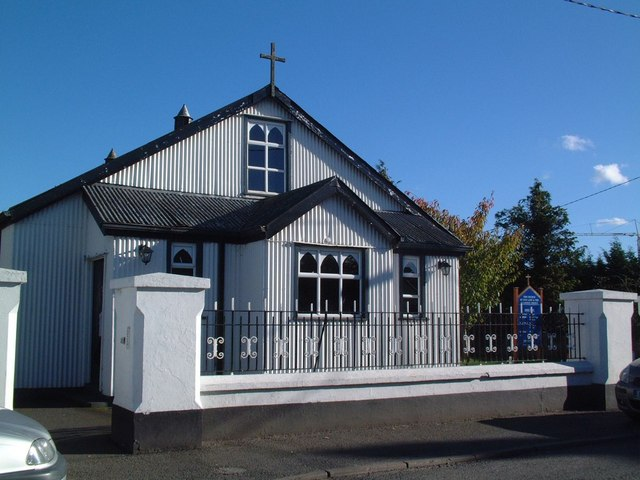
- West facade

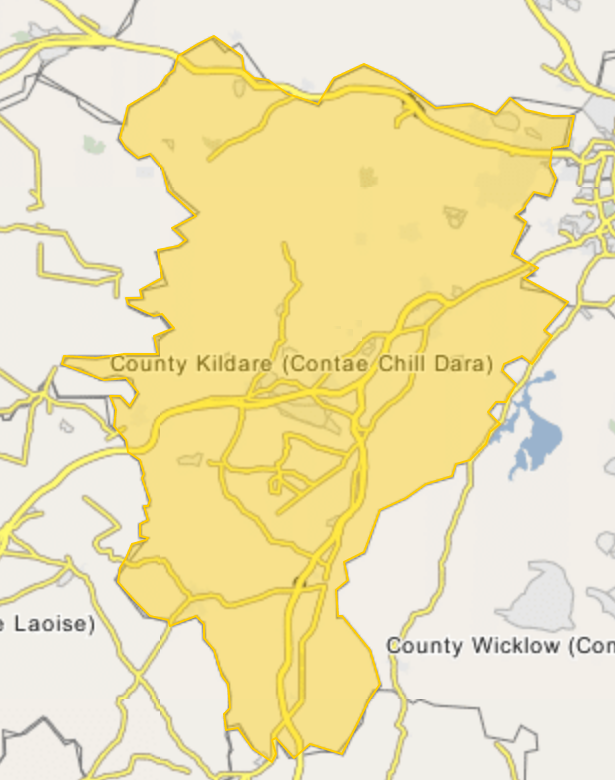
- Location within County Kildare Location within Ireland
- 53°14′55″N 6°39′50″W
- Location: Church Avenue, Sallins, County Kildare
- Country: Ireland
- Denomination: Catholic
- Churchmanship: Roman Rite
- Website: https://www.naasparish.ie/church/our-lady-and-the-guardian-angels-sallins/

History
- Dedication: Our Lady of the Rosary and the Guardian Angels
- Dedicated: 5 October 1924

Architecture
- Functional status: active
- Style: vernacular

Specifications
- Length: 22 m (72 ft)
- Width: 10 m (33 ft)
- Materials: Corrugated galvanised iron, wood

Administration
- Diocese: Kildare and Leighlin
- Deanery: Naas
- Parish: Sallins

The Church of Our Lady of the Rosary and the Guardian Angels is a 20th-century Catholic church in Sallins, Ireland. It is known for its unusual corrugated galvanised iron exterior, earning it the nickname "The Tin Church" or "The Tin-and-Timber Church."

== Location ==
Sallins Church is located near the core of Sallins village, 60 m (200 ft) south of the Grand Canal and 70 m (230 ft) east of the R407 road, Sallins' main street.

== History ==
In the early 20th century, the Catholics of Sallins had to travel to Naas to attend Mass; money was collected locally to build a church, but this was delayed by the First World War, Irish War of Independence and Irish Civil War. By 1920, about 400 pounds was available. Local priest Fr. Norris decided to purchase a prefabricated structure, of a type that was common in Britain and the Empire.

The Church of Our Lady and the Guardian Angels has a corrugated galvanised iron exterior and totally wooden interior. It was imported from England and erected in 1924 and is a simple rectangle in shape. It was dedicated to Our Lady of the Rosary and the Guardian Angels on 5 October 1924.

The altar is made of pitch pine and was gifted by Miss Condron of Eadestown; the external bell was a 19th-century gift by Fr Lockhart of Eadestown; Miss B. Hourihane, of Sallins national school, donated paintings, and the Boushell family gifted a stained-glass window by Franz Mayer of Munich.

In 1972 the altar was moved in line with the teachings of Vatican II; in 1990, a new floor was fitted, and in 2000 it became a protected structure. The church marked its centenary in 2024 and was renovated.

It is one of only four "tin tabernacle" churches still in use in Ireland, the others being in Rossnowlagh, Rearcross and County Leitrim.
