= Church and Convent of Our Lady of the Palm =

Church in Salvador, Bahia, Brazil

Church and Convent of Our Lady of Palma
- Igreja e Convento de Nossa Senhora da Palma
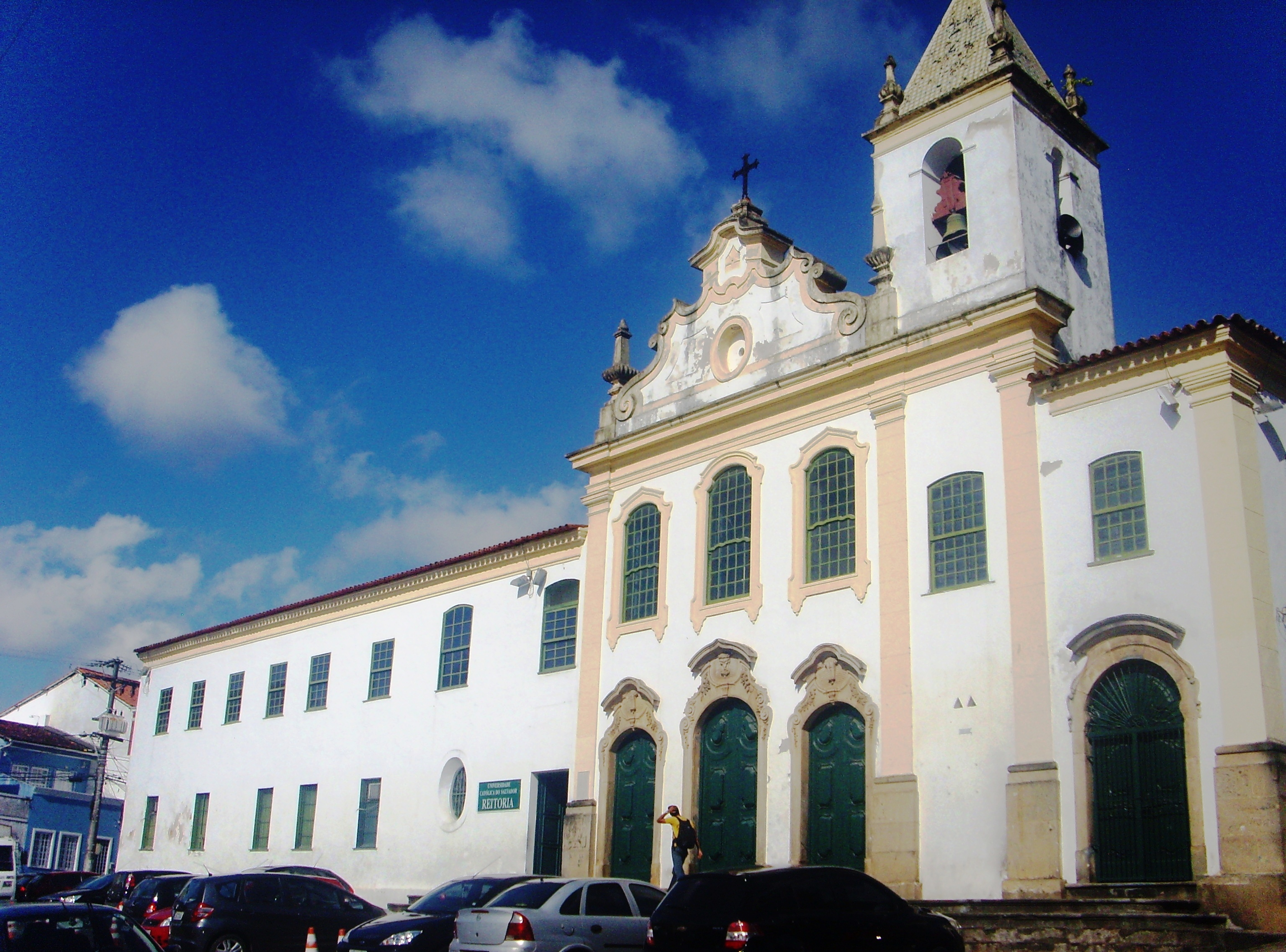
- Church and Convent of Our Lady of Palma, Salvador

- Location of the Church and Convent of Our Lady of Palma in Brazil Church and Convent of Our Lady of the Palm (South America)

Religion
- Affiliation: Catholic
- Rite: Roman
- Ownership: Roman Catholic Archdiocese of São Salvador da Bahia

Location
- Municipality: Salvador
- State: Bahia
- Country: Brazil
- Coordinates: 12.977688°S 38.510916°W

Architecture
- Style: Baroque
- Established: 1630
- Direction of façade: West

National Historic Heritage of Brazil
- Designated: 1938
- Reference no.: 122

The Church and Convent of Our Lady of the Palm (Portuguese: Igreja e Convento de Nossa Senhora da Palma, or more simply, Igreja da Palma) is a 17th-century Roman Catholic church in Salvador, Bahia, Brazil. The church is dedicated to Our Lady of the Palm and belongs to the Roman Catholic Archdiocese of São Salvador da Bahia. The church was established in 1830, and expanded to house members of the Order of Discalced Augustinians in Salvador and their missionaries from other Portuguese colonies. The church has a simple façade and a single bell tower. In contrast, the church has a richly decorated interior, with paintings, images, furniture, and religious implements from the 16th and 17th century. The Church and Convent of Our Lady of the Palm was listed as a historic structure by the National Institute of Historic and Artistic Heritage in 1938.

== History ==
The Church and Convent of Our Lady of the Palm sits on a hill, known as Monte Palma, on the second line of hills beyond the Historic Center of Salvador. Spanish-Portuguese troops used the site of the church as an encampment during the Recapture of Bahia from the Dutch in 1625. The current church was constructed in 1630 by Bernardino da Cruz Arraes. The convent, known as the Hospício dos Agostinianos Discalços, was added in 1670 to receive missionaries of the Order of Discalced Augustinians. The church was enlarged in the same period to meet the liturgical requirements of the Augustinian community. A royal order issued in 1778 mandated that the convent serve as a refuge in Salvador for Augustinian missionaries arriving from "São Tomé Island and lands of the coast of Africa."

Miguel Pereira da Costa, a military engineer of the Lisbon Historical Overseas Archives (Arquivo Histórico Ultramarino de Lisboa), arrived in Brazil in 1711. Da Costa used the model of the Church and Convent of Our Lady of the Palm to constructed the Parish Church of Santa Cruz de Cabrália in Bahia after his arrival. The model, with a plan in the shape of a "T", a rectangular nave, a chancel flanked by two symmetrical rooms, a sacristy, and consistory, is found in both churches. Two smaller portals and altars were added to the Church of Our Lady of the Palm in 1778; a bell tower was added in 1780. The hospice and cloister were renovated in 1788. The high altar was altered in 1803; its central image was retained. The Brotherhood of the Holy Cross joined the Discalced Augustinians in the structure in 1751. The Augustinians returned to Portugal in 1822 after the independence of Brazil from Portugal. Full ownership of the church and convent by the Holy Cross brotherhood was confirmed in a royal degree of March 7, 1829.

The church and convent have been renovated numerous times since the 19th century. The paintings of the church were restored between 1879 and 1885. The convent was restored by IPHAN between 1944 and 1945. The floors and ceilings of the second floor were stabilized in 1945, and of the sacristy between 1952 and 1953. Emergency repairs were carried out in 1962 and 1965 on the roof to prevent water damage to the Baroque interior of the nave.

== Location ==
The Church and Convent of Our Lady of the Palm is located on the second line of hills beyond the Historic Center of Salvador on a hill formerly known as Monte Palma. The church opens to a public square, now known as Praça Ana Neri, and is flanked by numerous 18th- and 19th-century residences.

== Structure ==
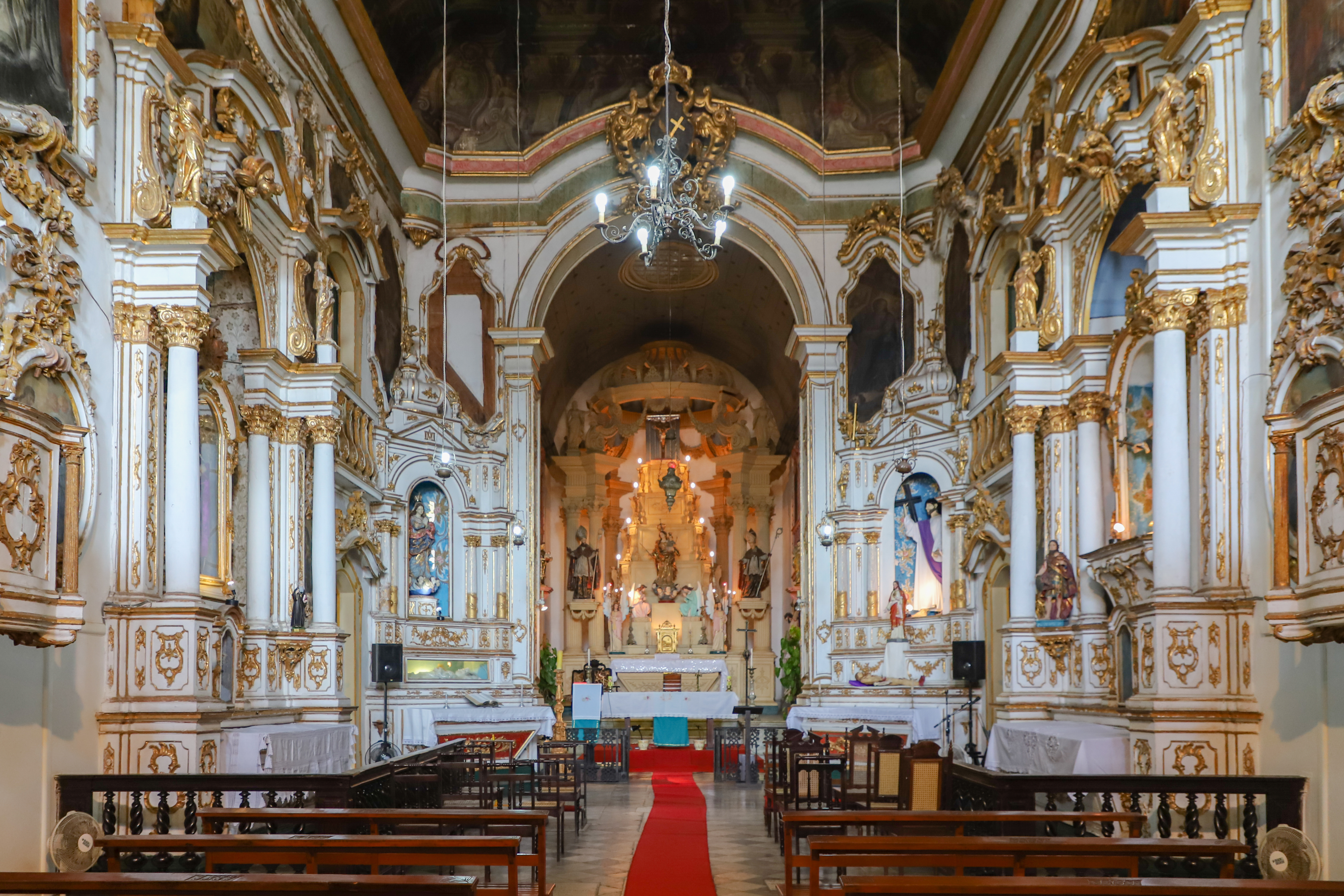
View of the nave, chancel, and high altar

The Church and Convent of Our Lady of the Palm is of stone masonry with extensive use of wood in the interior, notably the nave. The façade is simple, with a central portal with a stone frame flanked by two side doors with stone frames. The portal opens to Praça Ana Neri. The choir level of the façade has three windows at the level of the upper choir which follow the pattern of the church portals. The pediment of the façade has an oculus at its center. The church has a single bell tower; it is crowned by a pyramid roof, a feature typical of other bell towers in Bahia.

The nave spans 20 metres (66 ft) by 8 metres (26 ft). The chancel opens to a consistory and sacristy. The interior of the church dates to the period of transition from the rococo to neoclassicism. The nave and chancel have richly decorated stone flooring. A lioz limestone inlay panel of the floor of the chancel is in white, yellow, grey, and red and has the name of the Brother of Our Lady of the Palm (Irmandade de N.S. da Palma) and year, 1875, at center.

The church has images of saints from the 17th and 18th centuries. The statue of Our Lady of the Palms dates to the 17th century and is now located on the high altar. A commemorative marker was placed in the church in 1898 that states that the Our Lady statue was brought from Lisbon in 1630; no evidence exists to confirm or deny the origin of the work. A statue of Saint Helen is the work of Bento Sabino dos Reis; the statue of the crucified Christ was brought from the Chapel of Our Lady of Help in 1751. Two panels in the church depict scenes from the life of Saint Augustine; these, along with the large central panel of the nave ceiling, are attributed to Veríssimo de Souza Freitas. The nave painting in the baroque style, a notable feature of the church, dates to the end of the 18th century and is in the illusionist trompe-l'œil style; it greatly resembles that of the nave ceiling painting of the Convent and Church of Lapa.

=== Sacristy ===
The sacristy of the Church of Our Lady of the Palm has a large sacristy cabinet surmounted by paintings and a central niche with a crucifix. A lavabo of lioz limestone is in red and white with two elaborately carved mascarons at center; it has ornate volutes above and a basin red.

== Protected status ==
The Church and Convent of Our Lady of the Palm, both the structure and its contents, was listed as a historic structure by the National Institute of Historic and Artistic Heritage in 1938 under inscription number 122.

== Access ==
Much of the convent of the Church and Convent of Our Lady of Palma was converted to a school. The church is open to the public and may be visited.
