= Phùng Khoang Church =

- Nhà thờ Phùng Khoang; Église Phùng Khoang
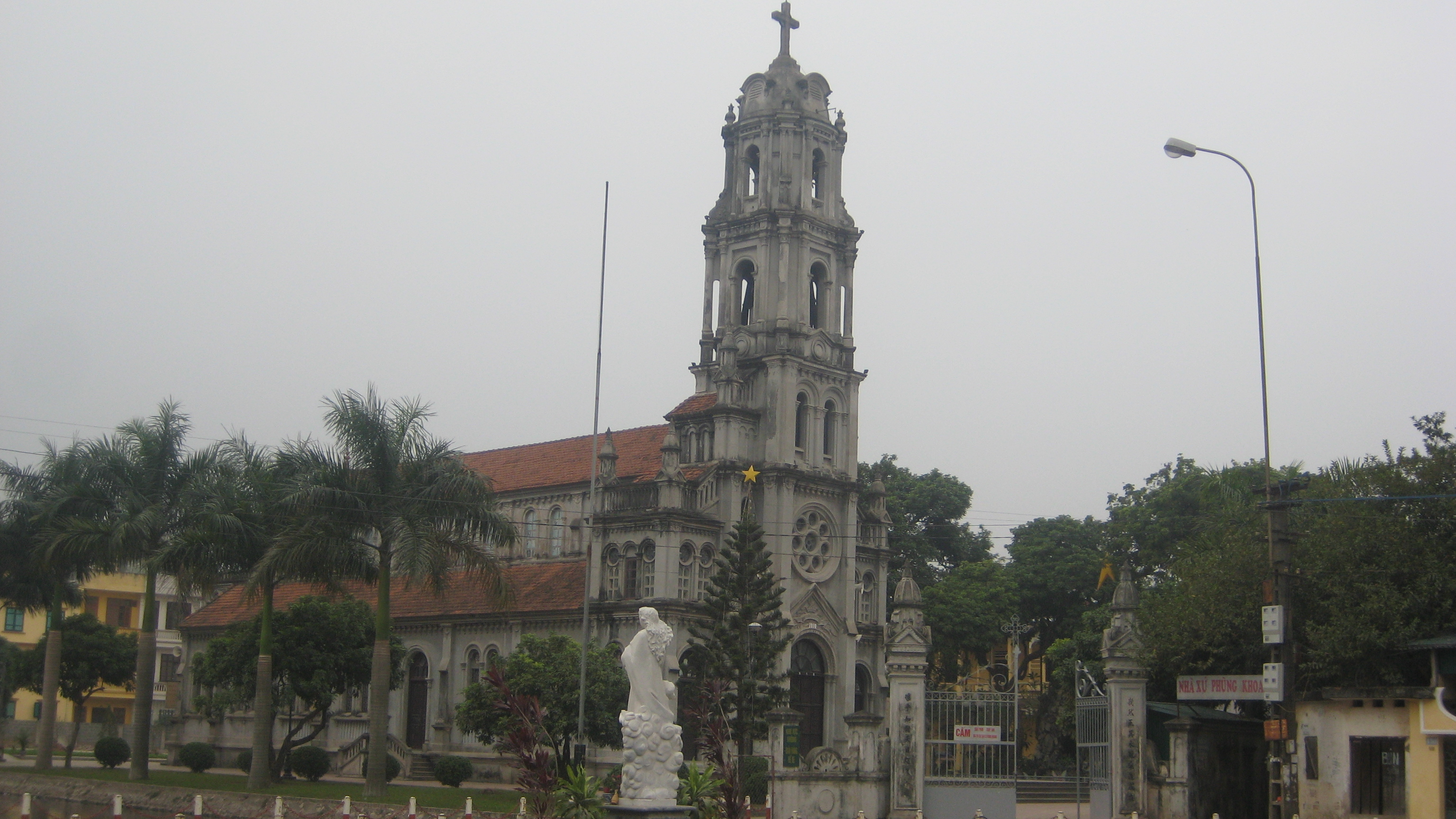

Religion
- Affiliation: Catholic Church

Location
- Location: 161 Phùng Khoang Street, Trung Văn Ward, Nam Từ Liêm district
- Municipality: Hanoi
- Country: Vietnam

Architecture
- Style: French Neoclassical
- Completed: 1920
- Official name: Church of Our Lady of the Rosary; Nhà thờ Đức Mẹ Mân Côi; Église Notre-Dame du Rosaire

Phùng Khoang Church (Vietnamese: Nhà thờ Phùng Khoang, French: Église Phùng Khoang), officially Church of Our Lady of the Rosary (Vietnamese: Nhà thờ Đức Mẹ Mân Côi, French: Église Notre-Dame du Rosaire) is a church in Nam Từ Liêm district, Hanoi, Vietnam. The church was built in 1910 in French neoclassical style.
