= Sallins =

Town in County Kildare, Ireland

Sallins Irish: Na Solláin
- Town
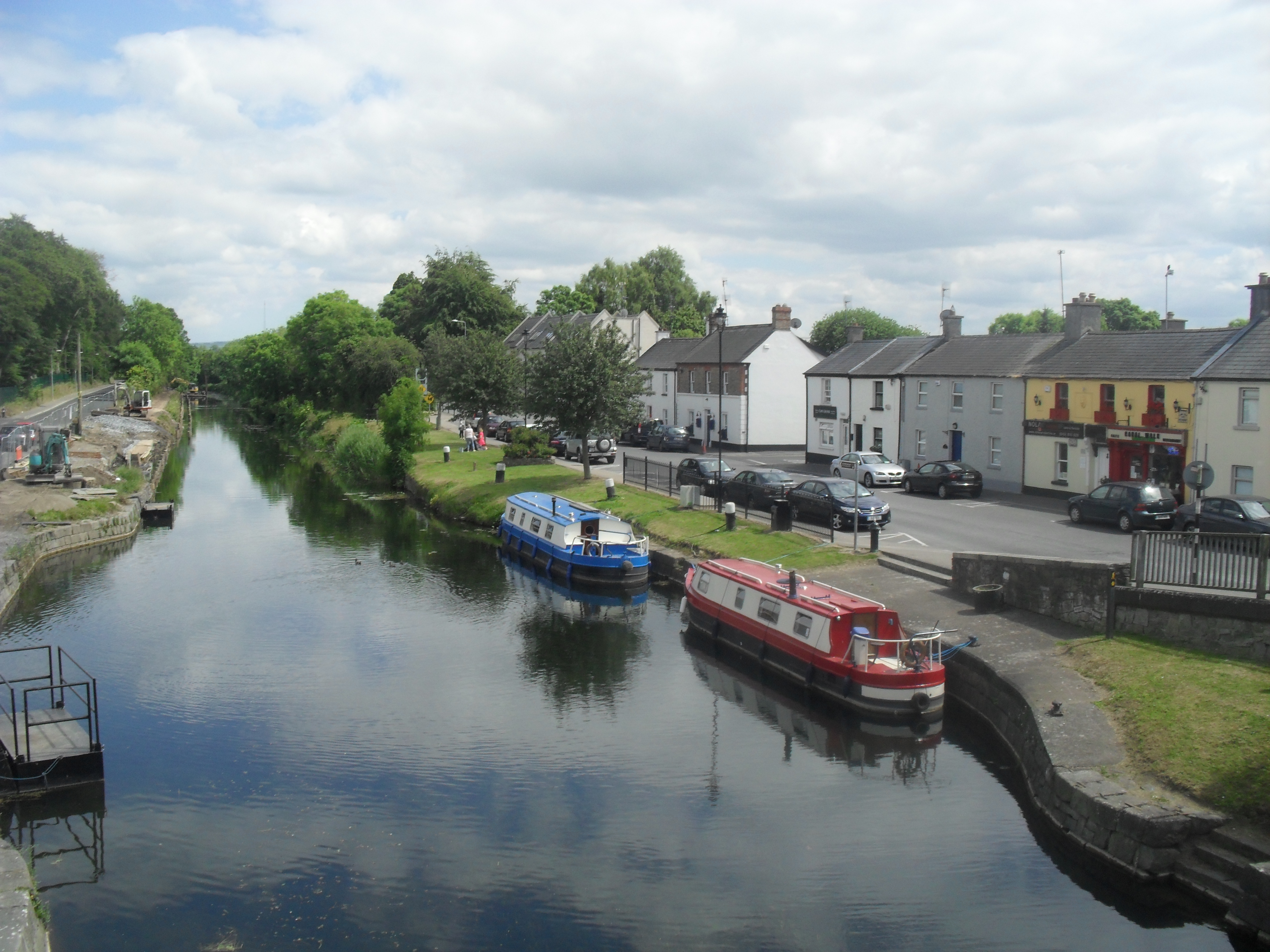
- Sallins marina

- Location in Ireland
- Coordinates: 53°14′57″N 6°39′54″W
- Country: Ireland
- Province: Leinster
- County: County Kildare
- Elevation: 96 m (315 ft)

Population (2022)
  - Total: 6,269
- Time zone: UTC±0 (WET)
  - Summer (DST): UTC+1 (IST)
- Eircode: W91
- Telephone area code: 045
- Irish Grid Reference: N888230

Sallins /ˈsælɪnz/ (Irish: Na Solláin) is a town in County Kildare, Ireland, situated 3.5 km north of the town centre of Naas, from which it is separated by the M7 motorway. Sallins is the anglicised name of Na Solláin which means "the willows".

In the Central Statistics Office census of 2022, Sallins had a population of 6,269, more than double the 2,922 recorded in the 2002 census. It is the tenth largest settlement in Kildare and the 80th largest in Ireland. Sallins grew as a result of its position on both the Grand Canal and the Dublin to Cork railway line. Historically, the town's major employers were Odlums Flour Mills and a meat factory, both of which have now closed.

Theobald Wolfe Tone is buried near Sallins in Bodenstown graveyard. Each summer, Irish republicans of various political and paramilitary groupings congregate at Sallins to hold commemorations at Tone's grave.

== History ==
Sallins developed as a village with the opening of the Grand Canal to traffic in 1779 and a passenger service in 1780.

In the last decades of the 19th century and the early 20th century, Sallins was a popular spot for visitors to the grave of Wolfe Tone to gather before marching to the gravesite. Many visitors would take the train from Dublin to Sallins and walk the 2.5 km to Tone's grave in Bodenstown.

The Church of Our Lady of the Rosary and the Guardian Angels, a prefabricated "tin tabernacle" Catholic church, was built in 1924.

On 31 March 1976, a Cork to Dublin mail train was robbed and approximately £200,000 was stolen at a small farm crossing on the main train line near Sallins.

In the 1990s and 2000s, Sallins became a commuter town of Dublin. The population grew significantly, increasing sevenfold between 1996 and 2022.

== Transport ==
Historical population
Year	Pop.	±%
1821	348	—
1831	419	+20.4%
1841	392	−6.4%
1851	308	−21.4%
1861	348	+13.0%
1871	452	+29.9%
1881	279	−38.3%
1891	318	+14.0%
1901	253	−20.4%
1911	291	+15.0%
1926	349	+19.9%
1936	276	−20.9%
1946	261	−5.4%
1951	259	−0.8%
1956	338	+30.5%
1961	420	+24.3%
1966	465	+10.7%
1971	631	+35.7%
1981	817	+29.5%
1986	774	−5.3%
1991	783	+1.2%
1996	854	+9.1%
2002	2,922	+242.2%
2006	3,806	+30.3%
2011	5,283	+38.8%
2016	5,849	+10.7%
2022	6,269	+7.2%

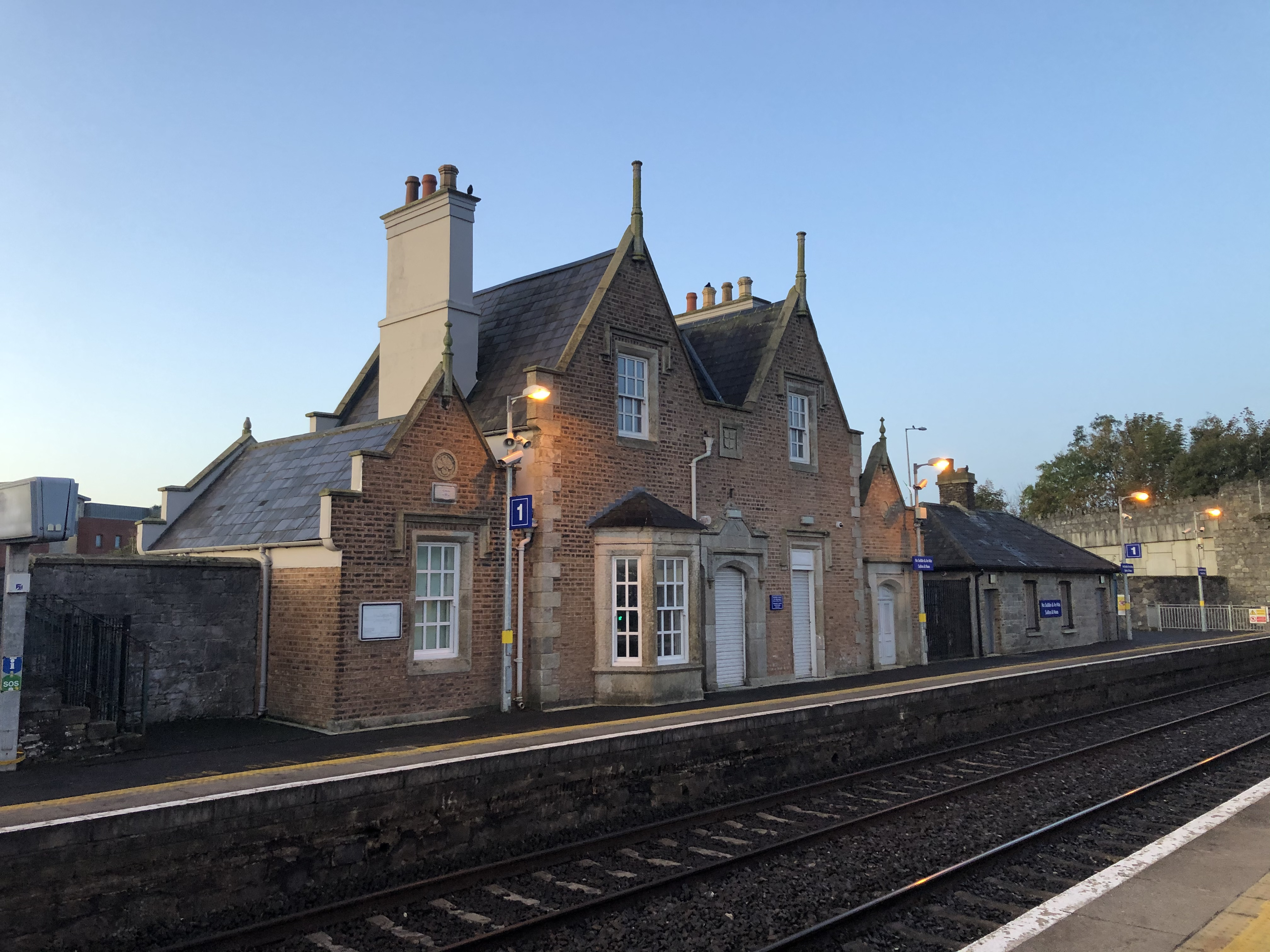
Sallins and Naas railway station was built in the 1840s

The village's railway station serves both Sallins itself and neighbouring Naas, as reflected in its official name of "Sallins and Naas". Originally named just "Sallins", it opened on 4 August 1846 and was the junction for the Tullow branch, which included the original Naas station. It closed in 1963, and was renamed Sallins & Naas upon re-opening in 1994, as part of the Kildare "Arrow" commuter rail project. A feeder bus operates between the station and the centre of Naas (Poplar Square & Post Office). The station was the location of the Sallins Train robbery, Ireland's largest train robbery, which occurred on 31 March 1976. Several hundred thousand pounds were stolen from a CIÉ train. Several people were tried for the robbery and jailed, and the case eventually was adjudged a significant miscarriage of justice.

== Sport and amenities ==
Sallins GAA has its grounds in the centre of the village, which include a championship-sized pitch, a clubhouse, and dressing rooms. The GAA club has existed since 1885.

The village is also home to the soccer club Sallins Celtic, and the Sallins Dramatic Society.

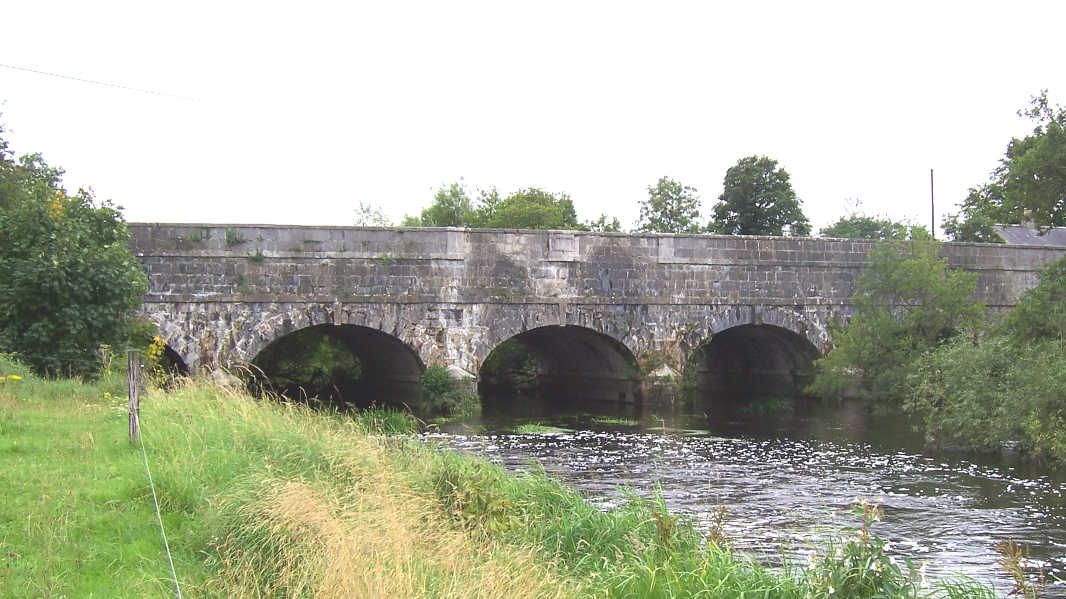
Leinster Aqueduct constructed by Richard Evans

The canal near the village is used for fishing and boating. The Leinster Aqueduct is situated nearby, midway along the canal between Sallins and Caragh. This is the point where the Grand Canal crosses the River Liffey. In 2015, a passenger boat service began operating, offering cruise excursions to Leinster Aqueduct and Digby Lock.

Each year since 2004, during August, the Sallins Community Festival is held, which includes some local activities, including a beauty contest called 'Queen of the Waterways'.

Sallins has one national (primary) school. As of 2020, Sallins National School (also known as St Laurences National School), had over 680 pupils enrolled.

== See also ==
- List of towns and villages in Ireland
