= Shuangshu Church =

Shuangshu Church (双树教堂) also known as Our Lady of the Rosary Church (玫瑰圣母堂) is a Catholic church located in Wuqing District in Tianjin, China.

== History ==
It was first built in 1867. Its original design was unique among Catholic churches, as its interior was designed in the form of a Chinese 人 (ren) character with the altar at the top point. This was done by the missionaries who took into account the local cultural beliefs that held men and women should be separate. Therefore, the church was designed so that the men sat on one branch and the women sat on the other, while the priest at the altar (at the intersection of the branches) said mass for both and gave the sacraments to both.

This church formerly belonged to the archdiocese of Beijing and its predecessor, the Apostolic Vicariate of Northern Chi-Li.

As a result of an increase in Catholics, the church was rebuilt in 1932. The church did not survive the Cultural Revolution; by 1976 its structure was completely removed and the land was taken over by the local government.

Beginning in 1984, local Catholics began organizing and calling for the property to be returned to the church. The government returned the land in 2004-2005 and construction for a new church was carried out from 2009 to 2010. The church was then opened for mass.
