= São Sebastião do Passé =

- Municipality
- Location within Bahia

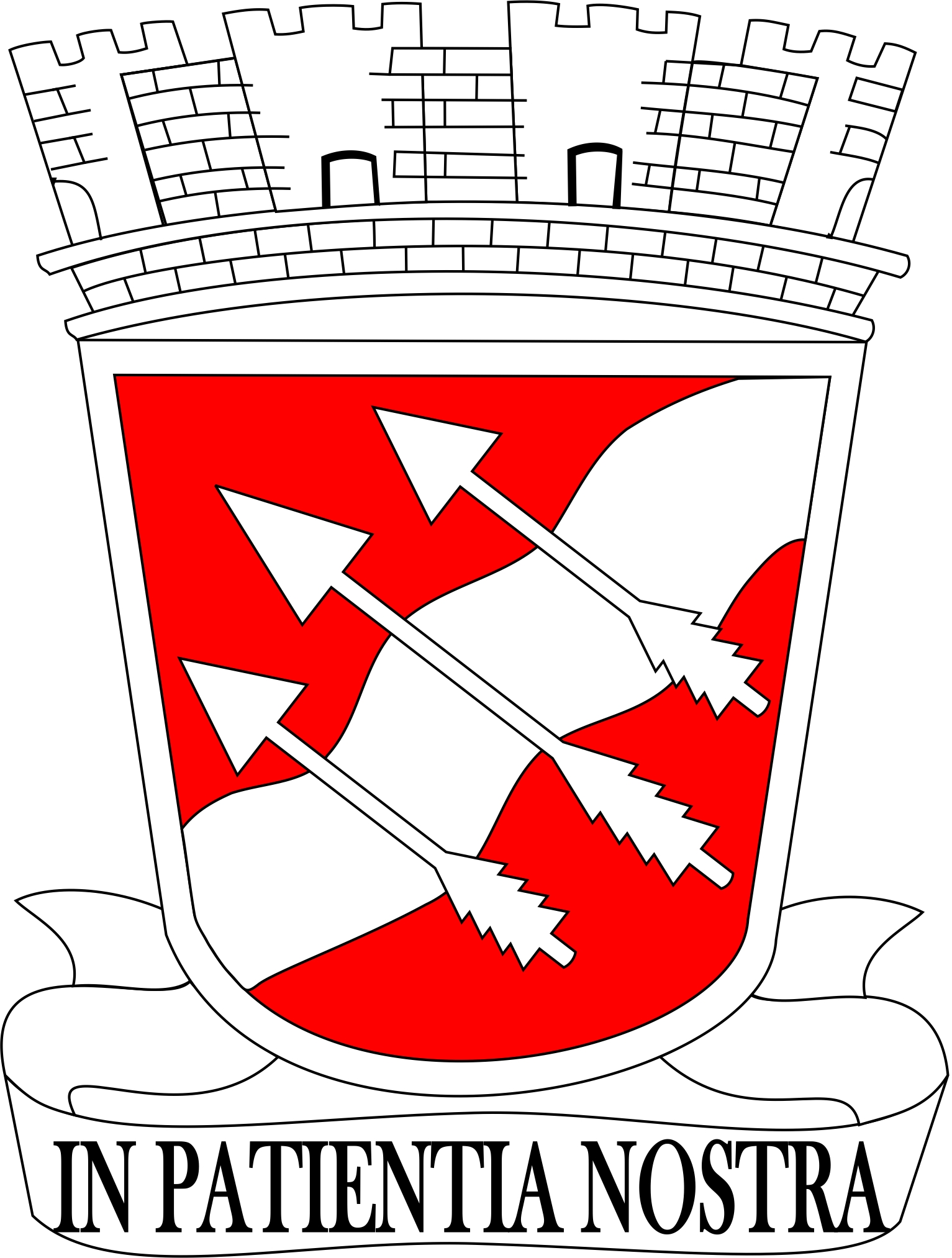
- Flag Coat of arms

- Location within Brazil Location within South America
- Coordinates: 12°30′46″S 38°29′42″W
- Country: Brazil
- Region: Nordeste
- State: Bahia

Area
  - Total: 207.85 sq mi (538.32 km^{2})

Population (2020)
  - Total: 44,430
  - Density: 213.8/sq mi (82.53/km^{2})
- Time zone: UTC−3 (BRT)

São Sebastião do Passé is a municipality in the state of Bahia in the North-East region of Brazil. With a total area of 538.32 km²

== See also ==
- List of municipalities in Bahia
