= São Francisco do Conde =

São Francisco do Conde Município de São Francisco do Conde
- Municipality
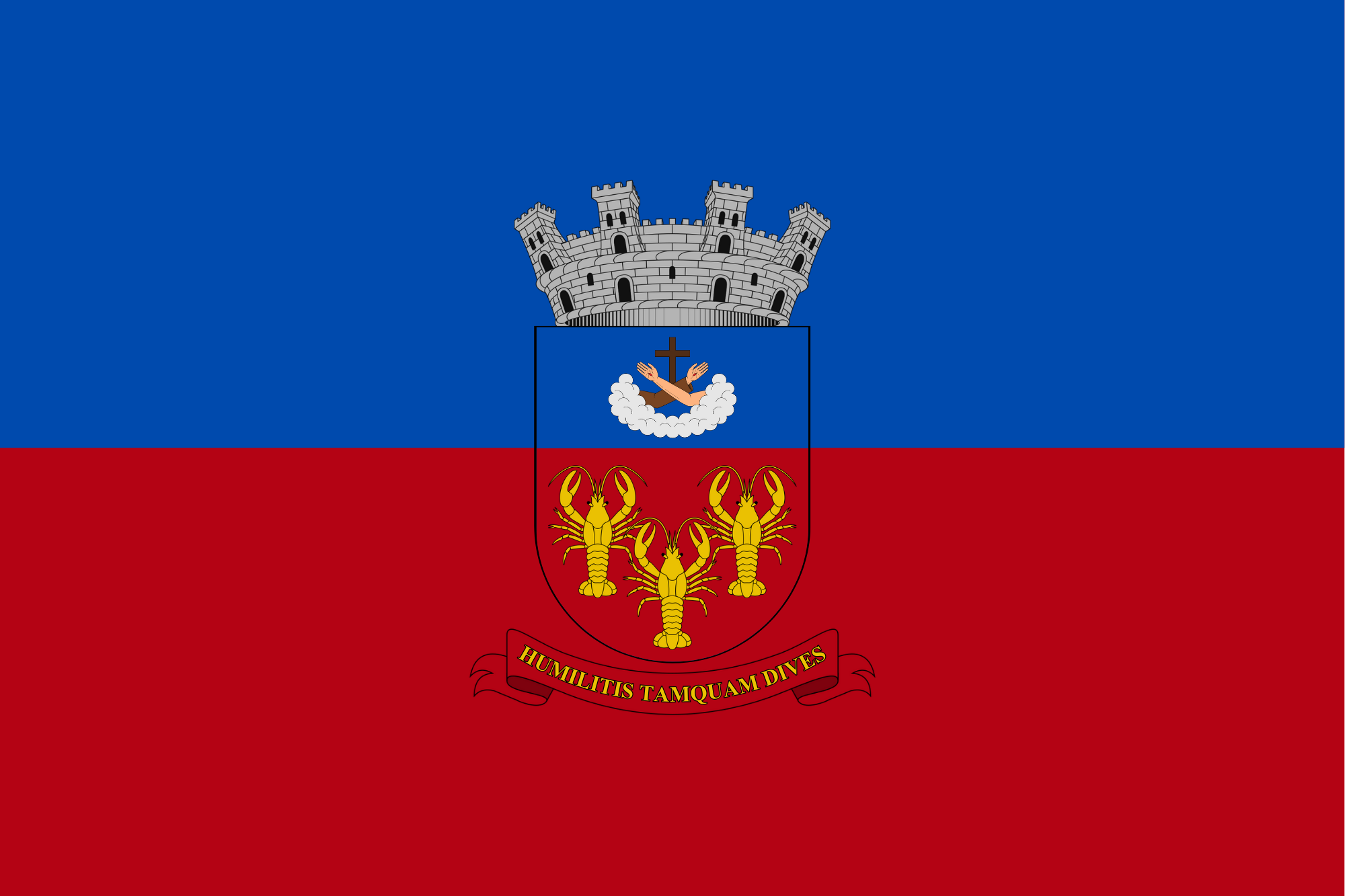
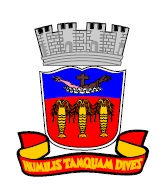
- Flag Coat of arms

- Location of São Francisco do Conde in Bahia

- Location of São Francisco do Conde in Brazil
- Coordinates: 12°39′S 38°41′W
- Country: Brazil
- Region: Northeast
- State: Bahia
- Founded: 1697

Government
  - Mayor: Evandro Almeida1 (2013–2016)

Area
  - Total: 262.856 km^{2} (101.489 sq mi)

Population (2020)
  - Total: 40,245
  - Density: 153.11/km^{2} (396.54/sq mi)
- Demonym: franciscano
- Time zone: UTC−3 (BRT)
- Website: saofranciscodoconde.ba.gov.br

São Francisco do Conde is a municipality in the state of Bahia in the North-East region of Brazil. São Francisco do Conde covers 262.856 km^{2} (101.489 mi^{2}), and has a population of 40,245 with a population density of 150 inhabitants per square kilometer. It is located 67 kilometres (42 mi) from the state capital of Salvador. According to the Brazilian Institute of Geography and Statistics São Francisco do Conde has the highest concentration of Brazilians of African descent (90%) in Bahia.

São Francisco do Conde is home to Campus dos Malês, one of the campuses of the University of International Integration of African-Brazilian Lusophony. The campus opened in 2013.

== History ==
This town was built on land granted to Fernão Rodrigues Castello Branco in 1559, who donated his property in the following year to Francisco de Sá, the son of the third Governor General, who built the Real de Sergipe sugar plantation in 1563. The Count of Linhares ordered the construction of a convent and church on a hilltop in the Bahian Recôncavo in 1618. The region was only settled by the Portuguese after wars with native people of the Paraguaçu and Jaguaribe rivers. Slavery existed in São Francisco do Conde as early as 1563. It later became the city of San Francisco do Conde. The city was named for the Count of Linhares, who inherited the land of the 3rd General Governor of Brazil, Mem de Sá (c. 1500 – 2 March 1572). His widow donated the plantations and land to Jesuit colleges in Lisbon and Salvador; the land and property were seized and sold by the Portuguese government during the expulsion of the Jesuits from Brazil in 1759.

Gaspar Pinto dos Reis and his wife donated land near the town center to the Franciscans 1629. They built a large-scale house and chapel on the site, which became the Church and Convent of Saint Antony and Chapel of the Third Order.

São Francisco do Conde was originally divided into approximately 20 freguesas; by the mid-18th century they were consolidated into three: São Gonçalo, the seat of the town; Nossa Senhora do Monte; and Nossa Senhora do Socorro. Numerous colonial-period buildings and ruins of the plantations remain in municipalities.

== Culture ==
São Francisco do Conde retains numerous cultural traditions due to its history of slavery and large Afro-Brazilian population. The town is noted as a center of the Candomblé religion, capoeira, and capa bode, masks created by Bantu slaves from Angola, now worn during Carnival.

=== Historic structures ===
São Francisco do Conde is home to numerous historic structures, many designated as Brazilian national and Bahian state monuments.

- Church and Convent of Saint Antony and Chapel of the Third Order (Convento e Igreja de Santo Antônio e Capela da Ordem Terceira)
- Parish Church of Saint Gonsalo (Igreja Matriz de São Gonçalo)
- Town Hall and Prison (Casa de Câmara e Cadeia)
- Monastery of São Bento das Lajes (Mosteiro de São Bento das Lajes), later the Imperial Agricultural School of Bahia (Imperial Escola Agrícola da Bahia)
- Sobrado and Factory of the Cajaíba Sugar Plantation (Sobrado do Engenho Cajaíba)
- Main House and Chapel of the Água Sugar Plantation (Casa Grande e Capela do Engenho D'Água)
- Church of Our Lady of the Mount (Igreja de Nossa Senhora do Monte)
- Chapel of Our Lady of Victory (Capela de Nossa Senhora do Vencimento)
- Chapel of Saint Antony of Mataripe (Capela de Santo António de Mataripe))

== See also ==
- List of municipalities in Bahia
