= Marco da Fundação da Cidade do Salvador =

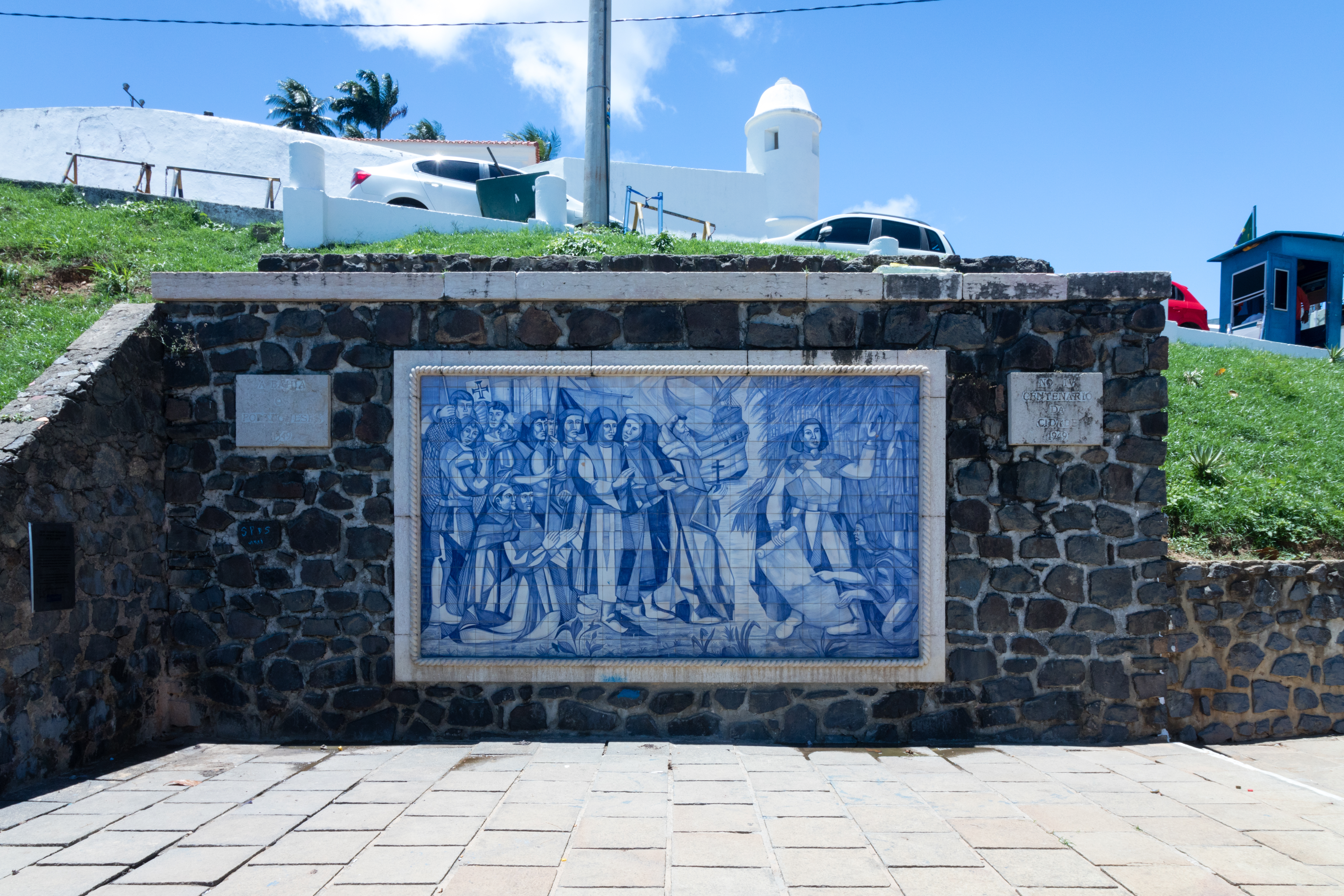
- Artist: João Fragoso, Eduardo Gomes
- Year: 1952
- Medium: lioz limestone, azulejo tiles
- Subject: 400th anniversary of the foundation of Salvador
- Location: Salvador

Marco da Fundação da Cidade do Salvador (English: City of Salvador Foundation Landmark) is a monument in Salvador, Bahia, Brazil. It is located at the north of the Porto da Barra Beach and directly below the São Diogo Fort. It commemorates the 400th century of the founding of Salvador, and was inaugurated on March 29, 1952. The monument consists of two parts: a limestone pillar, and a mural of azulejos.

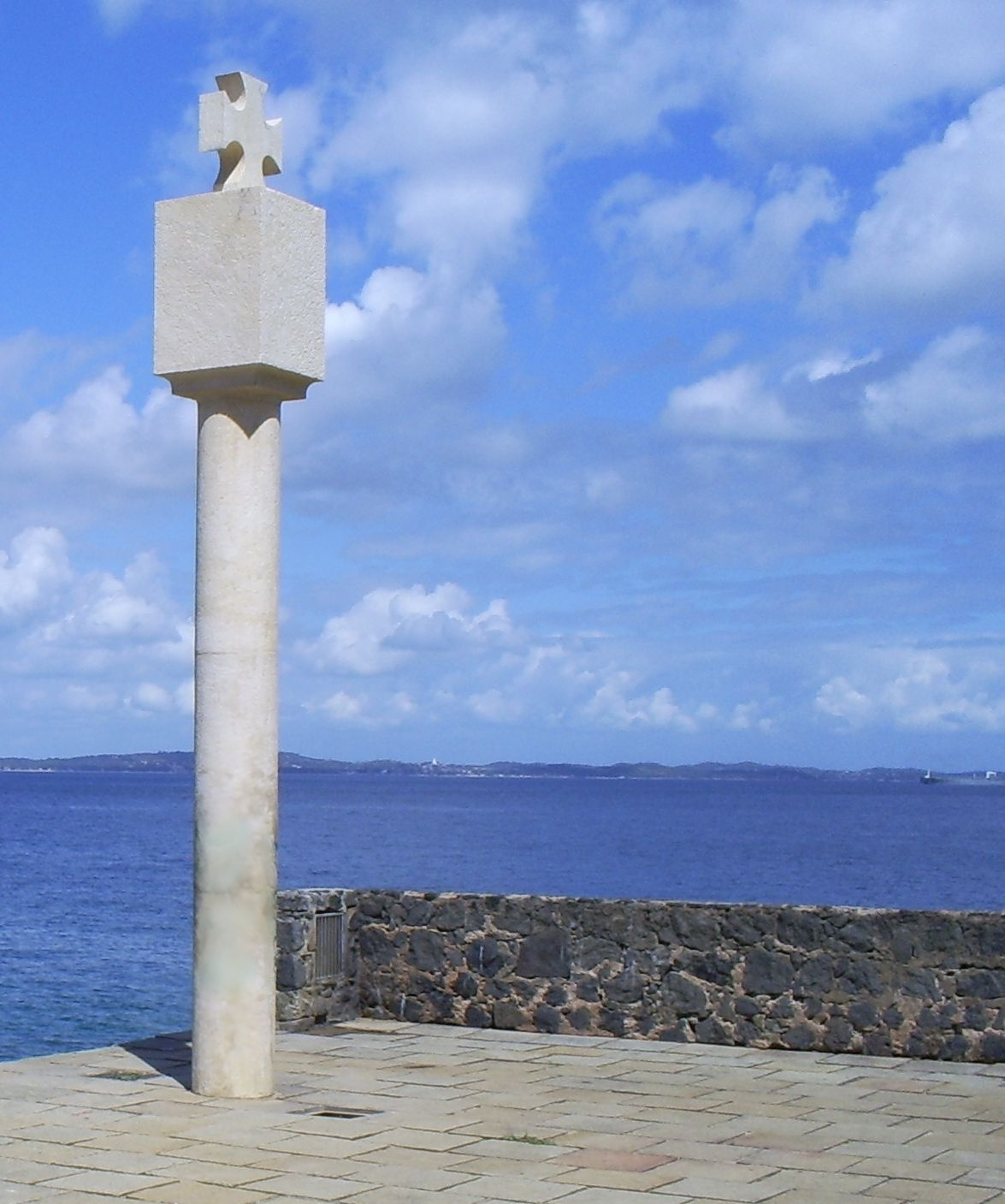
Column of lioz limestone

The stone pillar is 6 metres (20 ft) and made from lioz limestone; it features structure with symbols of Portuguese Crown and the Cross of Christ at top. The panel of azulejos, or blue and white tiles, depicts the arrival of Tomé de Sousa (1503–1579), the first governor-general of Bahia. The stone pillar was carved by João Fragoso, a Portuguese artisan. It was installed on March 29, 1952. Eduardo Gomes, a Portuguese artist, designed the azulejos in 2003 using a scene by Joaquim Rebocho (1912-2003). The panel of azulejos is 4.2 metres (14 ft) long by 1.97 metres (6.5 ft). The monument is the property of the City of Salvador. It was restored in 2013 and 2017.

Antônio Carlos Magalhães Neto, mayor of Salvador, designated the monument a landmark of the City of Salvador on January 27, 2019. Landmark status was requested by the Associação de Moradores e Amigos da Barra, a residents association, and the Academy of Letters of Bahia.

== See also ==
- Porto da Barra Beach
- João Fragoso
- Joaquim Rebocho
