= Church of Saint Antony of Barra =

Church in Salvador, Bahia, Brazil

- Igreja de Santo António da Barra
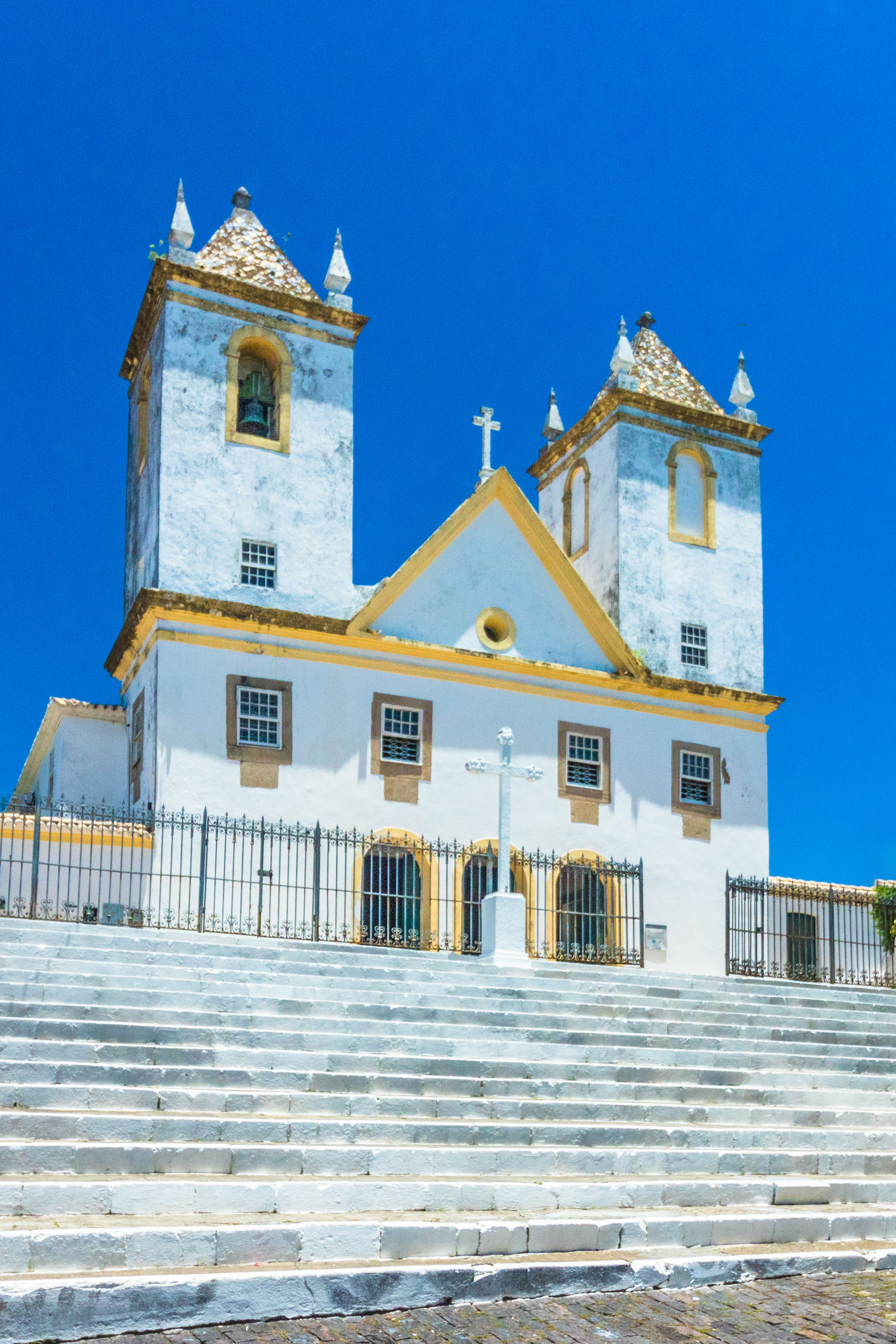
- Church of Saint Antony of Barra, Salvador, Bahia, Brazil

- Location of the Church of Saint Antony of Barra in Brazil Church of Saint Antony of Barra (South America)

Religion
- Affiliation: Catholic
- Rite: Roman
- Ownership: Roman Catholic Archdiocese of São Salvador da Bahia
- Patron: Saint Anthony

Location
- Municipality: Salvador
- State: Bahia
- Country: Brazil
- Interactive map of Church of Saint Antony of Barra
- Coordinates: 13.001257°S 38.532225°W

Architecture
- Style: Renaissance
- Established: 1600s
- Direction of façade: West

National Historic Heritage of Brazil
- Designated: 1938
- Reference no.: 122

The Church of Saint Antony of Barra (Portuguese: Igreja de Santo António da Barra) is a 17th-century Roman Catholic church in Salvador, Bahia, Brazil. It is one of three churches in Salvador dedicated to Saint Anthony of Padua and belongs to the Roman Catholic Archdiocese of São Salvador da Bahia. The church was likely founded in the 17th century on a point overlooking the Bay of All Saints. It features a simple Renaissance-style façade, nave, chancel, sacristy, and other rooms.

== History ==
The early history of the church is unclear. It likely dates to the end of the 17th century during the colonization of Brazil.

== Location ==
The Church of Saint Antony of Barra is located on a hillside at the southeast tip of the city. It sits directly above Forte de São Diogo and provided a strategic view of the Bay of All Saints. The church overlooks the south-west tip of the city towards the Forte de Santo Antônio da Barra and the Barra Lighthouse and a view north to the Small Fort of Our Lady of Monserrate and Church and Monastery of Our Lady of Monserrate on the Itapagipe Peninsula. The church is visible to the north above the Porto da Barra Beach. It was listed as a historic structure by the National Institute of Historic and Artistic Heritage in 1938.

== Structure ==
The Church of Saint Antony of Barra is of stone and lime masonry. The façade of the church has a simple triangular classical pediment with a small oculus at its base. Three portals are at center with four windows at the choir level; the church is flanked by two bell towers. The towers are crowned by pyramid roofs, each covered in tile. It has a single nave, chorus, and hall with numerous rooms to the left of the nave. A meeting room opens to the left of the chancel and the sacristy to the right. The upper floor is accessed via an external staircase, a feature common to early churches in Bahia. Candido Alves de Souza (1840-1884) completed carvings in the chancel of Santo Antonio da Barra in the late 19th century.

== Protected status ==
The Church of Saint Antony of Barra, both the structure and its contents, was listed as a historic structure by the National Institute of Historic and Artistic Heritage in 1938 under inscription number 122.

== Access ==
The Church of Saint Antony of Barra is open to the public and may be visited.
