= Porto da Barra Beach =

Beach in Salvador, Bahia, Brazil

- Beach
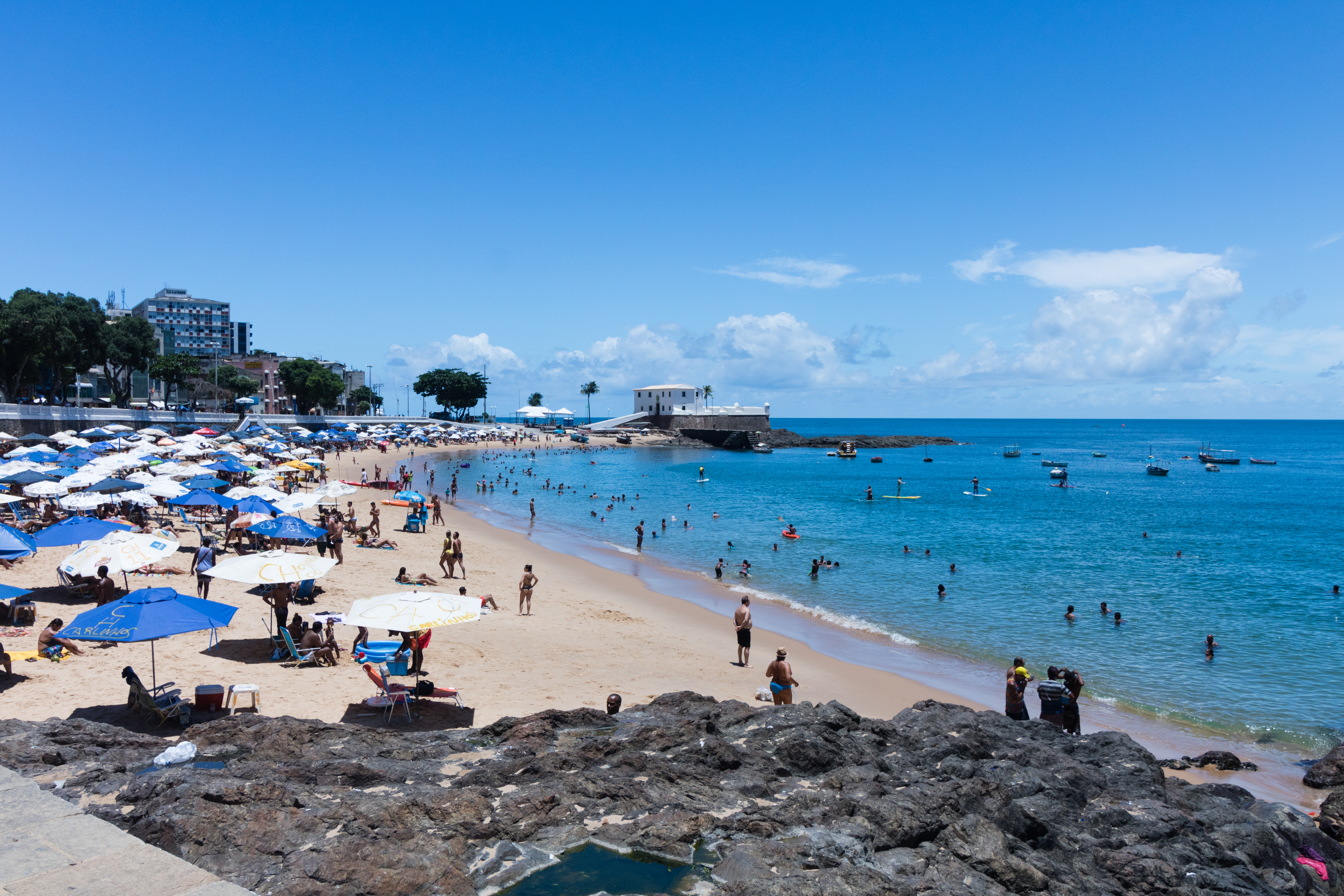

- Location within Brazil
- Coordinates: 13.003317°S 38.532903°W
- Location: Salvador, Bahia, Brazil

Porto da Barra Beach is located in Barra neighborhood in the city of Salvador, Bahia, in Brazil. It is located at the entrance of the Baía de Todos os Santos (Bay of All Saints), is 300 metres (980 ft), and ranges between numerous Portuguese colonial-period military fortifications. The southern range of the beach is on a slope just above of the Barra Lighthouse at Santo Antônio da Barra Fort; the northern range of the beach is at São Diogo Fort. The Santa Maria Fort extends from a point near the southern end of the beach. The beach, unlike the bay, has calm water. It is one of the few west-facing beaches in Brazil and attracts numerous residents and tourists to watch the sunset.

Porto da Barra was the site of Bahia's first European settlement, Vila Velha. The Marco da Fundação da Cidade do Salvador, a marble column and panel of azulejo tiles, was placed at the north of the beach to commemorate the 400th anniversary of the arrival of the Portuguese in Bahia.

Porto da Barra was a popular hangout for the Tropicalistas in the 1960s, notably Caetano Veloso and Gilberto Gil. Veloso's song Qual é Baiana? is inspired by the beach. The beach suffers from marine pollution due to the underdeveloped sewage system of Salvador and inadequate garbage collection.

== See also ==
- Discovery of Brazil
- LGBT tourism in Brazil
- Portuguese maritime exploration
