= Salamina Putumuju Quilombola Community =

Comunidade Quilombola Salamina Putumuju
- Interactive map of Comunidade Quilombola Salamina Putumuju

Population
  - Total: 150

Salamina Putumuju is a quilombo remnant community, a traditional Brazilian population, located in the Brazilian municipality of Maragojipe, in Bahia. The Salamina Putumuju community consists of a population of 40 families, distributed across an area of 2,061.5588 hectares, spread across seven rural properties. The territory was certified as a quilombo remnant (historical remnants of former quilombos) in 2008 by the Palmares Cultural Foundation.

This community had its Technical Identification and Delimitation Report published in 2007 (a stage of land regularization), but its land tenure situation is still under review (not titled) at INCRA.

The community was formed on the banks of the Paraguaçu River during the sugar era (16th century). The approximately 150 residents live off agriculture, cultivating cassava, corn and beans, and also engage in fishing.

== Territorial situation ==
The lack of land title (land regularization) creates difficulties for quilombola communities in developing agriculture, in addition to conflicts with farmers in their regions and the impossibility of requesting social and urban policies to improve living conditions, such as urban infrastructure for energy, water and sewage networks.

The transfer of ownership ceremony took place in the old farmhouse, where in the basement are found the ruins of what was a slave quarters with two small, dark chambers used in centuries-old acts of torture and deprivation of slaves...

== Culture ==
Traditional Peoples or Traditional Communities are groups that have a culture distinct from the predominant local culture, maintaining a way of life closely linked to the natural environment in which they live. Through their own forms of social organization, use of territory and natural resources (with a subsistence relationship ), their socio-cultural-religious reproduction utilizes knowledge transmitted orally and in daily practice.

Walking through the site is to encounter the history of the country. There are ruins of a sugar mill, another large house, and large vats where slaves and descendants of quilombos prepared palm oil. Around the property there are guard posts and cannons installed during the colonial period for the defense of the site during the golden age of slave labor exploitation and sugarcane planting.
