= Parish Church of Saint Bartholomew =

Church in Maragogipe, Brazil

- Igreja Matriz de São Bartolomeu
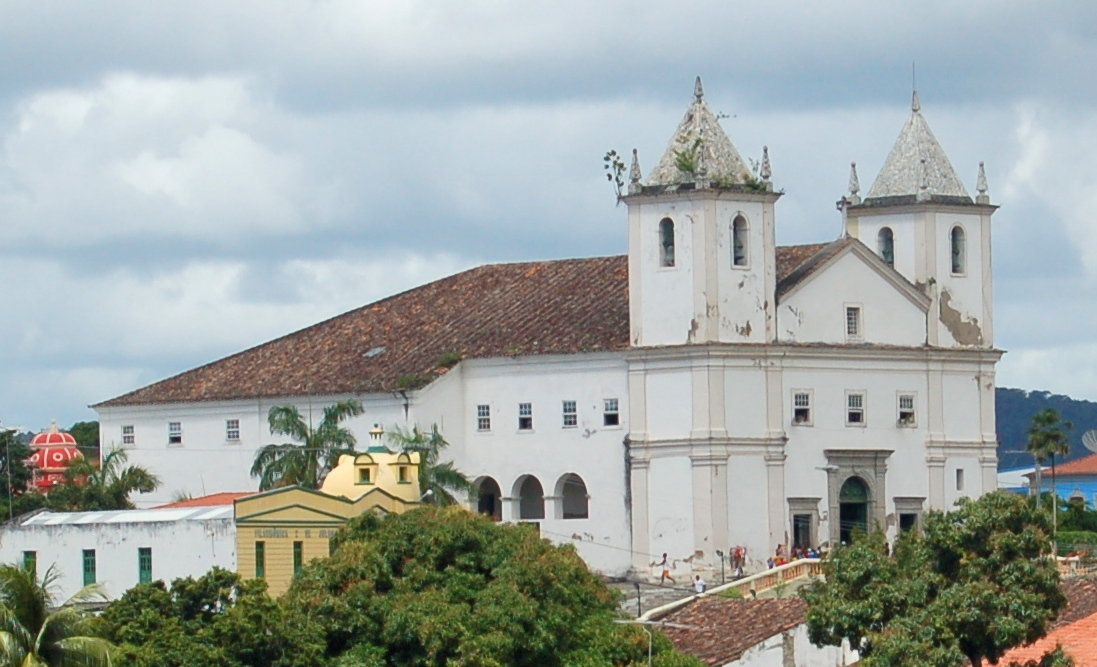
- Parish Church of Saint Bartholomew

- Location of the Parish Church of Saint Bartholomew in Brazil

Religion
- Affiliation: Catholic
- Rite: Roman
- Ownership: Roman Catholic Archdiocese of São Salvador da Bahia

Location
- Municipality: Maragogipe
- State: Bahia
- Country: Brazil
- Coordinates: 12.778722°S 38.919417°W

Architecture
- Style: Baroque
- Established: 17th century

Specifications
- Direction of façade: West
- Elevation: 23.8 m (78 ft)

National Historic Heritage of Brazil
- Designated: 1941
- Reference no.: 227

The Parish Church of Saint Bartholomew (Portuguese: Igreja Matriz de São Bartolomeu) is a 17th-century Roman Catholic church located in Maragogipe, Bahia, Brazil. The church is dedicated to Bartholomew the Apostle and belongs to the Roman Catholic Archdiocese of São Salvador da Bahia.

The church is one of the most important in Bahia; the 17th-century structure "served as a model for the churches with side aisles and two-tower façades in the following century." Its construction of lateral corridors and a monumental façade, along with two towers, spread across the region in the 18th century. It was a design especially favored by parish churches and headquarters of the irmandades, or Catholic brotherhoods. The church was listed as a historic structure by the National Historic and Artistic Heritage Institute in 1941.

== History ==
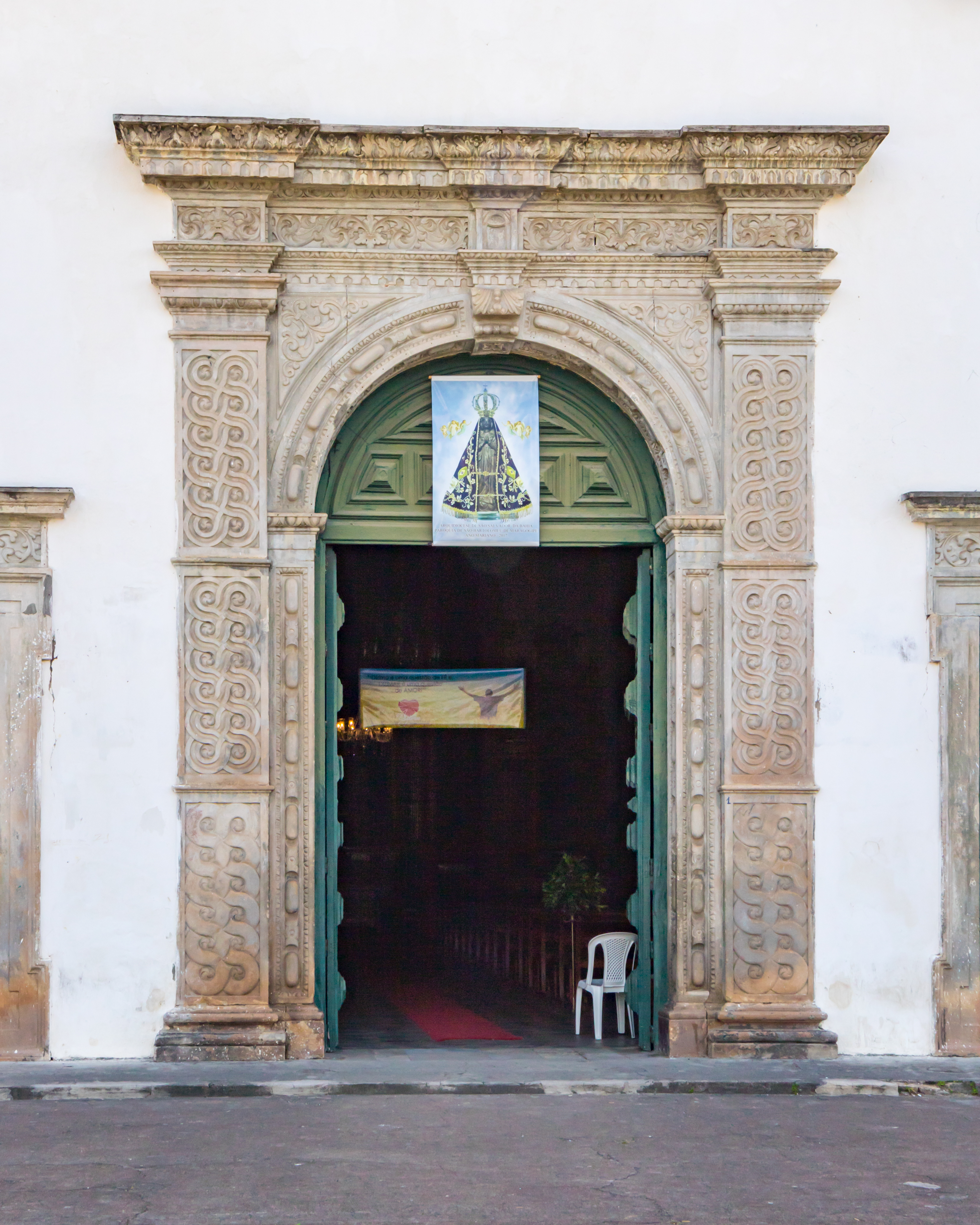
Central portal, Parish Church of Saint Bartholomew

The Parish of São Bartolomeu de Maragogipe was established in 1640, and a chapel soon followed. It soon proved inadequate, "[...] limited, and ruined, and unable to celebrate Divine Offices in it". Bartolomeu Gato de Castro began construction a church for the parish in the middle of the 17th century. Gato de Castro dedicated the church to Saint Bartholomew rather than São Gonçalo, the patron saint of the settlement. Residents of the settlement financed the construction of the church; the parish also received 70,000 cruzados from the Portuguese crown. A conflict between residents of a Tupinamba settlement to the south of Maragogipe occurred in 1655; the son of Gato de Castro was killed by an arrows to the chest.

The date of its consecration is disputed. One hypothesis is 1680, the year cited in an 18th-century document by B. de Barros. This dated is corroborated by the design its rectangular pediment, two towers crowned with a pyramid, and three portals of the same style as portals of the now-demolished Old Cathedral of Salvador (Antiga Sé) of Salvador. These elements, along with the façade, are typical of Bahian churches of the last quarter of the seventeenth century. The original doors of the church are decorated in the style of an old palace gate. The same design is found at the Cathedral of Salvador. The doors were removed from the church at Maragogipe and transported to the façade of the Ministry of National Education of Bahia. They bear the date of 1674.

== Location ==
The Parish Church of Saint Bartholomew is located at the highest point of a small peninsula that sits on the Paraguaçu River in the interior of the Baía de Todos os Santos.

The church faces west and is surrounded by a garden and two squares. In front of it there is a small paved churchyard with a large cross. The churchyard offers a view of much of Maragogipe, including mangroves and hills in the distance. The rear of the church faces a small square, which features a Neo-classical gazebo built in the 20th century. Several single-story houses surround the square.

== Structure ==
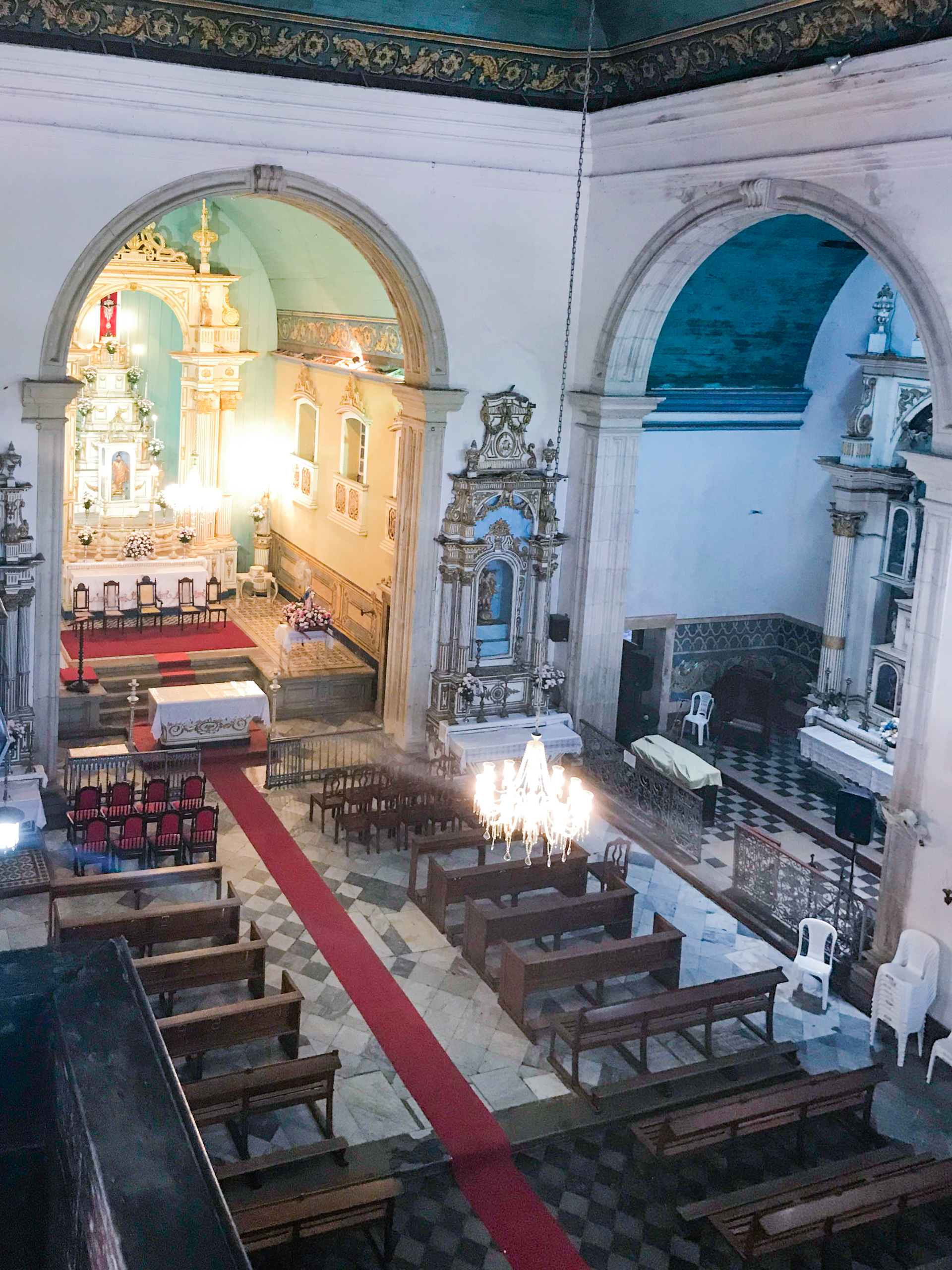
Interior view, Parish Church of Saint Bartholomew

The Parish Church of Saint Bartholomew consists of a rectangular complex of masonry and lime of "large proportions". It has a roof three slopes. The façade is flanked by bell towers to the left and right; the bell towers correspond to the lateral arcades and tribunes of the interior. The belfries have pyramid pediments covered with tiles and azulejos, a feature found in other churches in Salvador and the Recôncavo region. The simple rectangular pediment of the façade is similar to that of the Old Cathedral of Salvador (Antiga Sé) and Church of Saint Antony of Barra, both constructed or significantly altered in the 16th century.

The church has an ornate, square stone portal with pilasters decorated with an intertwined geometric pattern, simple capitals, and a cornice and panels with floral designs. A keystone at center of the arch has an acanthus design at front and a square with a floral design below. The ornate, carved wood doors of the Parish Church of Saint Bartholomew were removed in the 19th century; they were replaced with green doors with a simple green tympanum in wood above.

The floor plan is of a Latin cross with lateral arcades supporting tribunes. The nave has a central aisle with two side aisles. The chancel is flanked by sacristies to the left and right; access to the sacristies is from the chancel. The chancel and nave are divided by a simple chancel arch of stone; it lacks the decoration and cartouche found in churches of the 18th century. The interior of the church has carvings in both the rococo and neoclassical style. The church also holds a rich collection of images, furniture, and silver religious objects.

=== Lateral chapels ===
The church has two large lateral chapels, a feature found in few churches outside of the city of Salvador. Each lateral chapel has an arch identical to the chancel arch. The lateral chapels have large-scale altars; each has a low altar rail and a portal to the sacristy.

== Festival ==
A festival dedicated to St. Bartholomew occurs in August.

== Protected status ==
The Parish Church of Saint Bartholomew was listed as a historic structure by the National Institute of Historic and Artistic Heritage in 1941. Both the structure and its contents were included in the IPHAN directive under inscription number 227.

== Access ==
The Parish Church of Saint Bartholomew is open to the public and may be visited.
