= Barra Lighthouse =

Lighthouse in Bahia, Brazil

Farol da Barra
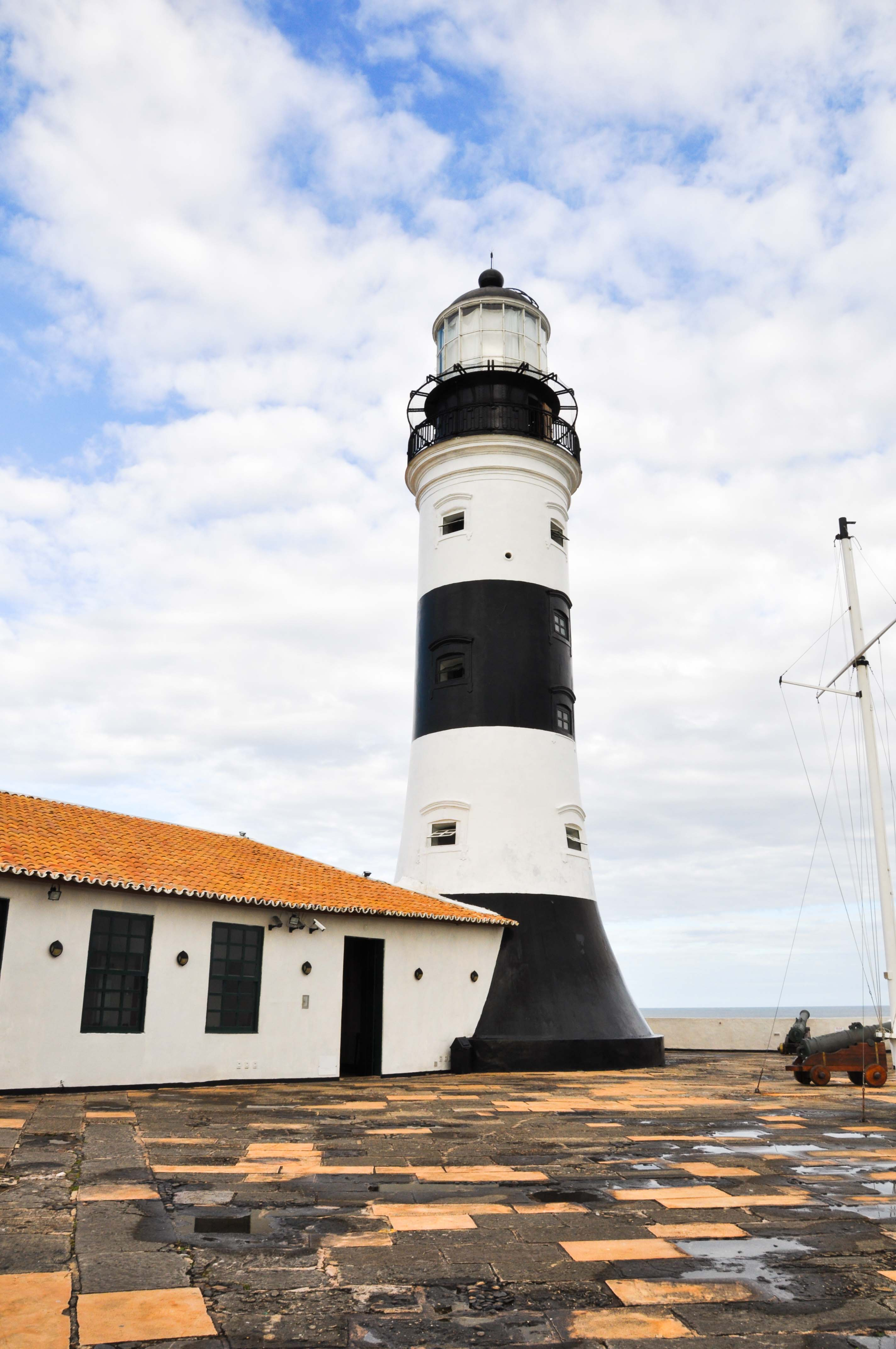
- Barra Lighthouse, Salvador, Brazil
- Location: Salvador, Bahia, Brazil
- Coordinates: 13.0103°S 38.5328°W

Tower
- Height: 22 metres (72 ft)
- Shape: conical tower
- Heritage: heritage asset listed by IPHAN

Light
- First lit: first tower, 17th century; second tower, 1839
- Focal height: 39 m (128 ft)
- Lens: 1890: Fresnel lens
- Range: 16 nautical miles; 29 kilometres (18 mi)
- Characteristic: Fl(3) WR 30s

The Barra Lighthouse (Portuguese: Farol da Barra) also known as the Santo Antônio Lighthouse (Portuguese: Farol de Santo Antônio), is a lighthouse in Salvador, Bahia, Brazil. It is located at the tip of the Padrão, now the Point of Santo Antônio, to the extreme south of Salvador, at the entrance of the Bay of All Saints. The lighthouse was built at the center of the Santo Antônio da Barra Fort.

The current lighthouse is the second built the site. The first was built of taipa, and was the second built in the Americas, after the old Friborg Palace in Recife. The current structure was built in 1839 and dedicated by Dom Pedro II of Brazil. It is constructed of masonry and painted with black and white bands. The lighthouse is a 22 metres (72 ft)-high tapered tower with a Fresnel lens dating to 1890. The fort and lighthouse were listed as historic structures by the National Historic and Artistic Heritage Institute in 1938.

== First lighthouse ==
The first lighthouse at Barra was built due to the expansion of commerce and slavery in Bahia in the 17th century. The port at Salvador was the principal point of the Atlantic slave trade in Brazil. The region, in turn, exported sugar, cotton, tobacco, and timber to the European consumer market. Galeão Santíssimo Sacramento suffered a tragic shipwreck on May 5, 1668, on the sand bank at the mouth of the Vermelho River due to a lack of a lighthouse in the area. The Fort of Santo Antônio da Barra, which had been rebuilt in 1696 under the government of João de Lencastre (1694–1702), built a quadrangular turret in the fort topped by a glazed bronze lantern. The square shape of the lighthouse, in contrast to the cylindrical structure of today, is seen in Cartas Soteropolitanas in the late 18th century by Luís dos Santos Vilhena. It was powered by whale oil, and came to be called Vigia da Barra or Farol da Barra.

The logbook of the English privateer William Dampier, in 1699, record: "The entrance to the Todos os Santos Bay is defended by the imposing Fort of Santo Antônio, whose lamps are lit and suspended to guide the ships, which we saw at night."

== Second lighthouse ==
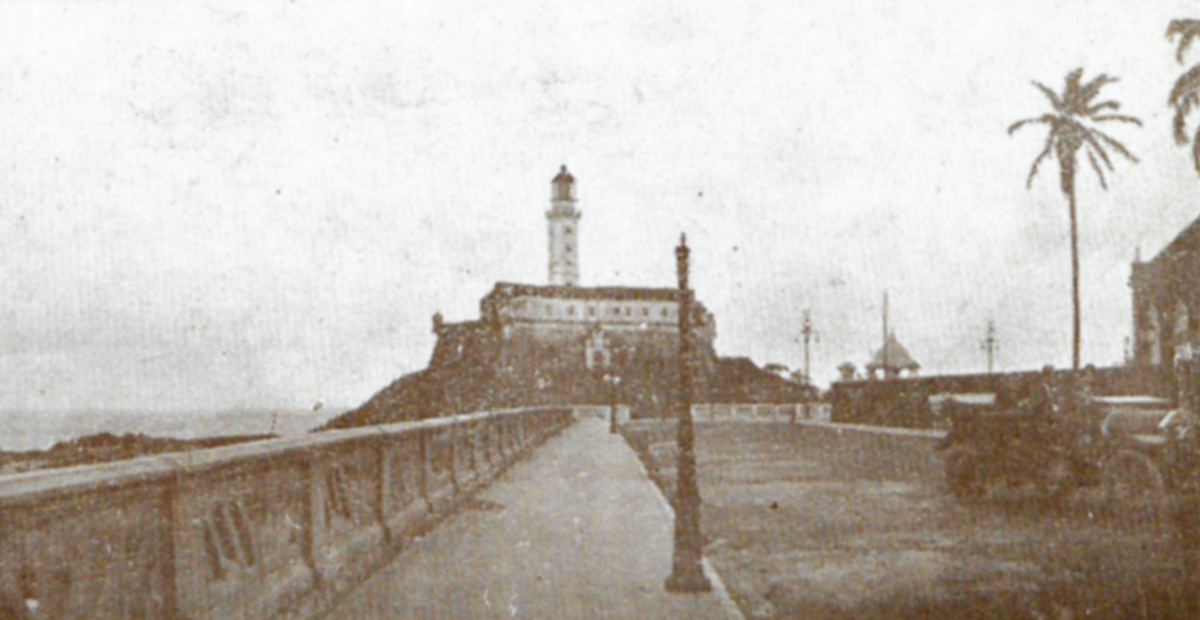
Barra Lighthouse, 1922

After the exit of the Portuguese from Brazil regulatory Decree of July 6, 1832 mandated the installation of a more modern lighthouse at Barra. The government ordered a lighthouse manufactured in England to replace the old one. It was dedicated by Dom Pedro II on December 2, 1839. It had a catoptric reflector, lighted by kerosene, and was visible for eighteen nautical miles in clear weather. The old "Barbier" kerosene incandescent lighting system was replaced by electric light in 1937. The lighthouse, like others in Brazil, is owned by the Brazilian Navy. It is maintained by the Signaling Boating Center "Almirante Moraes Rêgo" (Centro de Auxílios à Navegação Almirante Moraes Rego) (CAMR) of the Hydrography and Navigation Directorate (Diretoria de Hidrografia e Navegacão) (DHN). The Barra Lighthouse is a visual icon of Salvador and references to it appear in literature, art, and film.

== Protected status ==
The Santo Antônio da Barra Fort and the Barra Lighthouse are protected as a historic structures by the National Institute of Historic and Artistic Heritage. The fort was listed as a historic structure in 1938.

== Access ==
The Barra Lighthouse, unlike others in Brazil, is open to the public and may be visited.
