= João Fragoso =

Portuguese painter

- Born: 27 April 1913; Caldas da Rainha, Portugal
- Died: 28 December 2000 (aged 87); Anjos, Portugal
- Occupation: Painter

João Fragoso (27 April 1913 – 28 December 2000) was a Portuguese painter. His work was part of the painting event in the art competition at the 1948 Summer Olympics.
