= Maragogipe =

Municipality of Bahia, Brazil

- Municipality
- Municipality of Maragogipe
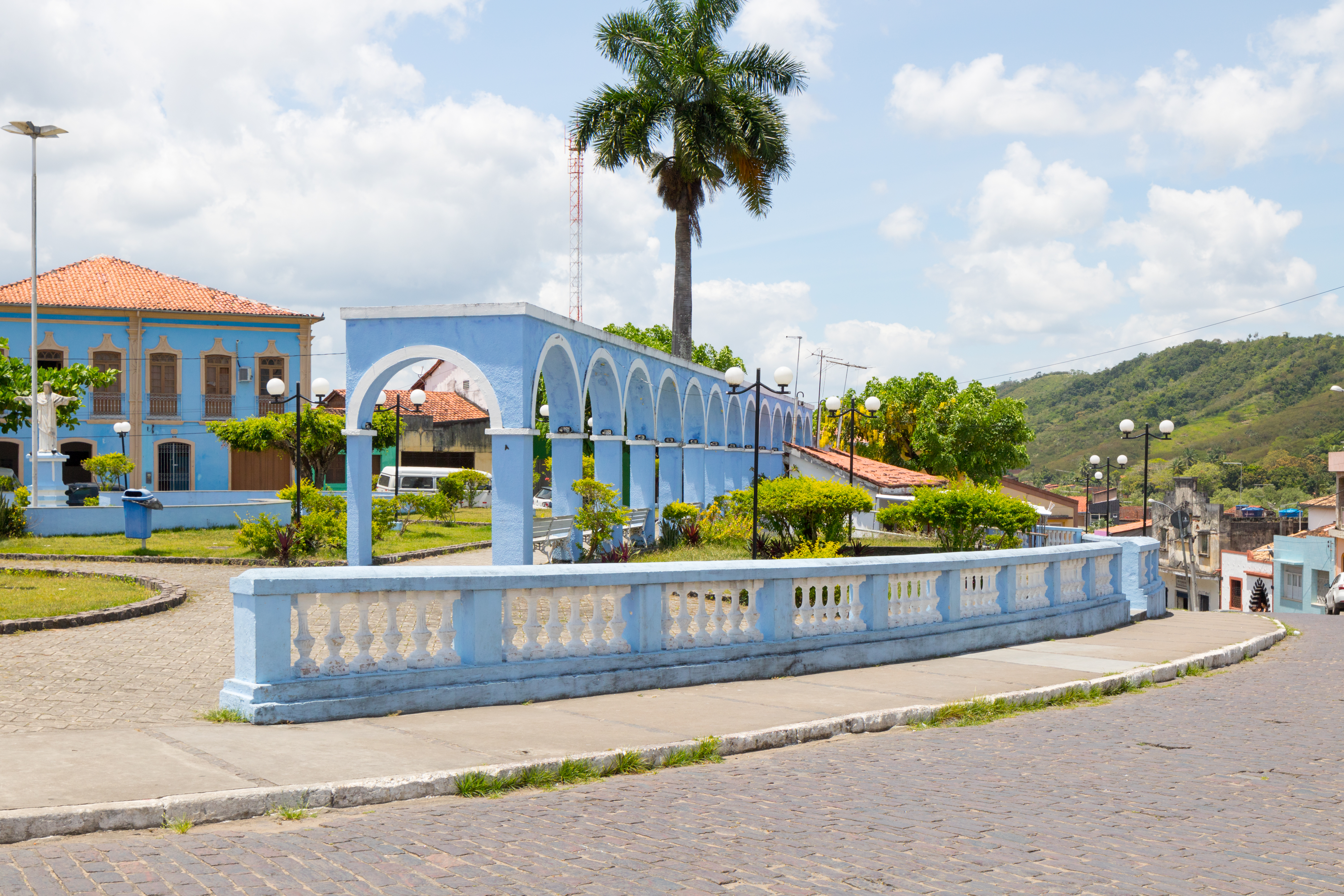
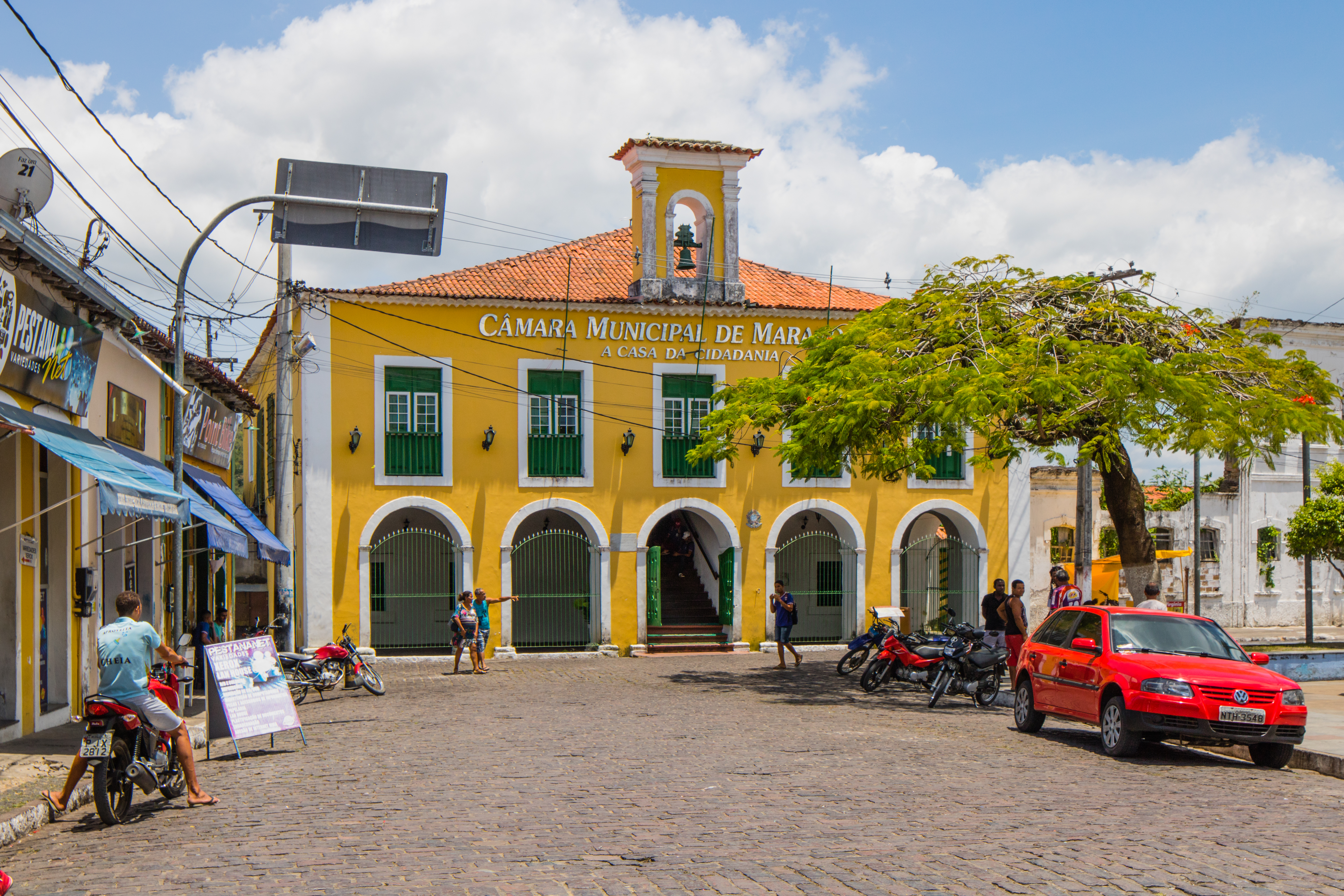
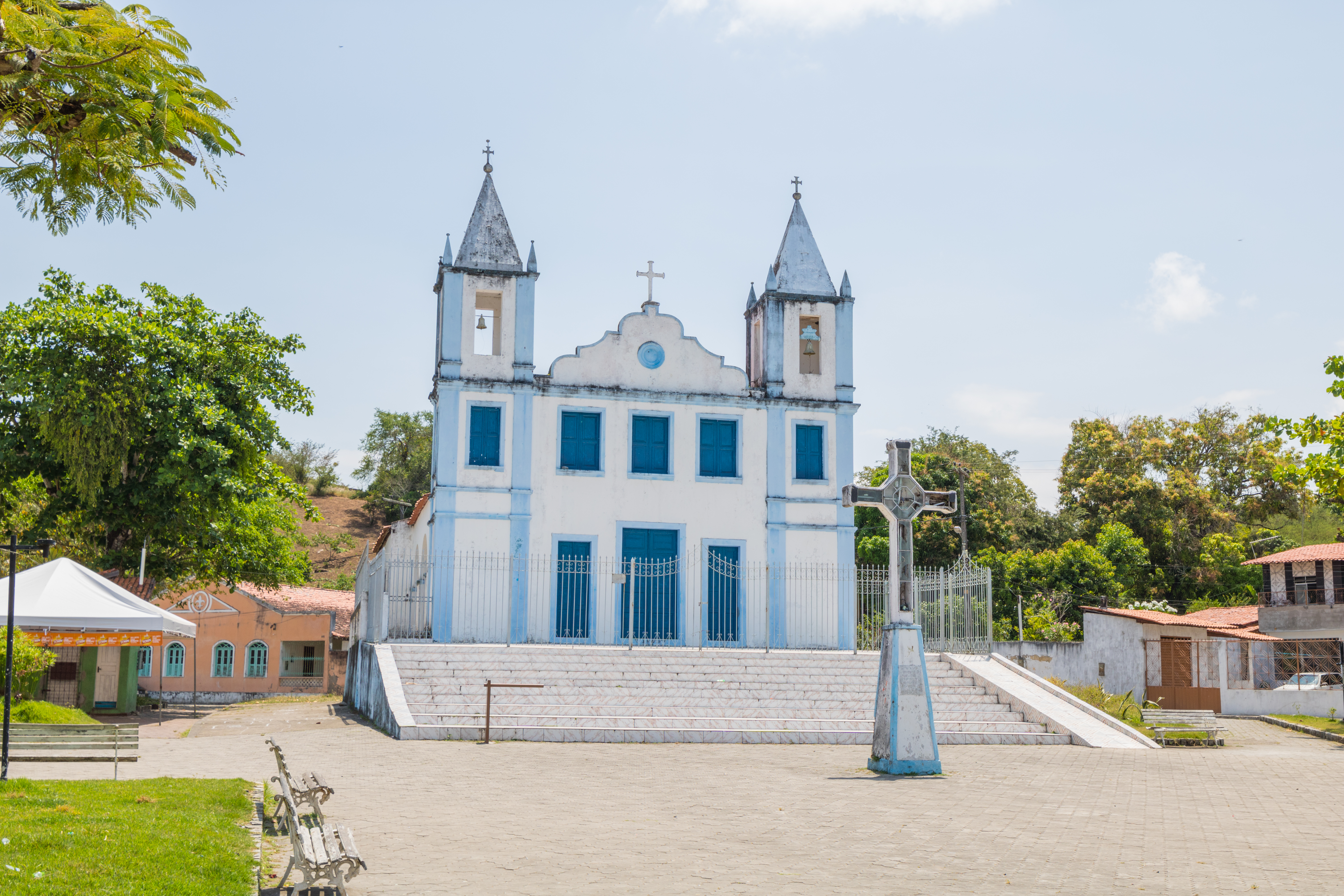
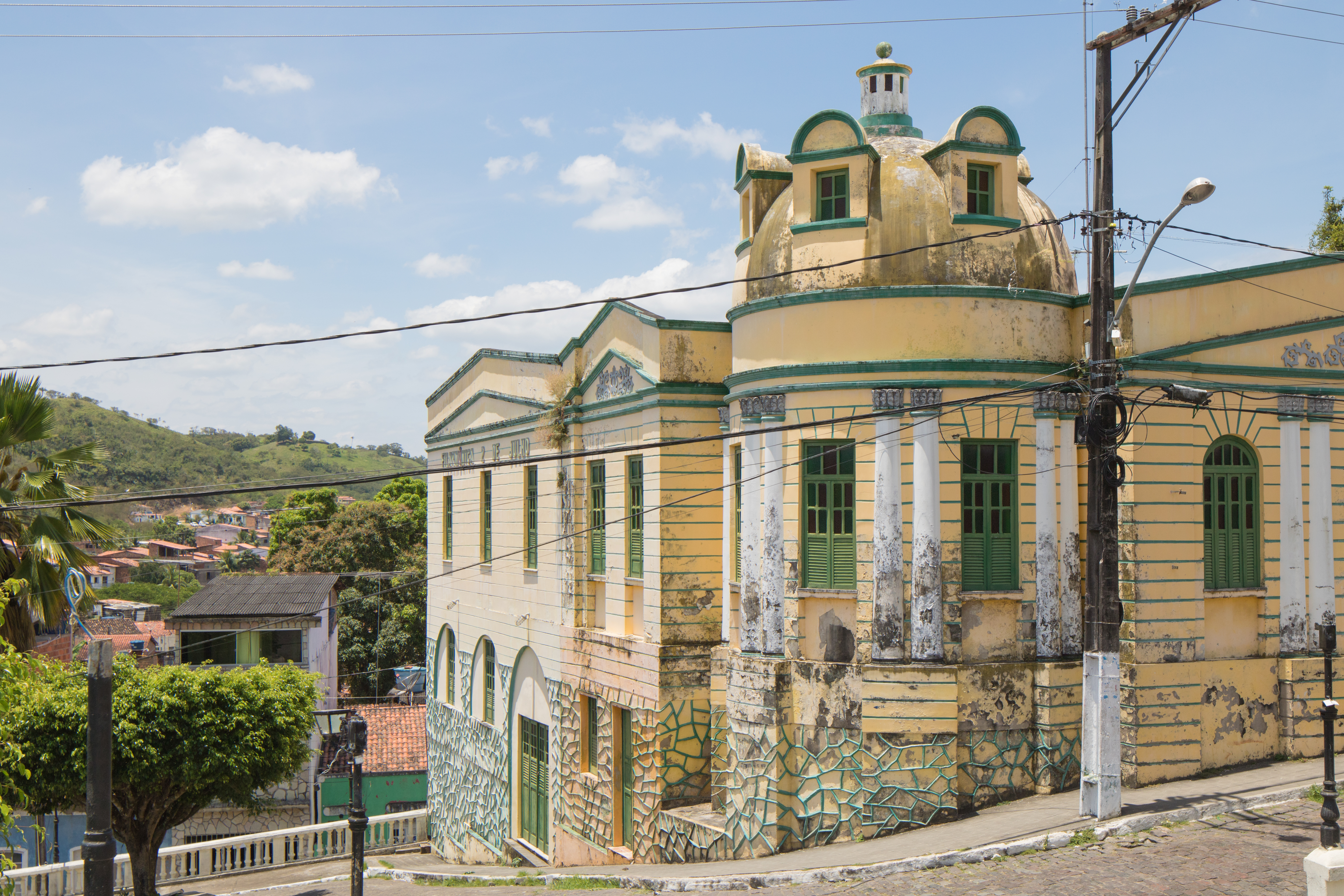
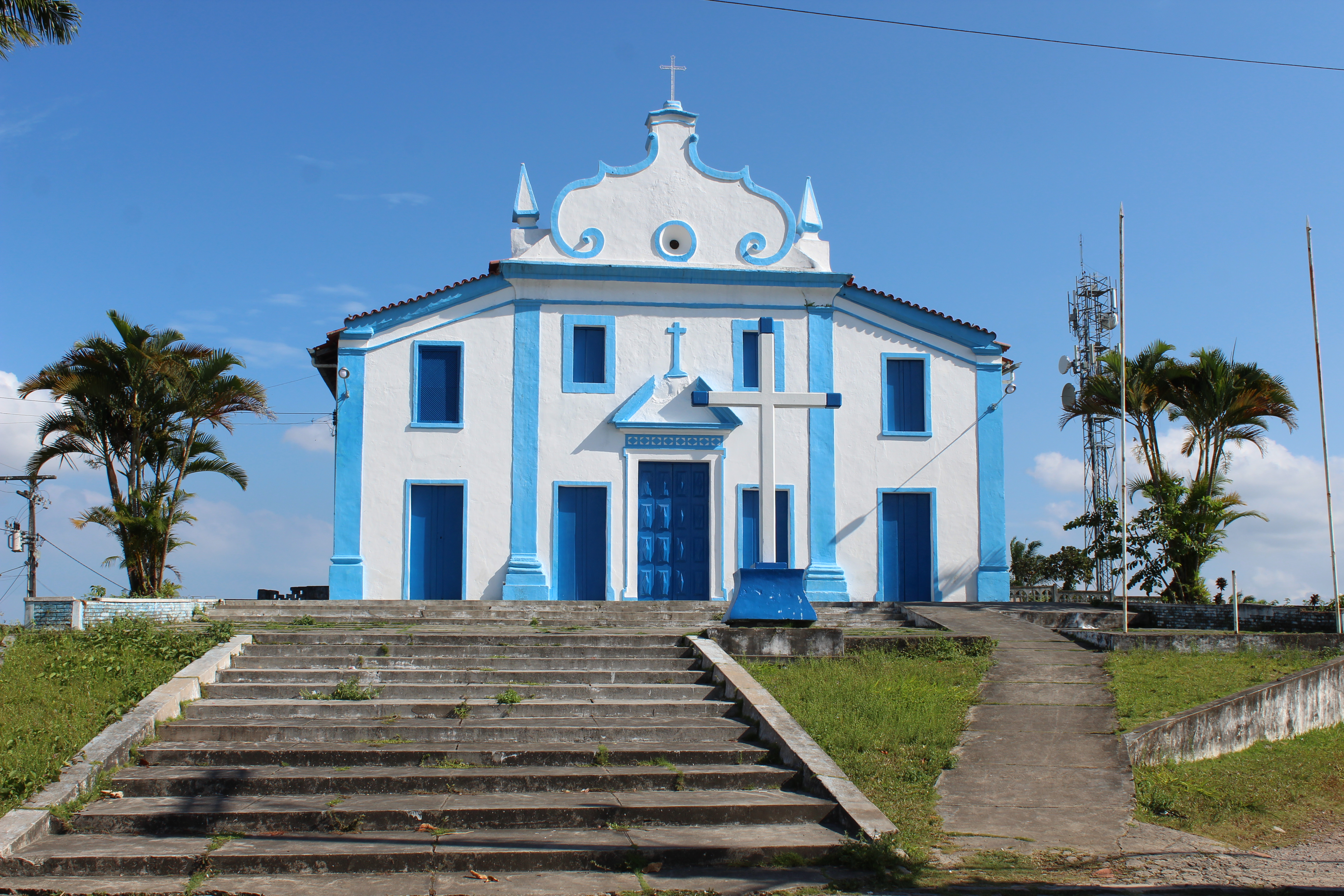
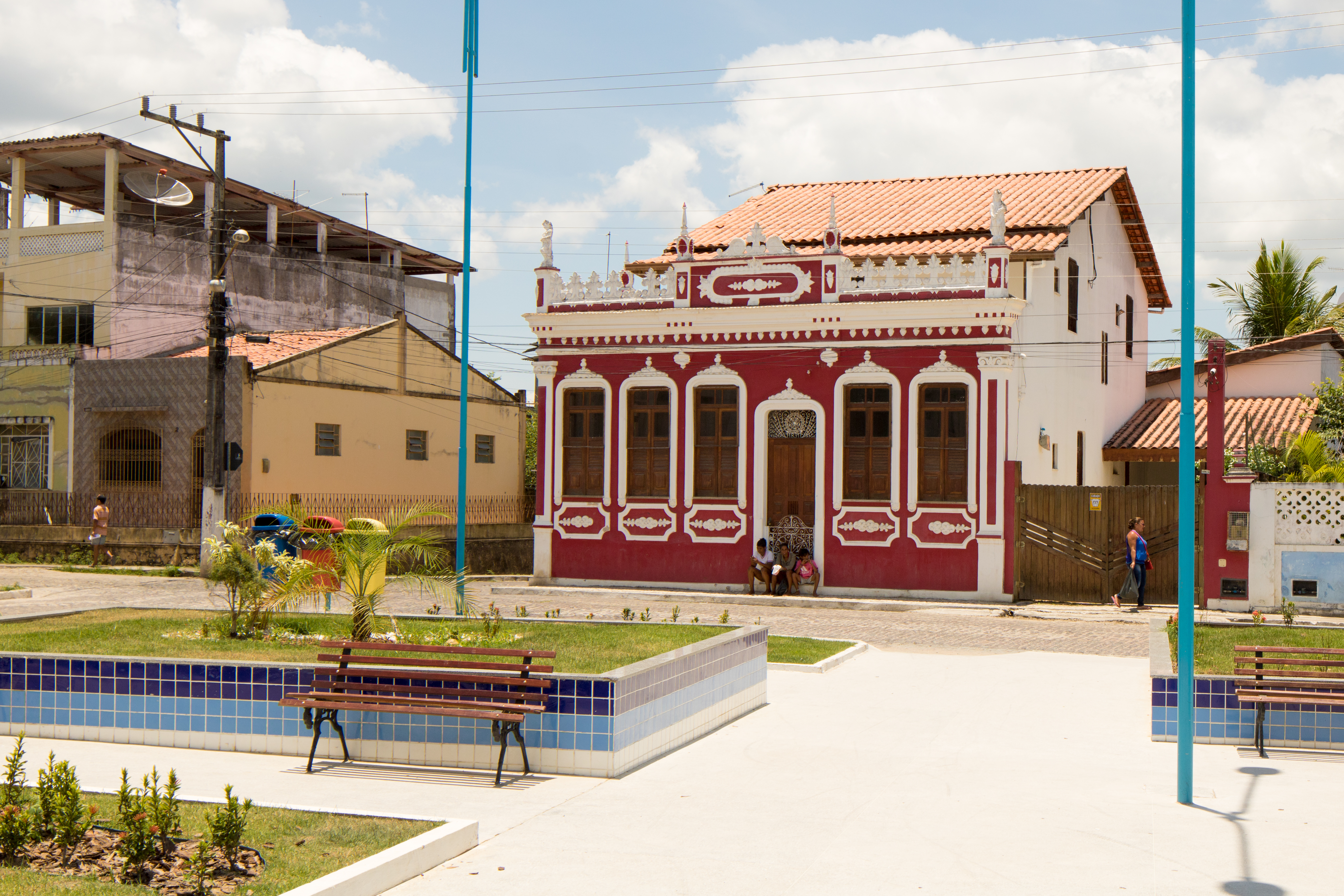

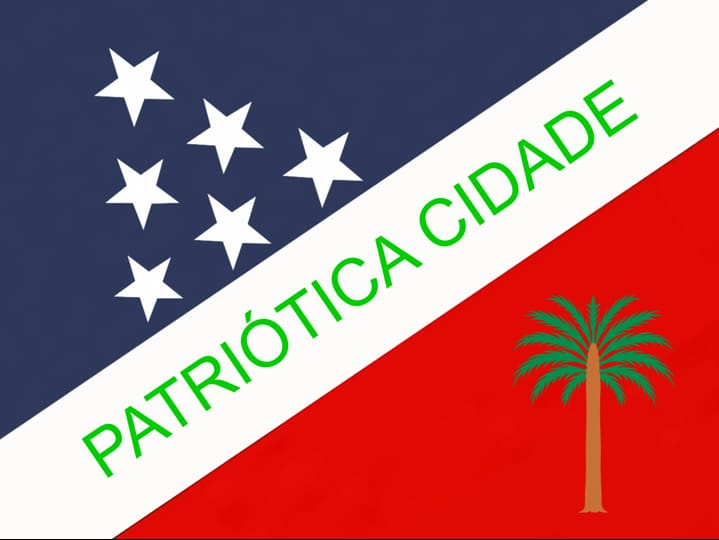
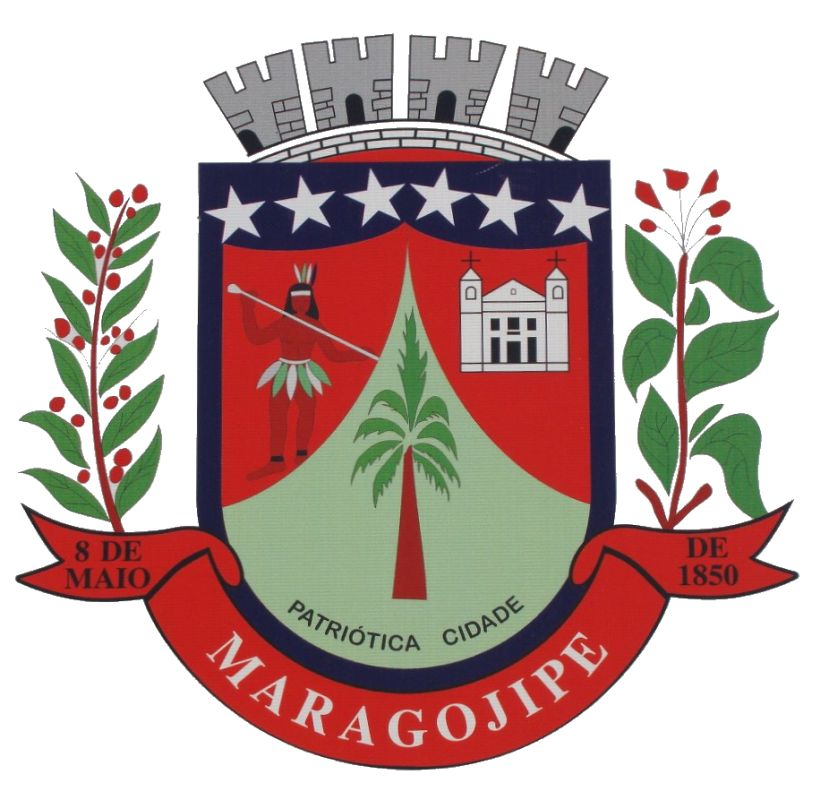
- Flag Coat of arms

- Location in Bahia
- Coordinates: 12.777778°S 38.918889°E
- Country: Brazil
- Region: Northeast
- State: Bahia
- Founded: 1557

Government
  - Mayor: Vera Lucia Maria dos Santos

Area
  - Total: 438.18 km^{2} (169.18 sq mi)

Population (2020 est.)
  - Total: 44,793
  - Density: 102.23/km^{2} (264.76/sq mi)
- Time zone: UTC−3 (BRT)
- HDI (2010): 0.621 – medium
- Website: maragojipe.ba.gov.br#/home

Maragogipe (Brazilian Portuguese: [maɾaɡoˈʒipi]) is a municipality in the state of Bahia in the North-East region of Brazil. Maragogipe covers 438.18 km^{2} (169.18 mi^{2}), and has a population of 44,793 with a population density of 110 inhabitants per square kilometer. Maragogipe is located 130 km (81 mi) from the state capital of Bahia, Salvador. It borders the Paraguaçu River, 20 km (12 mi) upstream from Baía de Todos os Santos. Maragogipe was a major center of sugar cane and tobacco production, and became home to large slave-holding plantations. After the abolition of slavery in Brazil in 1888 the Afro-Brazilian population lived as tenant laborers until recently as "21st century slaves", unable to fish or grow staple crops.

The municipality contains a large portion of the Baía do Iguape Marine Extractive Reserve, created in 2000. Maragogipe is home to an extensive system of mangroves along the Paraguaçu and the Bay of Iguape. The Quilombo Salamina Putumuju, a quilombo settlement of 200 people within the reserve, was recognized by the Palmares Cultural Foundation in December 2004.

== Districts ==
Maragogipe is divided into six districts:

- Maragogipe, the seat of the municipality
- Coqueiros
- Guaí
- Guapira
- Nagé
- São Roque do Paraguaçu

== History ==
The Amerindian population in the current Maragogipe area were called the Marag-gyp, or warrior of "invincible arms". They lived a semi-nomadic life that included both farming and hunting. They were masters of the bow and arrow and in the use of the tarayra, a heavy ironwood ax used for decapitation. The Portuguese explored the area as early as the 1520s, and invaded the early 16th century. They were attracted by the abundance of timber and easy maritime accessibility of the Paraguacu River and Bay of Iguape.

Duarte da Costa (died 1560), the second governor of Brazil, granted his son Álvaro da Costa land on the Paraguaçu River region. The grant dates to January 16, 1557. The land became a captaincy on March 28, 1566. The indigenous population resisted the Portuguese; 200 members of the indigenous settlement were never subjugated. Numerous sugarcane plantation appeared in the region in the 1570s; the Portuguese also extracted timber and grew cassava. They also established sugar and flour mills. The peninsula that extends into the Paraguaçu River and Bay of Iguape, largely surrounded by mangroves, formed a strategic point to protect the Paraguaçu region; for this reason, a settlement was founded, later called Maragogipe. São Bartolomeu, a small parish, was established in the mid-17th century. It was separated from Ajuda de Jaguaripe, now the municipality of Jaugaripe, in 1724. A great drought occurred in the same year. The settlement was located at the mouth of the river where is opens to the Iguape, but moved in the mid-17th century to its current location on higher ground. The town served as one of many ports to facilitate commerce along the Paraguaçu; the settlement was on the busy transportation route between Cachoeira to the northeast and Salvador to the west.

A town hall and prison appeared in the 18th century. King José I of Portugal bought the captaincy in 1733. Its population by 1759 was 5,684 among 886 homes. A roads inland to São Félix was built in 1807, and regular steamboat service connected Maragogipe and Salvador by 1839. Maragogipe was raised to city status in 1850.

== Baía do Iguape Marine Extractive Reserve ==
Maragogipe contains 39% of the 10,074 hectares (24,890 acres) Baía do Iguape Marine Extractive Reserve, created in 2000. Maragogipe is home to an extensive system of mangroves along the Paraguaçu and the Bay of Iguape.

== Protected sites ==
Maragogipe is home to numerous historic structures and Candomblé terreiros, or temples. Those protected by the federal government include:

- Fort of Paraguassú (Forte do Paraguassú)
- Parish Church of Saint Bartholomew (Igreja Matriz de São Bartolomeu)
- Town Hall (Paço Municipal)
- São Roque Plantation and Chapel (São Roque, Casa Grande e Capela)
- Terreiro Banda Lecongo

== See also ==
- List of municipalities in Bahia
