= Forte de Santo Antônio da Barra =

Fort and museum in Salvador, Brazil

- Salvador, Bahia in Brazil
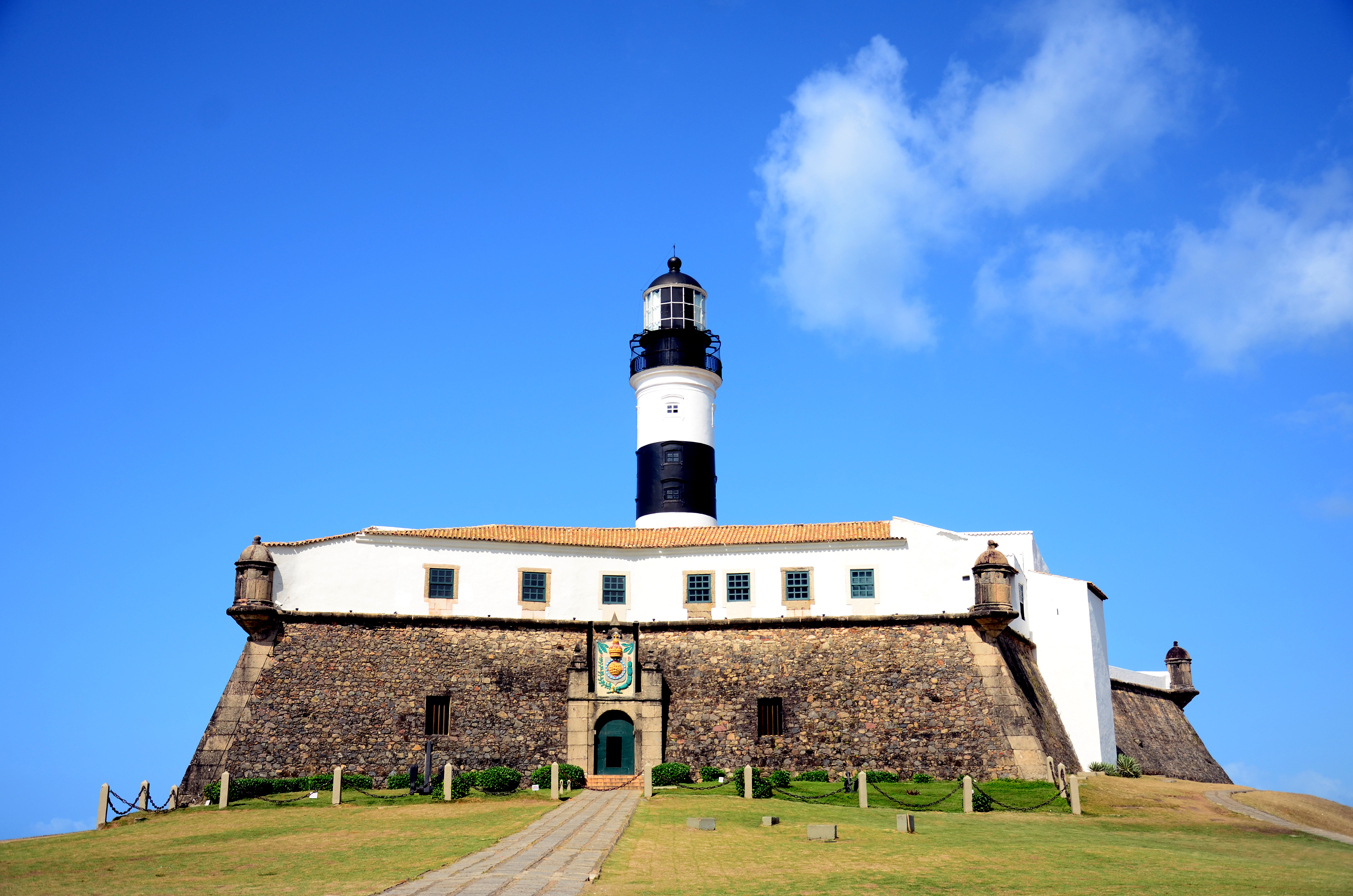
- Lighthouse at Forte de Santo Antônio da Barra

Site information
- Type: Fort

Location
- Location of Forte de Santo Antônio da Barra in Brazil
- Coordinates: 13.010278°S 38.532778°W

Site history
- Built: 1702

National Historic Heritage of Brazil
- Designated: 1938
- Reference no.: 155

Forte de Santo Antônio da Barra is a fort located in Salvador, Bahia, Brazil. It was constructed to guard the entrance to the Bay of All Saints, during the time of the Portuguese Empire. The first Portuguese fortification erected in Bahia was likely built in 1501, in the same area now occupied by the Forte de Santo Antônio da Barra. The foundation stone of that first fortification was placed in an area called Ponta do Padrão, now known as the Largo do Farol da Barra, the broad public square in front of the fort. The fort also houses the 22 metres (72 ft)-high Barra Lighthouse and the Nautical Museum of Bahia. The Santo Antônio da Barra Fort is protected as a historic structures by the National Institute of Historic and Artistic Heritage.

== History ==
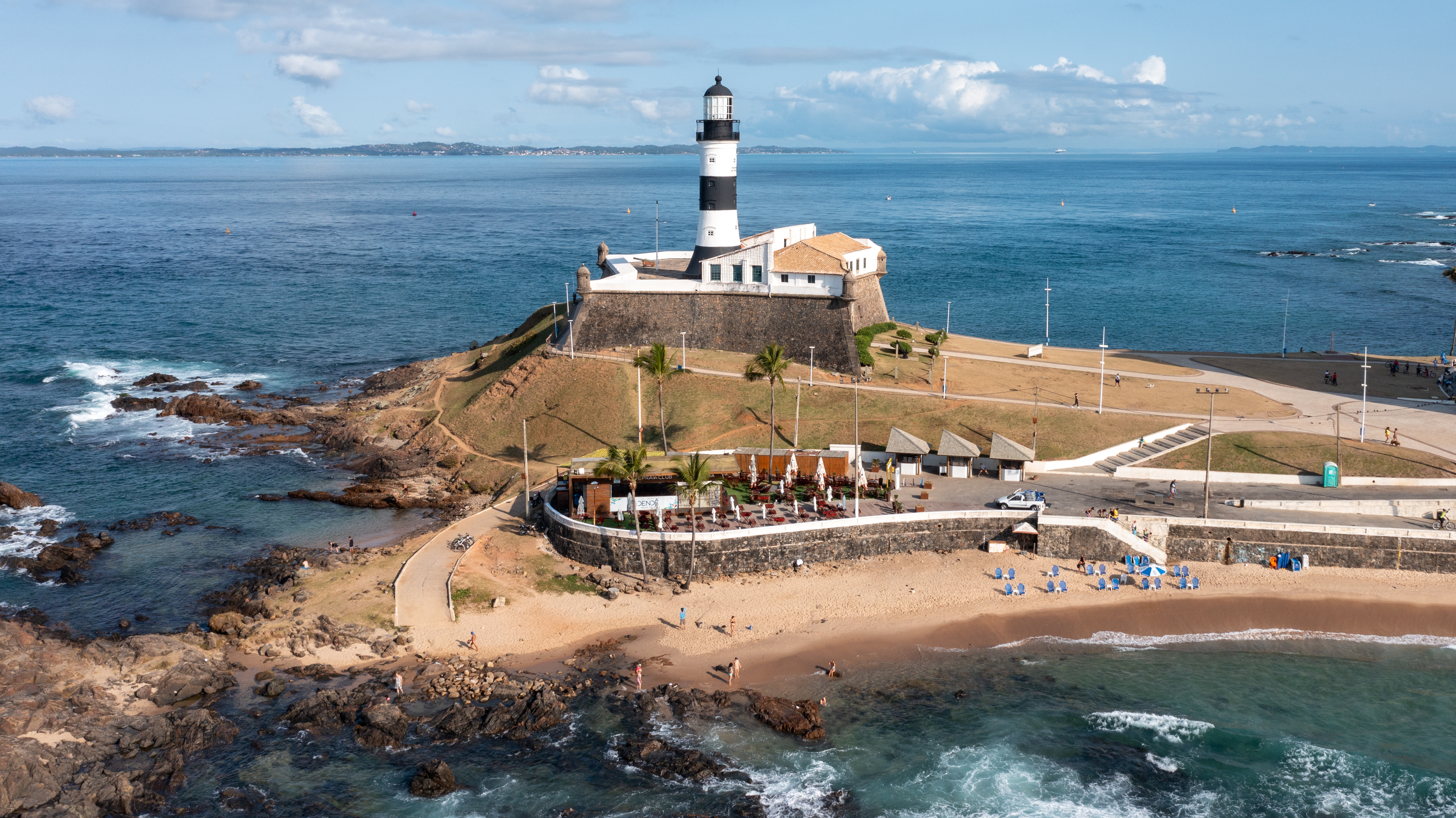
Aerial view

In 1549, in order to solve the governance problem of his South American colonies, King John III of Portugal established the Governorate General of Brazil. The eighth Governor General, Manoel Teles Barreto (served 1583-1587), had a more substantive fortification built at the site. That structure, likely of rammed earth, was in the shape of an octagon. The tenth Governor General, Francisco de Souza (served 1591-1602), reinforced the fortification with stone and mortar; its design was similar to the 16th-century Small Fort of Our Lady of Monserrate.

In 1621, King Philip II of Portugal divided the Governorate General of Brazil into two states, with the site of the Forte de Santo Antônio da Barra located in the northern of the two, the State of Maranhão. Governor General João de Lencastre (served 1694-1702) altered the plan of the site, hiring the military engineer José Paes Esteves to convert the fortification into a star-shaped polygon. A lighthouse was placed in the fort in the same period.

== Barra Lighthouse ==
The Barra Lighthouse (Portuguese: Farol da Barra), also known as the Santo Antônio Lighthouse (Portuguese: Farol de Santo Antônio), was built in the center of the fort in the 17th century. The primitive structure was replaced in 1839 by a structure built in England. It was dedicated by Dom Pedro II of Brazil. The lighthouse is a 22 metres (72 ft)-high tapered tower constructed of masonry and painted with black and white bands.

== Protected status ==
The Santo Antônio da Barra Fort is protected as a historic structure by the National Institute of Historic and Artistic Heritage. The fort and lighthouse were listed as a historic structure in 1938.

== Access ==
The Santo Antônio da Barra Fort is open to the public and may be visited.

== See also ==
- Military history of Brazil
