= Forte de São Diogo =

- Salvador, Bahia in Brazil
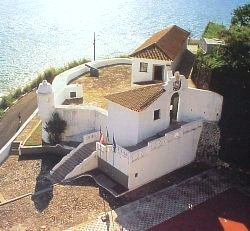
- View of fort from above

Site information
- Type: Fort
- Open to the public: Yes
- Condition: Good

Location
- Location of Forte de São Diogo in Brazil
- Coordinates: 13.001858°S 38.532730°W

Forte de São Diogo is a fort located in Salvador, Bahia Brazil.

== See also ==
- Military history of Brazil
