= The Amazing Race 13 =

Season of television series

- Season 13
- Region 1 DVD cover
- Presented by: Phil Keoghan
- No. of teams: 11
- Winners: Nick and Starr Spangler
- No. of legs: 11
- Distance traveled: 40,000 mi (64,000 km)
- No. of episodes: 11

Release
- Original network: CBS
- Original release: September 28 – December 7, 2008

Additional information
- Filming dates: April 22 – May 14, 2008

Series chronology
- ← Previous; Season 12 Next → Season 14

The Amazing Race 13 is the thirteenth season of the American reality competition show The Amazing Race. Hosted by Phil Keoghan, it featured eleven teams of two, each with a pre-existing relationship, competing in a race around the world for US$1,000,000. This season visited five continents and eight countries, traveling approximately 40,000 miles (64,000 km) over eleven legs. Starting in Los Angeles, California, racers traveled through Brazil, Bolivia, New Zealand, Cambodia, India, Kazakhstan, and Russia, before returning to the United States and finishing in Portland, Oregon. The season premiered on CBS on September 28, 2008, and concluded on December 7, 2008.

Siblings Nick and Starr Spangler were the winners of this season, while former NFL safety Ken Greene and his wife Tina finished in second place, and fraternity brothers Andrew Lappitt and Dan Honig finished in third place.

== Format ==
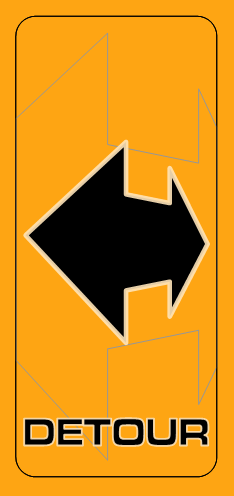
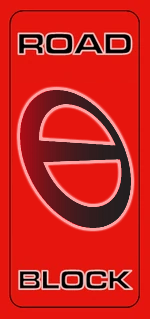
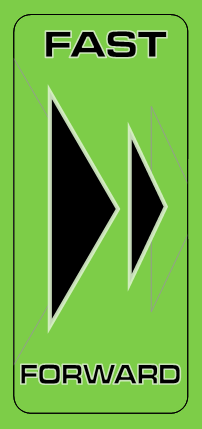
The clues which contestants receive during the course of the race generally fall into five categories: Route Info, Detour, Roadblock, and Fast Forward.

The Amazing Race is a reality television show created by Bertram van Munster and Elise Doganieri, and hosted by Phil Keoghan. The series follows teams of two competing in a race around the world. Each leg of the race requires teams to deduce clues, navigate foreign environments, interact with locals, perform physical and mental challenges, and travel on a limited budget provided by the show. At each stop during the leg, teams receive clues inside sealed envelopes, which fall into one of these categories:

- Route Info: These are simple instructions that teams must follow before they can receive their next clue.
- Detour: A Detour is a choice between two tasks. Teams may choose either task and switch tasks if they find one option too difficult. There is usually one Detour present on each leg.
- Roadblock: A Roadblock is a task that only one team member can complete. Teams must choose which member will complete the task based on a brief clue they receive before fully learning the details of the task. There is usually one Roadblock present on each leg.
- Fast Forward: A Fast Forward is a task that only one team may complete, which allows that team to skip all remaining tasks on the leg and go directly to the next Pit Stop. Teams may only claim one Fast Forward during the entire race.
- Speed Bump: Teams who were spared elimination by finishing in last place on a non-elimination leg are required to complete a Speed Bump: an additional task in the following leg that the other teams did not have to complete.

Most teams who arrive last at the Pit Stop of each leg are progressively eliminated, while the first team to arrive at the finish line in the final episode wins the grand prize of US$1,000,000.

== Production ==
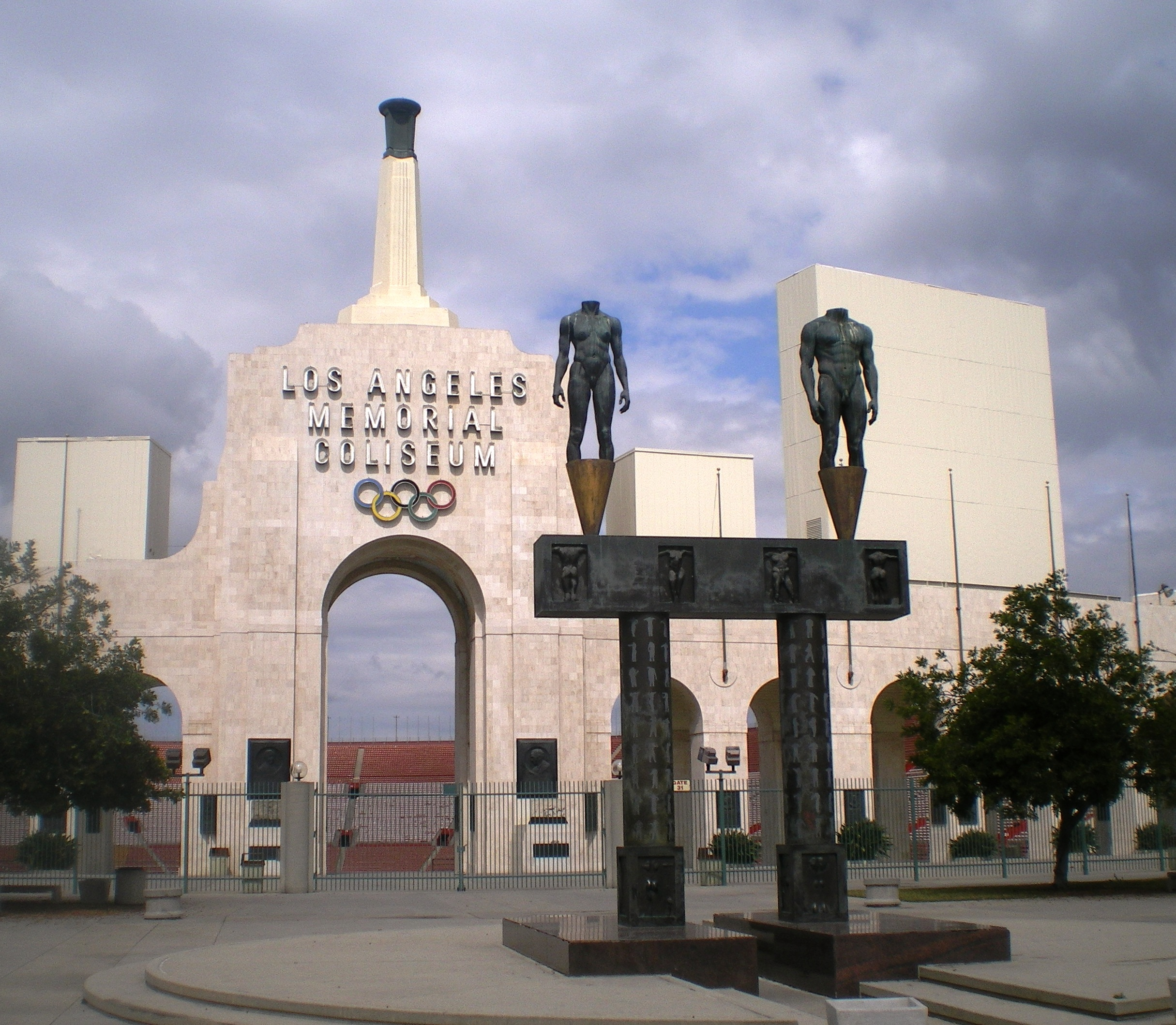
The starting line of The Amazing Race 13 was at the Los Angeles Memorial Coliseum.

CBS had originally planned to only air one installment of The Amazing Race (season 12) in the 2007–08 season, but due to the Writers Guild of America strike, CBS ordered a thirteenth installment as a replacement for programs affected by the strike. CBS greenlit the thirteenth installment on December 9, 2007. Season locations were scouted in January 2008 and filming took place between April and May 2008. The Amazing Race 13 spanned 40,000 miles (64,000 km) in 23 days and visited eight different countries. New locales visited this season were Bolivia, Cambodia, and Kazakhstan.

Toni and Dallas Imbimbo were absent from the finish line because Dallas had misplaced his passport and the team's money in Moscow during the penultimate leg. This was hinted at in promotional materials aired before the season began, where CBS revealed that one team made "an unprecedented mistake that ultimately prohibit[ed] them from joining their fellow Racers at the Finish Line." The passport was eventually turned in at the U.S. Embassy in Russia, but it was still too late for Toni and Dallas to travel to the finish line. Starr Spangler revealed in a post-show interview that they did join the other racers in Portland at a party following the end of the competition.

CBS heavily promoted the new season, including placing advertisements on the top of three hangar buildings at Los Angeles International Airport prior to the premiere. Unlike other seasons, CBS revealed the route map prior to the start of the season.

== Contestants ==
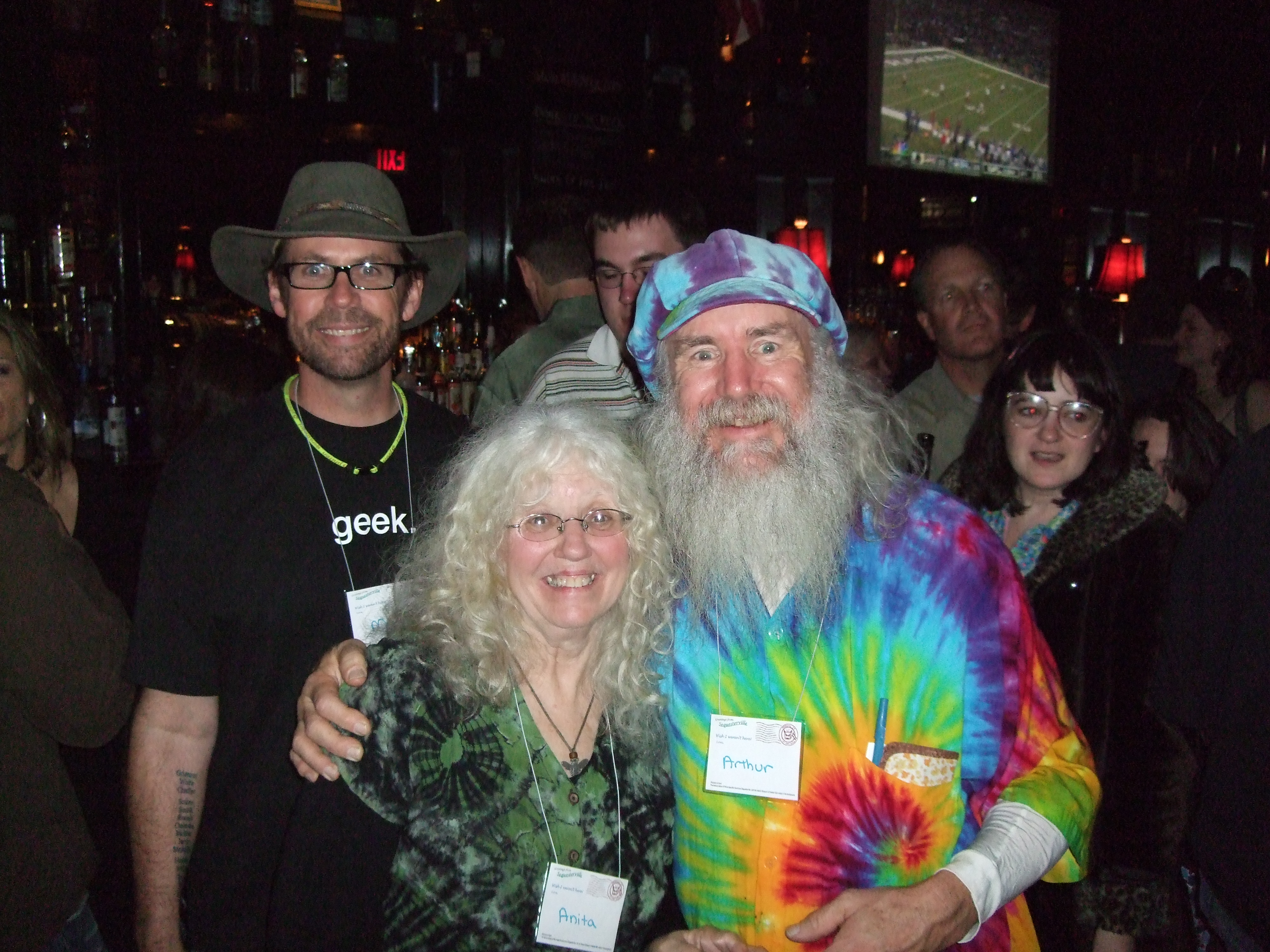
Mark Yturralde and Anita and Arthur Jones

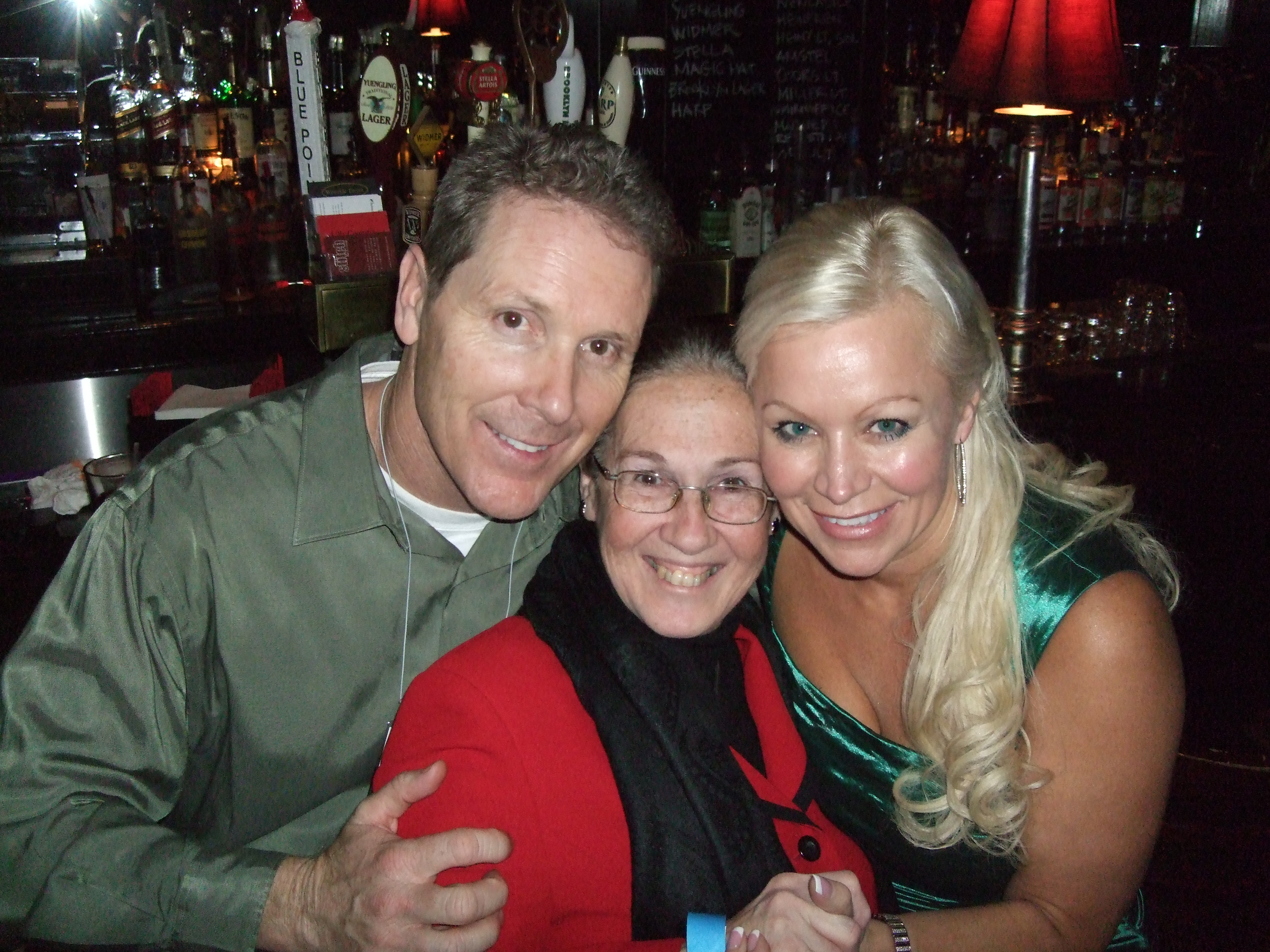
Ken Greene (left) and Tina Greene (right)

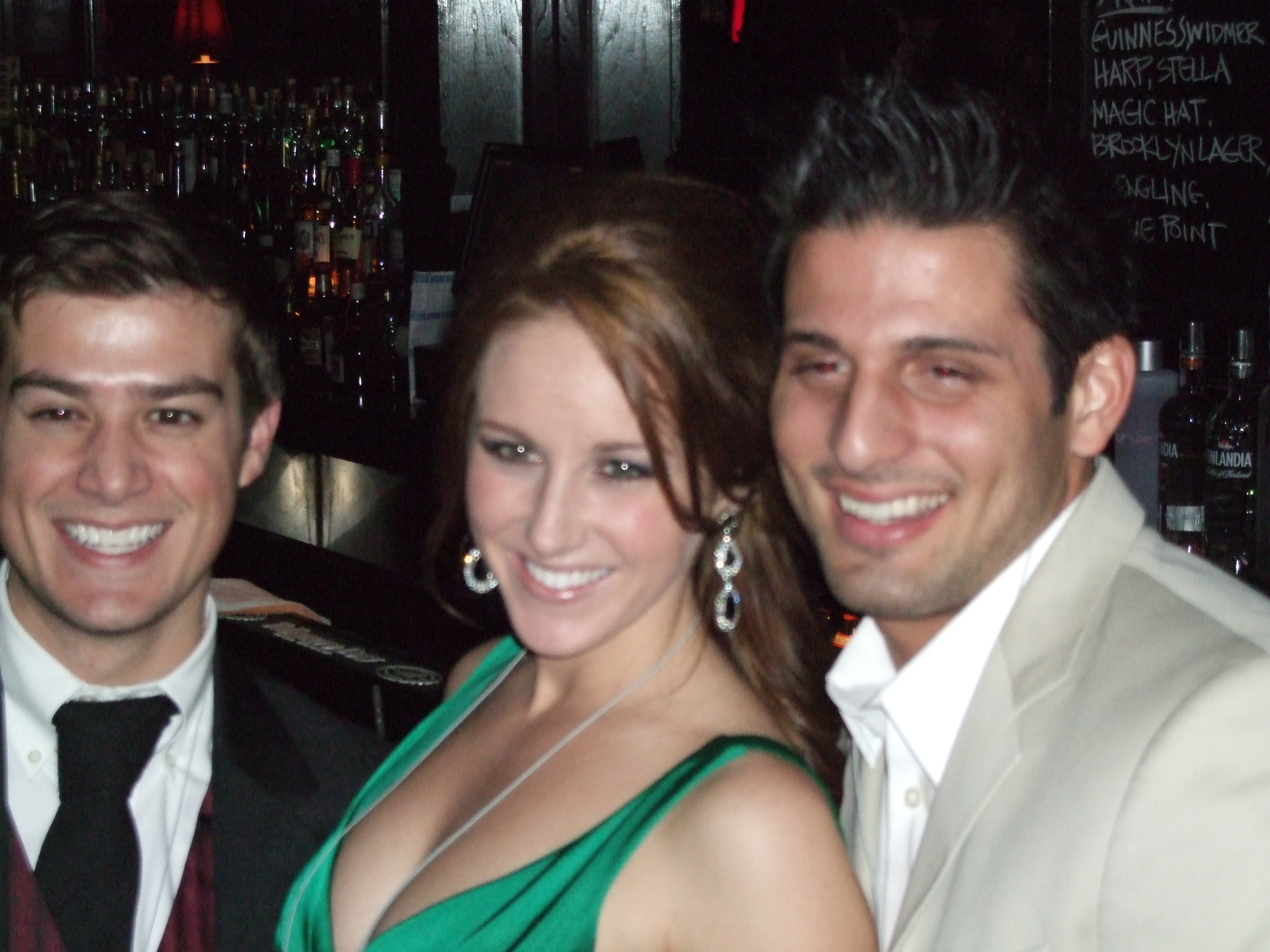
Nick Spangler, Starr Spangler, and Dallas Imbimbo

Ken Greene was a safety for the St. Louis Cardinals and San Diego Chargers before retiring in 1984.

Starr Spangler and Dallas Imbimbo, who had competed on opposing teams, revealed in interviews that they had been dating long-distance for six months since the show finished taping. The two eventually ended their relationship due to the distance.

Contestants	Age	Relationship	Hometown	Status
Anita Jones	63	Married Beekeepers	Eugene, Oregon	Eliminated 1st (in Salvador, Brazil)
Arthur Jones	61	Married Beekeepers	Eugene, Oregon	Eliminated 1st (in Salvador, Brazil)
Anthony Marotta	32	Dating	Los Angeles, California	Eliminated 2nd (in Fortaleza, Brazil)
Stephanie Kacandes	32	Dating	Los Angeles, California	Eliminated 2nd (in Fortaleza, Brazil)
Mark Yturralde	41	Best Friends	San Diego, California	Eliminated 3rd (in La Paz, Bolivia)
Bill Kahler	42	Best Friends	San Diego, California	Eliminated 3rd (in La Paz, Bolivia)
Marisa Axelrod	22	Southern Belles	Spartanburg, South Carolina	Eliminated 4th (in Tauranga, New Zealand)
Brooke Jackson	24	Southern Belles	Columbia, South Carolina	Eliminated 4th (in Tauranga, New Zealand)
Aja Benton	25	Dating Long Distance	Los Angeles, California	Eliminated 5th (in Siem Reap, Cambodia)
Ty White	25	Dating Long Distance	West Bloomfield, Michigan	Eliminated 5th (in Siem Reap, Cambodia)
Kelly Crabb	26	Divorcées	Houston, Texas	Eliminated 6th (in Delhi, India)
Christy Cook	26	Divorcées	Austin, Texas	Eliminated 6th (in Delhi, India)
Terence Gerchberg	35	Newly Dating	New York City, New York	Eliminated 7th (in Almaty, Kazakhstan)
Sarah Leshner	31	Newly Dating	New York City, New York	Eliminated 7th (in Almaty, Kazakhstan)
Toni Imbimbo	51	Mother & Son	Woodside, California	Eliminated 8th (in Moscow, Russia)
Dallas Imbimbo	22	Mother & Son	Woodside, California	Eliminated 8th (in Moscow, Russia)
Andrew Lappitt	22	Frat Boys	Tucson, Arizona	Third place
Dan Honig	23	Frat Boys	Wilmington, Delaware	Third place
Ken Greene	51	Separated	Tampa, Florida	Runners-up
Tina Greene	48	Separated	San Diego, California	Runners-up
Nick Spangler	22	Siblings	New York City, New York	Winners
Starr Spangler	21	Siblings	Fort Worth, Texas	Winners

Future appearances

Terence Gerchberg and Andrew Lappitt later attended the public start of season 25.

== Results ==
The following teams are listed with their placements in each leg. Placements are listed in finishing order.

- A red placement with a dagger (†) indicates that the team was eliminated.
- An underlined blue placement with a double-dagger (‡) indicates that the team was the last to arrive at a Pit Stop in a non-elimination leg, and had to perform a Speed Bump task in the following leg.
- A green ƒ indicates that the team won the Fast Forward.

Team placement (by leg)
Team	1	2	3	4	5	6	7	8	9	10	11
Nick & Starr	1st	6th	6th	5th	1st	1st	1st	1stƒ	3rd	1st	1st
Ken & Tina	2nd	1st	1st	1stƒ	3rd	6th‡	4th	3rd	2nd	3rd	2nd
Andrew & Dan	7th	8th	7th	6th	6th	5th	5th	4th	4th‡	2nd	3rd
Toni & Dallas	6th	5th	2nd	4th	2nd	3rd	2nd	2nd	1st	4th† (Note: Toni and Dallas were initially denied their clue at the Detour, because they had taken the metro instead of a taxi, as directed, and were required to go back to the end of the Roadblock and then return to the Detour via taxi. After all of the other teams had checked in at the Pit Stop, Phil came to the Rizhskaya Station to inform Toni and Dallas of their elimination.)	
Terence & Sarah	3rd	3rd	3rd	2nd	5th (Note: Terence and Sarah initially arrived 3rd, but were issued a 30-minute penalty for speeding. They departed the next leg 5th.)	4th	3rd	5th†			
Kelly & Christy	5th	7th	8th	3rd	4th	2nd	6th†				
Aja & Ty	8th	4th	5th	7th	7th†						
Marisa & Brooke	10th	9th	4th	8th†							
Mark & Bill	4th	2nd	9th† (Note: Mark and Bill initially arrived 8th, but were issued a 30-minute penalty for taking a taxi instead of going on foot to the Detour as the clue had instructed. Kelly and Christy checked in during this penalty time, dropping Mark and Bill to last.)								
Anthony & Stephanie	9th	10th†									
Anita & Arthur	11th†										

== Race summary ==
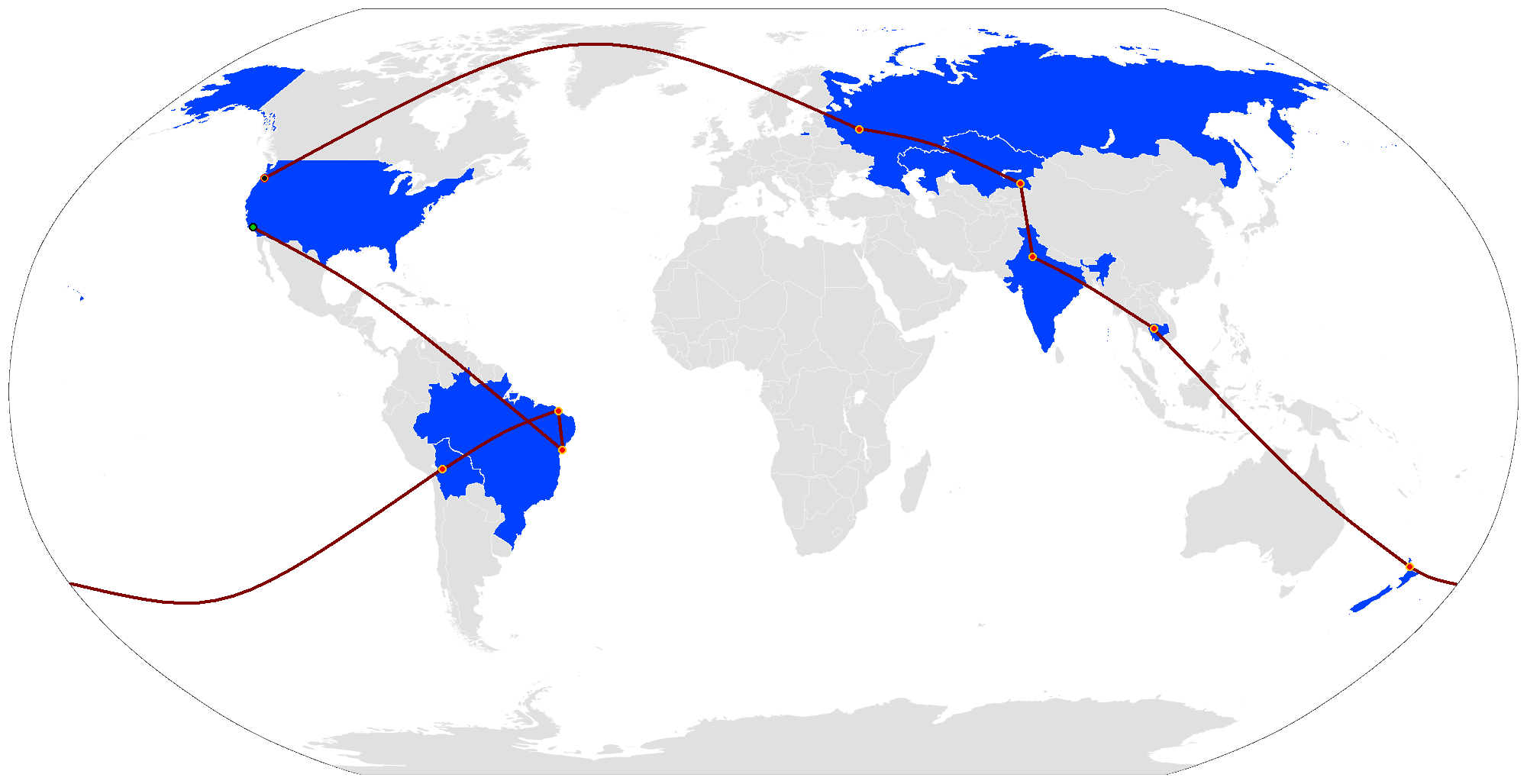
The route of The Amazing Race 13.

Destinations	Air travel Rail travel Water travel Bus travel Helicopter travel Bicycle travel Gondola travel
Route Markers	Detour Roadblock Fast Forward Speed Bump Pit Stop

=== Leg 1 (United States → Brazil) ===
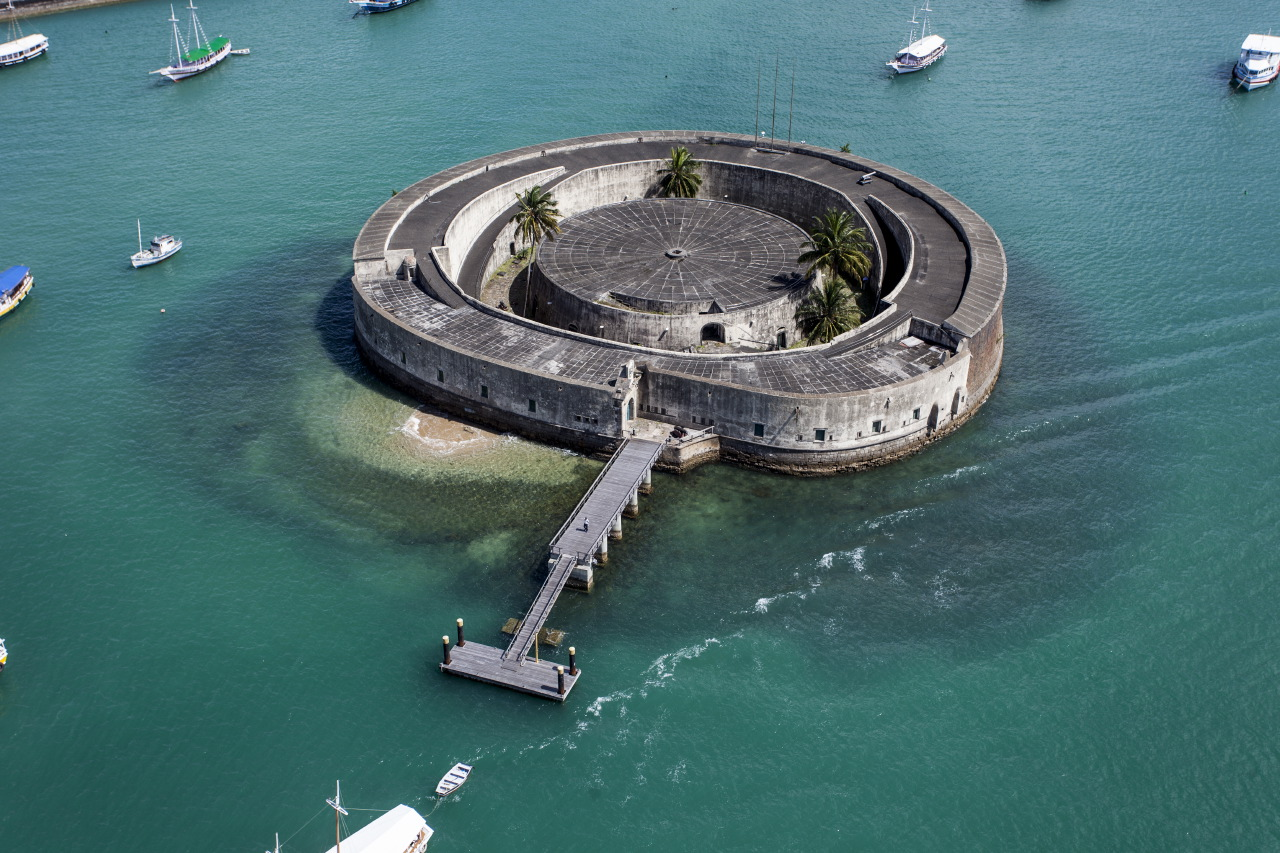
Teams checked in at the Pit Stop at the Forte de São Marcelo in Salvador, Brazil.

- Episode 1: "Bees Are Much Calmer Than All This!" (September 28, 2008)
- Prize: A trip for two to Belize (awarded to Nick and Starr)
- Eliminated: Anita and Arthur

Locations

- Los Angeles, California (Los Angeles Memorial Coliseum) (Starting Line)
- Los Angeles → Salvador, Brazil
- Salvador (O Rei do Pernil)
- Salvador (Praça da Sé)
- Salvador (19th Batalhão de Caçadores Military Base)
- Salvador (Igreja da Ordem Terceira de São Francisco)
- Salvador (Escadaria do Passo or Elevador Lacerda)
- Salvador (Forte de São Marcelo)

Episode summary

- Teams set off from the Los Angeles Memorial Coliseum and drove to Los Angeles International Airport, where they had to book one of two flights to Salvador, Brazil. The first six teams departed on the first flight via American Airlines, while the remaining five teams departed three hours later on the second flight via United Airlines. However, the first flight was delayed an hour and a half during its connection in Rio de Janeiro. Once there, teams had to go to a sandwich shop, choose a traditional vending cart, take it to the Praça da Sé, and deliver it to a man named Indio in order to receive their next clue.
- Teams had to travel to the 19th Batalhão de Caçadores Military Base, where they had to sign up for one of three departure times the next morning, and then spent the night under a mosquito net. The next morning, teams had to travel to the Igreja da Ordem Terceira de São Francisco to find their next clue.
- This season's first Detour was a choice between Hard Way Up or Soft Way Down. In Hard Way Up, teams climbed the Escadaria do Passo on their hands and knees. At the top, teams were asked how many stairs they'd climbed. If they gave the correct answer, they received their next clue; if they were wrong, they had to go down the staircase and try again. In Soft Way Down, teams had to go to the top of the Elevador Lacerda, an outdoor elevator, and climb down a 240-foot (73 m) cargo net to receive their next clue.
- After the Detour, teams had to travel by ferry to the Pit Stop: the Forte de São Marcelo.

=== Leg 2 (Brazil) ===
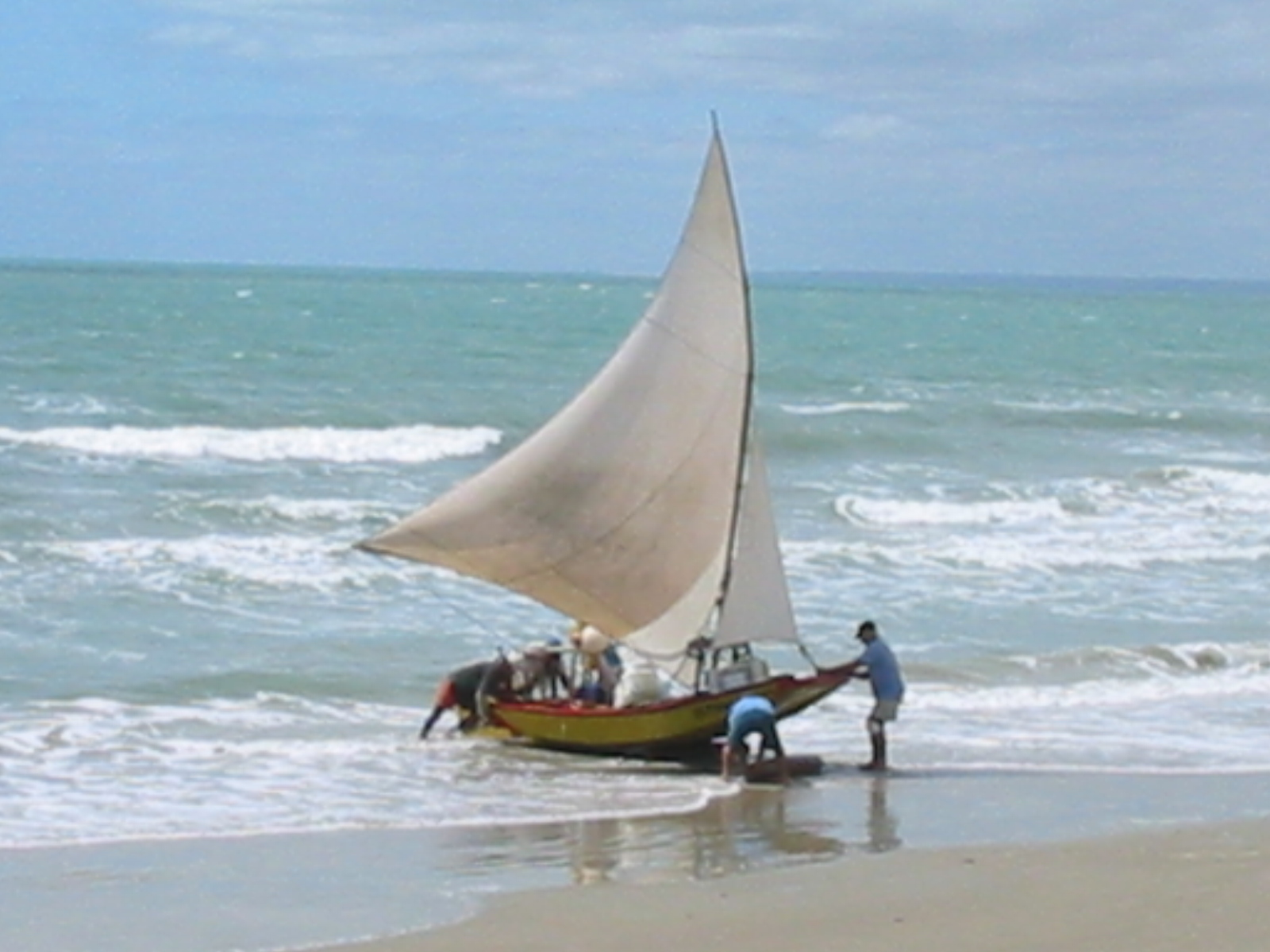
For part of the Detour, teams traveled to Pecém Beach and moved a traditional Brazilian sailboat known as a jangada.

- Episode 2: "Do You Like American Candy?" (October 5, 2008)
- Prize: An off-road vehicle for each team member (awarded to Ken and Tina)
- Eliminated: Anthony and Stephanie

Locations

- Salvador (Port of Salvador)
- Salvador → Fortaleza
- Caucaia (Cumbuco – Praia de Cumbuco)
- Caucaia (Cauípe – Barraca do Manoel)
- São Gonçalo do Amarante (Pecém Beach or Port of Pecem)
- Caucaia (Parque de Vaquejada)
- Fortaleza (Cidade da Criança)

Episode summary

- At the start of the leg, teams were instructed to fly to Fortaleza. Once there, teams had to travel to Praia de Cumbuco, where they had to ride a dune buggy along the beach to Barraca do Manoel to receive their next clue.
- This leg's Detour was a choice between Beach It or Docket. In Beach It, teams had to travel to Pecém Beach and move a traditional Brazilian sailboat known as a jangada to an inlet to receive their next clue. In Docket, teams had to travel to the nearby Port of Pecem and search a computer database for the specific ID number of the shipping container that held their next clue.
- After the Detour, teams had to travel to the Parque de Vaquejada to find their next clue.
- In this season's first Roadblock, one team member had to locate the name of their next Pit Stop – Cidade da Criança – hidden among several advertisements painted along a 600-foot (180 m) wall to receive their next clue.

=== Leg 3 (Brazil → Bolivia) ===
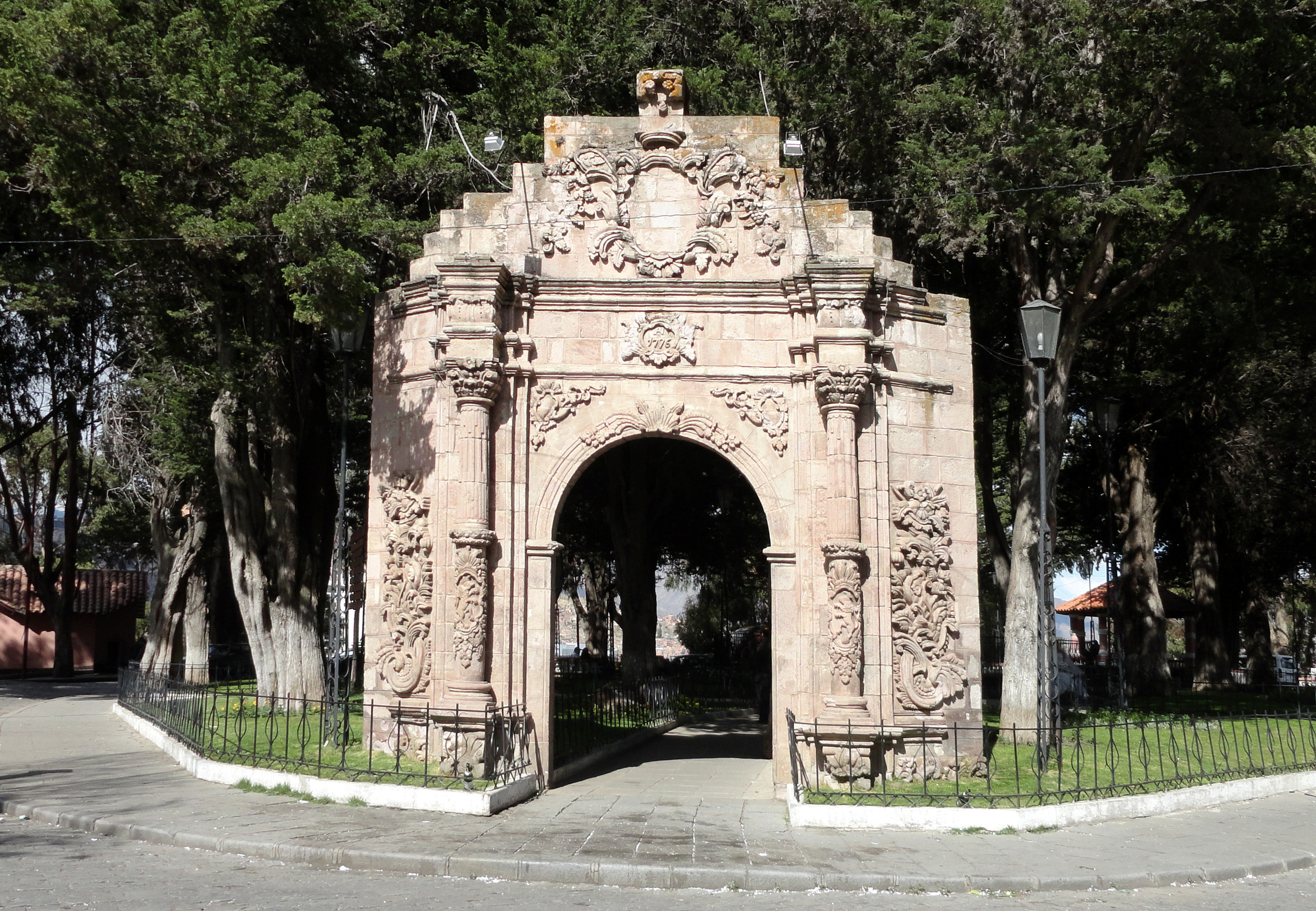
Teams finished the leg in Bolivia at the Mirador el Monticulo, which overlooks the city of La Paz.

- Episode 3: "Did You Push My Sports Bra Off the Ledge?" (October 12, 2008)
- Prize: A trip for two to Cabo San Lucas, Mexico (awarded to Ken and Tina)
- Eliminated: Mark and Bill

Locations

- Fortaleza (Praia de Iracema – Estátua de Iracema e Martim)
- Fortaleza → La Paz, Bolivia
- La Paz (Plaza Venezuela – Simón Bolívar Statue)
- La Paz (Plaza Murillo – Narvaez Hat and Shoe Store)
- La Paz (Plaza del Estudiante, Plaza Bolivia & Plaza Isabel La Católica or Mercado de las Brujas)
- La Paz (Plaza Abaroa)
- El Alto (El Multifuncional)
- La Paz (Sopocachi – Mirador el Monticulo)

Episode summary

- At the start of the leg, teams were instructed to fly to La Paz, Bolivia. Once there, teams had to go to the statue of Simón Bolívar, where they spent the night. The next morning, teams had to search the classified ads of a newspaper for their next clue, which directed teams to the Narvaez Hat Shop in Plaza Murillo. There, teams had to buy a traditional bowler hat called a bombin to receive their next clue. Teams were instricted to keep their hats for the remainder of the leg,
- This leg's Detour was a choice between Musical March or Bumpy Ride. In Musical March, teams had to travel on foot to three plazas several blocks apart and gather the members of a marching band. After leading the band to Plaza Abaroa, teams received their next clue. In Bumpy Ride, teams had to travel on foot to Mercado de las Brujas, where they had to ride a traditional wooden bicycle down the steep cobblestone streets to Plaza Abaroa to receive their next clue.
- After the Detour, teams had to travel to El Multifuncional in El Alto to find their next clue.
- In this leg's Roadblock, one team member had to learn six wrestling moves from luchadoras called the Fighting Cholitas and successfully perform the moves in the ring to receive their next clue, which directed them to the Pit Stop: Mirador el Monticulo.

=== Leg 4 (Bolivia → New Zealand) ===
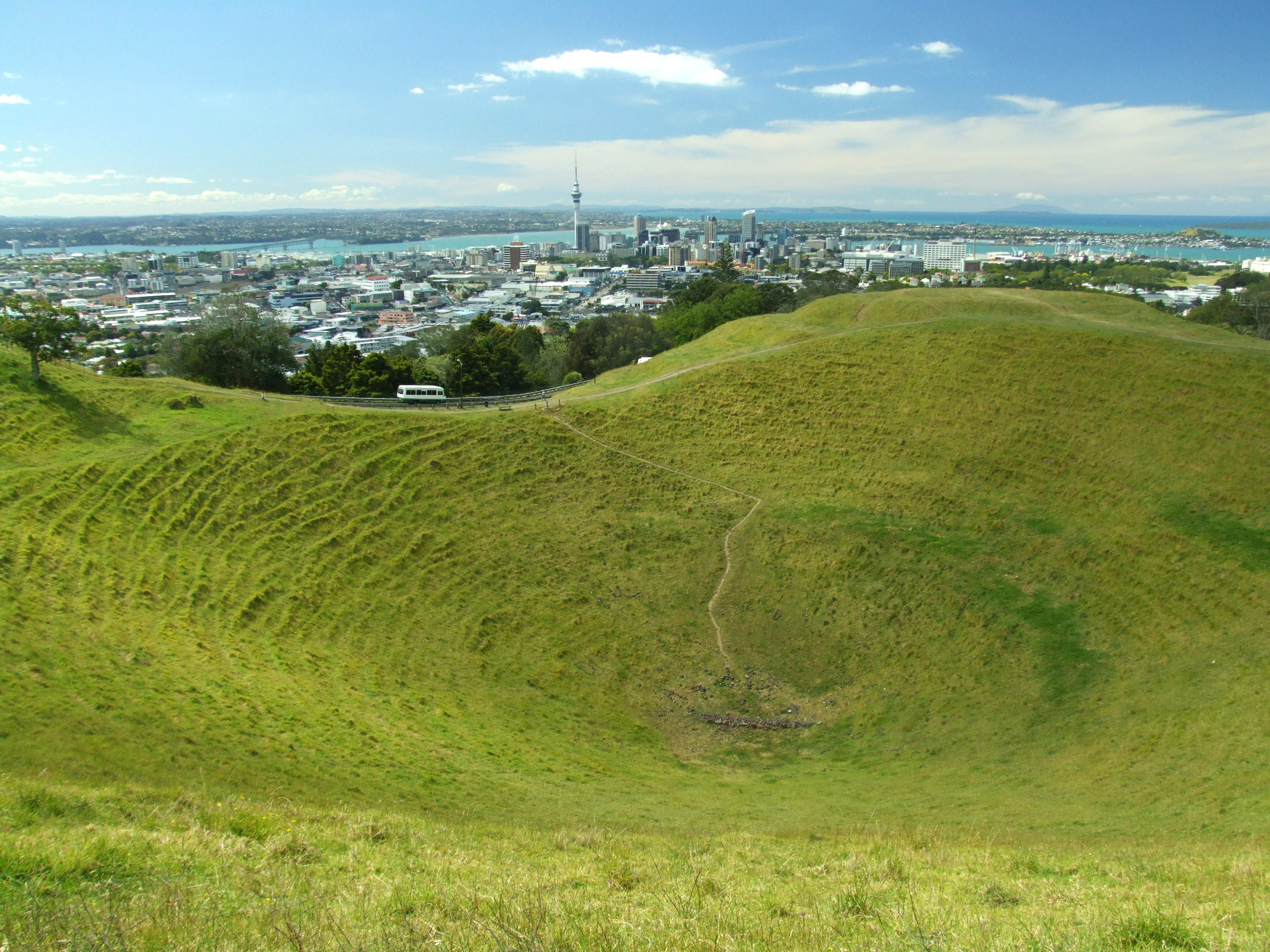
In Auckland, racers participated in a Roadblock at Mount Eden by searching among dancing Māori warriors for one with a specific tā moko facial tattoo.

- Episode 4: "I Wonder If They Like Blondes in New Zealand?" (October 19, 2008)
- Prize: A trip for two to Rio de Janeiro, Brazil (awarded to Ken and Tina)
- Eliminated: Marisa and Brooke

Locations

- La Paz (Sopocachi – Mirador el Monticulo)
- La Paz → Auckland, New Zealand
- Whangaparaoa (Gulf Harbour)
- Auckland (Sky Tower)
- Auckland (Mount Eden)
- Auckland (CityLife Hotel)
- Te Puke (Kiwi 360)
- Te Puke (Kiwi Orchard) or Tauranga (Blokart Heaven)
- Tauranga (Summerhill Recreational Farm)

Episode summary

- At the start of the leg, teams were instructed to fly to Auckland, New Zealand. Once there, teams had to drive to Gulf Harbour and untie a large Gordian knot to retrieve a clue from inside.
- This season's first Fast Forward required one team to climb the mast of the Sky Tower in Auckland to retrieve a Travelocity Roaming Gnome from the top. Ken and Tina won the Fast Forward and received a helicopter ride to the Pit Stop.
- Teams who did not attempt the Fast Forward had to drive to the top of Mount Eden to find their next clue.
- In this leg's Roadblock, one team member had to search among Māori warriors who were performing a haka dance for the one whose tā moko face tattoo matched a selected pattern to receive their next clue. If racers chose the wrong warrior, the warrior took the image away and they had to start over with a new pattern.
- After the Roadblock, teams had to drive to the CityLife Hotel and find their next clue on the roof, which instructed them to use binoculars to spot one of eight Travelocity Roaming Gnomes hidden around downtown Auckland. They then had to retrieve one gnome and find their next clue on the bottom of its base, which directed teams to Kiwi 360 in Te Puke. Teams had to keep the gnome with them for the rest of the leg.
- This leg's Detour was a choice between Matter of Time or Matter of Skill. In Matter of Time, teams had to drive to a kiwi orchard. There, teams had to use their feet to crush a vat of kiwis and produce 12 US quarts (11,000 ml) of juice. Both team members then had to drink a glass of juice to receive their next clue. In Matter of Skill, teams had to drive to Blokart Heaven. There, teams had to assemble two Blokarts, and each team member had to complete three laps around a track to receive their next clue.
- After the Detour, teams had to check in at the Pit Stop: Summerhill Recreational Farm in Tauranga.

Additional note

- John Keoghan, father of host Phil Keoghan, appeared as the Pit Stop greeter in this leg.

=== Leg 5 (New Zealand → Cambodia) ===
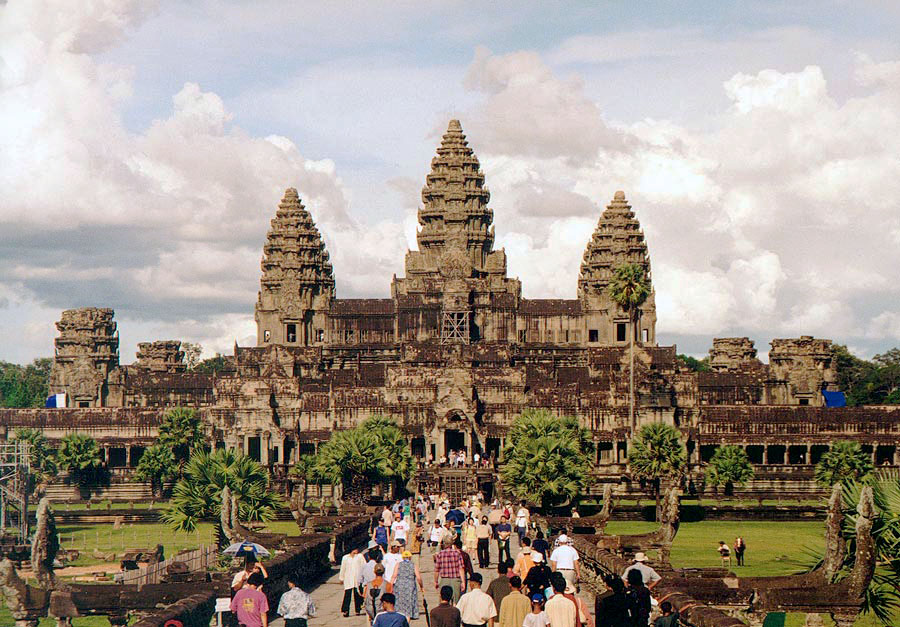
At the Angkor Wat temple in Siem Reap, racers searched for a chamber inside which produced a specific echo.

- Episode 5: "Do It Like a Madman" (October 26, 2008)
- Prize: A trip for two to Saint John (awarded to Nick and Starr)
- Eliminated: Aja and Ty

Locations

- Tauranga (Summerhill Recreational Farm)
- Auckland → Siem Reap, Cambodia
- Siem Reap (Phlau Ben Lane – Gas Station)
- Siem Reap (Siem Reap Harbor) → Tonlé Sap (Kho Andeth)
- Siem Reap (Angkor Wat)
- Siem Reap (Bayon Temple)

Episode summary

- At the start of the leg, teams were instructed to fly to Siem Reap, Cambodia. Once there, teams traveled to Phlau Ben Lane and found a roadside gas station, where they had to fill a truck with 25 liters (6.6 U.S. gal) of diesel fuel. They then drove the truck to Siem Reap Harbor, where they had to ride a boat to the floating Kho Andeth restaurant to retrieve their next clue.
- This leg's Detour was a choice between Village Life or Village Work. In Village Life, teams had to retrieve a set of toy teeth from a dentist, a doll from a tailor, and a basketball from a floating basketball court. Each team member had to score a basket before returning all the items they had collected to the Siem Reap Harbor, where they received their next clue. In Village Work, teams had to go to Tonlé Sap, retrieve two full baskets of fish from the water, and then return them to Siem Reap Harbor in order to receive their next clue.
- After the Detour, teams had to travel to Angkor Wat to find their next clue.
- In this leg's Roadblock, one team member had to search Angkor Wat for an echo chamber within a room called "Prassat Kok Troung". Once there, they had to stand in a specific spot and thump their chest so as to make an echo sound in the room. They could then pick up a stone frieze, which displayed their next clue on the reverse directing them to the Pit Stop: the Bayon Temple.

=== Leg 6 (Cambodia → India) ===
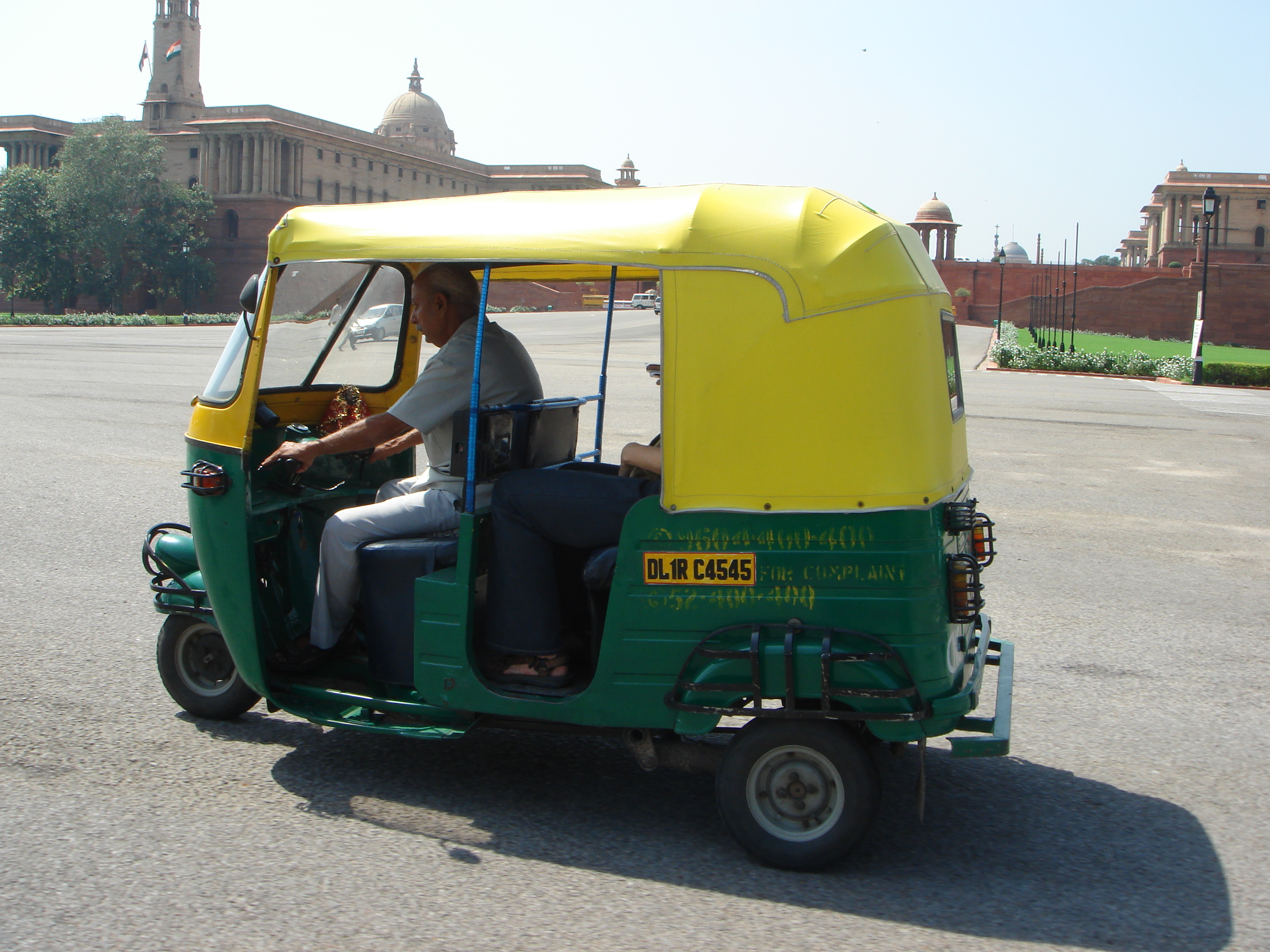
For the Roadblock in Delhi, one team member had to paint an auto rickshaw green.

- Episode 6: "Please Hold While I Singe My Skull" (November 2, 2008)
- Prize: An electric car for each team member (awarded to Nick and Starr)

Locations

- Siem Reap (Bayon Temple)
- Siem Reap → Delhi, India
- Delhi (Moonlight Motors)
- Delhi (Ambassador Hotel)
- Delhi (Prakash Banquet Hall or Dhobi Ghat)
- Delhi (Baháʼí House)

Episode summary

- At the start of this leg, teams were instructed to fly to Delhi, India. Once there, teams had to travel to Moonlight Motors in order to find their next clue.
- In this leg's Roadblock, one team member had cover all of the glass and wheels of an auto rickshaw with newspaper and then spray-paint the black portions with green paint, indicating that the rickshaw had switched to using natural gas as fuel, in order to receive their next clue.
- After the Roadblock, teams had to travel to the Ambassador Hotel and search the garden for a doorman, who had their next clue.
- This leg's Detour was a choice between Launder Money or Launder Clothes. In Launder Money, teams had to make a traditional Indian wedding necklace by stapling enough 10 Indian rupee banknotes to the necklace so that they added up to ₹780. They then had to find the newlywed couple in the crowded banquet hall and present them with the necklace in order to receive their next clue. In Launder Clothes, teams had to use a traditional charcoal iron to press twenty pieces of clothing in order to receive their next clue.
- After the Detour, teams had to check in at the Pit Stop: the Baháʼí House.

Additional note

- This was a non-elimination leg.

=== Leg 7 (India) ===
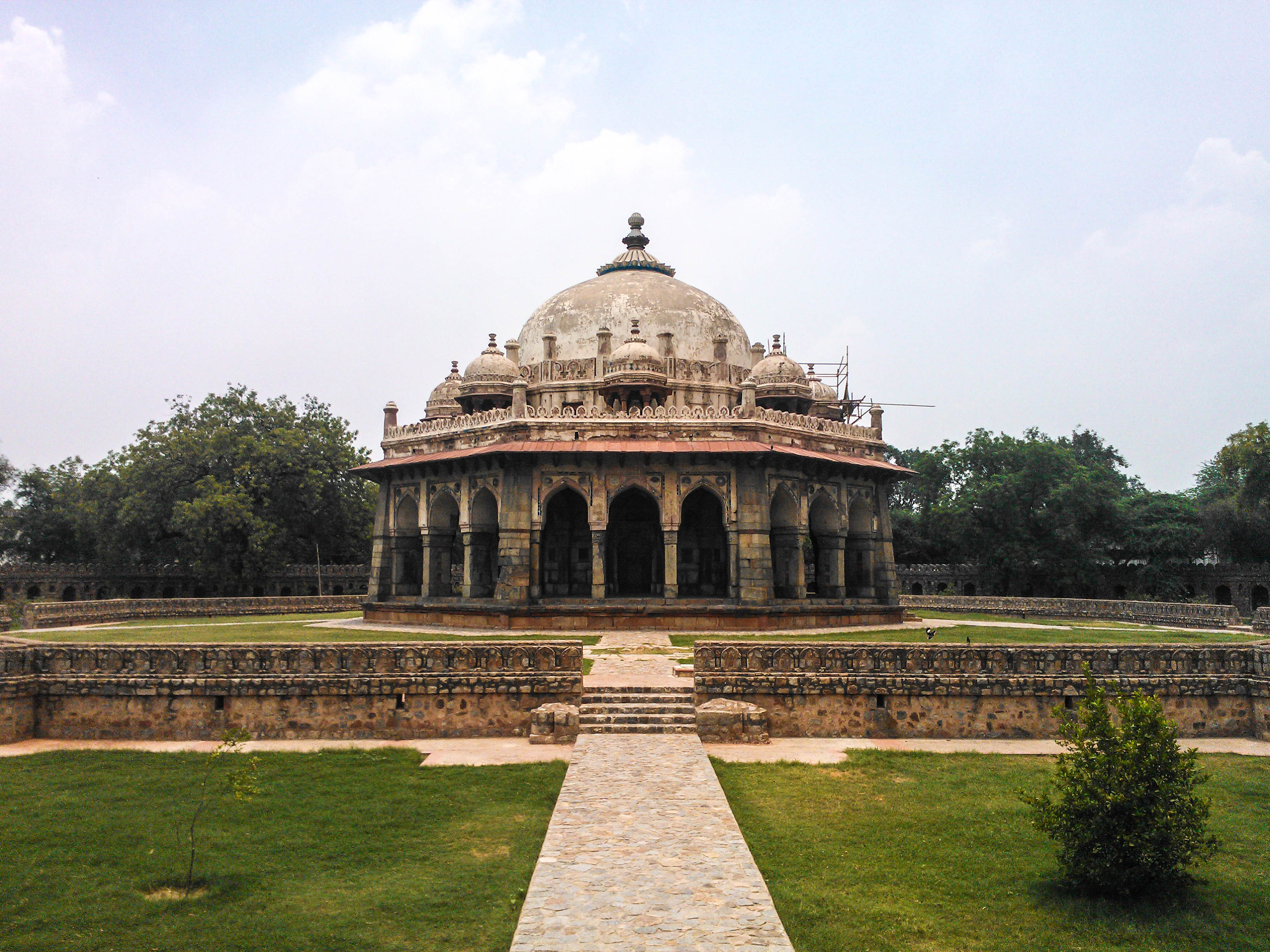
Teams ended the second leg in Delhi around the tomb of Isa Khan at the historic Humayun's Tomb, which served as the Pit Stop for this leg.

- Episode 7: "My Nose Is on Fire" (November 9, 2008)
- Prize: A trip for two to Kauaʻi, Hawaii (awarded to Nick and Starr)
- Eliminated: Kelly and Christy

Locations

- Delhi (Baháʼí House)
- Delhi (Kalkaji – Deshbandhu Apartments)
- Delhi (Jain Mandir – Charity Birds Hospital)
- Delhi (Chandni Chowk – Gurudwara Sis Ganj Sahib)
- Delhi (Nai Sarak Street or Ram Bhandar & Shwan Kumar and Sons)
- Delhi (Humayun's Tomb – Isa Khan's Tomb)

Episode summary

- At the start of this leg, teams had to travel to the Deshbandhu Apartments in Kalkaji in order to find their next clue.
- In this leg's Roadblock, one team member had to climb one of three ladders to find a suspended envelope imprinted with The Amazing Race, among several others that said Try Again, amid celebrators of Holi, the Festival of Colours, who were bombarding them with colored dyes and water.
- After the Roadblock, teams had to travel to the Charity Birds Hospital at Jain Mandir, where they had to search the birdcages for their next clue.
- For their Speed Bump, Ken & Tina had to serve holy water to hundreds of Sikhs at the Gurudwara Sis Ganj Sahib before they could continue racing.
- This leg's Detour was a choice between Bleary Eyed or Teary Eyed. In Bleary Eyed, teams had to follow a series of power lines on Nai Sarak Street, keeping track of the numbered tags. They then had to report these numbers to a power company official and if they were correct, they could plug in a musical Ganesh statue in order to receive their next clue. In Teary Eyed, teams had to search a spice market for Ram Bhandar, where teams were given two 40-pound (18 kg) bags of chili peppers that they had to transport one-quarter mile (0.40 km) to Shwan Kumar and Sons and then grind into chili powder in order to receive their next clue.
- After the Detour, teams had to check in at the Pit Stop: the Tomb of Isa Khan.

=== Leg 8 (India → Kazakhstan) ===
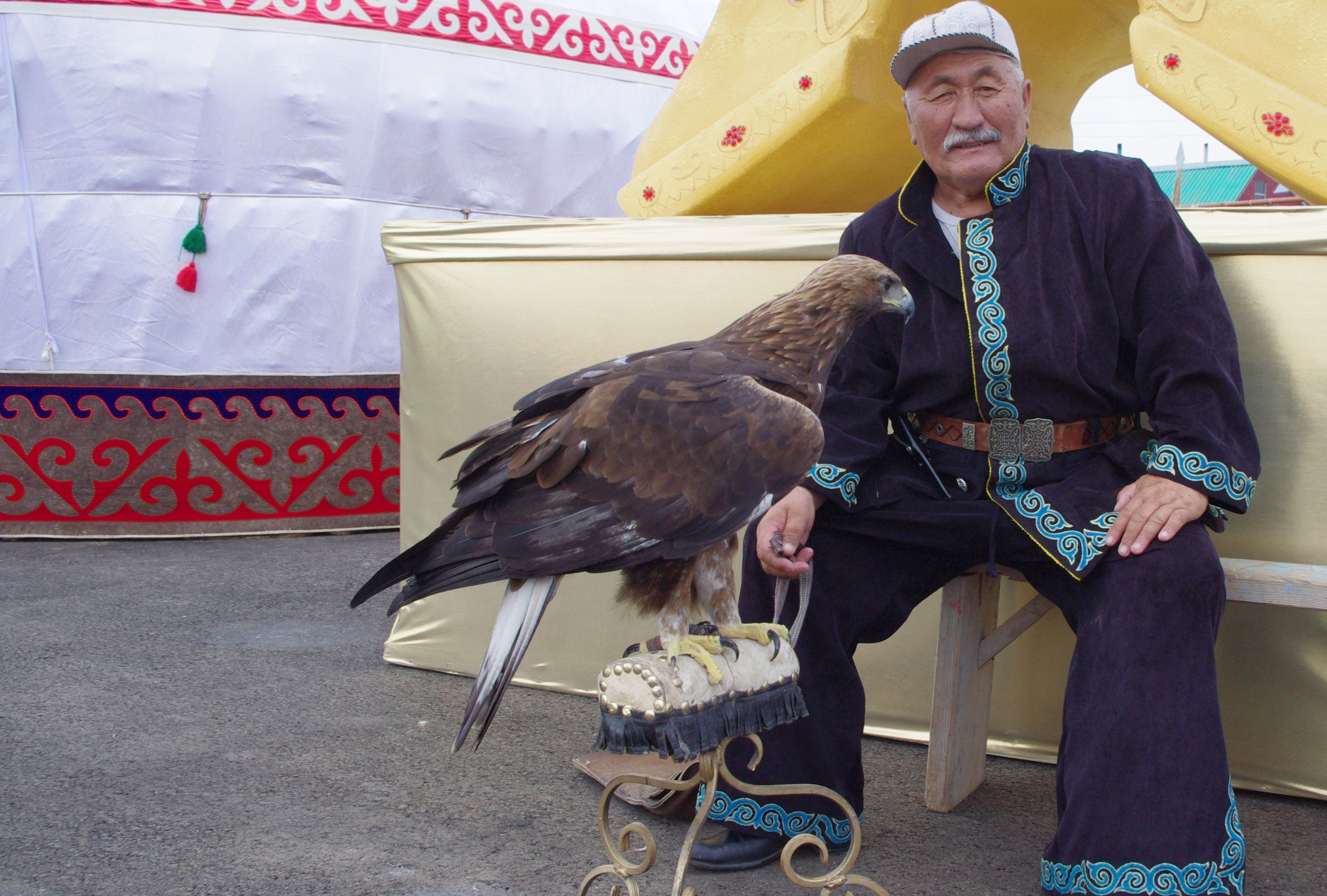
At the Kok Tobe Arch, teams received their next clue from a trained golden eagle.

- Episode 8: "I'm Like an Angry Cow" (November 16, 2008)
- Prize: A WaveRunner for each team member (awarded to Nick and Starr)
- Eliminated: Terence and Sarah

Locations

- Delhi (Humayun's Tomb – Isa Khan's Tomb)
- Delhi → Almaty, Kazakhstan
- Boralday (Alel Agro Chicken Factory)
- Almaty (Alasha Restaurant)
- Almaty (Kok Tobe Arch)
- Almaty (Almaty State Puppet Theater & Zelyoniy Bazaar)
- Almaty (Old Square)

Episode summary

- At the start of this leg, teams were instructed to fly to Almaty, Kazakhstan. Once there, teams had to travel to the Alel Agro Chicken Factory in Boralday in order to find their next clue.
- In this leg's Roadblock, one team member had to search among 30,000 chickens for one of seven golden eggs, which they could trade for their next clue.
- In this season's second Fast Forward, teams had to join a traditional Kazakh feast at the Alasha Restaurant, where each team member had to eat a serving of sheep fat known as kurdyuk. Nick & Starr won the Fast Forward.
- After the Roadblock, teams had to search for a giant crane truck and travel to Kok Tobe Arch. There, at the foothills of the Tien Shan Mountains, teams followed a marked path to a Mongol warrior, who used a trained golden eagle to deliver them their next clue.
- This leg's Detour was a choice between Play Like Mad or Act Like Fools. In Play Like Mad, teams would have traveled to the Kazakh Museum of Folk Musical Instruments, where they would have learned to play a traditional folk tune on the dombra and the shang-kobuz. They then would have had to go to a nearby park and perform for locals so as to earn enough tips in order to receive their next clue. In Act Like Fools, teams traveled to the Almaty State Puppet Theater, where they had to put on a two-person cow costume and travel across town to a milk stand to drink a glass of milk. At the bottom of the glass was the name of their next destination – the Zelyoniy Bazaar – where they had to find the meat section in order to receive their next clue. All teams (except for Nick & Starr, who won the Fast Forward) chose Act Like Fools.
- After the Detour, teams had to travel on foot to the Pit Stop at the Old Square, bringing the cow costume with them.

=== Leg 9 (Kazakhstan → Russia) ===
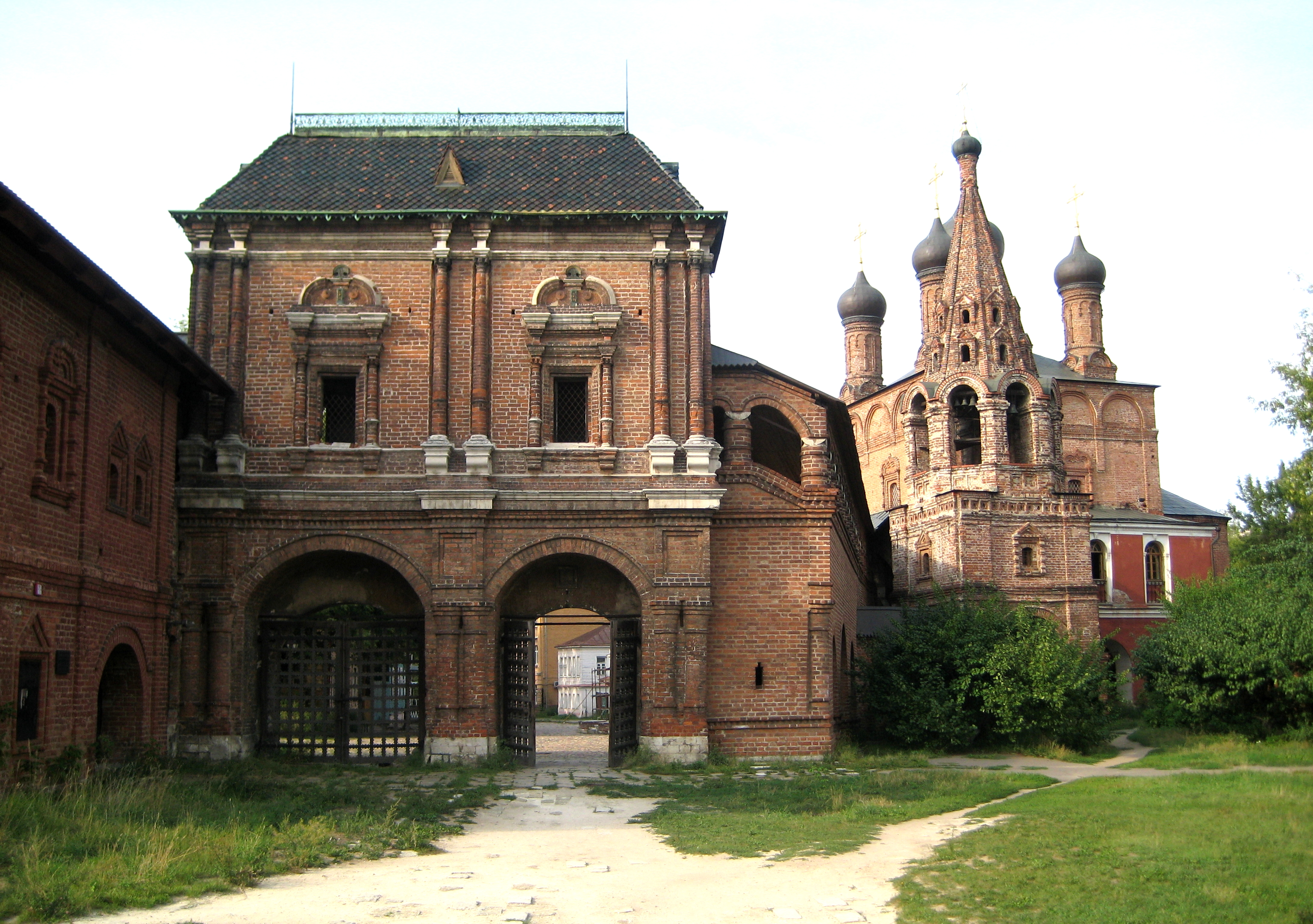
After arriving in Moscow, teams visited the Dormition Cathedral in Krutitsy, where they paid their respects in an Eastern Orthodox candle-lighting ceremony.

- Episode 9: "That Is Studly" (November 23, 2008)
- Prize: A trip for two to Punta Cana, Dominican Republic (awarded to Toni and Dallas)

Locations

- Almaty (Old Square)
- Almaty → Moscow, Russia
- Moscow (Krutitsy – Dormition Cathedral)
- Tatarintsevo (Kolosok Camp)
- Zhukovsky (Zhukovsky Bakery)
- Moscow (Neskuchny Sad Park)

Episode summary

- At the start of this leg, teams were instructed to fly to Moscow, Russia. Once there, teams had to travel to the Dormition Cathedral in Krutitsy, where they took part in an Eastern Orthodox candle-lighting ceremony. All women were required to don headscarves prior to entering the monastery per religious custom. Teams then received their next clue directing them to the Kolosok Camp in Tatarintsevo.
- This leg's Detour was a choice between Boots or Borscht. For both Detour options, teams had to dress in a Russian military uniform. In Boots, teams had to learn a Russian parade march and then perform one full lap with a drill team to the drill master's standard in order to receive their next clue. In Borscht, teams had to travel to a nearby tent and serve 75 soldiers a bowl of borscht in order to receive their next clue.
- After the Detour, teams had to travel to the Zhukovsky Bakery in order to receive their next clue.
- In this leg's Roadblock, one team member had to unload fifty 55-pound (25 kg) bags of flour from a truck and properly deliver them to the bakery in order to receive their next clue directing them to the Pit Stop: Neskuchny Sad Park.

Additional note

- This was a non-elimination leg.

=== Leg 10 (Russia) ===
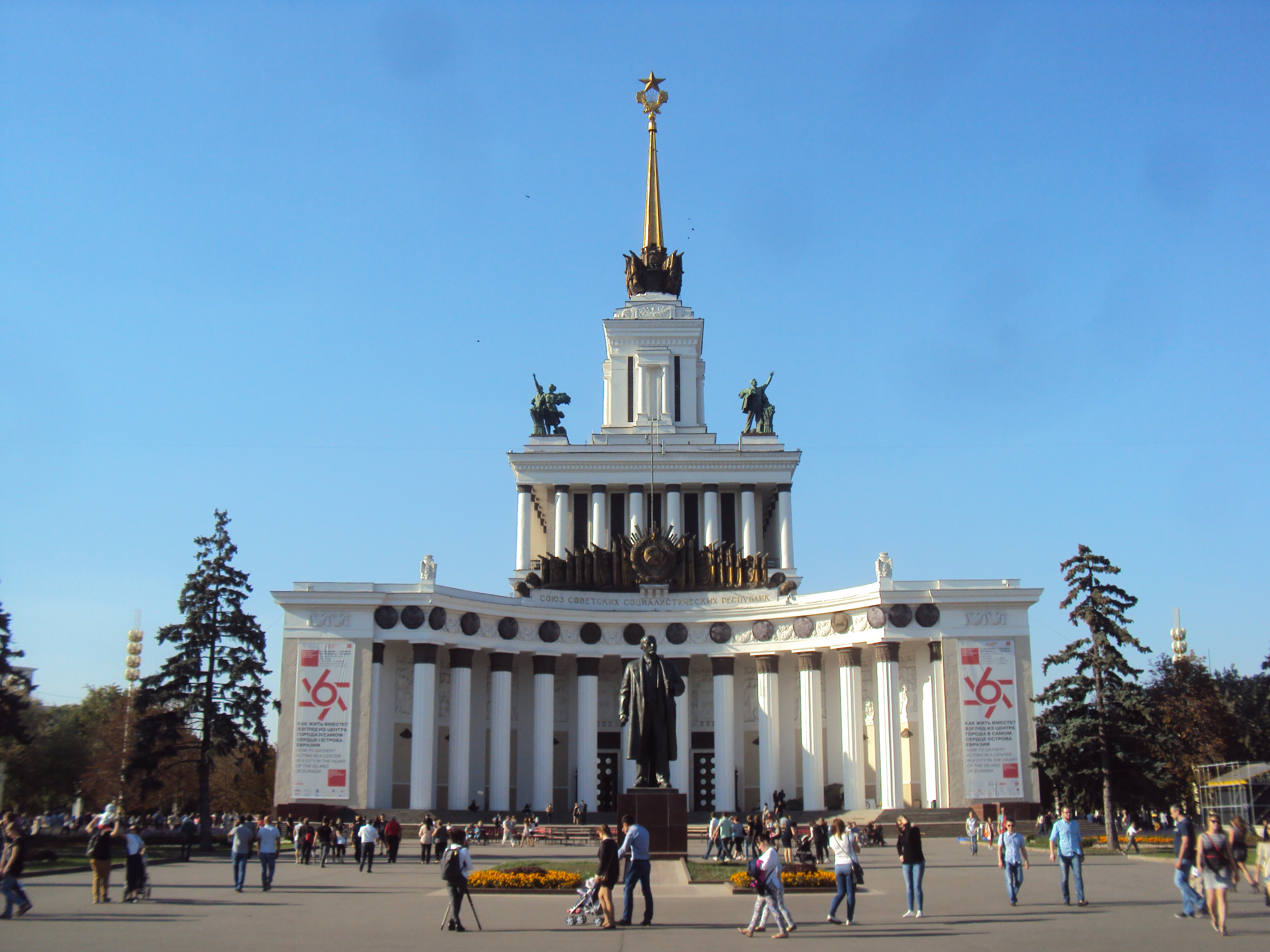
Teams finished the second leg in Moscow in front of VDNKh Park's Central Pavilion, which overlooks Propylaea: the central gate entrance.

- Episode 10: "You're Gonna Get Me Killed" (November 30, 2008)
- Prize: A trip for two to Anguilla (awarded to Nick and Starr)
- Eliminated: Toni and Dallas

Locations

- Moscow (Neskuchny Sad Park)
- Moscow (Severnoye Tushino Park – Submarine Komsomolets of Novosibirsk)
- Moscow (Fallen Monument Park, Bukinist Book Store & Bulgakov House)
- Moscow (Sokolniki Park)
- Moscow ( or Multiple locations (see below) → VDNKh Metro Station)
- Moscow (VDNKh Park)

Episode summary

- At the start of this leg, teams traveled to Severnoye Tushino Park, where they had to search the Komsomolets of Novosibirsk submarine and find the Sonar room. Among the crew members, teams had to find an actor who had appeared in the film The Hunt for Red October, who gave them their next clue directing them to the Fallen Monument Park.
- In this season's final Roadblock, one team member had to count the number of statues of Vladimir Lenin and Joseph Stalin in the park, and then proceed to an antique bookshop on Arbat Street, where they had to give the numbers to the manager. If they were incorrect, they had to wait 10 minutes before they could make another guess. If they were correct, they received a copy of The Master and Margarita by Mikhail Bulgakov, and found a clue about their next destination – Bulgakov's old flat – on the page of the correct answer. They reunited with their teammate at the Bulgakov House, where they received their next clue.
- After traveling to Sokolniki Park, teams had to search for a woman with a Shetland pony in order to receive their next clue.
- For their Speed Bump, Andrew & Dan had to perform a traditional Russian dance to the satisfaction of a choreographer before they could continue racing.
- This leg's Detour was a choice between Ride the Rails or Ride the Lines. In Ride the Rails, teams had to take the Moscow Metro from Sokolniki to Ulitsa 1905 Goda, where they picked up a samsa from a snack stand. The wrapper directed teams to Kitay-Gorod, where they had to give the samosa to a babushka near the statue of Saints Cyril and Methodius in Slavyanskaya Square. In return, she gave them a postcard directing teams to the VDNKh Park station, where they found their next clue. In Ride the Lines, teams had to travel by trolleybus from Sokolniki Station to Krasnoselskaya Station and find a key maker, who gave them a key. The key tag directed teams to the Rizhskaya Station, where they found a postcard with their next clue inside a locker.
- After the Detour, teams had to travel by foot to the Pit Stop: the Central Pavilion of VDNKh Park.

Additional note

- Toni and Dallas were initially denied their clue at the Detour, because they had taken the metro instead of a taxi, as had been required in the clue, and were required to go back to the end of the Roadblock and return to the Detour by taxi. After all of the other teams had checked in at the Pit Stop, Phil came out to Rizhskaya Station to inform Toni and Dallas of their elimination.

=== Leg 11 (Russia → United States) ===
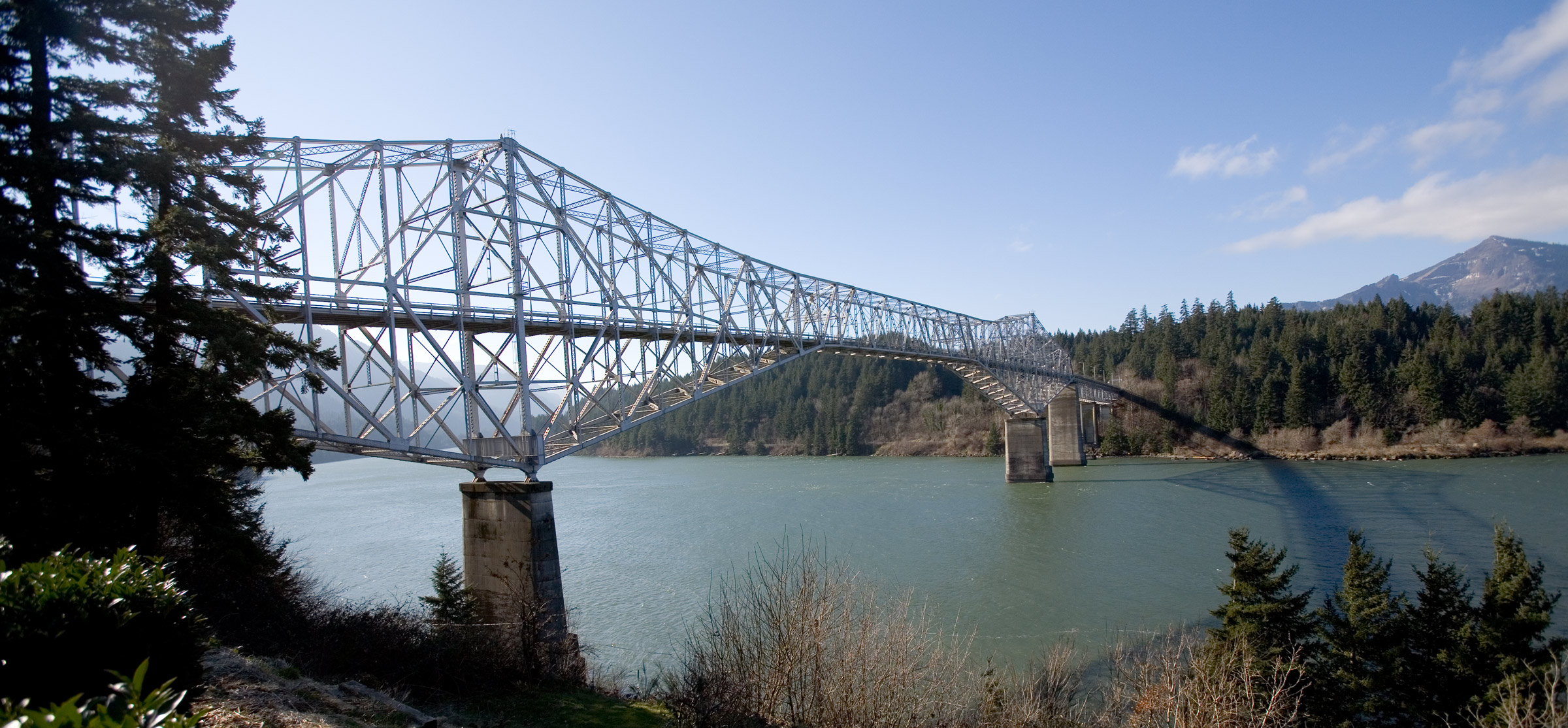
The final leg in Oregon included a final memory task which took place around Cascade Locks and Canal, including the Bridge of the Gods.

- Episode 11: "You Look Like Peter Pan" (December 7, 2008)
- Prize: US$1,000,000
- Winners: Nick and Starr
- Runners-up: Ken and Tina
- Third place: Andrew and Dan

Locations

- Moscow (Maly Krasnokholmsky Bridge)
- Moscow → Portland, Oregon
- Newberg (Tilikum Retreat Center)
- Cascade Locks (Bridge of the Gods)
- Cascade Locks (Cascade Locks Marine Park – Thunder Island)
- Portland (Portland Building)
- Portland (Standard Building)
- Portland (Alder Street Food Cart Pods)
- Portland (Voodoo Doughnut)
- Portland (Pittock Mansion)

Episode summary

- At the start of this leg, teams were instructed to fly to Portland, Oregon. Once there, teams had to find their next clue at the Tilikum Retreat Center in Newberg.
- This season's final Detour was a choice between High & Dry or Low & Wet. In High & Dry, each team member had to climb 30 feet (9.1 m) up a tree, where they had to balance themselves on a log and then jump off to each grab half of their next clue. In Low & Wet, teams would have had to walk 850 feet (260 m) across floating logs to a river island with their next clue. All teams chose High & Dry.
- After the Detour, teams had to travel to the Bridge of the Gods in Cascade Locks, Oregon, where they had to ride a zip-line from the bridge along the Columbia River to nearby Thunder Island. There, teams undertook a memory challenge. Given an answer board with spaces numbered for the first ten legs, they removed covers one at a time, revealing the symbol of either a Roadblock, Detour, Route Info, or Pit Stop. Teams then had to search through 150 identical clue boxes to find a picture depicting the task or location from that leg. When they retrieved a picture and placed it on the board in the corresponding position, a green light would indicate whether it was correct and if so, they could move on to the next one; otherwise they had to try again. Once all ten spaces were correct, teams could retrieve their next clue directing them to the Portland Building. The correct answers were:

Correct answers
Leg	Symbol	Location	Country
1	Route Info	O Rei do Pernil	Brazil
2	Detour	Barraca do Manoel	Brazil
3	Roadblock	Los Titanes del Ring	Bolivia
4	Pit Stop	Summerhill Recreational Farm	New Zealand
5	Roadblock	Angkor Wat	Cambodia
6	Route Info	Ambassador Hotel	India
7	Detour	Nai Sarak	India
8	Pit Stop	Old Square	Kazakhstan
9	Route Info	Krutitsy	Russia
10	Roadblock	Fallen Monument Park	Russia

- At the Portland Building, teams had to search for a green dinosaur statue located in the adjacent Standard Building in order to find their next clue. Teams were then directed to the Alder Street Food Cart Pods, where they had to search for the food cart selling ethnic food from the country of the last Pit Stop (Russia), where the proprietor handed them their next clue. Teams were then instructed to travel to the place where "the magic is in the hole", and they had to figure out that it was a reference to Voodoo Doughnut. There, teams found their final clue directing them to the finish line: the Pittock Mansion.

== Reception ==
=== Critical response ===
The Amazing Race 13 received mixed-to-positive reviews. Diana Steenbergen of IGN called this another successful season writing that "for the most part, the race was designed well, and the tasks were often very funny" and "this season was cast with an adequate bunch of contestants". Arthur Perkins of Reality Wanted praised this season's cast and wrote that "AR13 will rank high on my list of topnotch Amazing Races." Heather Havrilesky of Salon wrote that even after 13 seasons the show "remain entertaining regardless of the personalities involved." Josh Wolk of Entertainment Weekly wrote that he felt indifferent by the end of the season. Michael Hewitt of the Orange County Register called this "a sometimes maddening season." Reece Forward of Screen Rant ranked this season as the show's best praising the cast, humor, and story arcs writing that "It's a season that gets lost in the shuffle a lot of the time due to following one of the most popular seasons among fans, and preceding a season that marked a clear change in the show" but "when it gets the attention it deserves, it's clear that season 13 stands well on its own as one of the funniest, most endearing seasons of The Amazing Race with a unique cast, gorgeous locations, and consistent positive quality episode to episode." In 2016, this season was ranked 16th out of the first 27 seasons by the Rob Has a Podcast Amazing Race correspondents. In 2021, Val Barone of TheThings ranked this season as the show's 6th best season. In 2024, Rhenn Taguiam of Game Rant placed this season within the bottom 13 out of 36.

== Works cited ==
- Castro, Adam-Troy (2006). My Ox Is Broken!. BenBella Books. ISBN 978-1-932100-91-4.
