= Green Bazaar =

Market in Almaty, Kazakhstan

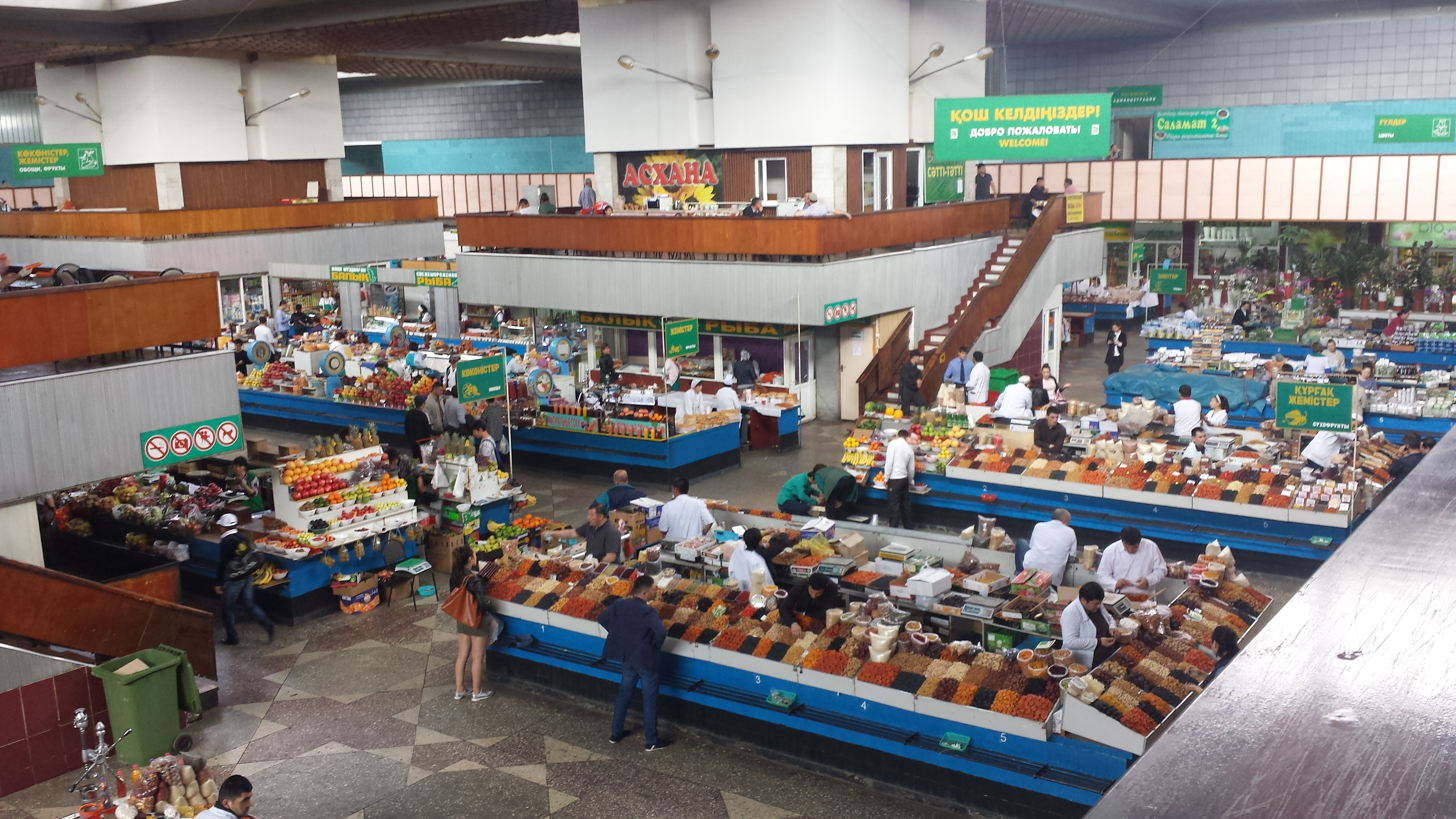
Interior of the bazaar

The Green Bazaar or Kök Bazar (Kazakh: Көк базар, romanized: Kök bazar; Russian: Зелёный базар, romanized: Zelyony bazar) is a public market in Almaty, Kazakhstan, located at the intersection of Zenkov and Jibek Joly streets. Since its inauguration in 1875, the bazaar has been an important trading point in Almaty. The market sells a wide variety of items, including spices, prepared foods, produce, textiles, furniture, and antiques.

The area originally served as a guest yard for traveling merchants and caravans. In 1887, Almaty suffered a major earthquake, which destroyed most of the area (including the market). In 1927, the bazaar was reconstructed and received the name Central Farm Market. However, it eventually became known as the Kök Bazaar. The market is a major tourist attraction in Almaty.

== History ==
In 1875, the Gostiny Dvor, which consisted of two low pavilions stretching along Torgovaya Street, was built on the territory of the shopping area, designed by the architect Jan Kozell-Poklevsky. The customer and sponsor of the construction was the Semipalatinsk merchant Sadyk Rafikov, one of the most influential people in the city of that time.

During this period, this complex was called "Gostiny Dvor and its merchants". It received visiting guests, entrepreneurs, trade agents from all over Central Asia, neighboring countries and even from island Japan. The market remained a monument not only to the commercial and industrial prosperity of the region, but also to architectural and urban planning art. Its stone shops, entertainment and entertainment attractions, storage sheds, shopping arcades, flowing irrigation ditches and fountains, erected for prayer by Muslim merchants. In its trade and other qualities, the bazaar was not inferior to the best markets of Turkestan. Visiting merchants set up their mansions along the perimeter of the business square. From the Kök Bazaar, the city began to grow to the southwest.

In 1887, a major earthquake happened in Verniy, as a result of which the city was severely destroyed. There was practically nothing left of Gostiny Dvor. After the earthquake, Gostiny Dvor was rebuilt, but lost its former importance as the city's main trading place, as the city authorities began to organize additional new bazaars focused on one type of product throughout the city: this is how hay, vegetable, horse and livestock markets appeared.

With the emergence of collective farms in the second half of the 1920s, large-scale trade in agricultural products, vegetables, and fruits resumed. In 1927, the Gostiny Dvor was rebuilt and acquired a new name Central Collective Farm Market. But among the people, the name Green Bazaar stuck more.

In the 1940s, the bazaar consisted of long, rectangular rows of canopies with wooden stalls. The bazaar also sold live cattle, dairy products, apples of the Almaty Aport variety. Fruits and vegetables were brought from the neighboring collective farms. During World War II, the bazaar was the only place where it continued to sell goods for money, and not give out by cards. But the prices were very high due to the war.

In the 1970s, the wooden market was demolished. In its place, in 1975, a covered building appeared in the style of brutalism. The main architect of the project was Mark Pavlov. The bazaar was designed as a structure of several levels. The main pavilion had 800 seats, the summer market had 200 seats, and the parking lot had 400 cars.

In 2017, a new shopping pavilion was built on the site of container pavilions and open trade counters, where an open market parking was located until the early 2000's. The pavilion area is about 20,000 square meters. Half of which is occupied by retail space and 10,000 sq. m., two-level car parking for 400 spaces. The project cost amounted to 2.5 billion tenge, with more than 500 jobs being created.

Since February 2021, "Social shops" have been opened to sell socially significant food products at reduced prices, such as potatoes, carrots, onions, cabbage, sugar, buckwheat, sunflower oil, rice, horns, flour.

In September 2021, a press tour was organized for 40 bloggers and journalists from Georgia, Armenia, Belarus, Russia, Ukraine, Turkey, Korea, UAE, Hong Kong.

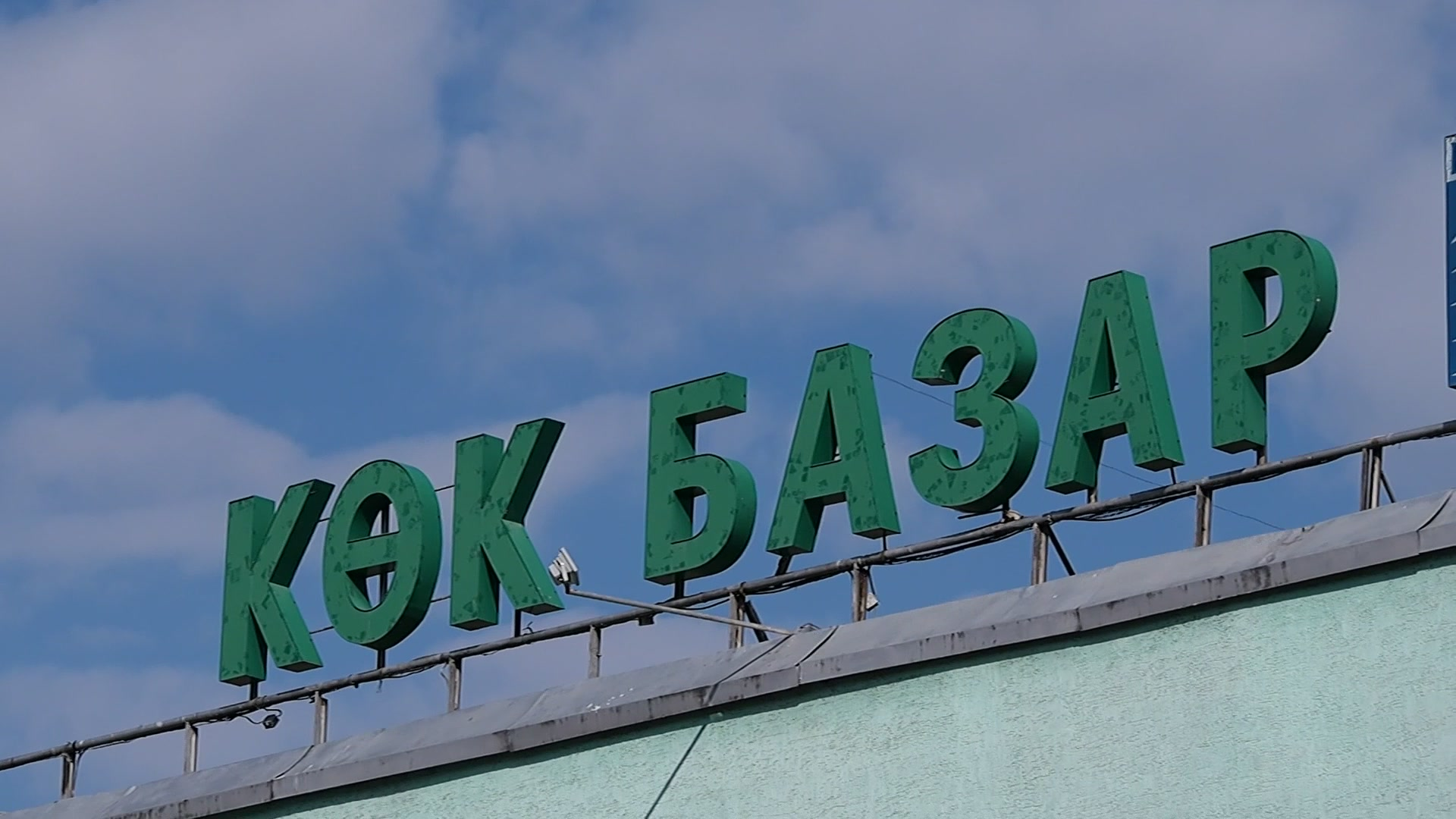
Signage in Kazakh

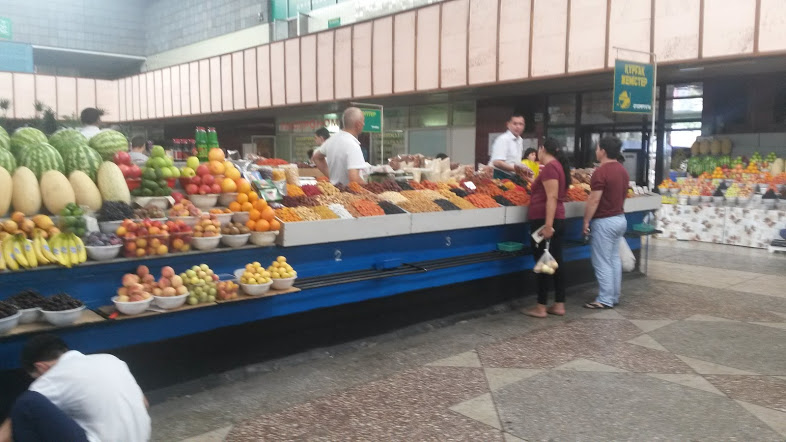
Fruits and vegetables

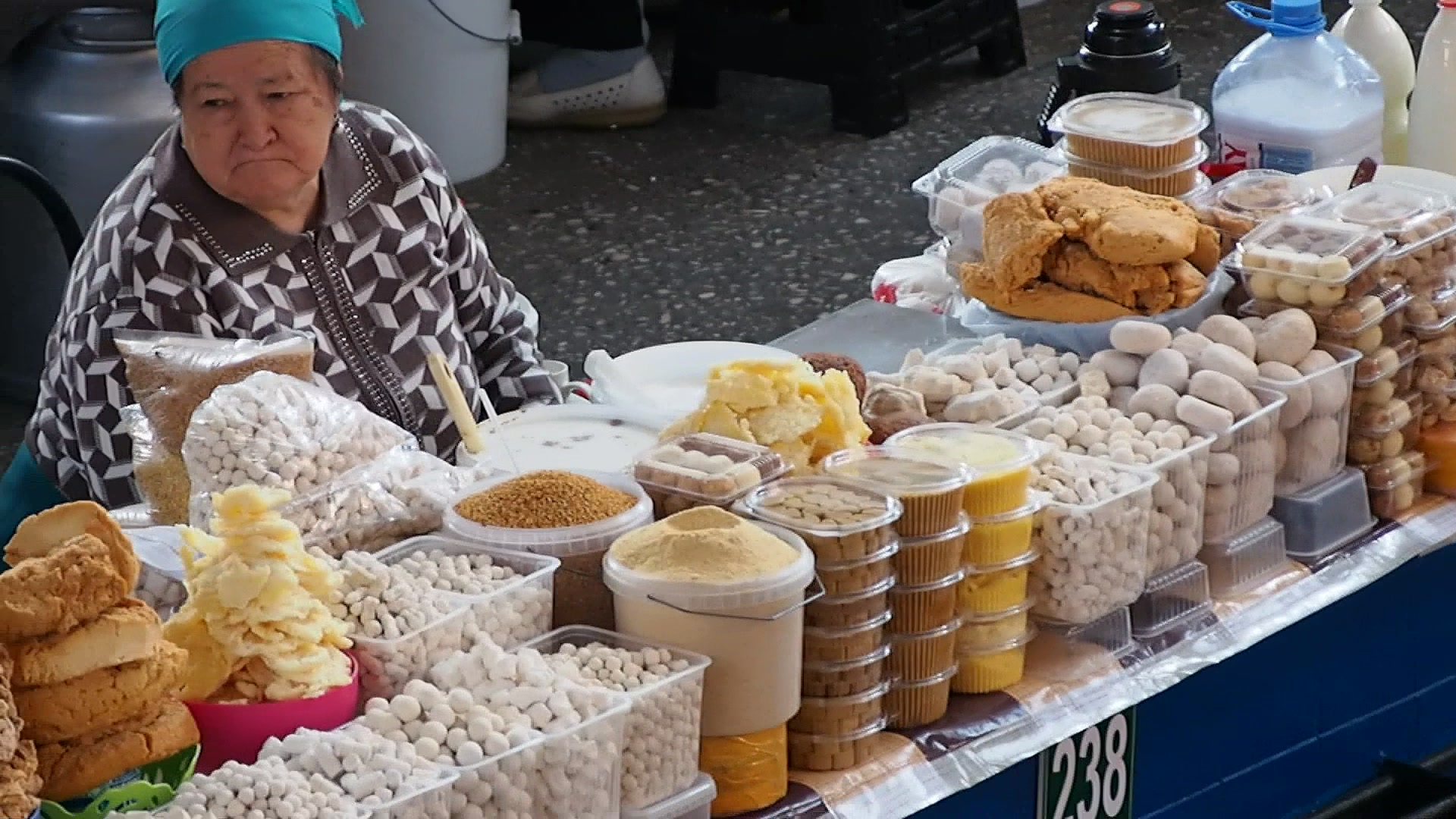
Kurt, talkan and kumys

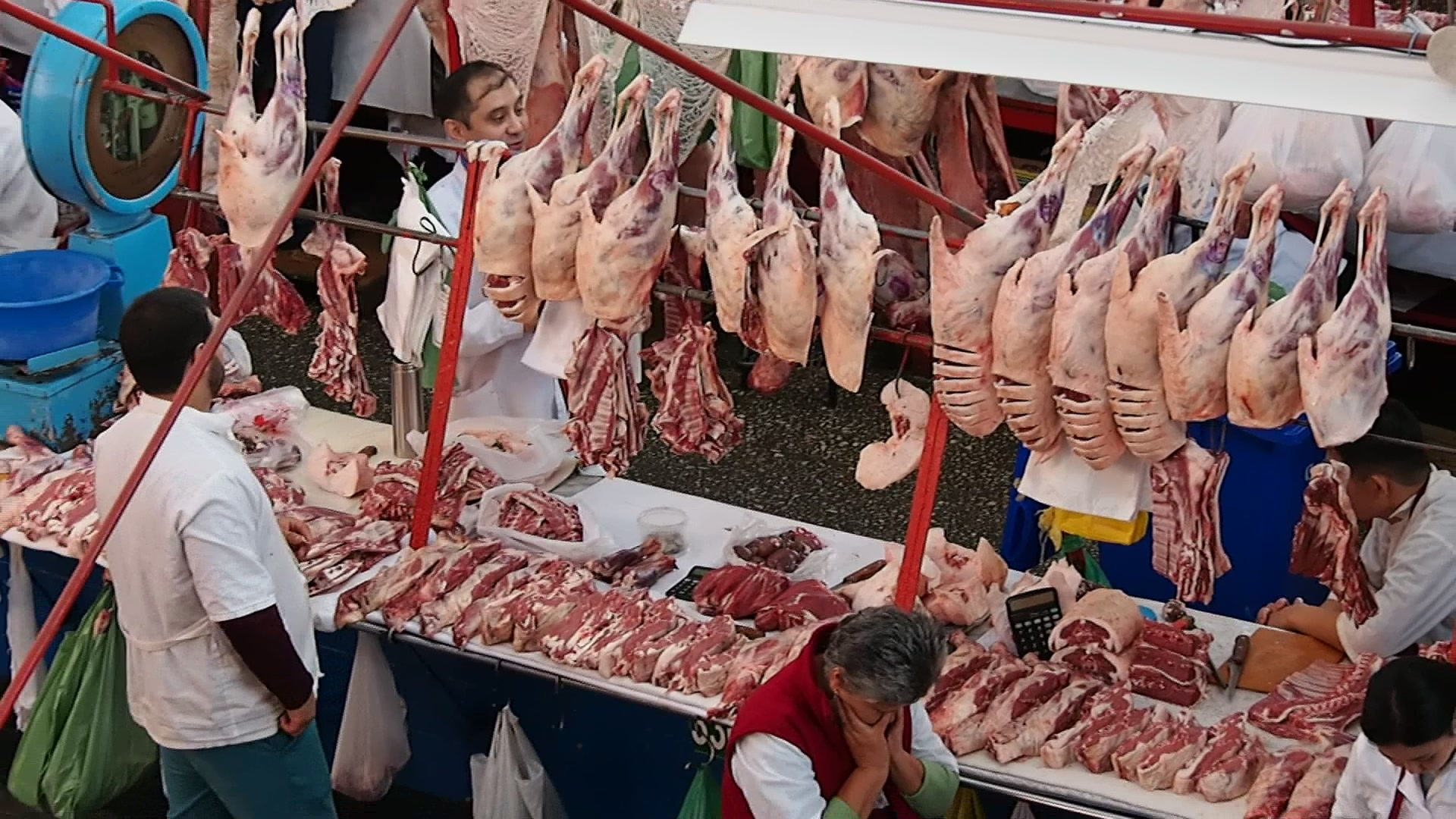
Meat

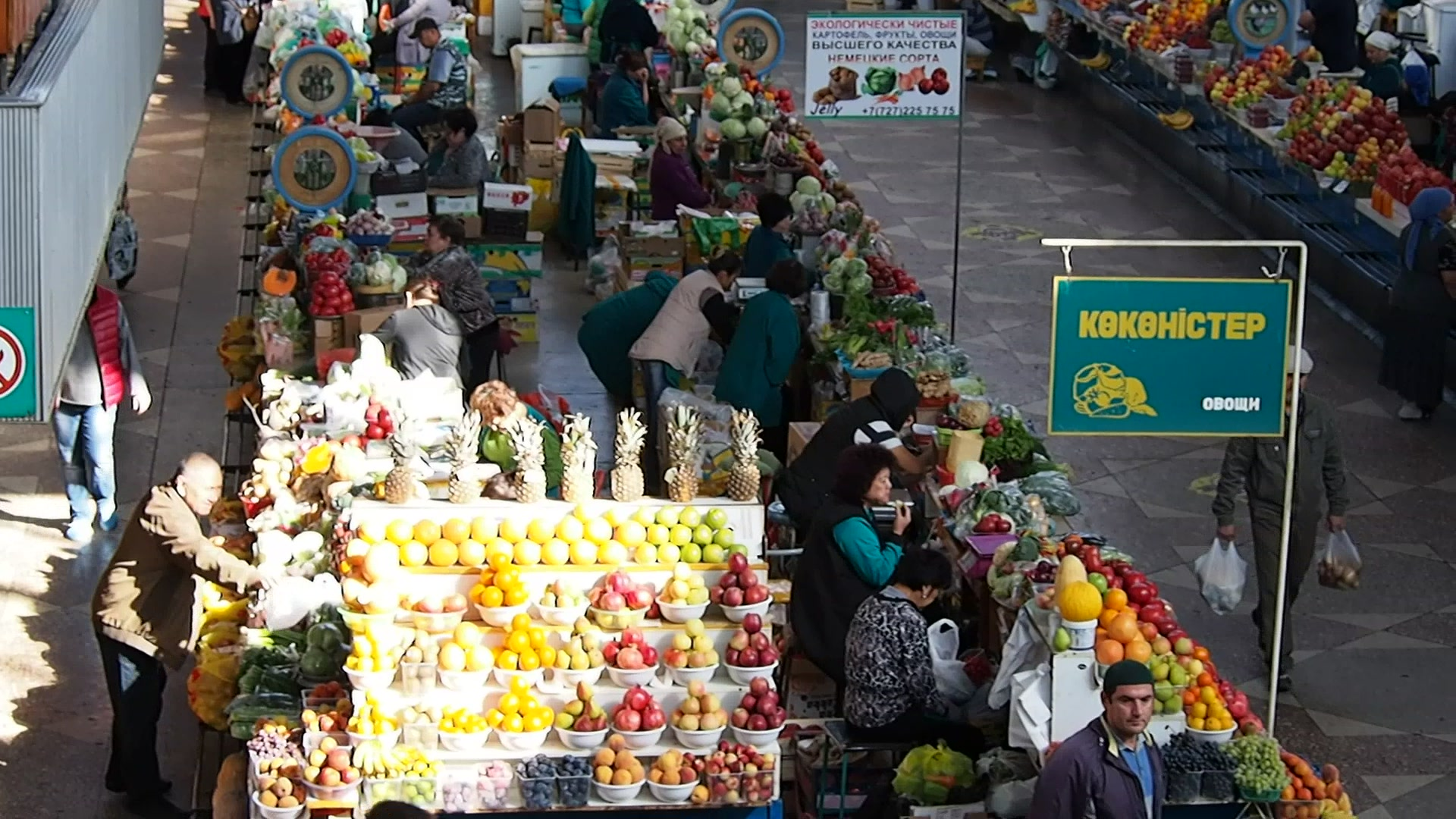
Vegetables, fruits and potatoes

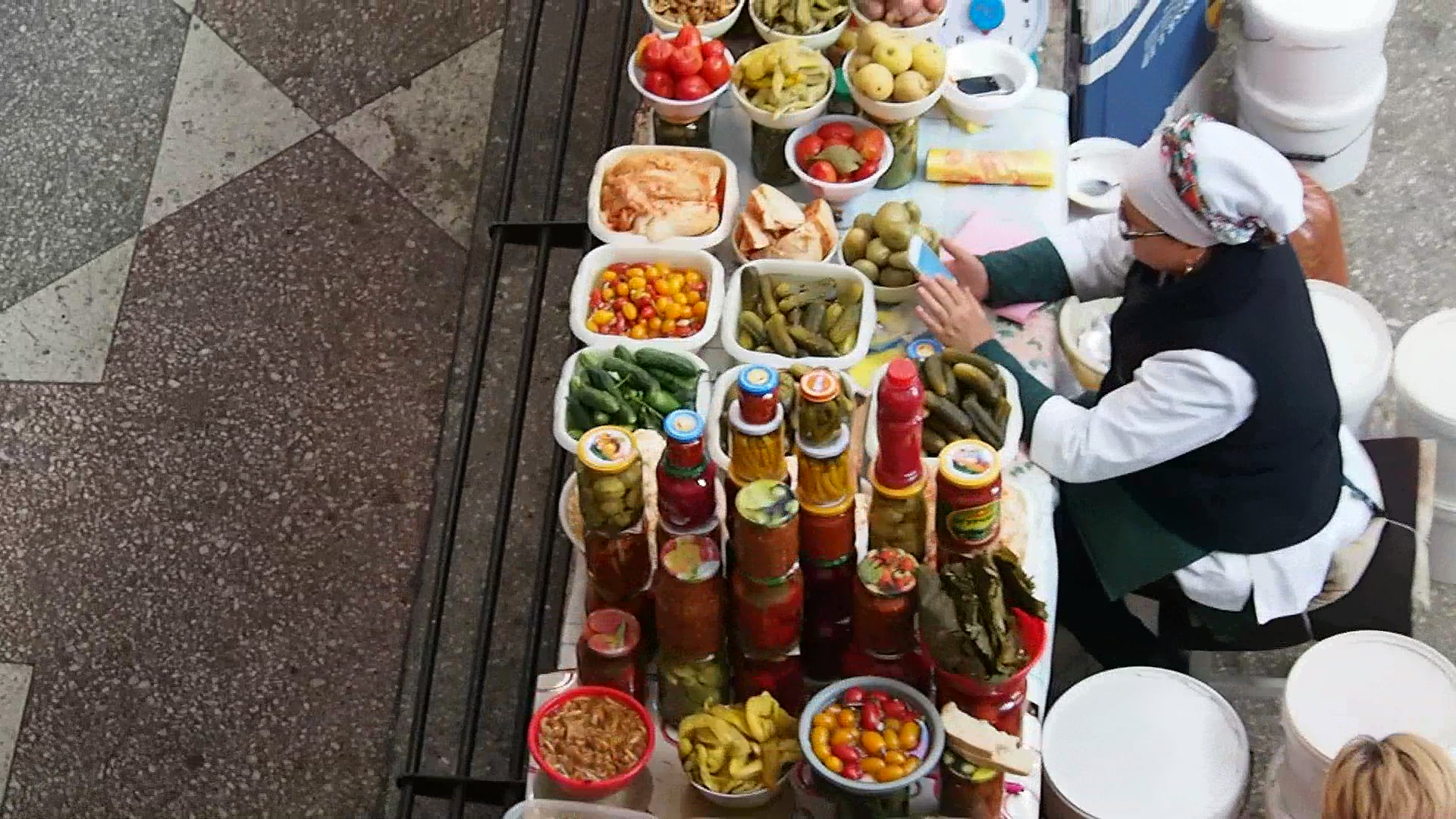
Pickles

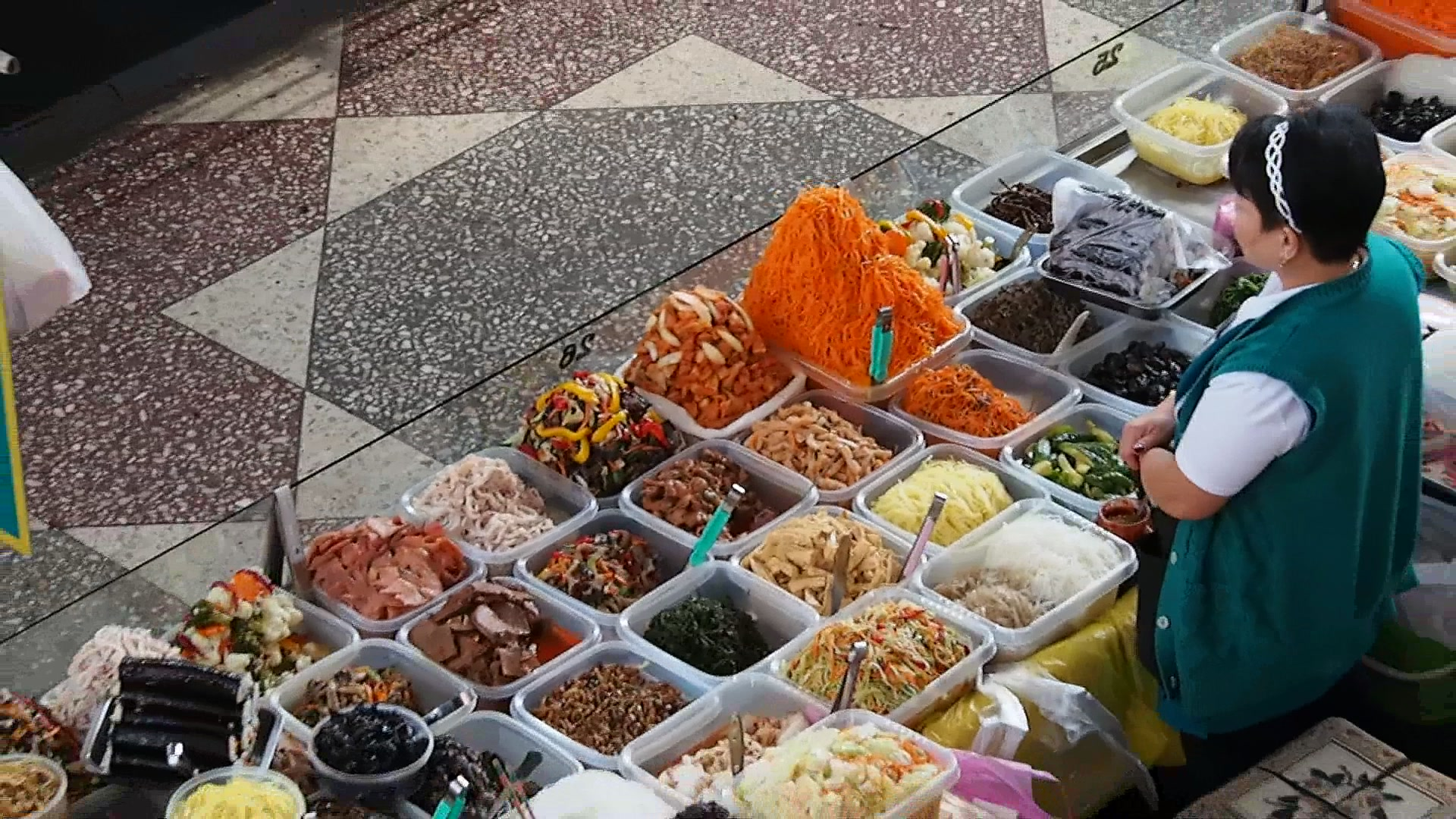
Korean salads

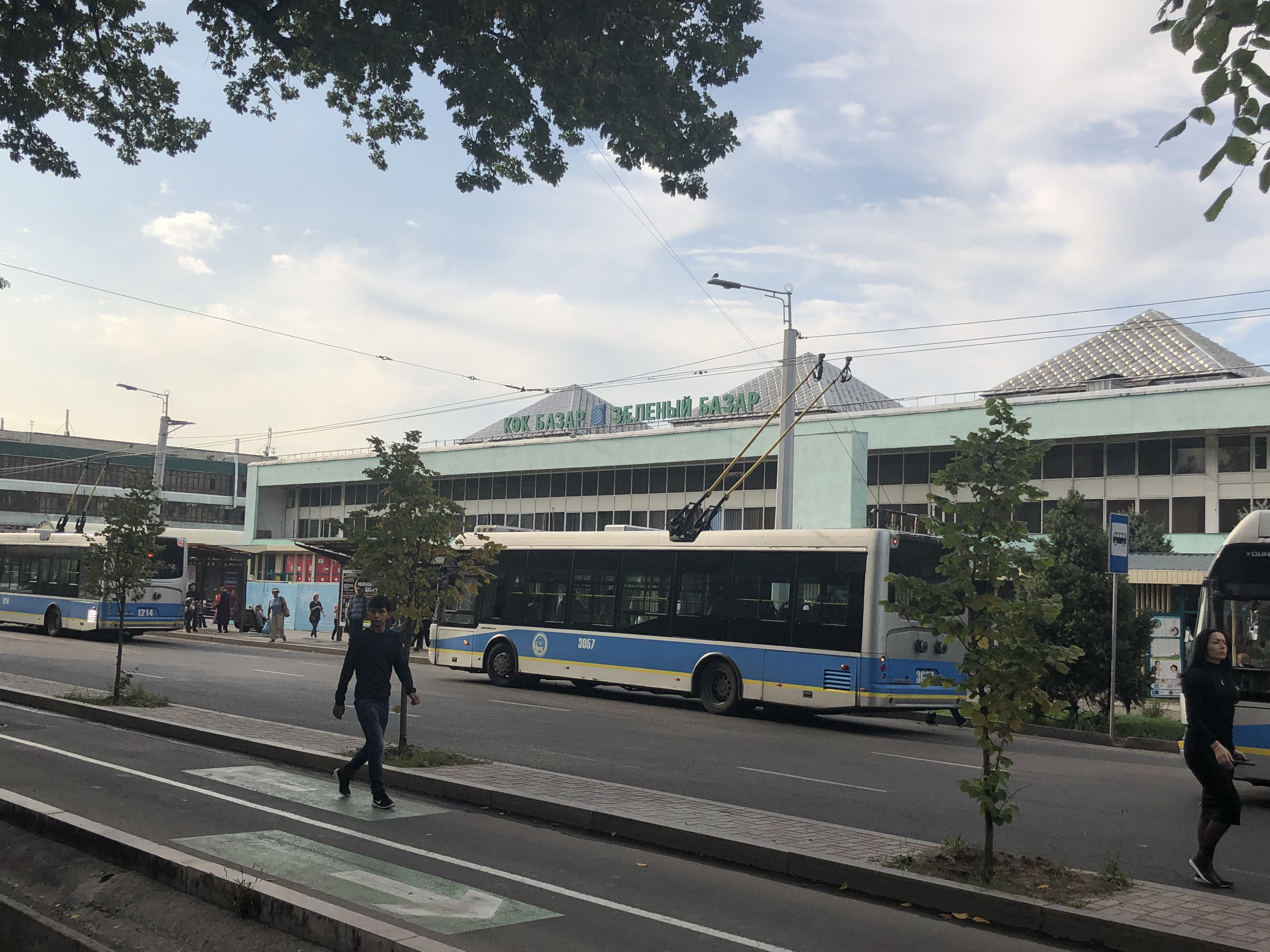
Exterior view

== Cultural references ==
Kök Bazaar is featured in the espionage novel Performance Anomalies, by Victor Robert Lee, set in Kazakhstan. The bazaar was also featured on The Amazing Race 13, The Amazing Race Norge 1, and The Amazing Race 32.
