= Tomb of Isa Khan =

Mausoleum in Delhi, India

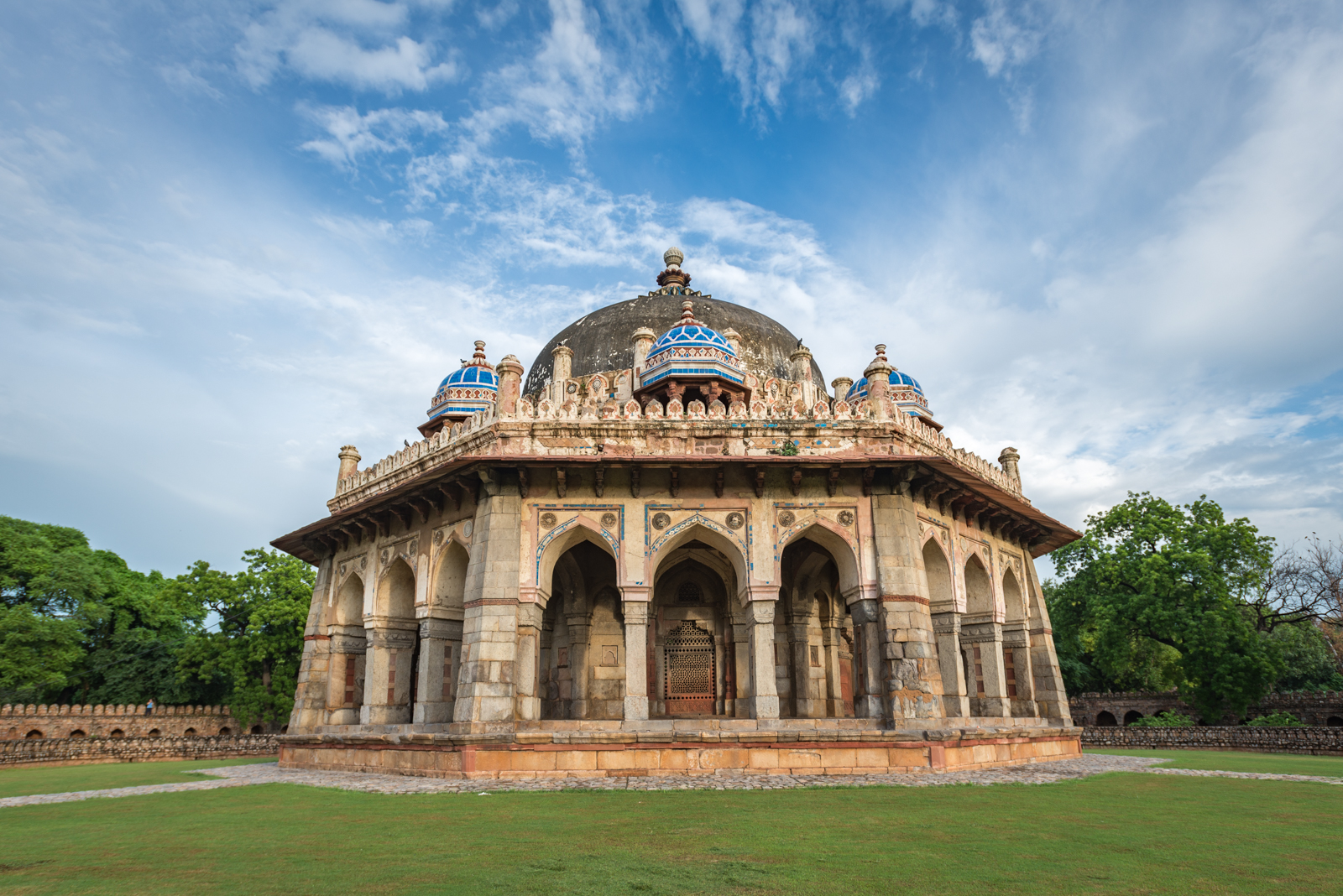
- Tomb of Isa Khan
- Interactive map of Tomb of Isa Khan
- Location: Humayun's tomb, Delhi, India
- Coordinates: 28.5922°N 77.2462°E
- Built: 1547–1548

UNESCO World Heritage Site
- Type: Cultural
- Criteria: (ii), (iv)
- Designated: 1993 (17th session)
- Part of: Humayun's Tomb
- Region: India

The tomb of the noble Isa Khan Niazi is located in the Humayun's Tomb complex in Delhi, India. The mausoleum, octagonal in shape and built mainly of red sandstone, was built in 1547–1548 during the reign of Sher Shah Suri. The mosque of Isa Khan is located west of the mausoleum, which along with other buildings form the UNESCO World Heritage Site of Humayun's tomb complex.

== History ==
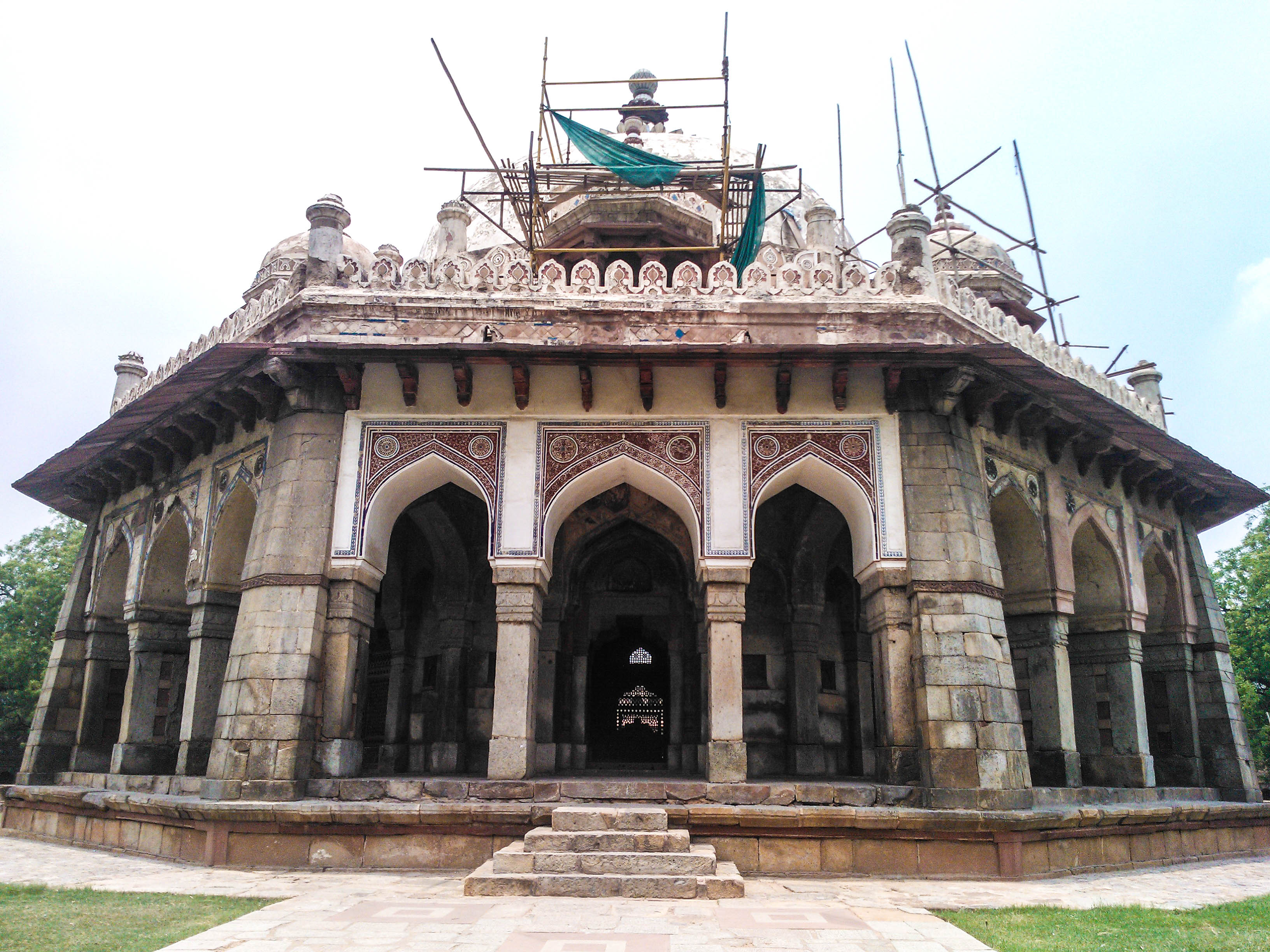
Comprehensive restoration work was done through the Aga Khan Trust for Culture (AKTC), in collaboration with the Archaeological Survey of India (ASI), in 2011-2015

The mausoleum houses the tomb of Isa Khan Niazi, who was a noble at the courts of Sher Shah Suri and Islam Shah Suri. It is situated south of the Bu Halima's Garden in the Humayun's Tomb complex. An inscription at the tomb mentions that it was built in c. 1547–1548. It also says the tomb is an "asylum of paradise" built during the reign of Sher Shah. The mosque, located west of the mausoleum, was built in c. 1547.

Comprehensive restoration work was done through the Aga Khan Trust for Culture (AKTC), in collaboration with Archaeological Survey of India (ASI) in 2011-2015.

== Architecture ==
=== Mausoleum ===
The tomb was constructed in the Lodi style architectural. Its octagonal shape, the hallmark of the Lodhi era, stands on a low plinth. Verandahs surround the central chamber. Each side of the chamber consists of three arches with one chajja (roof) present over each. The mausoleum's architectural style is similar to those of Mubarak Shah, Muhammad Shah, Khan-i-Jahan Tilangani and Sikander Lodi.

The mausoleum is built mainly with grey quartzite with red sandstone used for ornamentation. Stucco plaster envelops the rough masonry. Different coloured tiles have been used on the walls for decoration. The tomb's gateway stands on a one-metre-high (3.3 ft) podium reached by stairs. The square head doorway of the gate chamber has been built in Hindu architectural style.

Inside the mausoleum, the tomb is enclosed by an inner octagonal wall. Other than the southern and western walls, the other walls consist of jalis (latticed screens), which are recessed. These recesses, in turn, contain four-centred arches. The western wall has the main mihrab (a semi-circular niche in the wall which indicates the direction of Mecca, the direction in which Muslims pray). The mihrab is four centred and bordered by Quranic verses. The southern wall includes the main entrance to the building. The medallion located at the centre of the dome is ornamented with Persian floral designs. It also has a Quranic verse.

The tomb chamber consists of six tombs—two large and four smaller. Sandstone slabs are used to pave the floor. The cenotaph of Isa Khan Niazi is made of red sandstone and marble.

=== Mosque ===
The central dome resembles that of the Qila-i-Kuhna Mosque at Purana Qila. The side domes are raised on pillars and resemble pavilions. The single prayer chamber is divided into three bays. The mosque's central bay is made of red sandstone, the side-bays of grey stone. Each bay houses a four-arched gateway to the mosque, whose borders are decorated with green and blue tiles. The corners of the central bay are adorned with pinnacles. According to the Archaeological Survey of India, the mosque is simpler in comparison to the mausoleum.

There are three equal-sized arches on each facade supported by stone pilasters. Blue and green tiles border the arches. A frame made of red stone contains the central arch. These features were inspired by the Moth ki Masjid mosque in Delhi. The side arches are made of grey stone and decorated with stucco. The medallions on the spandrels of these arches contain floral designs inlaid with blue and green tiles, a feature of Moorish architecture.

The mosque stands on a one-metre-high (3.3 ft) platform. Its interior is plain, and the floor is simply plastered. The lateral domes are built on pendentives, while the central dome rises from squinches on a 16-sided drum. Its pavilions, supported by stone pillars, are adorned with blue tiles.

The mosque contains three mihrabs of equal size, carved of stone, containing calligraphy.

== Gallery ==
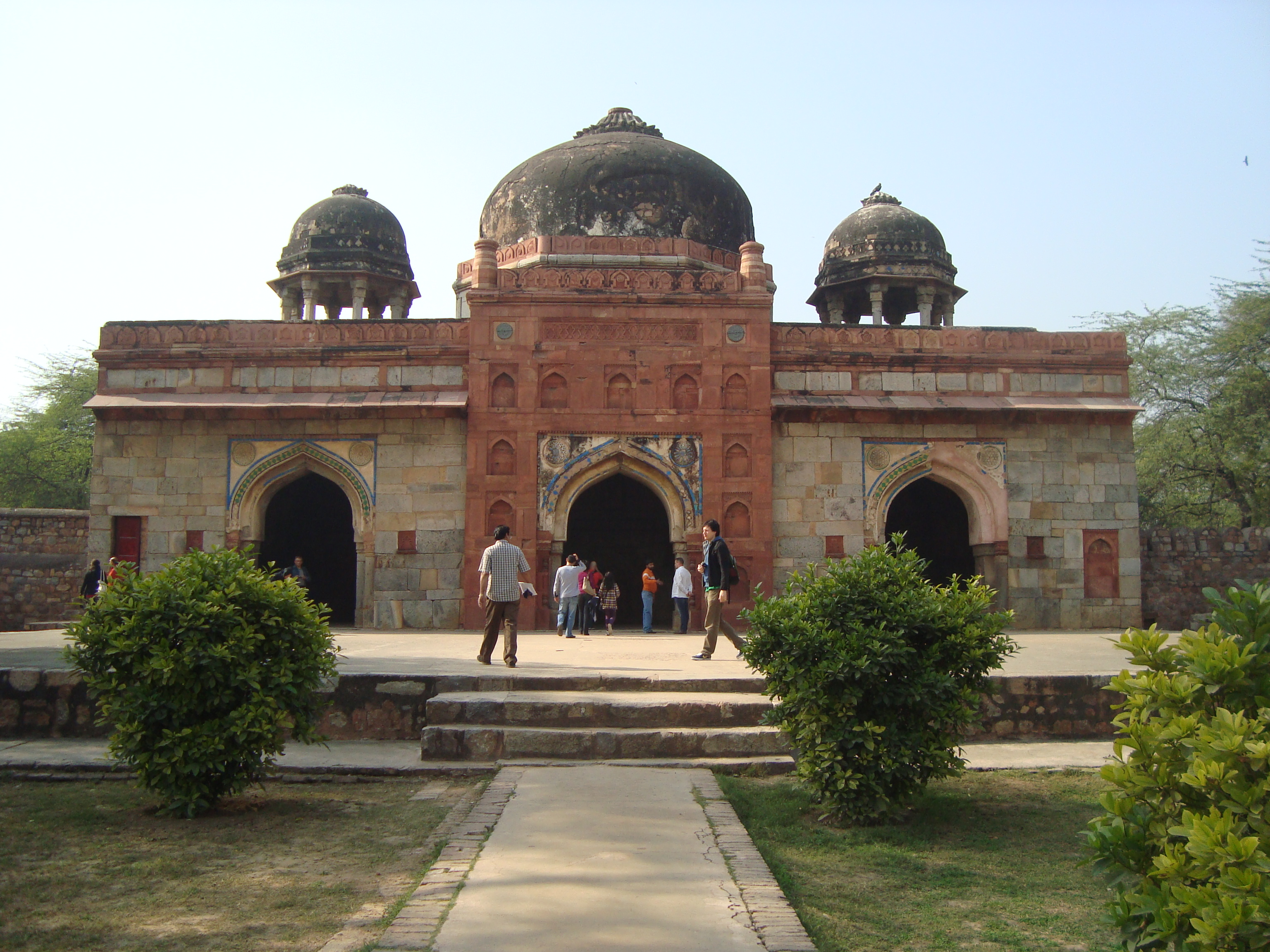
Mosque of Isa Khan

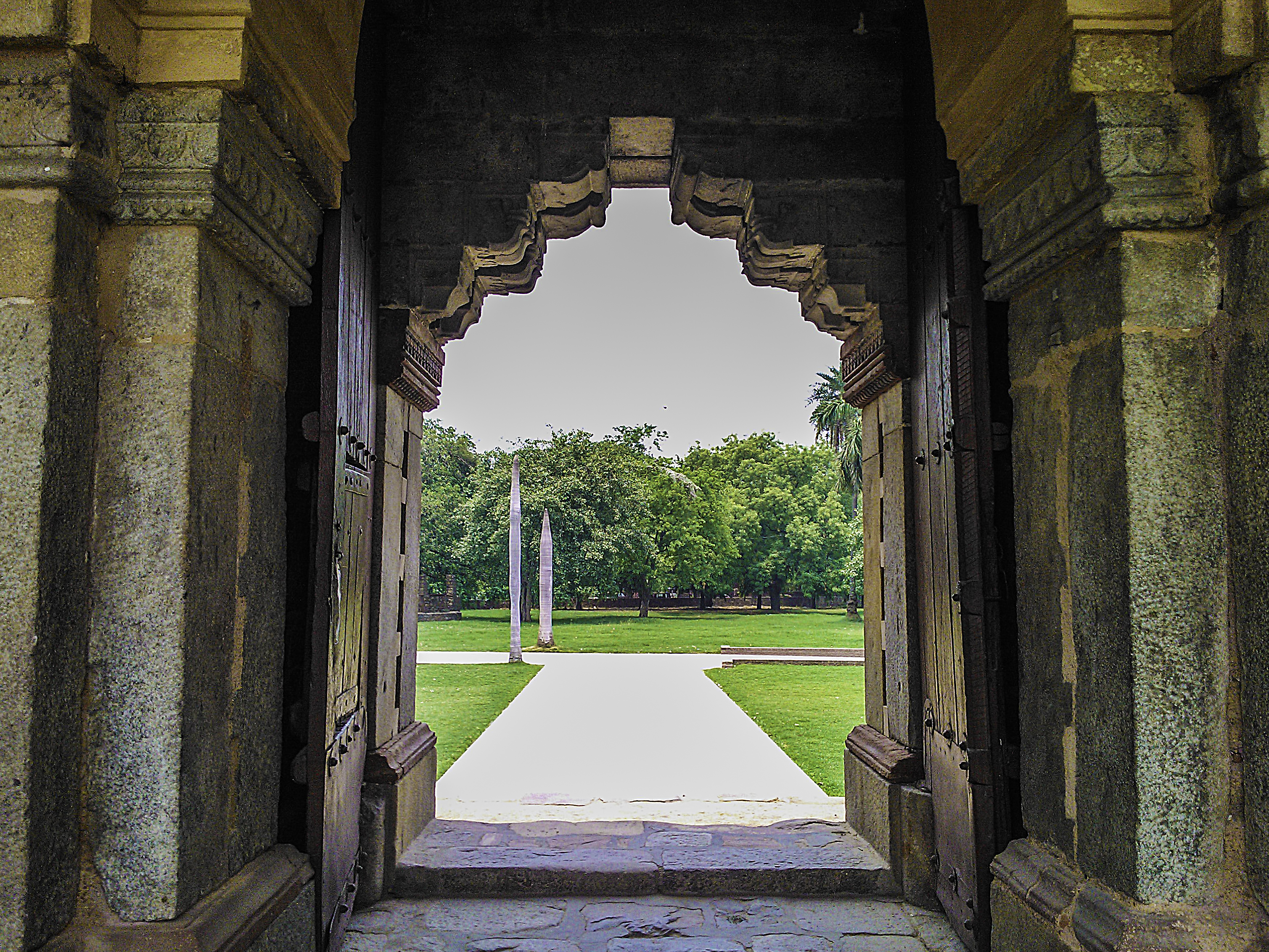
Doorway of the mausoleum

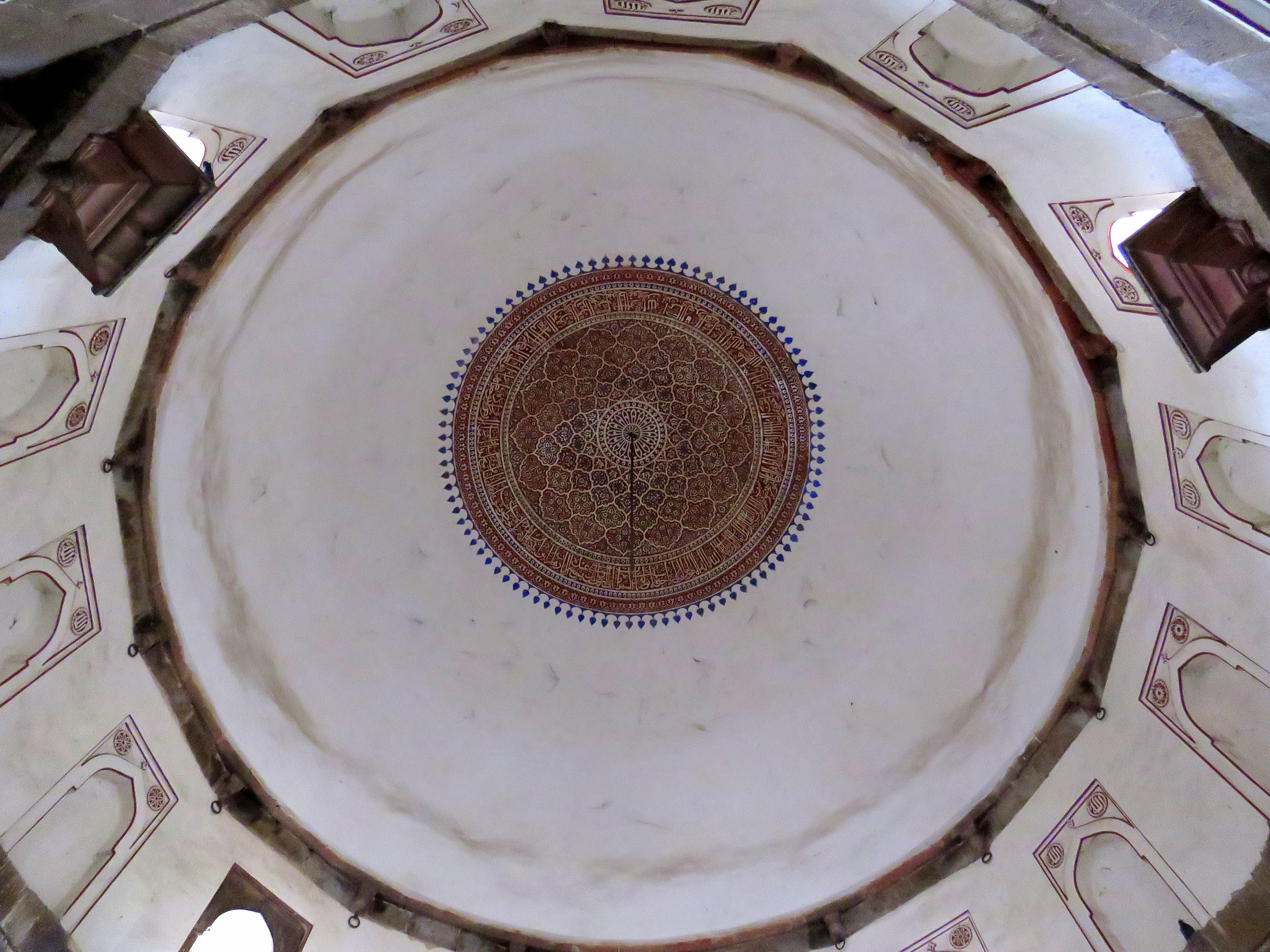
Pendallion of the central dome

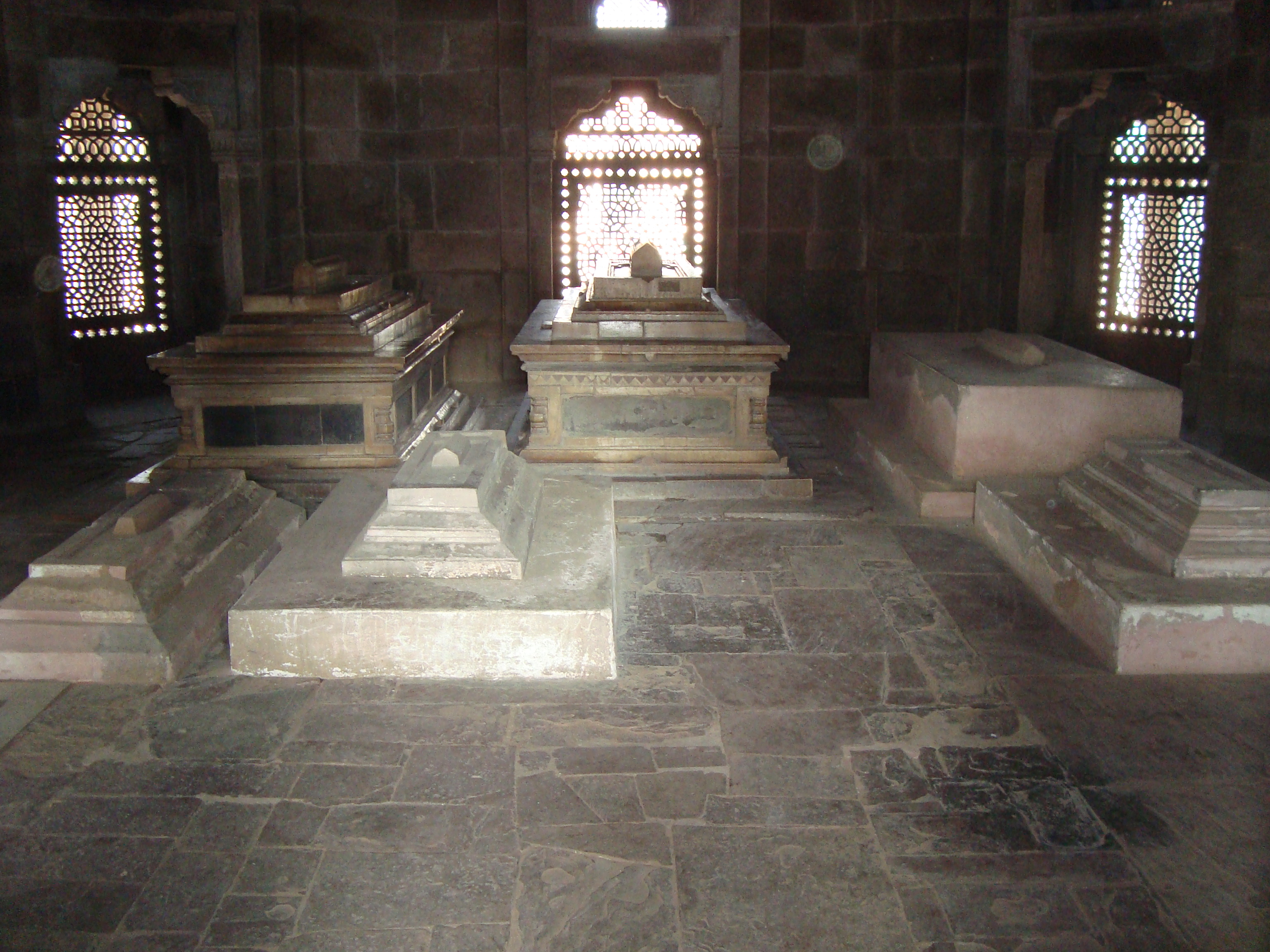
Cenotaphs inside the central tomb chamber
