= List of Catholic churches in Salvador, Bahia =

| Image | Church (English) | Church (Portuguese) | Year | Location | Notes/References |
|---|---|---|---|---|---|
| | Basilica of the Immaculate Conception, Salvador | Igreja de Nossa Senhora da Conceição da Praia | 1767 | Comércio; 12.975352°S 38.514284°W | Also known as Igreja Basílica de Nossa Senhora da Conceição da Praia. Bahia. Secretaria da Indústria e Comércio (1984:35–38), Carrazzoni (1987:93–94) |
| | Casa Pia and College of the Orphans of Saint Joachim | Casa Pia e Colégio dos Órfãos de São Joaquim | 1709 | Santo Antônio Além do Carmo; 12.969201°S 38.507507°W | Bahia. Secretaria da Indústria e Comércio (1984:75–76), Carrazzoni (1987:72). |
| | Cathedral Basilica of Salvador | Catedral Basílica de Salvador | 1600s | Historic Center; 12.972897°S 38.51033°W | Also known as Cathedral, Former Church of the Jesuit College. Bahia. Secretaria da Indústria e Comércio (1984:23–24), Carrazzoni (1987:94). |
| | Chapel of Loreto | Capela do Loreto | 1645 | Ilha dos Frades; 12.757618°S 38.623972°W | Bahia. Secretaria da Indústria e Comércio (1984:101). |
| | Church of Our Lady of Penha | Igreja de Nossa Senhora da Penha | 1742 | Ribeira; 12.909647°S 38.496483°W | Carrazzoni (1987:98), Bahia. Secretaria da Indústria e Comércio (1984:79–80). |
| | Chapel of Our Lady of the Ladder | Capela de Nossa Senhora da Escada | 1566 | Escada; 12.881196°S 38.482931°W | Carrazzoni (1987:69), Bahia. Secretaria da Indústria e Comércio (1984:95–96). |
| | Chapel of Our Lady of the Snows | Capela de Nossa Senhora das Neves | 1552 | Ilha de Maré; 12.793411°S 38.519948°W | Bahia. Secretaria da Indústria e Comércio (1984:93–94). |
| | Chapel of Saint Lazarus | Capela de São Lázaro | 1734 | Federação; 13.007920°S 38.511886°W | Also known as Igreja de São Lázaro e São Roque. Bahia. Secretaria da Indústria e Comércio (1984:107–108). |
| | Chapel of the Holy Body | Capela do Corpo Santo | 1711 | Comércio; 12.973340°S 38.512949°W | Also known as the Capela de São Pedro Gonçalves do Corpo Santo or Capela de São Pedro Gonçalves do Corpo Santo. Carrazzoni (1987:69–70), Bahia. Secretaria da Indústria e Comércio (1984:49–50). |
| | Church and Convent of Our Lady of Mount Carmel | Igreja e Convento de Nossa Senhora do Carmo | 1800s | Historic Center; 12.968559°S 38.50721°W | Bahia. Secretaria da Indústria e Comércio (1984:19–20), Carrazzoni (1987:95–96). |
| | Church and Convent of Our Lady of the Palm | Igreja e Convento de Nossa Senhora da Palma | 1630 | Nazaré; 12.977683°S 38.510854°W | Bahia. Secretaria da Indústria e Comércio (1984:45–46), Carrazzoni (1987:97–98) |
| | Church and Convent of Our Lady of Solitude | Igreja e Convento de Nossa Senhora da Soledade | 1738 | Liberdade; 12.957936°S 38.499133°W | Bahia. Secretaria da Indústria e Comércio (1984:117–118). |
| | Church and Convent of Our Lady of the Conception of Lapa | Igreja e Convento de Nossa Senhora da Conceição da Lapa | 1734 | Nazaré; 12.981304°S 38.512510°W | Bahia. Secretaria da Indústria e Comércio (1984:13–14). |
| | Church and Convent of Our Lady of the Exile | Igreja e Convento de Nossa Senhora do Desterro | 1681 | Nazaré; 12.977101°S 38.506662°W | Bahia. Secretaria da Indústria e Comércio (1984:11–12). |
| | Church and Convent of Saint Teresa | Igreja e Convento de Santa Teresa | 1668 | Dois de Julho; 12.978929°S 38.516286°W | Now the Museu de Arte Sacra da Bahia. Bahia. Secretaria da Indústria e Comércio (1984:51–52). |
| | São Francisco Church and Convent | Igreja e Convento de São Francisco | 1723 | Historic Center; 12.9746°S 38.5091°W | Carrazzoni (1987:95) |
| | Church and Hospice of Our Lady of the Good Journey | Igreja e Hospício de Nossa Senhora da Boa Viagem | 1700s | Monte Serrat; 12.931352°S 38.513948°W | Bahia. Secretaria da Indústria e Comércio (1984:59–60). |
| | Church and Monastery of Our Lady of Grace | Igreja e Mosteiro de Nossa Senhora da Graça | 1679 | Graça; 12.999634°S 38.523636°W | Bahia. Secretaria da Indústria e Comércio (1984:71–72). |
| | Church and Monastery of Our Lady of Monserrate | Igreja e Mosteiro de Nossa Senhora do Monte Serrat | 1650 | Monte Serrat; 12.928766°S 38.519383°W | Bahia. Secretaria da Indústria e Comércio (1984:73–74). |
| | Church and Monastery of Saint Benedict | Igreja e Mosteiro de São Bento | 1652 | Nazaré; 12.979326°S 38.514060°W | Bahia. Secretaria da Indústria e Comércio (1984:69–70). |
| | Church and Santa Casa da Misericórdia | Igreja e Santa Casa de Misericórdia | 1600s | Historic Center; 12.973744°S 38.511858°W | Bahia. Secretaria da Indústria e Comércio (1984:31–34). |
| | Church of Our Lady of Barroquinha | Igreja de Nossa Senhora da Barroquinha | 1700s | Dois de Julho; 12.977378°S 38.513851°W | Bahia. Secretaria da Indústria e Comércio (1984:81–82), Carrazzoni (1987:96–97) |
| | Church of Our Lady of Health and Glory | Igreja de Nossa Senhora da Saúde e Glória | 1723 | Saúde; 12.972511°S 38.505855°W | Bahia. Secretaria da Indústria e Comércio (1984:83–84), Carrazzoni (1987:99) |
| | Church of Our Lady of Victory | Igreja de Nossa Senhora da Vitória | 1561 | Vitória; 12.996196°S 38.527956°W | |
| | Church of Nosso Senhor do Bonfim | Igreja do Senhor do Bonfim | 1754 | Bonfim; 12.924°S 38.508°W | Bahia. Secretaria da Indústria e Comércio (1984:47–48). |
| | Church of Saint Antony of Barra | Igreja de Santo António da Barra | 1600s | Barra; 13.001257°S 38.532225°W | Bahia. Secretaria da Indústria e Comércio (1984:63–64). |
| | Church of Saint Michael | Igreja de São Miguel | 1700s | Historic Center; 12.974142°S 38.507788°W | Bahia. Secretaria da Indústria e Comércio (1984:29–30). |
| | Church of Saint Peter of the Clergymen | Igreja de São Pedro dos Clérigos | 1709 | Historic Center; 12.973°S 38.509437°W | Bahia. Secretaria da Indústria e Comércio (1984:85–86). |
| | Church of the Blessed Sacrament at Rua do Passo | Igreja do Santíssimo Sacramento da Rua do Passo | 1718 | Historic Center; 12.969613°S 38.508219°W | Bahia. Secretaria da Indústria e Comércio (1984:39–40). |
| | Church of the Blessed Sacrament of Saint Anne | Igreja do Santíssimo Sacramento de Sant'Ana | 1700s | Nazaré; 12.976880°S 38.508501°W | Bahia. Secretaria da Indústria e Comércio (1984:87–88). |
| | Church of the Third Order of Mount Carmel | Igreja da Ordem Terceira do Carmo | 1709 | Historic Center; 12.969201°S 38.507507°W | Bahia. Secretaria da Indústria e Comércio (1984:65–66). |
| | Church of the Third Order of Our Lady of the Rosary of the Black People | Igreja da Ordem Terceira de Nossa Senhora do Rosário dos Pretos | 1700s | Historic Center; 12.97111°S 38.508067°W | Bahia. Secretaria da Indústria e Comércio (1984:43–44), Carrazzoni (1987:100) |
| | Church of the Third Order of Penitence of Saint Dominic of Osma | Igreja da Ordem Terceira da Penitência de São Domingos de Gusmão | 1800s | Historic Center; 12.973391°S 38.509343°W | Carrazzoni (1987:94–95) |
| | Church of the Third Order of Saint Francis | Igreja da Ordem Terceira de São Francisco | 1703 | Historic Center; 12.974671°S 38.509052°W | Carrazzoni (1987:95) |
| | Church of the Third Order of the Blessed Virgin Mary of Our Lady of the Conception of the Mulatto Brothers | Igreja da Ordem Terceira da Beata Maria Virgem de Nossa Senhora da Conceição dos Irmãos Pardos | 1758 | Santo Antônio Além do Carmo; 12.966278°S 38.505722°W | Carrazzoni (1987:99–100) |
| | Convent of Bom Jesus dos Perdões and Chapel of Mercy | Recolhimento do Bom Jesus dos Perdões e Capela da Piedade | 1700s | Santo Antônio Além do Carmo; 12.964617°S 38.502862°W | Carrazzoni (1987:89–90) |
| | Oratory of Cruz do Pascoal | Oratório da Cruz do Pascoal | 1743 | Santo Antônio Além do Carmo; 12.967485°S 38.506840°W | Lins (2012) |
| | Parish Church of Our Lady of Pilar | Igreja Matriz de Nossa Senhora do Pilar | 1756 | Comércio; 12.965910°S 38.506696°W | Carrazzoni (1987:99–100) |
