= Nazaré (neighbourhood) =

- Location of Nazaré in Brazil
- Coordinates (Nazaré): 12.973016°S 38.513917°W
- Country: Brazil
- City: Salvador
- Time zone: UTC-3
- Area code: +55 71

Nazaré is a neighborhood in the city of Salvador, Bahia, Brazil. The region of present-day Nazaré was chiefly rural until the 19th century. It developed below the Historic Center of the city around the freguesias, or historical settlements of São Pedro, Santana do Sacramento, and later, Nossa Senhora de Brotas. Avenida Joana Angélica, a broad avenue, crosses the neighborhood from north-east to south-west. The avenue is named for Joana Angélica, a Brazilian Conceptionist nun and martyr of Brazilian Independence. Joana Angélica was stabbed by a bayonet at the Convent of Lapa by Portuguese colonial troops. Nazaré is home to numerous historic structures of the city; it is additionally home of several government and academic centers.

== Districts ==
- Saúde
- Tororó
- Jardim Baiano

== Historic structures ==
- Church of the Blessed Sacrament of Saint Anne
- Academy of Letters of Bahia (Solar dos Calmons)
- Asilo dos Expostos
- Asilo Santa Izabel
- Casa do Barão do Rio Real
- Church and Convent of Our Lady of the Conception of Lapa
- Church and Convent of Our Lady of the Exile
- Church of Our Lady of Health and Glory
- Church of Our Lady of the Palm
- Church of Santo Antônio da Mouraria
- Fonte do Gravatá
- Hospital Santa Izabel
- House at Avenida Joana Angélica no. 149
- House at Rua do Genipapeiro no. 65
- House at Rua do Gravatá no. 55
- House at Rua Felipe Camarão no. 34
