= Vitória da Encarnação =

Brazilian nun from Bahia (1881 –1715)

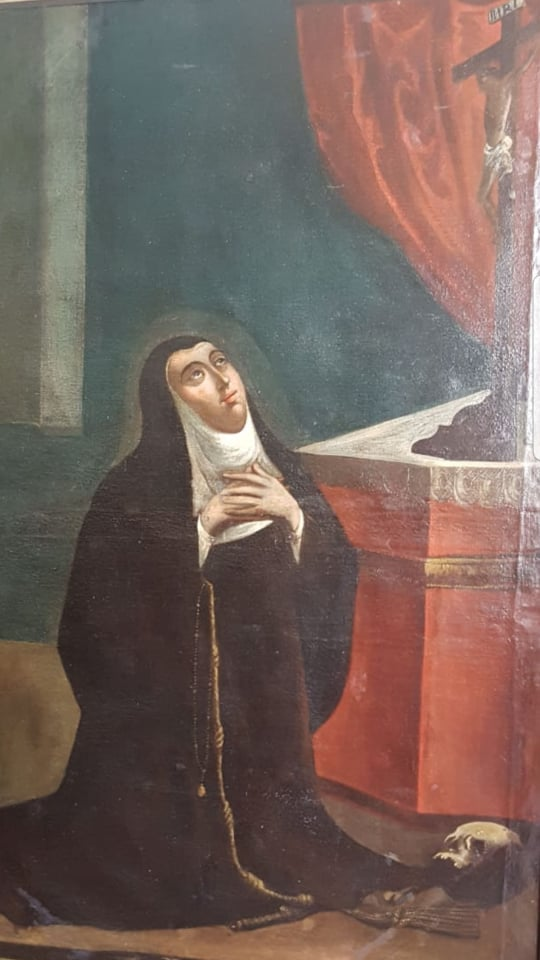
- Life-size painting representing Madre Vitória da Encarnação at prayer. It is hung in the cell where she died in the Convento de Santa Clara do Desterro in Bahia.

Personal life
- Born: 6 March 1661 Salvador, Bahia, Brazil
- Died: 19 July 1715 (aged 54)

Religious life
- Religion: Roman Catholic
- Order: Sisters of the Poor Clares

Vitória da Encarnação (6 March 1661 – 19 July 1715) was a Brazilian Catholic nun in the Church and Convent of Our Lady of the Exile (Portuguese: Igreja e Convento de Nossa Senhora do Destêrro), the first female convent in Salvador, Bahia.

The case for Vitória da Encarnação's beatification was opened in 2019. In 2021, the Archbishop of Bahia Dom Sérgio da Rocha praised the nun, saying "We have a great deal to learn from Madre Vitória da Encarnação. She is a symbol of all the Church seeks: prayer, contemplation, fraternal life, charity, poverty, detachment, and a life of simplicity. If not this way, there is not space for God in your heart."

== Early life ==
Madre Vitória da Encarnação was born in Salvador, Bahia, on 6 March 1661 and baptized in the old Cathedral of Salvador. She was the daughter of Infantry Captain Bartolomeu Nabo Correia and Luísa Bixarxe, and had one brother and three sisters.

In 1677 when the Church and Convent of Our Lady of the Exile was founded, Madre Vitória da Encarnação's father wished for her and her older sister Maria da Conceição to enter and profess as nuns. However, at age sixteen, Vitória da Encarnação was not interested in a religious life, reportedly saying to her father that she would rather have her head cut off than enter the convent.

A few years later, Vitória began to have frequent dreams about the Virgin Mary and Baby Jesus calling her to a religious life. Despite the frequency of these dreams, Vitória initially still did not want to enter the convent, but after a particularly vivid nightmare of a ship in a terrible storm at sea where impious people faced damnation but the religious passengers were contentedly on the path to salvation, she embraced a religious life. Vitória da Encarnação and her sister joined the Poor Claires as a novice at the Church and Convent of Our Lady of the Exile (Desterro) on 29 September 1686 (the Day of Archangel Michael).

In 1720, five years after Madre Vitória da Encarnação's death, the Portuguese Archbishop of Bahia Dom Sebastião Monteiro da Vide wrote her biography História da Vida e Morte da Madre Soror Victória da Encarnação (English, History of the Life and Death of Mother Victória da Encarnação), highlighting her piety. Dom Sebastião Monteiro da Vide intended to propose her for canonization, but died before the process moved forward.

Historian William de Souza Martins argues that Monteiro da Vide's hagiography of Madre Vitória da Encarnação shows the influence of contemporary models of female piety and devotion from the period, including Saint Catherine of Siena and Saint Rose of Lima.
