= Holy Body =

Holy Body is a phrase usually referring to the Body of Christ or the Feast of Corpus Christi. It may also refer to:

- Chapel of the Holy Body: a Roman Catholic church in Salvador, Bahia, Brazil
- Corp Naomh: a 10th-century Irish reliquary depicting the Body of Christ
- Holy Body Tattoo: a contemporary dance troupe in Vancouver, British Columbia, Canada
