= Urânia Vanério =

Brazilian teacher, writer and translator

- Born: December 14, 1811; Salvador, Bahia
- Died: December 3, 1849 (aged 37); Salvador, Bahia
- Resting place: Church of the Holy House of Mercy
- Education: Desire of Science College
- Occupations: Teacher; writer; translator
- Known for: At the age of 10 she wrote the poem "Lamentos de uma Baiana", during the conflicts of Bahia's Independence
- Notable work: Lamentos de uma Baiana
- Spouse: Felisberto Gomes de Argollo Ferrão (m. 1827–1849)
- Parents: Euzébio Vanério (father); Samoa Angélica Vanério (mother)

Urânia Vanério de Argollo Ferrão (Salvador, 14 December 1811 — 3 December 1849) was a Brazilian teacher, writer and translator. In her childhood she witnessed the conflict between Brazilian and Portuguese troops in early 1822, in the context of the Bahia's independence process, which led her to write the poem "Lamentos de uma Baiana..." ("Laments of a girl from Bahia").

== Life ==
=== Childhood ===
Urânia Vanério was born in Salvador on December 14, 1811, the daughter of Portuguese educators Euzébio Vanério (Note: Euzébio was a deputy for Sergipe and a teacher at the Baía High School and responsible for introducing the Monitorial System in Brazil.) and Samoa Angélica Vanério, a family without possessions. Since childhood she was stimulated to study, coming to master the languages French, English and Italian, as well as other skills such as embroidery, drawing and music, that along with her physical beauty, impressed the ladies from the region.

==== Lamentos de uma Baiana ====
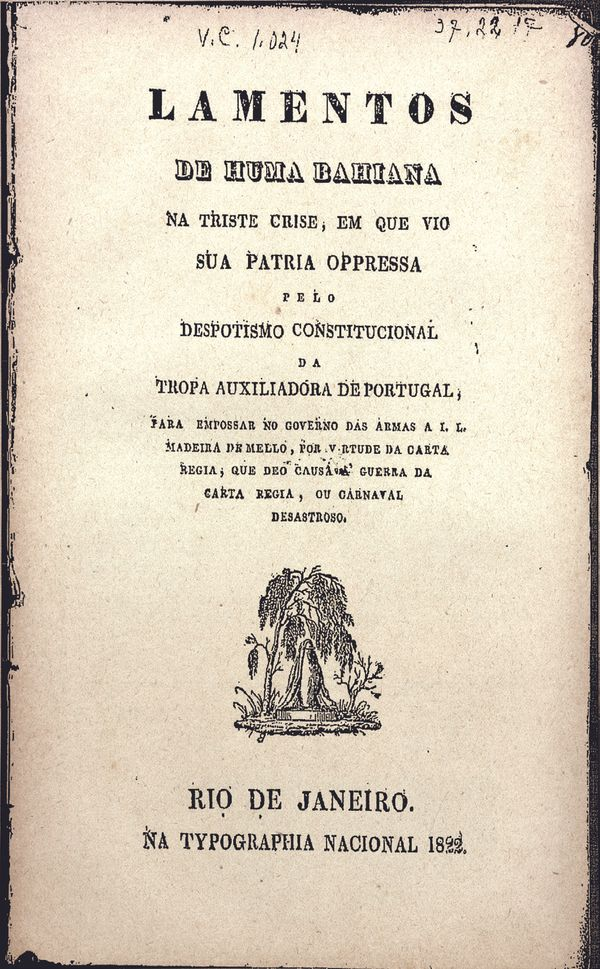
The pamphlet cover

"Lamentos de uma Baiana..." was a pamphlet written between February 19 and 21, 1822, when Urânia was only 10 years old, presenting her revolt against the government of Inácio Luís Madeira de Melo, loyal to Portugal and commander of the Portuguese Auxiliary Troop. The work was published in Rio de Janeiro, presenting the wrong age of Urânia, by Ângelo da Costa Ferreira and had its publication announced on October 21, 1822 by the Diário do Rio de Janeiro with the price of 80 réis. The authorship of the work was largely forgotten for two centuries; Brazilian historian Patrícia Valim has stated that this was due to the erasure of women's struggles from official history. (Note: Despite her young age when she produced the text, the white children of the time were encouraged from an early age to mature and be educated for marriage, something that the structure of society from the time expected to happen by the age of fifteen.)

In the text, she reveals her concern with the outcome of the war and the fate of her family, and refers to the murder of Sister Joana Angélica, who was killed by bayonet blows when Portuguese troops tried to invade the Lapa Convent. She also sought to reinforce her support for Brazil's Independence, as well as repudiate the conflicts caused by the "Royal Charter of July 8, 1820," which emancipated Sergipe. As she wrote, she was overcome with emotion was worried about the safety of her father, Portuguese, and to calm her down she said: "Your father will always be a Brazilian". (Note: Historian Patrícia Valim says that it is possible that her father closely observed the writing of the text.)

=== Youth ===
Months after the pamphlet was written, Urânia's family moved to the Recôncavo Baiano due to the fact that her father had joined the Interim Council of the Cachoeira city government.

In 1823 they moved to Sergipe, where the group her father belonged to clashed with that of Antônio Pereira Rebouças over political differences, a dispute that took place in the periodical "O Grito da Razão" ("The Scream of Reason"), which ended with his father being imprisoned in the Forte de São Pedro for alleged political disorder. With this, she returned to Salvador with her mother and the following year her mother returned to work at the "Desejo da Ciência para a educação da mocidade baianense" school ("Science's Wish for the Education of Bahia's Youth"), (Note: It was located in the current Barroquinha neighborhood. In 1847 it was described that the couple ran the "College of Ambi Dextros".) that she had founded with her husband, and where Urânia already worked at as a child. Upon leaving prison, Euzébio Vanério went back to work at the newspaper O Grito da Razão.

On April 21, 1825 Urânia requested from Emperor Dom Pedro I a license for the creation of a Mutual Teaching School for girls, which she received and was announced by the Diário Fluminense on April 28, 1825. (Note: Historian Patrícia Valim reports that the request and its presence in the media was an unusual event for a girl at the time.) With this, Urânia went back to work with her parents.

=== Adult life ===
On 1 March 1827, at 15, Urânia married Captain Felisberto Gomes de Argollo Ferrão (1802-1876), son of one of the wealthiest families in the province.

On December 11, 1827, the Diário do Rio de Janeiro announced the publication of the work "Triumpho do Patriotismo, Novela Americana", (Note: Full title: "Triunfo e o caráter de patriotismo" (Triumph and the character of patriotism). In the ad she is only called "D. Urânia Vanério", indicating that she continued to work with literature after her marriage and did not add her husband's surname to her output.) for 200 réis. The work, originally written by M. de Florian, had already been announced by the Diário Fluminense in 1826, explaining that it was a translation produced by Urânia Vanério, which may make her the first woman translator in Brazil, preceding Nísia Floresta by a decade.

Urânia Vanério and her husband continued living in Salvador, in the Barris neighborhood, (Note: An ad published in the "Correio Mercantil" on June 22, 1839 said that her husband was selling a house in the same neighborhood.) while she continued teaching at the school founded by her parents. In twenty-two years of marriage, Urânia had thirteen children, with two dying in infancy. (Note: You can read the names of some relatives in "Agradecimentos pela presença". O Monitor (in Portuguese). 1 (112): 3. 1876-10-17.)

== Death ==
On 3 December 1849 Urânia Vanério died of an infection from the birth of her last child, and was buried at the Church of the Holy House of Mercy, where members of distinguished families were buried. Her daughters became teachers in the same school where she worked, and her sons became businessmen and politicians of some local and national relevance. (Note: You can read the Necrology of one of her sons at "Capitão de Corveta Reformado Gomes de Argollo Ferrão". Revista Maritima Brasileira (in Portuguese). 100 (7). Rio de Janeiro: 905–907. January 1931.)

== Legacy ==
The authors of the collection "Guerra Literária" (2014) describe the pamphlet "Lamentos de uma Baiana" as the most "... outraged and painful protest against the action of General Madeira de Melo's troops, expressed in simple and direct language...", (Note: Original: "...revoltado e dolorido protesto contra a ação das tropas do General Madeira de Melo, vazado em linguagem simples e direta...") however, the author's name was not indicated.

Historian Patrícia Valim describes that the trajectory of Urânia Vanério has great importance for demonstrating the strategies that women of the time used in favor of their political engagement, for the fight against oppression, for justice and equality and that her pamphlet, which may have been originally made to defend her parents against possible attacks, "...gained body and became one of the most potent critiques against the arbitrary actions of the Portuguese absolutism in Bahia, the colonial exploitation and the violence of the imperial troops against the population of Salvador". (Note: Original: "...ganhou corpo e transformou-se em uma das mais potentes críticas contra os arbítrios do absolutismo português na Bahia, da exploração colonial e da violência das tropas imperiais contra a população de Salvador".)

=== Historical Rescue ===
The story of Urânia Vanério and the authorship of her pamphlet was rescued in the 21st century through historian Patrícia Valim's research, which led to the podcast described below and which resulted in a chapter written by the historian in the 2022 book "As mulheres que estavam lá" ("The Women Who Were There").

=== Popular culture ===
In the context of the Bicentennial of the Independence of Brazil, the story of Urânia Vanério was narrated by the scriptwriter Antonia Pellegrino in the podcast "Mulheres na Independência" (Women in Independence) and also had her history presented in the first episode of the series "1822 - Uma Conquista dos Brasileiros" (1822 - A Conquest of the Brazilians), produced by Fantástico.

== Works ==
- "Lamentos de huma bahiana na triste crise, em que vio sua patria oppressa pelo despotismo constitucional da tropa auxiliadora de Portugal, para empossar no governo das armas a I. L. Madeira de Mello, por virtude da carta regia, que deo causa á guerra da carta regia, ou carnaval desastroso". Rio de Janeiro, in Typographia Nacional, 1822, in- 4º de 8 pp. num.
  - En: "Laments of a girl from Bahia in the sad crisis, in which she saw her homeland oppressed by the constitutional despotism of the auxiliary troops of Portugal, to swear in the government of the arms to I. L. Madeira de Melo, by virtue of the royal charter, which caused the war of the royal charter, or disastrous carnival"
    - "Lamentos de uma Baiana". Guerra Literária (PDF) (in Portuguese). Vol. 4. UFMG. 2014. pp. 261–266. ISBN 978-65-5858-070-6. Archived (PDF) from the original on 2022-09-01.

== Bibliography ==
(Organized by date)

- "Obras Publicadas". Diario do Rio de Janeiro (in Portuguese). No. 18. 1822-10-21. p. 70.
- Carvalho, João Vieira de (1825-04-28). "Repartição dos Negocios da Guerra". Diário Fluminense (in Portuguese). Vol. 5, no. 93. p. 371.
- "Obras Publicadas". Diario do Rio de Janeiro (in Portuguese). No. 10. 1826-05-12. p. 37.
- "Declarações". Diario do Rio de Janeiro (in Portuguese). No. 16. 1826-07-19. p. 61.
- "Obras Publicadas". Diário do Rio de Janeiro. (in Portuguese). No. 8. 1827-12-11. p. 29.
- "Annuncios". Correio Mercantil. Vol. 6, no. 132. 1839-06-22. p. 4.
- "Annuncios". Correio Mercantil. (in Portuguese). Vol. 14, no. 8. 1847-01-13. p. 1.
- Barreto, F. M. (1850-01-16). "Necrologia". O Correio Sergipense (in Portuguese). Vol. 13, no. 5. p. 3.
- Cabral, Alfredo do Valle (1881). Annaes da Imprensa Nacional do Rio de Janeiro de 1808 a 1822 (PDF). Rio de Janeiro: Tipografia Nacional. p. 339. Archived from the original (PDF) on 2017-11-13.
- "Argollo Uma família brasileira de 1500". soveral.info. 2010.
- Carvalho; Bastos; Basile, eds. (2014). Guerra Literária (PDF) (in Portuguese). Vol. 4. UFMG. p. 801. ISBN 978-65-5858-070-6. Archived (PDF) from the original on 2022-09-01.
- Neves, Lucia Maria Bastos Pereira das (2020). "The Forgotten in the Independence Process: A History to be Made". Almanack (25). Translated by Celia Cristina Migliaccio. Guarulhos: 43. doi:10.1590/2236-463325ef00220. S2CID 226440291.
- Araújo, Gabriel (2022-08-03). "Luta de mulheres pela independência inspira podcast e livro". Folha de S. Paulo (in Brazilian Portuguese).
- Oliveira, Flávia (2022-08-05). "Passado e futuro em disputa". O Globo (in Brazilian Portuguese).
- Valim, Patrícia (2022-08-06). "Opinião - Patrícia Valim: Quem foi a menina de 10 anos que escreveu um dos principais panfletos pró-Independência". Folha de S. Paulo (in Brazilian Portuguese).
- "1822 - Uma Conquista dos Brasileiros: nova série mostra por que cidade na Bahia já festejou bicentenário da Independência". Globo (in Brazilian Portuguese). 2022-08-14.
- Valim, Patrícia (2022). "Lamentos e Lutas de Urânia Vanério na Independência do Brasil". Independência do Brasil: As mulheres que estavam lá (in Brazilian Portuguese) (1 ed.). Bazar do Tempo. pp. 70–85. ISBN 9786584515093.
- "A história de Urânia Vanério é narrada no quarto episódio do podcast 'Mulheres na Independência'". psychic-live.club (in Brazilian Portuguese). 2022-08-25.
- Peixoto, Mariana (2022-09-03). "Livro 'As mulheres que estavam lá' destaca força feminina na Independência". Estado de Minas (in Brazilian Portuguese).
