= 1849 in Brazil =

Events in the year 1849 in Brazil.

== Incumbents ==
- Monarch: Pedro II
- Prime Minister:
  - Viscount of Olinda (until 8 October)
  - Marquis of Monte Alegre (starting 8 October)

== Births ==
- 5 November - Ruy Barbosa

== Deaths ==
- 3 December - Urânia Vanério
