= Manuel Cardoso =

Manuel Cardoso may refer to:

- Manuel Cardoso (composer)
- Manuel Cardoso (cyclist)
- Manuel Cardoso (gymnast)

== See also ==
- Manuel Cardoso de Saldanha, Portuguese architect and military engineer
