= José António Caldas =

José António Caldas (1725 – 31 October 1782) was a military engineer from the then Portuguese colony of Brazil. He was a pioneer of the use of the camera obscura in Brazil. He was a Knight Professor of the Order of Christ.

== Biography ==
His location of birth is not known. He lived his childhood in the city of Salvador da Bahia until he was seated as an infantryman in 1745. He formed a head squadron of the Fortification Class of Bahía.

He later went to Lisbon, where he permanently stayed for over a year and returned to work with one of his maters, professor Manuel Cardoso de Saldanha. Working conducted some surveys, having designed several plants, one of its examples was a road to the saltpeter mines of Montes Altos.

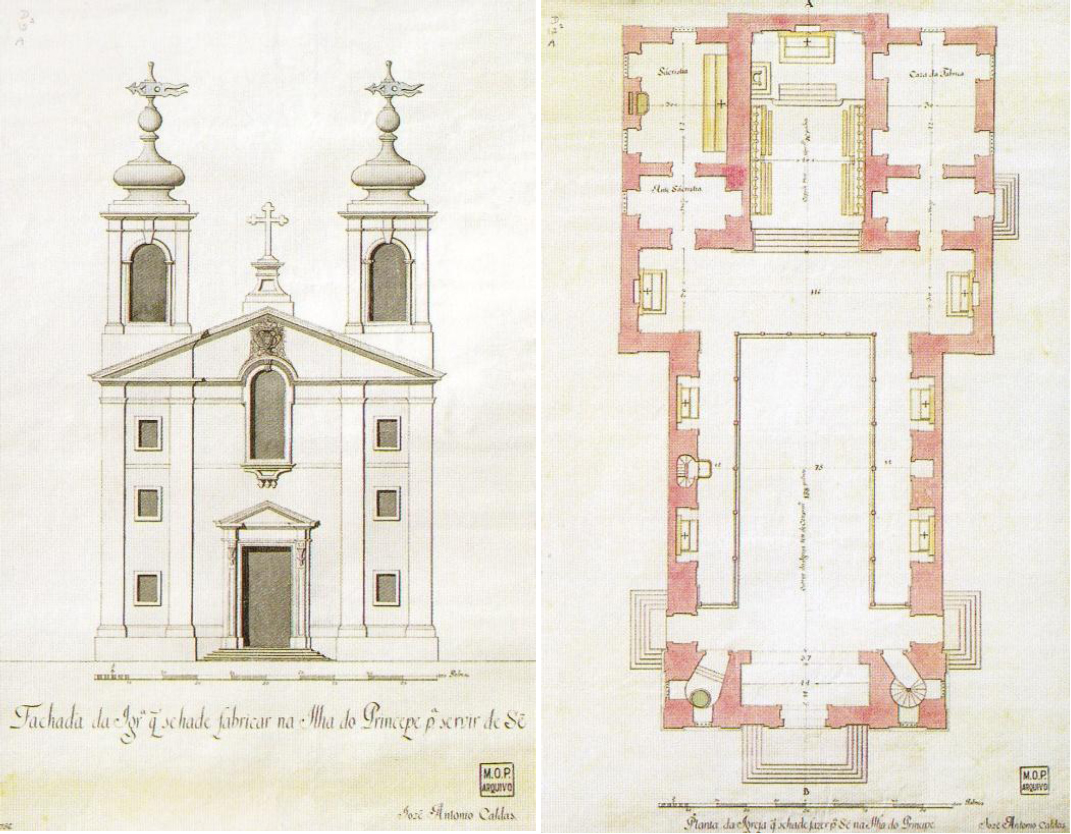
Project on a facade and plan of the Cathedral of São Tomé and Príncipe, made by José António Caldas c. 1757 (AHU)

By the appointment of Saldanha, he was contracted by the Portuguese Crown for the work on its forfications in the archipelago of São Tomé e Príncipe in 1757. Thanks to his performance on his commission, he received a patent by the captain in 1761.

He was also wronged for not receiving a solicitated promotion for promoting as Tenant-Colonel, even though at the time, he was the oldest Sergeant-Major.

== Works ==
Of his works as a military engineer, he was author of significant projects in Salvador. He designed a monumental plan of the city of Salvador in 1779 and traced different urbanization projects for the city, one of it was Ribeira das Naus and another in an area once dominated by trapiches in Cidade Baixa (Lower City). One of his most important work, for his exactness was the projected of the old Jesuit College (Colégio dos Jesuítas), the Terreiro de Jesus, whose originals is deposited at the Historical Army Archives of Rio de Janeiro. He also made a drawing on a apocryphal document, which was attributed in virtue with the allusions of other documents and characteristics of legendary calligraphy.

He also built the Seminário de Belém (Belém Seminary) in Pará.

He also made different public works, between which was an "Expedition in Maranhão" ("Expedição do Maranhã") made in 1763, where he drew on the use of the darkrooms and "Notícia Geral de Toda esta Capitania da Bahia Desde o Seu Descobrimento Até o Presente Ano de 1759" ["General News From All the Captaincy of Bahia From Its Discovery Up To The Present Year of 1759"] (1760).

He was also a mediator at the Chamber of Senate and president of the Council of War.
