= Gravatá Fountain =

18th century fountain in Brazil

- Fonte do Gravatá
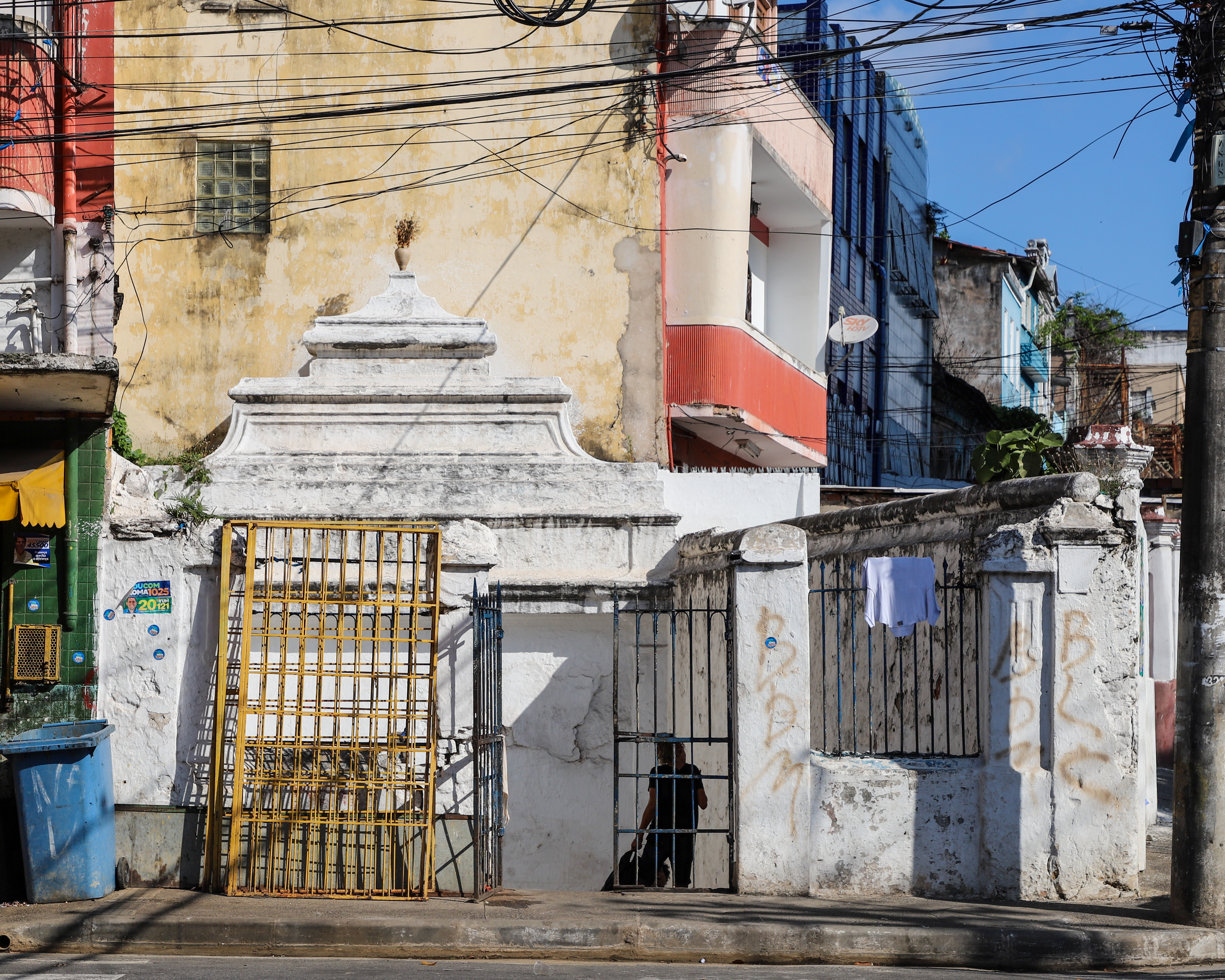
- Gravatá Fountain, Salvador, Bahia, Brazil

- Location within Brazil

General information
- Location: Rua Fonte do Gravatá, Salvador, Bahia, Brazil
- Coordinates: 12.977216°S 38.509347°W
- Estimated completion: 1700s

The Gravatá Fountain (Portuguese: Fonte do Gravatá) is an abandoned fountain in Salvador, Bahia, Brazil. It dates to the 18th century and functioned as a public fountain. It is located a short distance west of the Church of the Blessed Sacrament of Saint Anne (Portuguese: Igreja do Santíssimo Sacramento e Sant'Ana), also completed in the 18th century. The building is protected as a historic structure by the state of Bahia.

== History ==
The Gravatá Fountain dates to the early 18th century. The Senate of the Chamber of Salvador expropriated land belonging to Sergeant Major José Batista de Carvalho in 1724 to build a road to connect the fountain to the historic center of Salvador; the road remains as the Rua do Gravatá. It once supplied water to the neighborhoods of Mouraria, Palma, and Santana.

Luís dos Santos Vilhena commented in 1801:

Inside the city, just below the Church and Parish of Santa Ana, is the Fonte do Gravatá, the most filthy and worst of all; it is, however, the most frequented because it is the only public [fountain] within the city.

The Santa Casa da Misericordia of Salvador claimed ownership of the fountain and its surrounding property in 1846; it lost the case in a court heard by municipal authorities. The city mandated an inspection and repair of all fountains in Salvador after a drought from 1883 to 1885; a reference to the Gravatá Fountain appears in the report.

Water testing was performed in the fountain in 2015 and it was found to be crystalline, with a moderate, continuous flow.

== Location ==
The Gravatá Fountain is located at the intersection of Rua do Gravata and Rua da Fonte do Gravata, a small street that leads up to the Church of the Blessed Sacrament of Saint Anne. It is located below the second line of hills beyond the historic center of Salvador. The fountain, once located on a hillside, is located below the street level and is accessible by stairs. It is now surrounded by numerous homes of the 19th century.

== Structure ==
The Gravatá Fountain has a rectangular plan with a vault, crowned by a simple pediment. It is constructed of stone masonry. Similar to other fountains in Bahia, it is surrounded by an iron fence with a gate. It had two functioning spouts as late as the 1970s, similar to those reported by Luís dos Santos Vilhena in 1801. The catchment basin is shallow and slightly below the street level; the fountain has a decantation tank to regulate water flow.

== Protected status ==
The Gravatá Fountain is a protected structure by the Bahian Institute of Artistic Culture and Heritage (Instituto do Patrimônio Artístico e Cultural da Bahia) under Decree no. 001/84 of 1984.

== Access ==
The Gravatá Fountain is located on the corner of Rua do Gravata and Rua da Fonte do Gravata in a busy commercial district. The fountain is in an advanced state of filth and disrepair.
