= Chapel of Our Lady of the Snows (Ilha de Maré) =

16th-century church in Bahia, Brazil

- Capela de Nossa Senhora das Neves
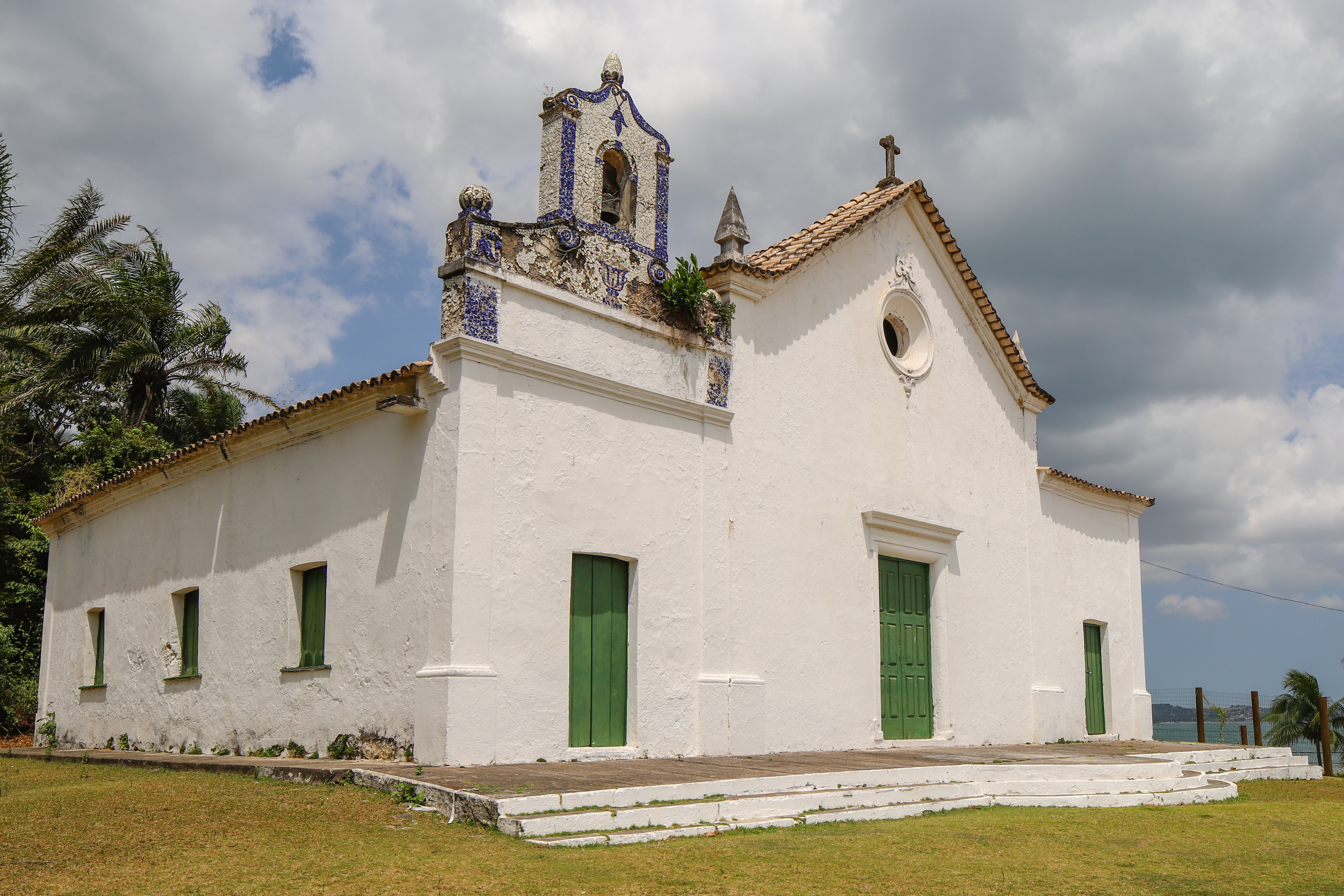
- Chapel of Our Lady of the Snows

- Location of the Chapel of Our Lady of the Snows in Brazil

Religion
- Affiliation: Catholic
- Diocese: Ilha de Maré
- Rite: Roman
- Ownership: Roman Catholic Archdiocese of São Salvador da Bahia

Location
- Municipality: Salvador
- State: Bahia
- Country: Brazil
- Interactive map of Chapel of Our Lady of the Snows
- Coordinates: 12.793407°S 38.519938°W

Architecture
- Style: Baroque
- Established: 1552
- Direction of façade: South-west

National Historic Heritage of Brazil
- Designated: 1958
- Reference no.: 574

The Chapel of Our Lady of the Snows (Portuguese: Capela de Nossa Senhora das Neves) is a 16th-century Roman Catholic church located on the Ilha de Maré in the Bay of All Saints, Bahia, Brazil. The island is administratively part of the city of Salvador. The chapel is dedicated to Blessed Virgin Mary and belongs to the Roman Catholic Archdiocese of São Salvador da Bahia. Its construction is dated to 1552, and is among the oldest existing churches in Brazil. It was part of the sugar plantation of André Fernandes Margalho. The nave of the church is narrow, measuring only 6 metres (20 ft) by 15 metres (49 ft). The church was listed as a historic structure by the National Historic and Artistic Heritage Institute in 1958. The historian Mário Mendonça de Oliveira calls it "one of the gems of old Brazilian religious architecture".

== History ==
Reference to the Chapel of Our Lady of the Snows appears in a report by Gabriel Soares, who wrote in 1587 about "a new church of Our Lady of the Snows, with a fine finish, as part of the sugar plantation belonging to André Fernandes Margalho."^{A} Its construction predates that of the Jesuit College in Salvador, built between 1561 and 1585.

== Protected status ==
The Chapel of Our Lady of the Snows was listed as a historic structure by the National Institute of Historic and Artistic Heritage in 1958. Both the structure and its contents were included in the IPHAN directive under inscription number 574.

== Access ==
The Chapel of Our Lady of the Snows is open to the public and may be visited.

== Footnote ==
A.In Portuguese: uma fresca igreja de Nossa Senhora das Neves muito bem acabada, o qual engenho é de André Fernandes Margalho.

== See also ==
- List of Catholic churches in Salvador, Bahia
