= Chapel of Saint Lazarus =

Roman Catholic church in Bahia, Brazil

- Capela de São Lázaro
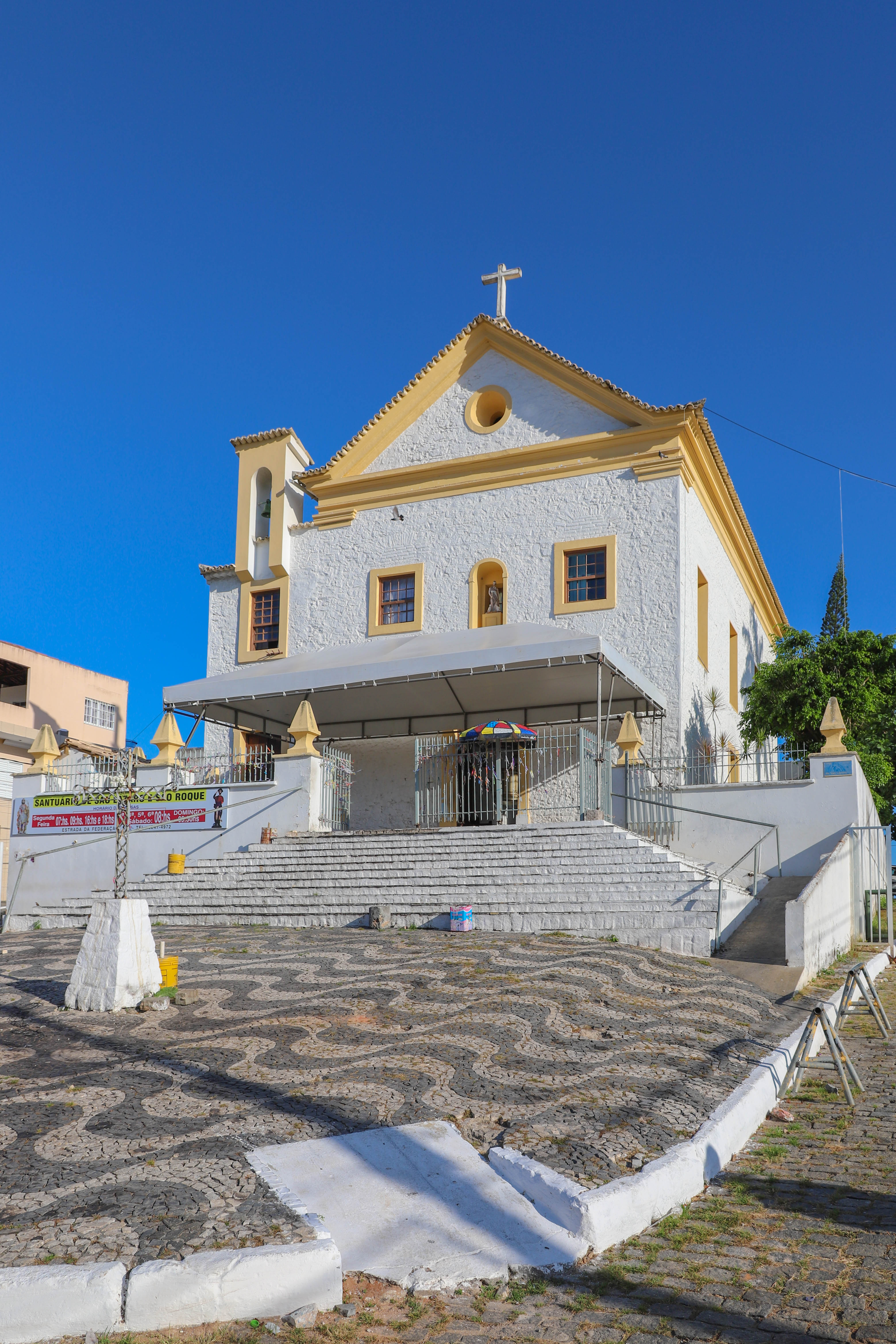
- Chapel of Saint Lazarus, Salvador, Bahia

- Location of the Chapel of Saint Lazarus in Brazil

Religion
- Affiliation: Catholic
- Diocese: Federação
- Rite: Roman
- Ownership: Roman Catholic Archdiocese of São Salvador da Bahia

Location
- Municipality: Salvador
- State: Bahia
- Country: Brazil
- Interactive map of Chapel of Saint Lazarus
- Coordinates: 13.007907°S 38.511881°W

Architecture
- Style: Baroque
- Established: 1700s
- Direction of façade: North

The Chapel of Saint Lazarus (Portuguese: Capela de São Lázaro, also Igreja de São Lázaro e São Roque) is an 18th-century Roman Catholic church located in Salvador, Bahia, Brazil. The chapel is dedicated to Saint Lazarus and Saint Roch. The chapel was established as a hermitage to treat people with leprosy; it was later used as a quarantine station for enslaved people arriving from Africa. Worship at the chapel is syncretic in character, with its two annual festivals combining Roman Catholic and Candomblé elements. The chapel is located on a hill high in the Federação neighborhood and consists of a single nave, altar, gallery, and sacristy. It is listed as a historic structure by the Instituto do Património Artístico e Cultural da Bahia.

== History ==
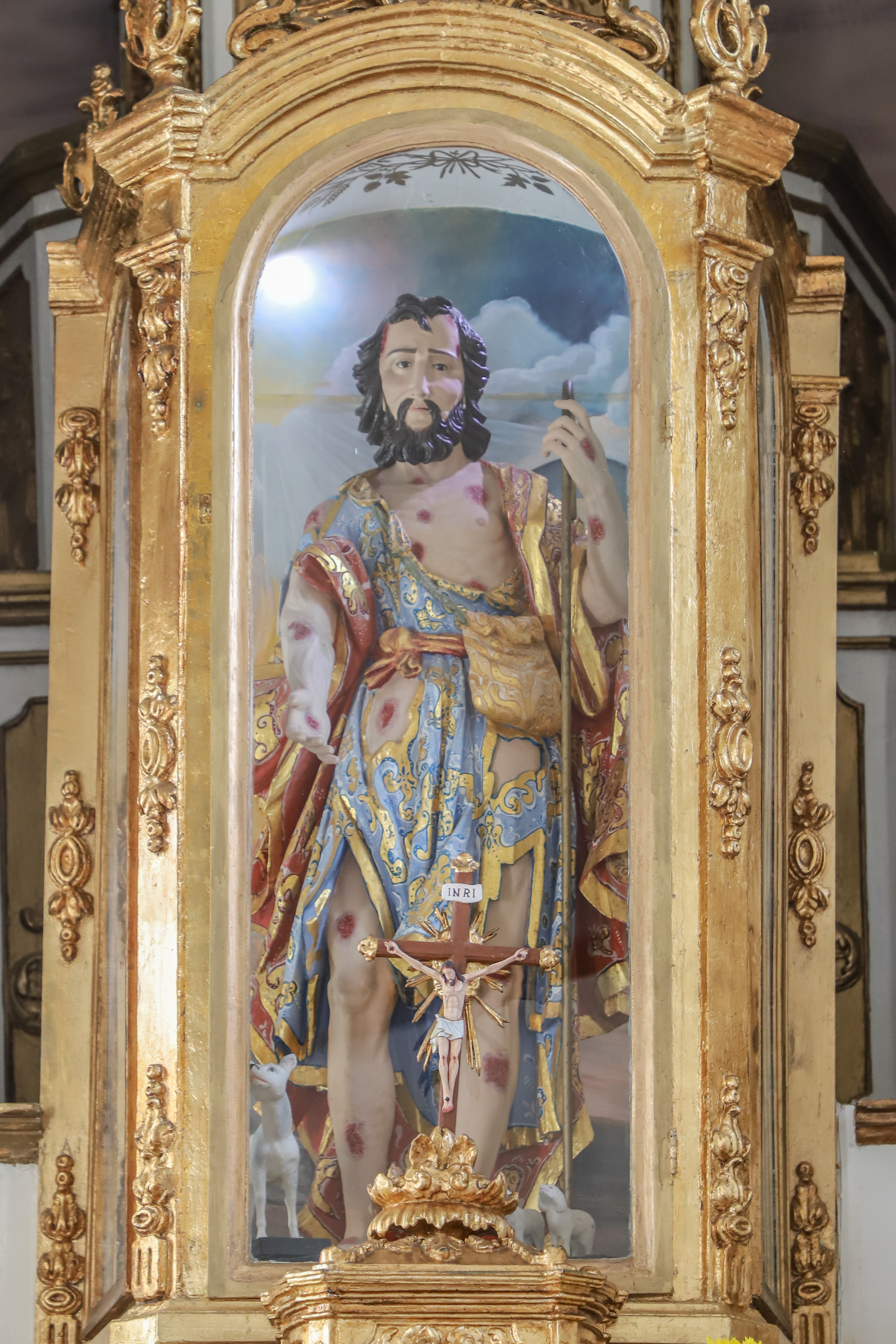
Image of Saint Lazarus, high altar of the Chapel of Saint Lazarus

A deed dated October 12, 1734, lists the chapel as the property of Jorge Fernandes da Rocha and his wife Francisca Xavier, dedicated to Saint Lazarus. A royal decree of 1755 states that "long ago some devotees founded a charity, hermitage to St. Lazarus." Rodrigo José António de Meneses (1750-1807), governor of Minas Gerais and Bahia, granted permission to build a small hospital next to the chapel on March 27, 1762. The hospital was used as a quarantine station for enslaved people arriving from Africa.

Ownership of the hospital was transferred to the Quinta do Tanque, a former Jesuit hospital, on August 27, 1787; it now belongs to the Federal University of Bahia.

== Location ==
The Chapel of Saint Lazarus is located on a high point in the Federação neighborhood on a hill known as Colina de São Lázaro (English: Saint Lazarus Hill). It has a view of the Atlantic Ocean and the entrance to the Bay of All Saints. The chapel once sat in a rural area, but is now surrounded by urban sprawl.

== Structure ==
The Chapel of Saint Lazarus consists of a single nave with an asymmetrical floor plan. A single gallery was added to the nave after the construction of the nave. The chapel has a small sacristy that opens to the chancel; it has a high altar, chancel arch, and two lateral altars. A single, simple bell gable was added to the left of the façade. The chapel has a simple, triangular pediment with an oculus, a feature of Jesuit churches of the early colonial period in Brazil. The chapel has a single stone portal which opens to a stone forecourt surrounded by stairs. Two windows are located at the choir level.

== Festivals ==
=== Festa de São Lázaro ===
The Festival of Saint Lazarus (Festa de São Lázaro) is celebrated on the last Sunday of January. An image of Saint Lazarus is processed through the neighborhood after a mass. Candomblé adapts was the staircase and forecourt of the chapel and light candles in honor of the orixá Babalú-Ayé, or Omolu. Members of the community are then blessed by showers of popcorn by Candomblé priestesses.

=== Festival of Saint Roch and Obaluaê ===
The Festival of Saint Roch and Obaluaê (Festa de São Roque e Obaluaê) takes place on August 16. The image of Saint Roch, the secondary saint of the chapel, is processed through the neighborhood after a mass from the chapel to the Campo Santo Cemetery. Both the Saint Roch and the Candomblé orixá Obaluaê, or "old Omolu", are protectors from infectious diseases.

== Protected status ==
The Chapel of Saint Lazarus is listed as a historic structure by the Instituto do Património Artístico e Cultural da Bahia.

== Access ==
The Chapel of Saint Lazarus is open to the public and may be visited.
