= Church of Our Lady of Health and Glory =

Roman Catholic church in Bahia, Brazil

- Igreja de Nossa Senhora da Saúde e Glória
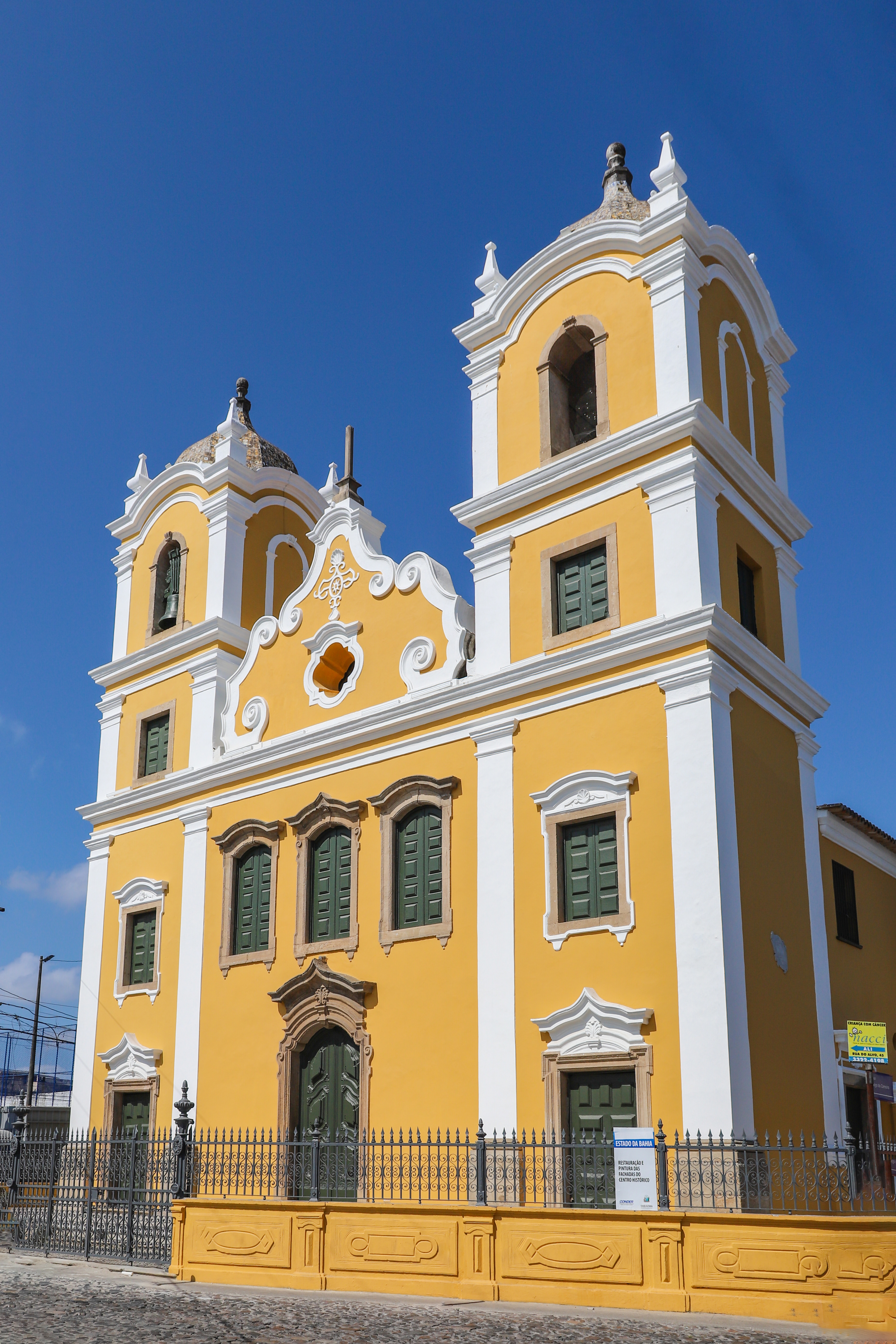
- Church of Our Lady of Health and Glory, Salvador, Bahia

- Location of the Church of Our Lady of Health and Glory in Brazil

Religion
- Affiliation: Catholic
- Rite: Roman
- Ownership: Roman Catholic Archdiocese of São Salvador da Bahia

Location
- Municipality: Salvador
- State: Bahia
- Country: Brazil
- Interactive map of Church of Our Lady of Health and Glory
- Coordinates: 12.972511°S 38.505855°W

Architecture
- Style: Baroque
- Founder: Manuel Ramos Parente
- Established: 1726
- Direction of façade: West

National Historic Heritage of Brazil
- Designated: 1941
- Reference no.: 274

The Church of Our Lady of Health and Glory (Portuguese: Igreja de Nossa Senhora da Saúde, or more fully Portuguese: Igreja de Nossa Senhora da Saúde e Glória) is an 18th-century Roman Catholic church located in Salvador, Bahia, Brazil. The church is dedicated to Our Lady of Health. It was constructed by Manuel Ramos Parente and his wife Maria de Almeida Reis on the second line of hills below the Historic Center of Salvador in the 18th century. The first mass was celebrated in 1726, the same year that Parente died. The church is noted for the painting on the ceiling of the nave by Domingos da Costa Filgueira (?–1797), the first in Bahia. The interior of the church was slowly completed into the 19th century; it now has neoclassical interior elements and an elaborate Baroque and rococo façade. Its two towers have elaborately tiled tops.

== History ==
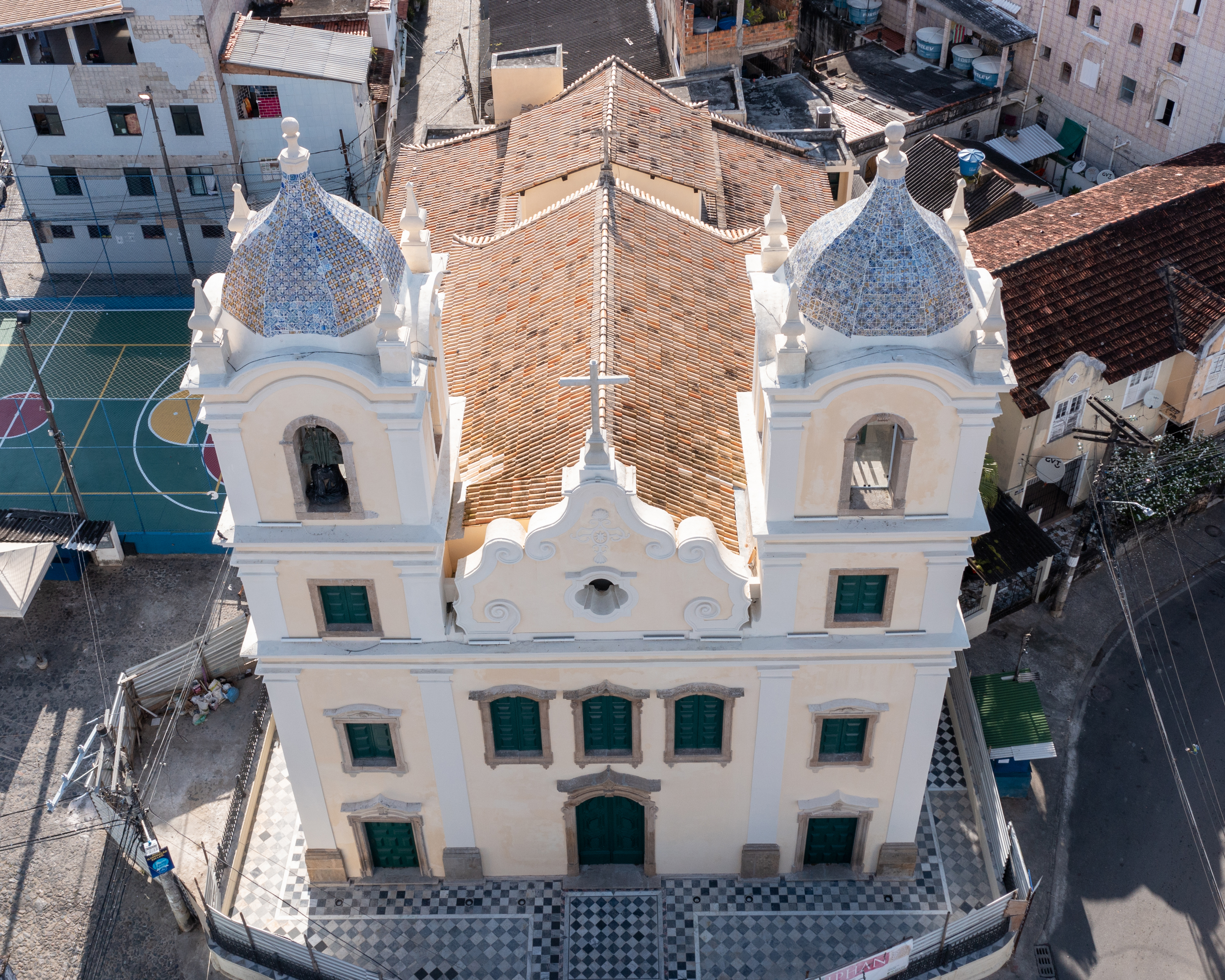
Aerial view of the Church of Our Lady of Health and Glory

The Church of Our Lady of Health and Glory was constructed on land owned by Lieutenant-Colonel Manuel Ramos Parente on farmland known as Alvo. Construction of the church was funded by Parente and his wife, Maria de Almeida Reis. It was built in gratitude for the end of the Great Plague of Marseilles in 1720, the last major outbreak of bubonic plague in Western Europe. The cornerstone of the church was placed on February 2, 1723 by Vasco Fernandes Cesar de Menezes, the 4th Viceroy of Brazil. An image of Our Lady of Health was installed in the church in the following year after a long procession followed by a festival. The chancel, vestry, and tribunes were completed in 1726; the first mass was celebrated in the church in the same year. Manuel Ramos Parente died in 1726 and his widow, Maria de Almeida Reis, completed the construction of the church.

Antônio Roiz Mendes, a master carver, completed the altarpiece of the main chapel between 1769 and 1770. Domingos da Costa Filgueira was commissioned to complete ceiling paintings in the nave, vestry, and below the choir in the same year. The carvings were renovated and replaced by Francisco Hermógenes de Figueiredo between 1814 and 1827. The provenance of images in the church is difficult to determine, but the master sculptor Felix Pereira Guimarães was commissioned to complete some works according to records of February 1791.

Marble floor covering of the nave, sacristy, and aisles was installed by 1844. Attendance at the church declined by 1841; mass was suspended in 1887 for further renovations to the structure. J. Rabut restored the ceiling of the nave in 1887, but significantly altered the artwork. Marble tiles were installed in the churchyard, and railing and an iron gate were installed. These works were completed in 1889 and the church reopened to worship.

IPHAN evaluated the structure between 1942 and 1949. The roof partially collapsed in 1951; emergency measures were taken in the same year to stabilize the structure. The church closed again in 1959 for further works. The interior walls of the nave, window frames, and high altar were restored. The church was painted in 1965 without authorization by IPHAN. A slab was placed in the back of the church. The church closed again in 1998, suffered roof damage in 2012, and reopened in 2021 after a long period of renovation. The exterior, which was painted a deep yellow, was restored to light-yellow.

== Location ==
The Church of Our Lady of Health and Glory is located in the second line of hills east of the Historic Center of Salvador. The church sits on the convergence of five streets and opens onto a wide public square. The square, Praça Severino Ribeiro, is surrounded by Portuguese colonial-period sobrados constructed in the 19th century.

== Structure ==
The Church of Our Lady of Health and Glory was constructed of stone and brick masonry with marble flooring. The façade has been modified over time. Its current form dates to the 19th century and resembles that of the Church of Our Lady of Penha to the north of Salvador, which was constructed in the same period. It has a central body flanked by two towers; the three vertical sections of the façade are divided by pilasters. A single central stone portal opens to the nave and has three windows above at the choir level. The façade has a rococo-style pediment that dates to the late 19th century. Each of the bell towers has a door opening to the lateral corridors. The bell towers have pear-shaped tops tiled in ceramic fragments "supported on arched cornices", similar to those of the Church of the Blessed Sacrament at Rua do Passo. The churchyard is semi-circular with iron railings dating to 1887.

=== Interior ===
The church has a single nave with lateral corridors and tribunes, a design typical of the early 18th century. The consistory and sacristy sit on either side of the chancel. A massive wooden barrel vault ceiling covers the nave and choir. Carvings on the altar, the cross arch, tribunes, choir screen, and pulpits were completed between 1769 and 1770 by Domingos da Costa Filgueira; they were replaced in 1814 by neoclassical design elements. The left side altar has an image of Saint Anthony of Padua; the altar on the right has an image of the Sacred Heart of Jesus. The high altar has an image of Our Lady of Health below the Crucifix below an elaborate baldachin.

Ceilings with elaborated painting were introduced to Brazil in the first half of the 18th century; they were inspired by the Church of St. Ignatius of Rome, painted in 1694 by Andrea Pozzo. The ceiling painting of the nave of the Church of Our Lady of Health and Glory is the work of the Bahian painter Domingos da Costa Filgueira (died 1797); it is in the Baroque trompe-l'œil style and was completed in 1769. It is one of the first ceiling paintings of its type in Bahia. The painting has, at its center, a large image of the Assumption of the Virgin Mary; the remainder of the ceiling is painted with angels, flowers, arches, and columns.

Azulejo tiles line the lower parts of the chancel and nave; they were imported from Lisbon between 1780 and 1790. They depict the Four Evangelists, Most Sacred Heart of Jesus, and Our Lady of Sorrows.

The sacristy is located to the right (south) of the chancel. It had a wood ceiling with a perspective painting executed by Domingos da Costa Gilgueira in 1769; it is now lost. The ceiling now has a work completed by the engraver João Nunes Pereira in 1845. Its quality is listed as "mediocre" by the historian Marieta Alves.

== In television ==
Scenes from the miniseries Dona Flor e Seus Dois Maridos, inspired by the film Dona Flor and Her Two Husbands, were filmed at the church in 1998.

== Protected status ==
The Church of Our Lady of Health and Glory was listed as a historic structure by the National Institute of Historic and Artistic Heritage in 1941.

== Access ==
The church is open to the public and may be visited.
