= Church and Convent of Our Lady of the Conception of Lapa =

Roman Catholic church in Salvador, Bahia, Brazil

- Igreja e Convento de Nossa Senhora da Conceição da Lapa
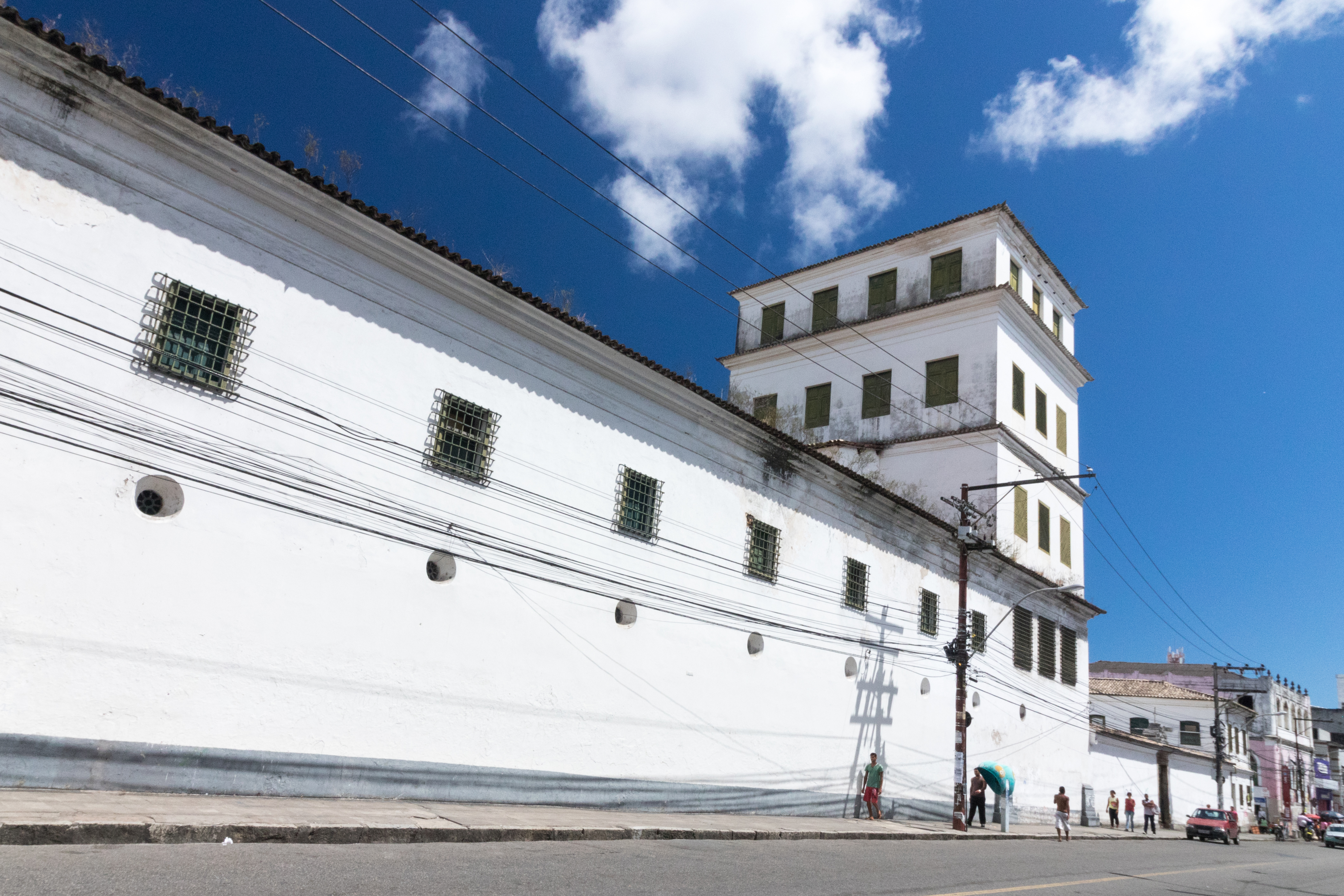
- Church and Convent of Our Lady of the Conception of Lapa

- Location of the Church and Convent of Our Lady of the Conception of Lapa in Brazil

Religion
- Affiliation: Catholic
- Rite: Roman
- Ownership: Roman Catholic Archdiocese of São Salvador da Bahia
- Patron: Our Lady of the Conception

Location
- Municipality: Salvador
- State: Bahia
- Country: Brazil
- Coordinates: 12.981236°S 38.512302°W

Architecture
- Groundbreaking: 1734
- Completed: 1744

National Historic Heritage of Brazil
- Designated: 1938

The Church and Convent of Our Lady of the Conception of Lapa (Portuguese: Igreja e Convento de Nossa Senhora da Conceição da Lapa) is an 18th-century Roman Catholic church located in Salvador, Bahia, Brazil. The church is dedicated to Our Lady of the Conception and is part of the Roman Catholic Archdiocese of São Salvador da Bahia. It is known as key site in the Brazilian independence movement in the early 19th century. Sister Joana Angélica resisted the invasion of Portuguese troops into the convent and was killed by bayonet in 1822 at the south portal of the convent.

The interior of the church is noted as "one of the finest rococo compositions in the city". Its original baroque construction of the 18th century remains largely unaltered, with a complex high altar, azulejos in the chancel, and a well-preserved nave ceiling painting. The Church and Convent of Our Lady of the Conception of Lapa was listed as a historic structure by the National Historic and Artistic Heritage Institute (IPHAN) in 1938.

== Location ==
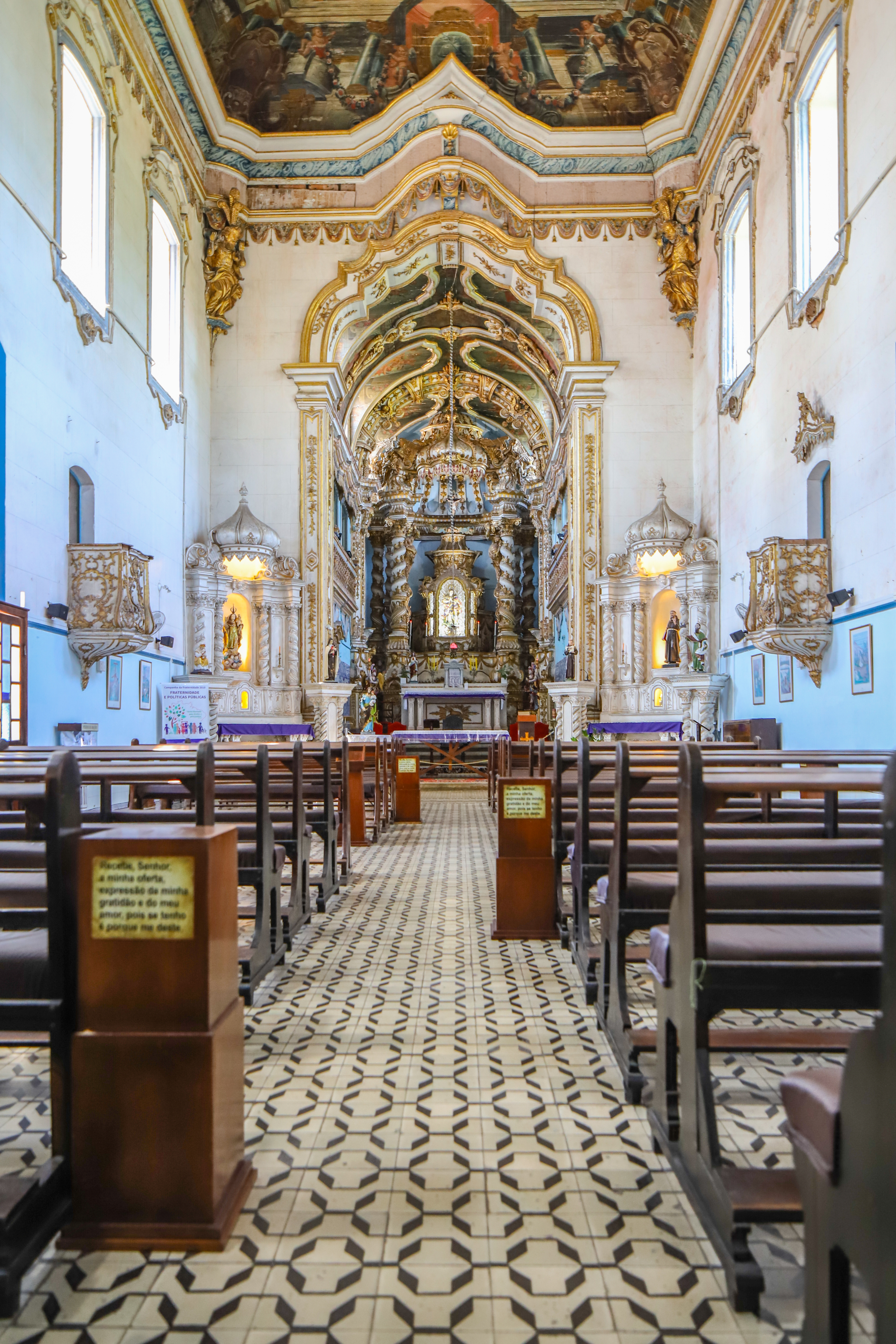
Nave and chancel of the Church of Lapa

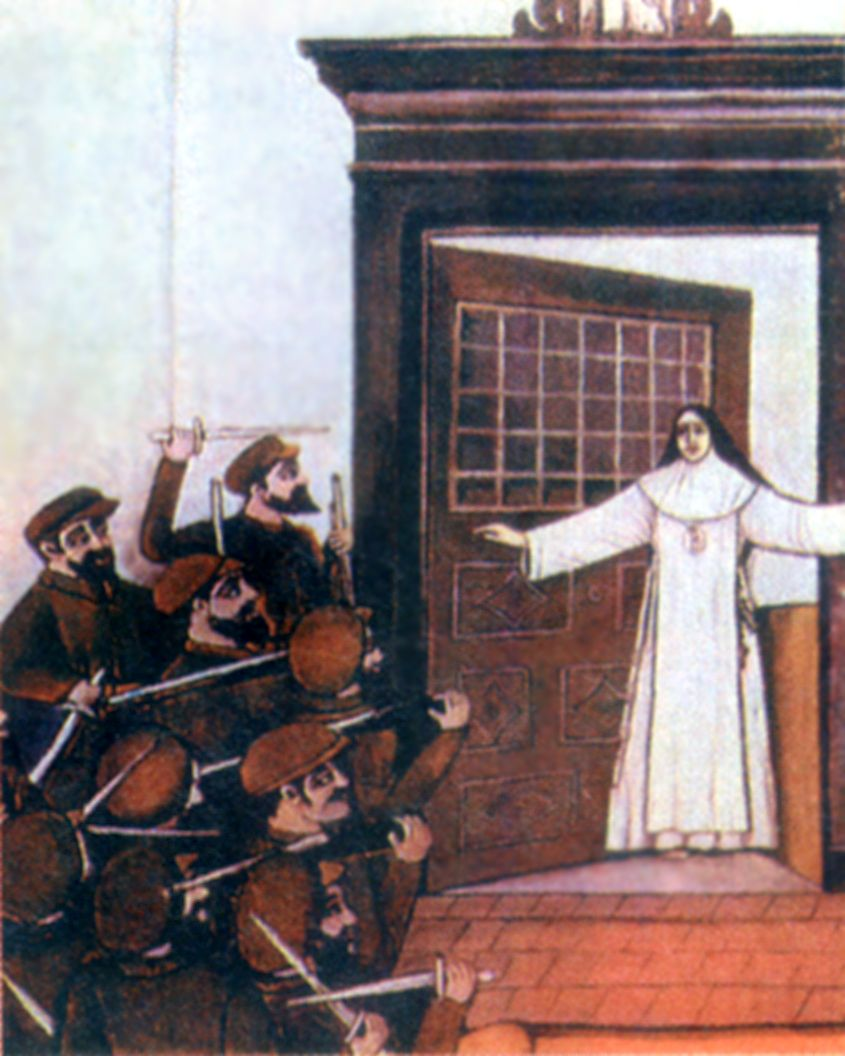
Martyrdom of Joana Angélica, 1822

The Church and Convent of Our Lady of the Conception of Lapa is located directly south of the Historic Center of Salvador. It was constructed on the second line of hills beyond the historic city center. While once surrounded by open agricultural land, it now stretches several city blocks along Avenida Joana Angélica, a long commercial street in the Lapa neighborhood of the city. The church and convent have a broad, two-story white lime wall facing the avenue with two ornate portals. The north portal provides entrance to the east of the church nave, which sits parallel to the avenue.

== History ==
The first convent in Salvador was established in 1665, the Convent of Desterro, but proved to be too small by the early 18th century. Manuel Antunes Lima and João de Miranda Ribeiro, wealthy merchants in Salvador, sought authorization from John V of Portugal to build a convent to cloister their daughters. João de Miranda Ribeiro, originally from Porto, was admitted to the Santa Casa da Misericórdia of Salvador in 1717, a charitable fraternity, as a "minor" member due to his status as a carpenter. He became greatly wealthy over the next three decades; his son, Agostoinho de Miranda Ribeiro, was admitted to the Misericórdia fraternity as a "major" member due to their elevated family status. Similarly, Manuel Antunes Lima was also a member of the Misericórdia fraternity, and promoted from a minor member to a "major" member of the upper class in 1732.

Lima and Ribeiro sent a letter dated October 13, 1733 to request permission to build the convent; it was granted via a royal decree dated October 13, 1733. John V stipulated that the Lima and Ribeiro cover the entire cost of the construction of the convent, and limit its community to twenty individuals. Construction on the convent of Lapa began in 1734 on landed ceded to Ribeiro by Captain João Pinto Brandão de Magalhães. João de Miranda Ribeiro, as a master carpenter, had previous experience building a chapel; he constructed a building of stone and lime at his residence in Tororó. It was dedicated to Our Lady of Conception of the Grotto.

The convent was dedicated on December 7, 1744 under archbishop Dom José Botelho de Matos. 17 postulates entered the convent. Leadership of the new convent came from Convent of Desterro: Mother Maria Caetana da Assunção was installed as Abbess of the Lapa Convent, and Mother Josefa Clara de Jesus became Vicar of the new community. Five novitiates were daughters of João de Miranda Ribeiro: Sisters Francisca do Sacramento da Lapa, Joana do Nascimento da Lapa, Maria da Cruz da Lapa, Ursula das Virgens da Lapa.

The Lapa convent, like the Convent of Desterro, was reserved for daughters of the wealthy merchant class, almost all with fortunes from sugarcane plantations. The Convent of Desterro had 400 enslaved Africans in the 18th century; the convent of Lapa was "renowned for their prominent families, their jewels and finery, their multitudinous personal servants, and their scandalous morality."

The Lapa community grew to 20 members as stipulated by the degree, then was allowed to grow to 33 members. The chapel of the convent became too small to accommodate the growing community. João Miranda Ribeiro asked John V to build a church adjacent to the convent; a small military fortification, however, was located on the site. Construction was only authorized in 1750. The church was designed by Lieutenant-General Nicolau de Abreu Carvalho and his eldest son João de Abreu e Carvalho in 1752. The plan of the church is located in the Arquivo Histórico Ultramarino, an archive of Portuguese colonial history in Lisbon.

Construction of the church began on June 8, 1750. Sergeant-Major Manuel Cardoso de Saldanha declared the small military fortification ruined and useless in a letter dated June 10, 1752, which allowed construction to begin on the site. Progress on the project was slow and further delayed by the death of João de Miranda Ribeiro in October 1755. João Francisco Passarinho served as the master carpenter of the project. João Francisco Passarinho, unlike Ribeiro, was paid daily, which greatly increased the cost of construction costs. José Moreira Leal arrived in Bahia from Lisbon in 1754 with a portal sculpted of lioz stone to donate to the convent, but it lacked two stones for its base; they arrived in a shipment in the following year. An image of Our Lady of the Conception and window panes also date to Leal's donation. The Conceptionists also petitioned for a choir accessible only to the convent community; as a result, the church has a two-tiered choir.

Antônio Mendes da Silva, a woodcarver, designed and executed the high altar. His work began on June 8, 1755, but not completed until 1763; the Lapa convent, like other religious structures in Salvador, often lacked donations or wealthy patrons. The larger niche has the image of Our Lady of the Conception; an image of the Good Shepherd is located above. Both statues date to the 18th century.

The stone wall dates to 1767. It was constructed by permission from the Chamber Senate of Salvador after the church and convent were straightened to conform to the street.

=== Death of Joana Angélica ===
The Church and Convent of Our Lady of the Conception of Lapa is the site of a key event in the struggle for the independence of Brazil from the Portuguese in the early 19th century. Joana Angélica, a Brazilian Conceptionist nun and abbess of the Lapa convent, resisted an invasion into the convent by Portuguese troops in 1822. The Portuguese stabbed Joana Angélica a bayonet, and she promptly died and became the first heroine of the independence struggle of Brazil.

The convent fell into financial crisis after the death of Joana Angélica. Her successor, Mother Joana de Jesus Maria Rabelo, requested and received permission to sell gold and silver implements dating to the previous century; the included a silver crowns, a large gold vessel, large silver torches, and other valuable objects.

=== 20th century ===
Only three Conceptcionist nuns and some servants remained in the convent at the beginning of the 20th century. Maria José da Conceição Barata, abbess of the convent, received members of the Congregation of Our Lady of Charity of the Good Shepherd on July 16, 1901. The Congregation arrived in Bahia in 1892 and lived among various Catholic institutions in the city. With the death of the final Conceptionist sister in 1912, ownership of the Lapa Convent passed to the Good Shepherd religious community.

== Structure ==
The Church and Convent of Our Lady of the Conception of Lapa consists of a long complex with a church to the north and convent and school to the south. It is surrounded by a high wall constructed in 1767. Unlike other religious structures of Bahia, it lacks a monument pediment at its entrance. The convent and church have portals that open to street level. The stone portal of the church, brought by José Moreira Leal from Lisbon in 1754, is in an ornate baroque style with a large pediment, volutes, and a niche. The stone cartouche at center of the pediment retains a carving, "Virgem Sm.^{a} da Lapa e Conceição".

The structure has a broad patio at center, which leads to a gallery of rooms for members of the convent community; the convent additionally had meeting rooms, halls, and corridors. The gallery leads to the upper choir, which is reserved for the exclusive use of the community. A house for the chaplain of the Lapa convent was constructed at the opposite side of the patio.

=== Church interior ===
Eugénio Ávila Lins described the interior "one of the finest rococo compositions in the city". The origin and date of delivery of the two large panels of azulejos of the chancel are unknown. They depict Our Lady of the Conception in a detailed deep blue painting. The panels are framed with pilasters, garlands, and angels, all in the baroque style. The panel on the right wall is titled Adoração dos Pastores, but is of unknown authorship. The panel has a legend reading Nesta Lapa se abrevia toda a gloria e sua luz; pois nella o sol de Jesus nasceo de aurora Maria. The panel at left has an image of the Virgin Mary in a procession to the new church, with a legend reading Bem intenta a devoção dar-lhe lugar mais decente porem na Lapa somente quer ter a veneração.

The retable of the Church of Lapa is in the late baroque style and was designed by Antônio Mendes da Silva in 1755. It has "powerful" baroque-style Solomonic columns, four on each side of its central part, surmounted by a canopy in the form of a crown, supported by figures of caryatids. The retable has numerous rococo design features, including angels, cherubs, phytomorphic elements, and tassels. The ceiling of the chancel is painted and image of the Virgin Mary superimposed Holy Trinity, as well as religious figures receiving the habit of the Conceptionist order.

The chancel and high altar of the Church of Lapa, unlike other churches of Bahia, was not renovated in the Neoclassical style; its elements are original to the structure. An exception is the altar table, which was originally of wood, then silver. It was replaced by one in marble in the Neoclassical style in the 19th century.

Side altars sit to either side of the chancel at the front of the nave.

=== Sacristy ===
The sacristy of the Lapa Convent was built behind the wall of the high altar and was the width of the church. This original sacristy, although humbly decorated, once had rich ceiling paintings, a lavabo, and sacristy chest. The original sacristy had a retable designed in 1785 by José Nunes de Santana. It has been missing since the mid-20th century. The original sacristy is no longer used by the church or convent; the current sacristy is in a lateral corridor.

=== Belvedere ===
The Convent of Lapa has a three-story belvedere, a feature found in the nearby Church and Convent of Our Lady of the Exile (Portuguese: Igreja e Convento de Nossa Senhora do Desterro). The belvedere dates to approximately 1785, when a set of white azulejos arrived from Lisbon to cover the pyramid of the tower.

== Protected status ==
The Church and Convent of Our Lady of the Conception of Lapa was listed as a historic structure by the National Institute of Historic and Artistic Heritage (IPHAN) in 1938. Both the structure and its contents were included in the IPHAN directive under inscription number 79. The carvings and retable by Antônio Mendes da Silva are likely the sole remaining works of the artist.

== Access ==
The church of the is open to the public and may be visited. The convent and school to the south of the complex and the site of the martyrdom of Joana Angélica are closed to the public.
