= Joana Angélica =

Brazilian nun and independence figure (1761–1822)

Sóror Joana Angelica de Jesus
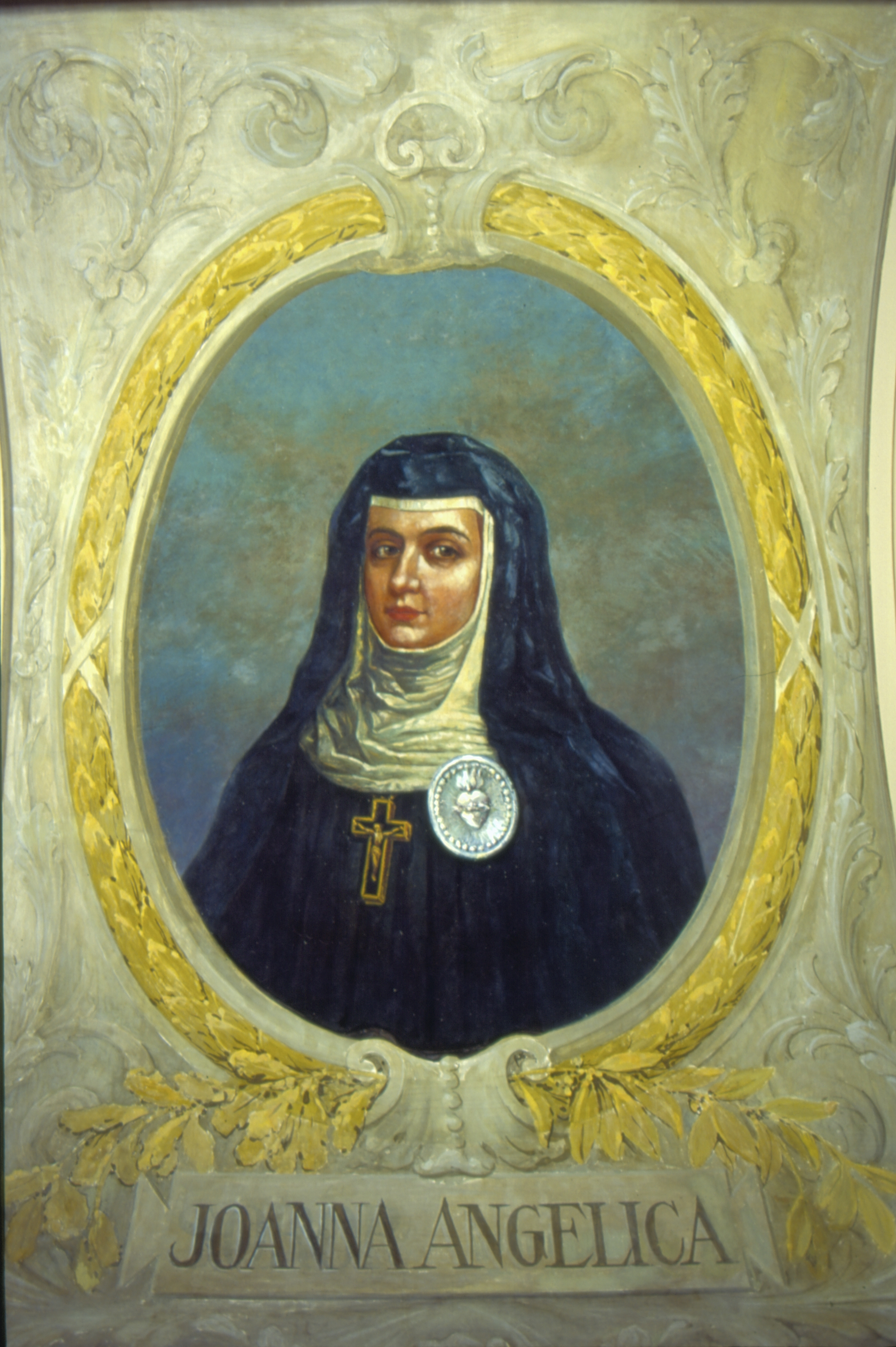
- Portrait of Sister Joana Angélica, by Domenico Failutti
- Born: December 12, 1761; Salvador, Colonial Brazil, Portuguese Empire
- Died: February 19, 1822 (aged 60); Salvador, United Kingdom of Portugal, Brazil and the Algarves, Portuguese Empire
- Occupation: Catholic nun

Sister Joana Angélica de Jesus, registered as Joanna Angelica de Jesus (December 12, 1761 – February 19, 1822) was a Brazilian Conceptionist nun, belonging to the Reformed Order of Our Lady of Conception, and martyr of the Brazilian Independence.

Born during the colonial period, she died at age 60, stabbed by a bayonet blow when resisting the invasion of the Convent of Lapa, in Salvador, by Portuguese troops. She became the first heroine of the independence of Brazil.

The nun became known as saying the famous phrase: “Para trás, bandidos! Respeitai a casa de Deus! Só entrarão passando por cima do meu cadáver! (Back off, bandits! Respect the house of God. You will only get in over my dead body!)”. However, an extensive document search concerning the life of Joana Angelica found no evidence that the phrase was in fact uttered by the sister.

== Early life and ordination ==
She was the daughter of José Tavares de Almeida and Catarina Maria da Silva, a rich family from Salvador. She was baptized at Freguezia da Santa Fé, at the Bahian capital.

She was 20 years old when she was accepted, as an exception, to her novitiate in the Convent of Our Lady of the Conception of Lapa in 1782. Her profession of faith was made on May 18, 1783, when she joined the Order of the Reformed Religious of Our Lady of the Conception and was renamed Joana Angelica de Jesus. She remained secluded there for 20 years, and was a scribe, mistress of novices, counselor, vicar, and finally abbess, until her death.

== Attack to the convent ==
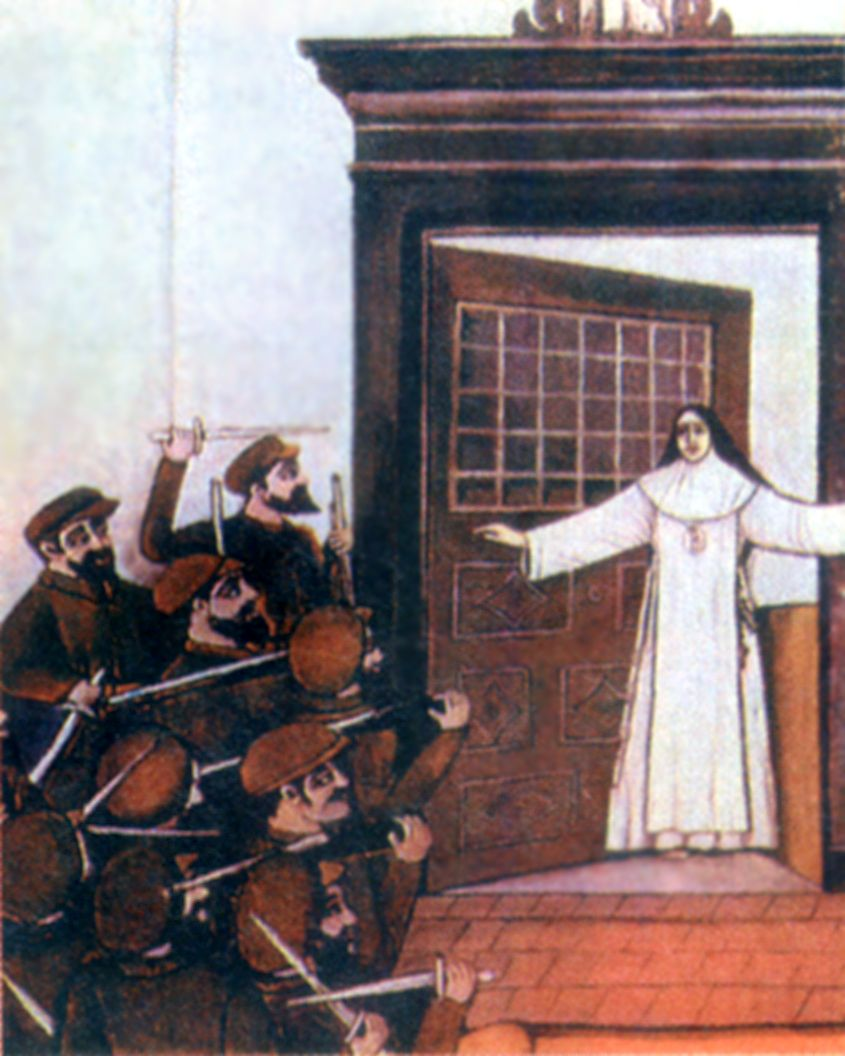
Martyrdom of Sister Angélica.

There are two conflicting versions of the episode of the attack on the Convent of Lapa. For the Brazilian historian Bernardino José de Souza, the Portuguese version, sponsored mainly by the Portuguese historian José d'Arriaga, has no support in documents. According to d'Ariaga's report, agents of the reactionary (pro-Independence) party had hidden in the convent and shot the soldiers inside the building. Brazilian historians, however, say that Portuguese troops broke in several buildings, practicing robberies and even deaths, under the pretext that shots had left from within a certain place; as had happened with the convent. The newspaper Diário da Bahia published in its edition of July 2, 1936, a complete report on the attack on the convent and the sister's martyrdom. It contains a description of the political crisis and excesses committed by the Portuguese soldiers:

The city is surprised by the designation of Madeira de Mello for the commando of the Arms of the Province. Victorious, the commanders of Madeira seize the city (...) hatred and revenge. Fires and looting. Savagery and homicides.

A solid colonial construction, still existing in the capital of Bahia, the Convent of Lapa consists of a cloister, whose main entrance is garrisoned by an iron gate. A group of soldiers tried to break into the gate while Joanna Angelica ordered the sisters to flee from the back. In order to protect the cloister and integrity of the sisters, Angélica was placed as a last obstacle between the convent and the Portuguese troops.

== Resting place ==
The remains of Joana Angélica are found at the Convent of Lapa in close proximity to her place of death. A memorial housing her remains is located in a room to the rear of the name of the convent.

== Access ==
The Church of the Blessed Sacrament of Saint Anne and memorial to Joana Angélica are open to the public and may be visited; the convent and the site of martyrdom of Joana Angélica are now a school and are closed to the public.
