= Manuel Cardoso de Saldanha =

Portuguese military engineer, active in colonial Brazil

- Born: 1700s
- Died: 1767
- Occupations: architect, military engineer
- Known for: colonial architecture
- Notable work: Church of Nossa Senhora da Conceição da Praia, now known as the Basilica of the Immaculate Conception

Manuel Cardoso de Saldanha (Portugal, 17?? - Salvador, Brazil, 1767) was a Portuguese architect and military engineer noted for his work in colonial Brazil. Little is known about his early life in Portugal. His most significant work was the design of the Church of Nossa Senhora da Conceição da Praia. The work was carried out in Portugal and executed by artisans in Salvador, Brazil. Saldanha was sent to Brazil in 1749, travelled to Portugal in 1761, but returned shortly and died in Bahia in 1767.

== Church of Nossa Senhora da Conceição da Praia ==
In the 1730s, while still in Lisbon, he was the author of the project to rebuild the Church of Nossa Senhora da Conceição da Praia, now known as the Basilica of the Immaculate Conception, in Salvador, Bahia. The lioz limestone blocks for the church were carved in Lisbon and sent to Salvador as ballast for ships. Final work on the church was carried out by the mason Eugênio da Mota from 1739. The façade is monumental and flanked by two diagonally arranged towers. According to art historian Robert Chester Smith, the design of this innovative church was the best architectural example of Johannine baroque in Brazil Colony, inspired by buildings such as the Palace of Mafra.

== Works in Brazil ==
Saldanha was appointed Sergeant Major in 1749 and sent to Brazil to serve as an engineer. Saldanha was master at the Aula de Fortificação da Bahia ("Bahia Fortification Class"), where his main students were José António Caldas and Manuel de Oliveira Mendes. He carried out many inspections of numerous buildings in disrepair in Bahia with his assistants, such as a survey of the old Cathedral of Bahia (now demolished), and other architectural projects in the colony.

=== Saltpeter expedition ===
The Portuguese court in Lisbon tested saltpeter found in Bahia in the 1750s, a material in demand for the manufacture of gunpowder, and ordered an expedition of the Serra de Montes Altos mountain region in 1757. Saldanha was selected for the expedition, and left Bahia on May 10, 1758 with João Pereira Henriques da Silva and Francisco da Cunha on the expedition. The team wrote to colonial officials a week later that the cost and difficulty of saltpeter extraction in Bahia outweighed its worth.

== Death ==
Saldanha travelled to Portugal in 1761, but returned to Bahia shortly thereafter. He died in Bahia in 1767.
