= Church and Convent of Our Lady of the Exile =

Church and convent in Salvador, Brazil

- Igreja e Convento de Nossa Senhora do Desterro
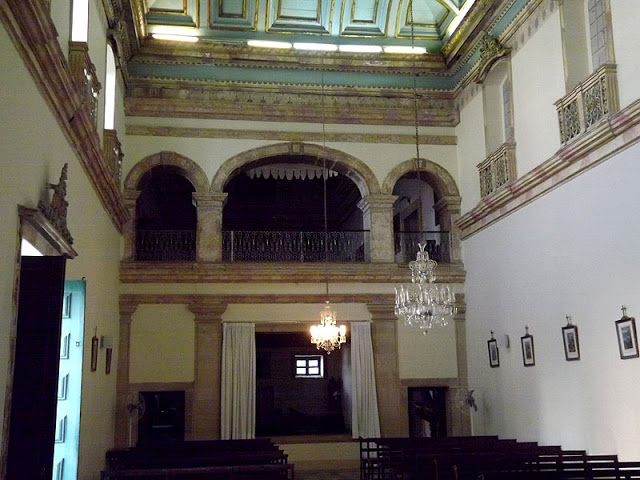
- View of interior of Church and Convent of Our Lady of the Exile

- Location of the Church and Convent of Our Lady of the Exile in Brazil

Religion
- Affiliation: Catholic
- Rite: Roman

Location
- Municipality: Salvador
- State: Bahia
- Country: Brazil
- Interactive map of Church and Convent of Our Lady of the Exile
- Coordinates: 12.977068°S 38.506640°W

Architecture
- Type: Baroque, Roccoco, Neoclassical
- Established: 1700s
- Groundbreaking: 1681

National Historic Heritage of Brazil
- Designated: 1938
- Reference no.: 30

The Church and Convent of Our Lady of the Exile (Portuguese: Igreja e Convento de Nossa Senhora do Desterro) is a 17th-century Roman Catholic church located in Salvador, Bahia, Brazil. The Convent of Our Lady of the Exile was the first female convent constructed in Brazil. Construction of the convent began in 1681 due to the donation of a large fortune of Dona Antônia de Góis, a member of the order. The church building is noted for its elaborate portal in the Rococo style. Its belvedere was the first in Salvador, followed by that of the Convent of Lapa. The high altar has images of Saint Clare, the founder of the order, and Saint Francis; they date to the mid-18th century. The interior of the church was largely renovated in the Neoclassical style in the 19th century. The church was listed as a historic structure by the National Historic and Artistic Heritage Institute in 1938.

== History ==
The Convent of Our Lady of the Exile was the first female convent in Brazil. Nuns of the Order of Saint Clare, the counterpart to the Franciscan order, arrived in Salvador in 1677 from the Convent of Santa Clara of Évora, Portugal. Construction of the convent began in 1681 on the site of a small residence of the Clares. It was largely constructed due to the donation of a large fortune of Dona Antônia de Góis, a member of the order.

== Location ==
The church and convent, now surrounded by dense residential neighborhoods, was established outside of the walls of the city of Salvador. It was located on second range of hills on the outskirts of the city and overlooked the Tororo Dyke (Dique de Tororo). The church and convent are located in close proximity to the Church of the Blessed Sacrament of Saint Anne.

== Structure ==
The Church and Convent of Our Lady of the Exile was built around two courtyards. Its belvedere, the first in Salvador, is typical of convents in Portugal in the 17th and 18th centuries. The complex was completed over approximately a century. Its tower was completed in the early 18th century, and is "crowned by one of the first and most beautiful domes in Salvador." The church has a single nave, chancel, a lower choir, and upper choir. The altar has elements from the 18th century, notably 18th-century images Saint Clare and Saint Francis. Similarly to many churches in Salvador of the 19th century, its Baroque wood carvings were replaced with those of Neoclassical design. The external portal is of lioz limestone imported from Lisbon in 1754.

== Protected status ==
The Church and Convent of Our Lady of the Exile was listed as a historic structure by the National Institute of Historic and Artistic Heritage in 1938 under inscription number 30.

== Access ==
The Church and Convent of Our Lady of the Exile is not open to the public and may not be visited.
