= Church of the Blessed Sacrament at Rua do Passo =

Roman Catholic church in Bahia, Brazil

- Igreja do Santíssimo Sacramento da Rua do Passo
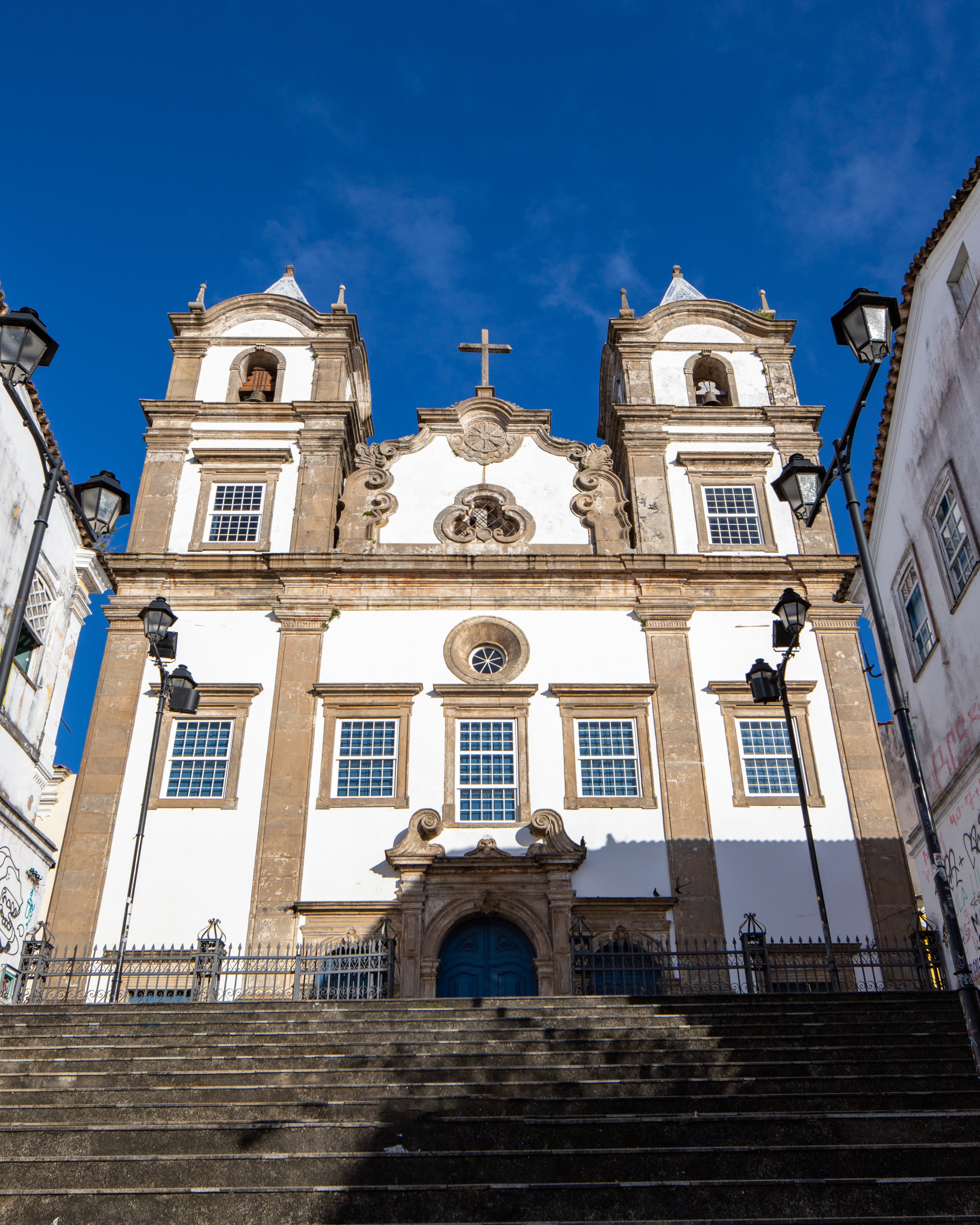
- Church of the Blessed Sacrament at Rua do Passo viewed from base of stairway viewed from Ladeira do Carmo

- Location of the Church of the Blessed Sacrament at Rua do Passo in Brazil

Religion
- Affiliation: Catholic
- Rite: Roman

Location
- Municipality: Salvador
- State: Bahia
- Country: Brazil
- Interactive map of Church of the Blessed Sacrament at Rua do Passo
- Coordinates: 12.973000°S 38.509437°W

Architecture
- Established: 1718

National Historic Heritage of Brazil
- Designated: 1938
- Reference no.: 122

The Church of the Blessed Sacrament at Rua do Passo (Portuguese: Igreja do Santíssimo Sacramento da Rua do Passo, also Igreja do Santíssimo Sacramento do Passo) is an 18th-century Roman Catholic church in Salvador, Bahia, Brazil. It is dedicated to the Blessed Sacrament (Portuguese: santíssimo sacramento). The Church of the Blessed Sacrament at Rua do Passo was listed as a historic structure by National Institute of Historic and Artistic Heritage (IPHAN) in 1938 and is part of the Historic Center of Salvador UNESCO World Heritage Site.

== History ==
The Parish of the Blessed Sacrament at Rua do Passo (Freguesia do Santíssimo Sacramento da Rua do Passo) was established 1718 by the fifth archbishop of Salvador, Sebastião Monteiro da Vide (1643-1722). A royal warrant was issued by Portugal in 1736 to fund the construction of the main chapel, and work began on a new chancel in the following year. Its name is a reference to one of the Stations of the Cross. The annual procession commemorating Christ Carrying the Cross left from the Church and Convent of Our Lady of Mount Carmel to the Sé Cathedral, now demolished.

== Location ==
The Church of the Blessed Sacrament at Rua do Passo sits on a hill above a long, broad staircase between two streets, Rua do Passo and Ladeira do Carmo. The church is now surrounded by numerous sobrados, or city homes of the Portuguese colonial period. The façade faces east towards the city, and the rear of the church west with a view of the Bay of All Saints.

== Structure ==
The Church of the Blessed Sacrament at Rua do Passo has a monumental façade, with two tall towers crowned by pyramids and a center with a large frontispiece, emphasize the verticality and monumentality of the church. The church has an underground with an ossuary, a ground floor with a main chapel and sacristy, and an upper floor with tribune and choir.

=== Staircase ===
The staircase that leads to the Church of the Blessed Sacrament is a separate monument and does not belong to the church itself. It was built at a 50 degree angle from street level at Ladeira do Carmo up to Rua do Passo. The staircase represents a "path of penitence".

=== Exterior ===
The façade of the church is covered of brick and stone masonry.

=== Interior ===
The floor plan of Church of the Blessed Sacrament is typical of eighteenth century Bahian church architecture. It features lateral corridors superposed by tribunes and sacristy. The sacristy provides access to the ossuary in the lower level. The interior of the church is in the Neoclassical style, common in Brazil in the 18th century. Paintings on the ceiling of the nave are attributed to António Dias and António Pinto.

== Renovation ==
Significant renovation and expansion of the church was conducted between 1820 and 1890. Repairs were made to the south tower and a cornice; running verandas were constructed along the nave. Renovations to the nave included the restoration of a fallen panel, remodeling of the retable of the high altar, the construction of additional altars, and the installation of azulejos. The church again fell into significant disrepair in the 20th century. It was closed and remains under repair by the federal government.

== In film & television ==
O Pagador de Promessas, a 1962 drama film by Anselmo Duarte, was filmed on the staircase of the church. The film won the Palme d'Or at the 1962 Cannes Film Festival. The staircase were also featured on The Amazing Race 13.

== Protected status ==
The Church of the Blessed Sacrament at Rua do Passo was listed as a historic structure by the National Institute of Historic and Artistic Heritage in 1938. It is listed in the Book of Historical Works process no. 122-T, inscription no. 127; and the Book of Fine Arts, Inscription fls 23. Both directives are dated June 17, 1938.

== Access ==
The church is opened to the public and may be visited. The south belfry of the church may be accessed as part of a guided tour of the church.

== See also ==
- Catholic Church in Brazil
