= Church do Santíssimo Sacramento e Sant'Ana =

Church in Nazaré, Salvador, Bahia, Brazil

Church of the Blessed Sacrament of Saint Anne
- Igreja do Santíssimo Sacramento e Sant'Ana
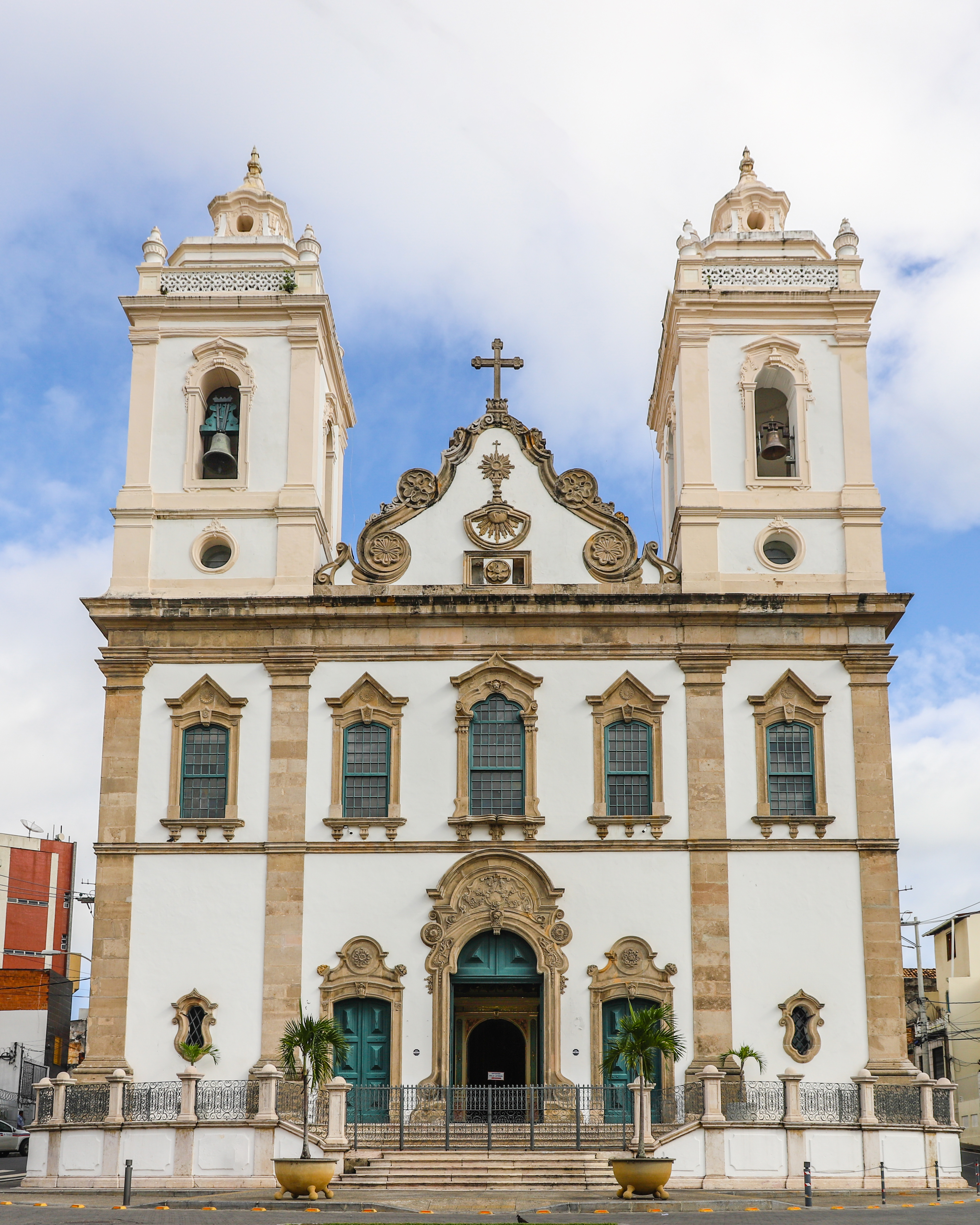
- Church of the Blessed Sacrament of Saint Anne (Igreja do Santíssimo Sacramento de Sant'Ana), Salvador

- Location of the Church of the Blessed Sacrament of Saint Anne in Brazil Church do Santíssimo Sacramento e Sant'Ana (South America)

Religion
- Affiliation: Catholic
- Diocese: Nazaré
- Rite: Roman
- Ownership: Roman Catholic Archdiocese of São Salvador da Bahia

Location
- Municipality: Salvador
- State: Bahia
- Country: Brazil
- Interactive map of Church of the Blessed Sacrament of Saint Anne
- Coordinates: 12.976943°S 38.508515°W

Architecture
- Style: Baroque
- Established: 1747
- Direction of façade: North

National Historic Heritage of Brazil
- Designated: 1941
- Reference no.: 275

The Church of the Blessed Sacrament of Saint Anne (Portuguese: Igreja do Santíssimo Sacramento e Sant'Ana) is an 18th-century Roman Catholic church located in Nazaré, Salvador, Bahia, Brazil. The church is dedicated to Saint Anne and belongs to the Roman Catholic Archdiocese of São Salvador da Bahia. Its construction began in 1747 and continued over the next two decades. The church sits on the second line of hills below the Historic Center of Salvador in the neighborhood of Nazaré. It was built on a hill above the Gravatá Fountain, which likely dates to the early 18th century. The church has a single nave with no side chapels; the side aisles are surmounted by tribunes. The transept features a cupola with a skylight, a feature unique in Bahia. The rear of the church has an ossuary constructed around a small courtyard. The church was listed as a historic structure by the National Historic and Artistic Heritage Institute in 1941.

== Location ==
The Church of the Blessed Sacrament of Saint Anne is located at the highest point of the Ladeira de Sant'Ana, a wide, sloping avenue. The Ladeira de Sant'Ana extends from the church to Avenida José Joaquim Seabra; it was once surrounded by Portuguese colonial-period homes of the 18th and 19th century.

== History ==
The Church of the Blessed Sacrament of Saint Anne was built by the master bricklayer Felipe de Oliveira Mendes.

== Ossuary ==
The ossuary of the church holds the remains of numerous figures of Bahian history. They include those of Maria Quitéria (1792-1853), a Brazilian lieutenant and national heroine of the Brazilian War of Independence.

== Protected status ==
The Church of the Blessed Sacrament of Saint Anne was listed as a historic structure by the National Institute of Historic and Artistic Heritage in 1941. Both the structure and its contents were included in the IPHAN directive under inscription number 275.

== Access ==
The Church of the Blessed Sacrament of Saint Anne is open to the public and may be visited.
