= Chapel of the Holy Body =

Roman Catholic church in Bahia, Brazil

- Capela do Corpo Santo
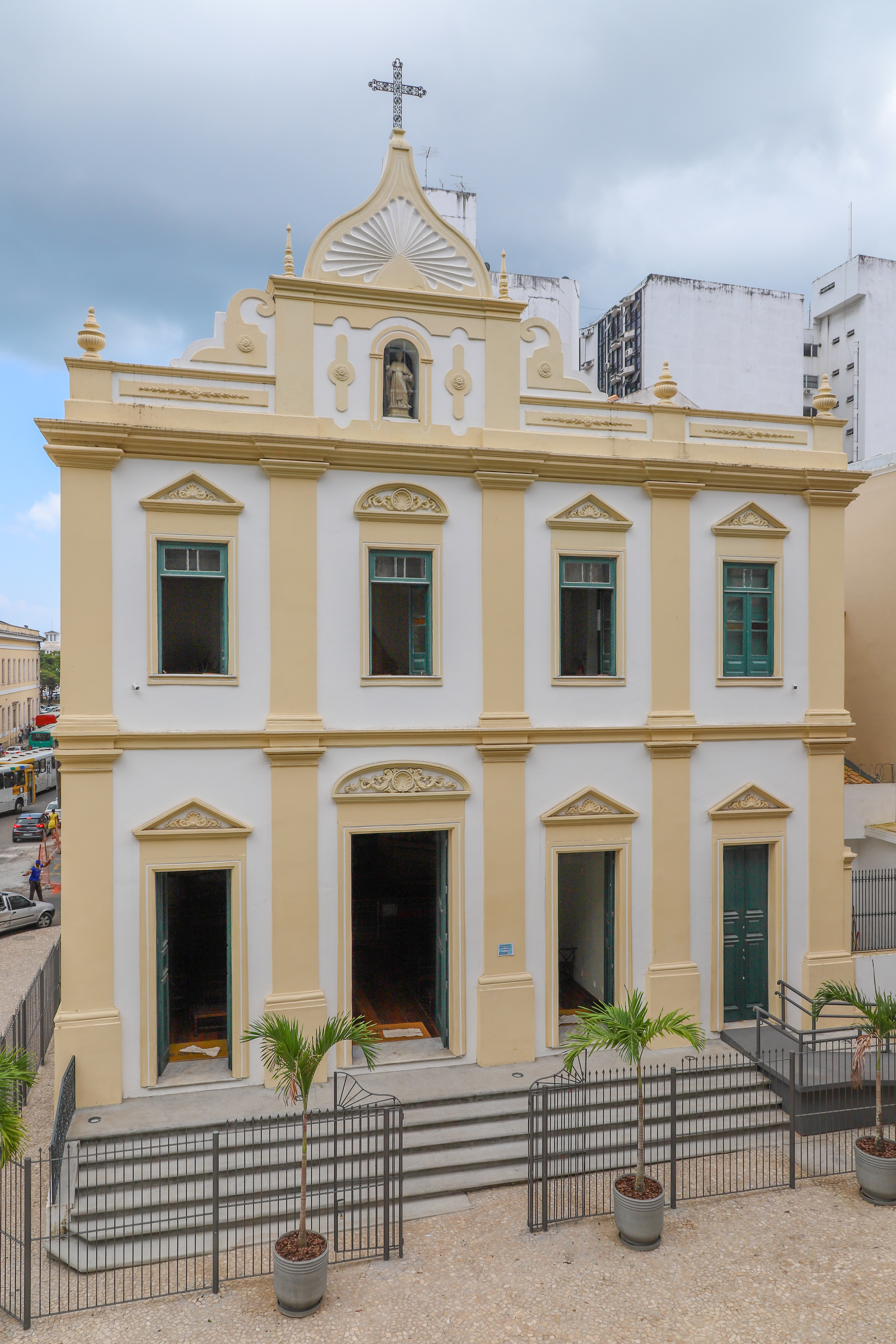
- Chapel of the Holy Body, Salvador, Bahia, Brazil

- Location of the Chapel of the Holy Body in Brazil Chapel of the Holy Body (South America)

Religion
- Affiliation: Catholic
- Rite: Roman
- Ownership: Roman Catholic Archdiocese of São Salvador da Bahia

Location
- Municipality: Salvador
- State: Bahia
- Country: Brazil
- Interactive map of Chapel of the Holy Body
- Coordinates: 12.97334°S 38.512949°W

Architecture
- Style: Renaissance
- Established: 1711
- Direction of façade: West

National Historic Heritage of Brazil
- Designated: 1938
- Reference no.: 122

The Chapel of the Holy Body (Portuguese: Capela do Corpo Santo, Capela de São Pedro Gonçalves do Corpo Santo, Capela de São Pedro Gonçalves do Corpo Santo) is an 18th-century Roman Catholic church in Salvador, Bahia, Brazil. The church is dedicated to Saint Peter González; Saint Joseph is also venerated by the congregation. It belongs to the Roman Catholic Archdiocese of São Salvador da Bahia. The church is the seat of the Brotherhood de São José do Corpo Santo, which also manages the property. A large scale image of Our Father of Salvation (Nosso Senhor da Redenção) attributed to Francisco das Chagas is located in the church.

== History ==
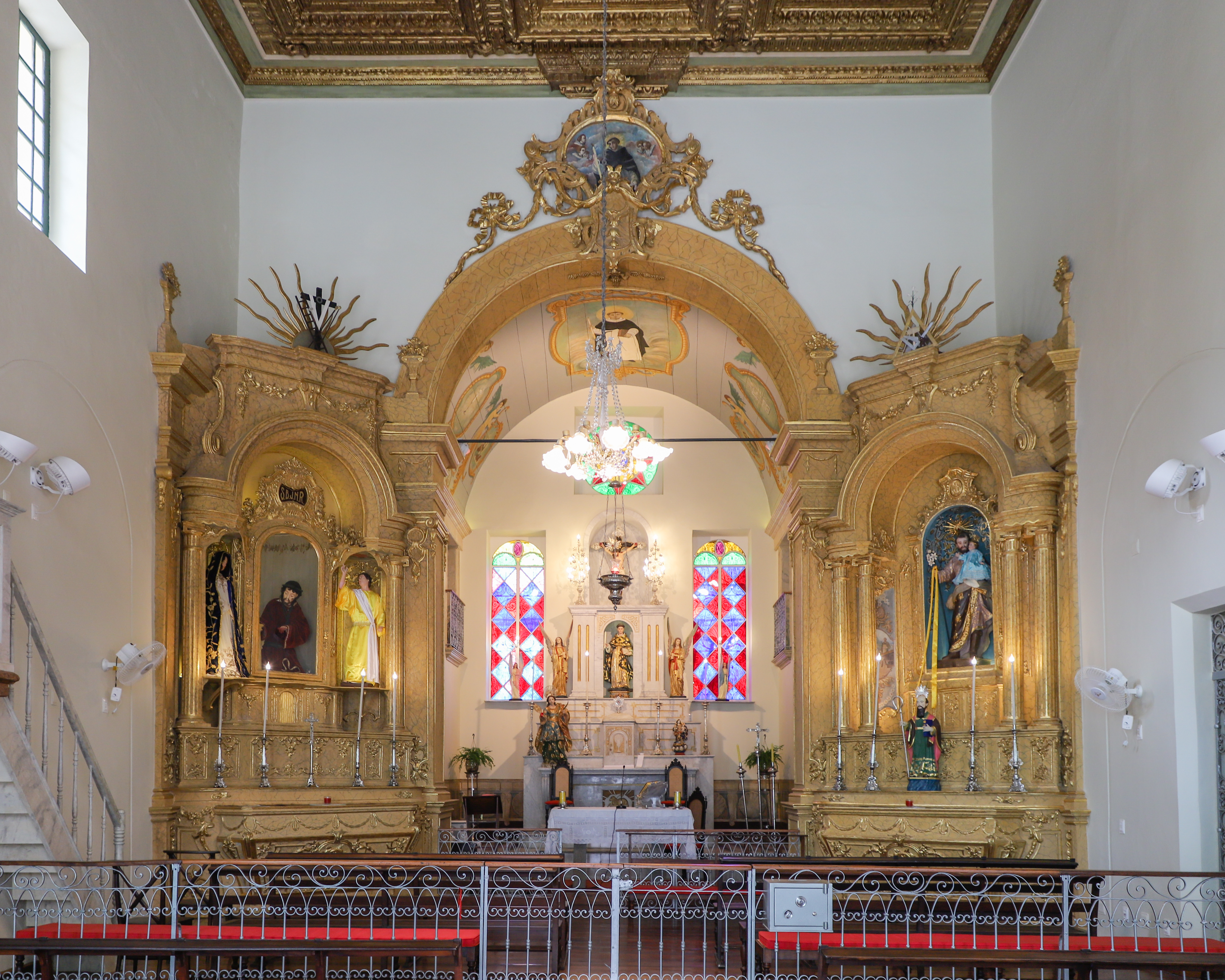
View of nave and chancel

The Chapel of the Holy Body was founded by Pedro Gonçalves, a Spanish sailor, in 1711. Gonçalves built the church after surviving a storm in the Bay of All Saints to fulfill a vow he made to the Virgin Mary for his survival. Gonçalves returned to Salvador in the second decade of the 18th century on a voyage from Angola. The 150 travelers on the boat were infected by smallpox and were ordered to the Ilha dos Frades by the City Council of the city for quarantine. The episode led the Portuguese Crown to authorize the Brotherhood of the Holy Body to build a hospital for sailors. The Portuguese Crown established a subsidy of 2,000 reis for each caravel that landed in Salvador and a portion of various fines charged to sailors. The hospital was never built and the city of Salvador requested that the Crown revoke the subsidy.

The chapel has hosted numerous brotherhoods over its long history. They include the Irmandade do Glorioso São Pedro Gonçalves, the Irmandade do Senhor Bom Jesus dos Necessitados e Redenção dos Pretos do Daomé, the Irmandade de Nossa Senhora do Rosário, and the Irmandade de São José.

The chapel served as a parish church from 1736 to 1756 until the completion of the Church of Our Lady of the Conception of Praia, now known as the Basilica of the Immaculate Conception, Salvador. Gonçalves built the church with a façade facing the Bay of All Saints; he later reduced the size of the structure in half and change the direction of the façade and interior. The coexistence of the brotherhoods at the church was not always peaceful. Relationships between them worsened after the Brazilian War of Independence, where fighting occurred in Bahia between 1822 and 1823.

Dr. José Eduardo Freire de Carvalho Filho, Intendant of Salvador, ordered a major modification of the church in 1902. Rua Santos Dumont, an avenue behind the church, was enlarged. This required a reconstruction of the façade of the church. The church now faces a narrow street and numerous small businesses.

The church has undergone numerous renovation and refurbishment in the 20th and 21st century. The roof, window frames, railings, and linings were repaired in 1952. The church closed for renovation in 2009. Work only began on the project 2016 and the church reopened in 2018. The ceiling of the church, once painted blue, appeared to have been gilded early in the history of the church. The interior of the nave and chancel were entirely covered in gold leaf as part of the renovation.

== Location ==
The Chapel of the Holy Body is located in the lower city (cidade baixa) of Salvador on a corner of Praça Cairu and is surrounded by the former residences of wealthy merchants. The chapel is a short distance from the Elevador Lacerda.

== Structure ==
The Chapel of the Holy Body is constructed of stone and lime masonry. The ceiling is of gamela wood. The chapel is home to an image of Our Father of Salvation (Nosso Senhor da Redenção) is attributed to Francisco das Chagas, also known as Cabra, is one of the most important Baroque sculptures in Brazil. The interior of the church is simple and resembles rural chapels of Bahia of the 17th and 18th century; the ground floor consists of a nave, chancel, and sacristy. A meeting room of the Brotherhood is above the sacristy. The nave has a coffered ceiling, once painted in blue or white and now gilded. The ceiling likely had numerous paintings in its panels as in other coffered ceilings of churches in Bahia, but they are now painted in a neutral green.

== Protected status ==
The Chapel of the Holy Body, both the structure and its contents, was listed as a historic structure by the National Institute of Historic and Artistic Heritage in 1938 under inscription number 122.

== Access ==
The Chapel of the Holy Body is open to the public and may be visited.
