= Archbishop's Palace of Salvador =

- Palácio Arquiepiscopal de Salvador
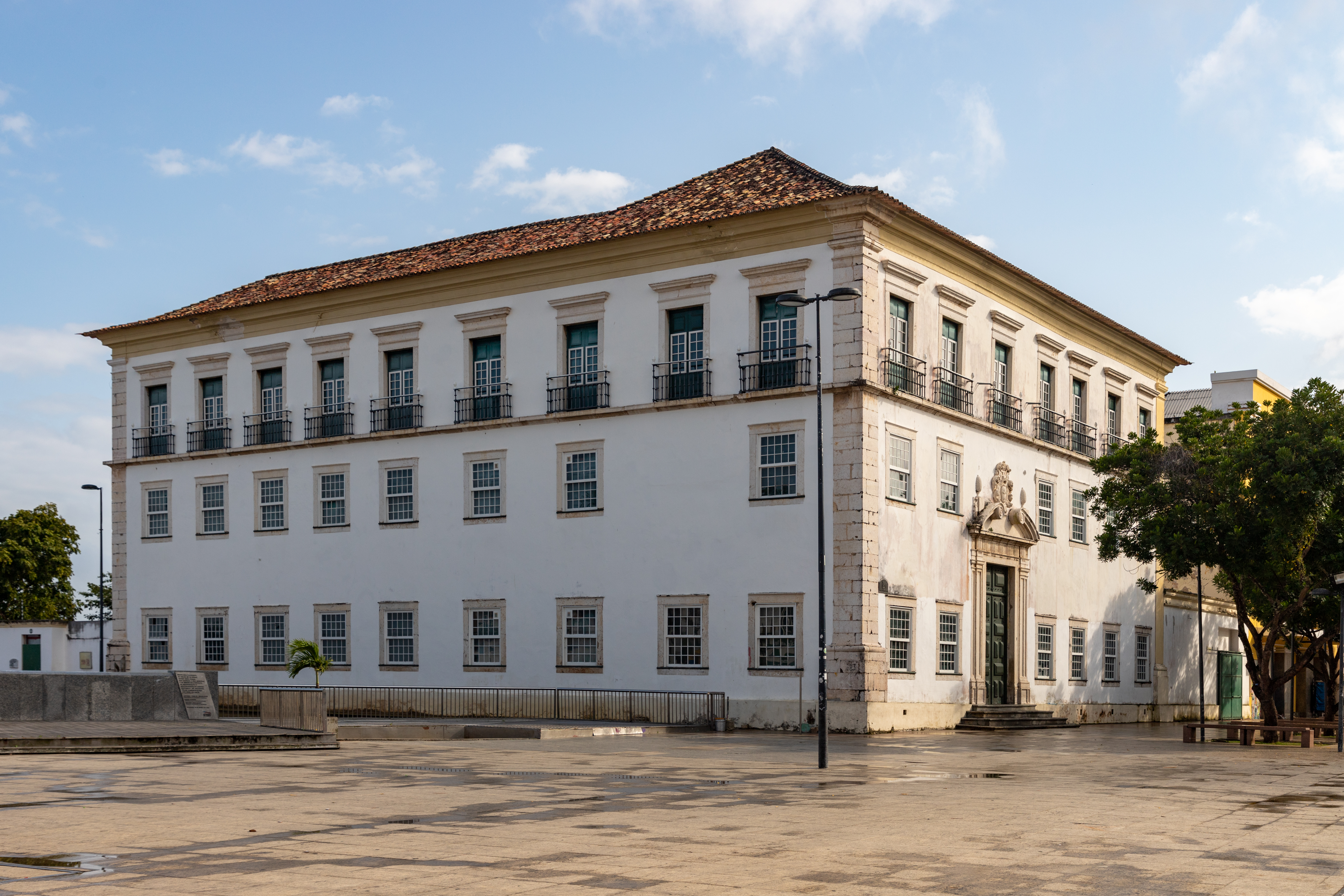
- Archbishop's Palace of Salvador

- Location within Brazil

General information
- Location: Salvador, Bahia, Brazil
- Coordinates: 12.973379°S 38.511337°W
- Elevation: 75 metres (246 ft)
- Completed: 1715
- Owner: Roman Catholic Archdiocese of São Salvador da Bahia

National Historic Heritage of Brazil
- Designated: 1938
- Reference no.: 122/16

The Archbishop's Palace of Salvador (Portuguese: Palácio Arquiepiscopal de Salvador, also Palácio do Arcebispado de Salvador, Palácio Arquiepiscopal da Sé) is an episcopal residence in Salvador, Bahia, Brazil. It is located on the Praça da Sé in the Pelourinho historical district of the city. The palace was built in the early eighteenth century and is one of the best examples of Portuguese colonial-period civil architecture in Brazil. The Archbishop's Palace was listed as a historic structure by the National Historic and Artistic Heritage Institute in 1938. IPHAN transferred ownership of the palace to the Archdiocese of São Salvador da Bahia in 2011. The palace sits within the UNESCO World Heritage Site of the Historic Center of Salvador. Part of the structure was converted into a cultural center, the Cultural Center of the Palácio da Sé, which opened in 2020.

== History ==
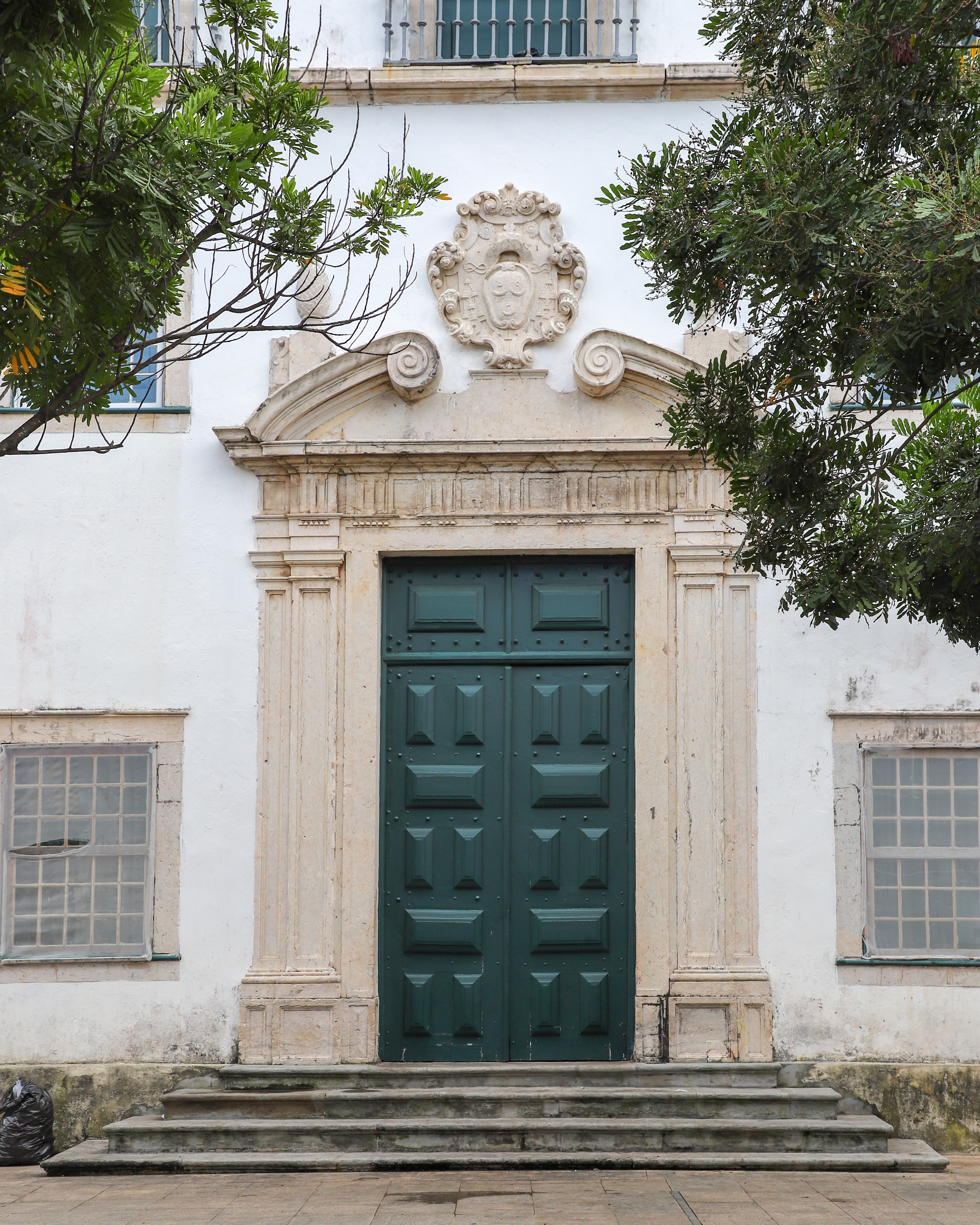
Baroque-style portal of the palace with the coat of arms of Archbishop Sebastião Monteiro da Vide (1643-1722) at center of the pediment

The Archbishop's Palace dates to the early 18th century, when a royal charter authorized the construction of a residence for the archbishop in the Terreiro de Jesus. Sebastião Monteiro da Vide (1643-1722) arrived in Bahia on May 22, 1702, and held the office of archbishop until his death. His petition for the construction of a residence was authorized by the Queen Regent on March 13, 1705. A site adjacent to the Sé Cathedral was chosen in 1707 on the site of a hermitage of the Brotherhood of Saint Peter of the Clergy. The building was completed in 1715. The palace fell into disrepair and disuse in the 20th century after the demolition of the former Sé Cathedral. The National Historic and Artistic Heritage Institute (IPHAN) took ownership of the building in 1938.

Ownership of the palace was passed to the Roman Catholic Archdiocese of São Salvador da Bahia in March 2011, which then negotiated with the National Historic and Artistic Heritage Institute on the future use of the structure.

== Structure ==
The art historian Germain Bazin described the palace as a "great cube of masonry decorated with an elegant door." The structure consists of three stories at street level above a basement. It has a main façade with three floors. The entrance is marked by a portal in Lioz stone decorated with a coat of arms flanked by stylized scrolls. The coat of arms is that of Sebastião Monteiro da Vide, archbishop of Salvador at the time of the construction of the building.

The façade of the palace has an elaborate Baroque-style portal of Portuguese marble with an elaborate pediment. It has at its center the coat of arms of Dom Sebastião Monteiro da Vide with volutes at the left and right. The windows of the first two floors are relatively simple and those on the third floor higher and flanked by balconies and iron grille balconets.

Demolition of the Sé Cathedral altered the appearance of the palace. It exposed raised walkways between the two buildings and the broad, lateral façade of the palace. The site of the demolished church, next to the palace, is now a square, the Praça da Sé.

=== Interior courtyard ===
The interior of the palace is arranged around a central courtyard, or patio, a late example of those found in Italian palazzi. The courtyard provided both light and air to the interior of the building. Similar examples in Bahia can be found in Solar Berquó, Solar Boa Vista, Casa Régia, and the House of the Seven Deaths; and the plantation houses of Freguesia and Matoim, the latter now demolished.

== Cultural Center of the Palácio da Sé ==
The Cultural Center of the Palácio da Sé (Portuguese: Centro Cultural Palácio da Sé) has a permanent exhibit on the first floor called "The Church and the Formation of Brazil" (Portuguese: A Igreja e a formação do Brasil), which consists of historical artifacts owned by the Archdiocese of São Salvador. Remnants of the former Sé Cathedral form an important part of the collection. The first floor of the building also houses the Reitor Eugênio Veiga Conservation and Restaurantion Laboratory. The second floor of the cultural center has additional artifacts owned by the Archdiocese.

The cultural center occupies only part of the building; the remainder is retained by the Archdiocese for administrative and religious use.

== Protected status ==
The Archbishop's Palace was listed as a historic structure by the National Historic and Artistic Heritage Institute (IPHAN) on June 17, 1938. IPHAN took ownership of the palace in the same year.

== See also ==
- Catholic Church in Brazil
- Tira Chapéu Palace
