= Ladeira da Preguiça =

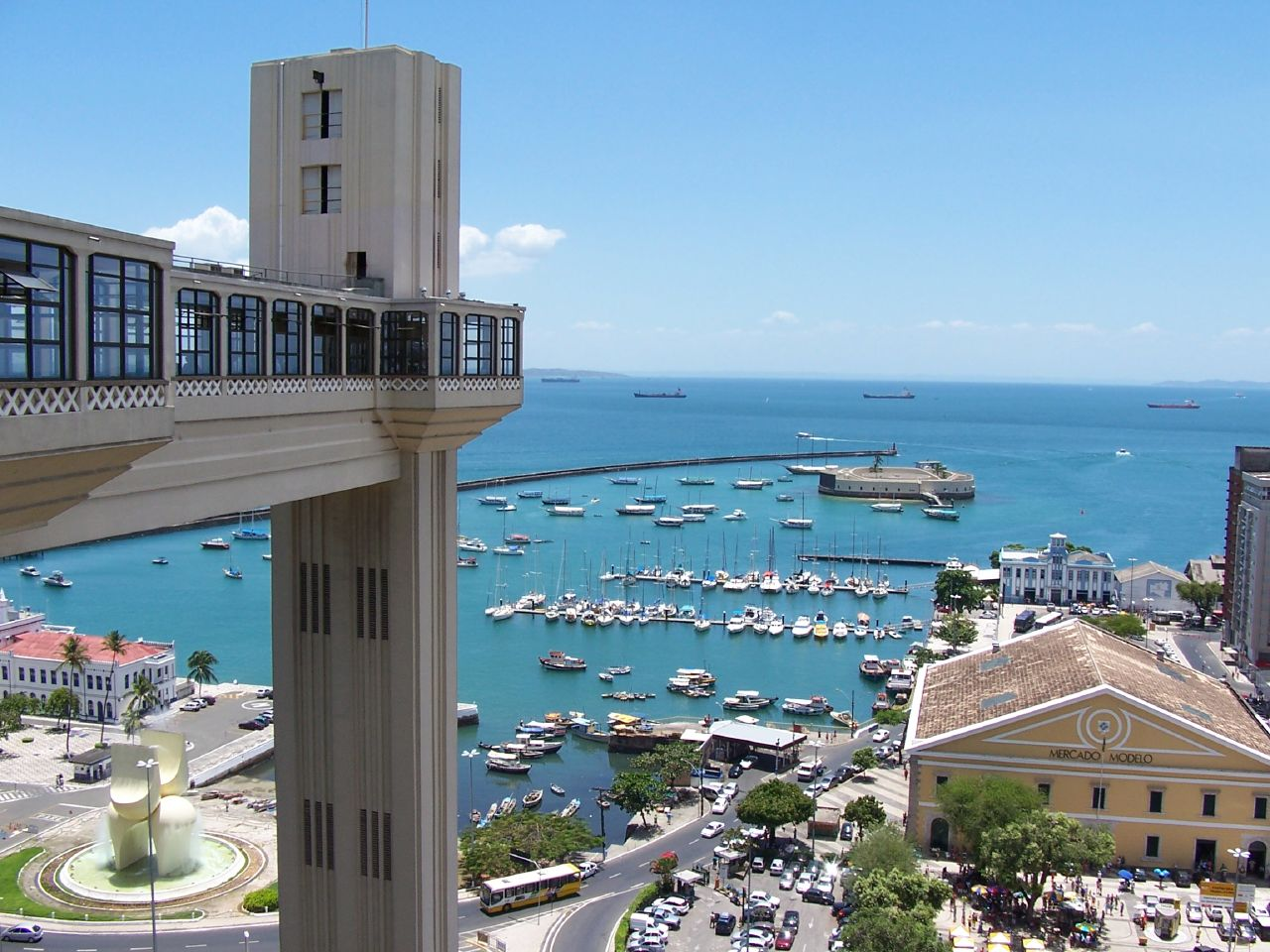
Opened in 1873, the Lacerda Elevator has reduced dramatically the importance of the old steep streets of Salvador in the flux of goods and passersby between Cidade Baixa and Cidade Alta.

The Ladeira da Preguiça (steep street of Laziness), located at the traditional Dois de Julho neighbourhood in Salvador, Bahia, Brazil, is an important way from a historical and cultural perspective.

== History ==
The Ladeira da Preguiça was one of the first three slopes built in Salvador (probably, at the 17th century), just after the opening of the steep streets of Misericórdia and Conceição. They fulfilled the role of connecting the city harbour (Downtown Salvador) with the Cidade Alta (Uptown Salvador). Its bygone importance can be measured by the fact that it gave its name to the Dois de Julho beach: Litoral da Preguiça (Coast of Laziness).

Gradually neglected in favour of easier and faster access roads, today it is in a state of abandonment, surrounded by old ruined houses.

== Origin of the name ==
The laziness quoted in the name of the steep street refers to the fact that the goods were transported from the city harbour to the Cidade Alta on the backs of slaves or in carts pulled by oxen - and pushed by slaves. The former elite, which lived in houses along the route, amused themselves with shouts of "go up, laziness!" when they witness the slaves painfully climbing the slope, weighed down by bags of goods weighing up to 60 kg or pushing carts overstocked.

However, corroborating the folkloric, biased and elitist image that the natives of Bahia (in general) and soteropolitanos (in particular) are lazy, the official site of the Tourism Authority of the City of Salvador, supports the thesis stating that the slaves, complaining of the hard labour, said that climb up the slope gave them "laziness."

== In popular culture ==
One of the most famous references to this steep street was made in the homonymous music Ladeira da Preguiça, wrote by Gilberto Gil in 1971 and recorded by many Brazilian singers, including Elis Regina.

== See also ==
- Historic Centre

== Bibliography ==
- DÓREA, Luiz Eduardo. Os nomes das ruas contam histórias. Salvador: Câmara Municipal do Salvador, 1999.
