= Palace of Saldanha =

Solar do Saldanha
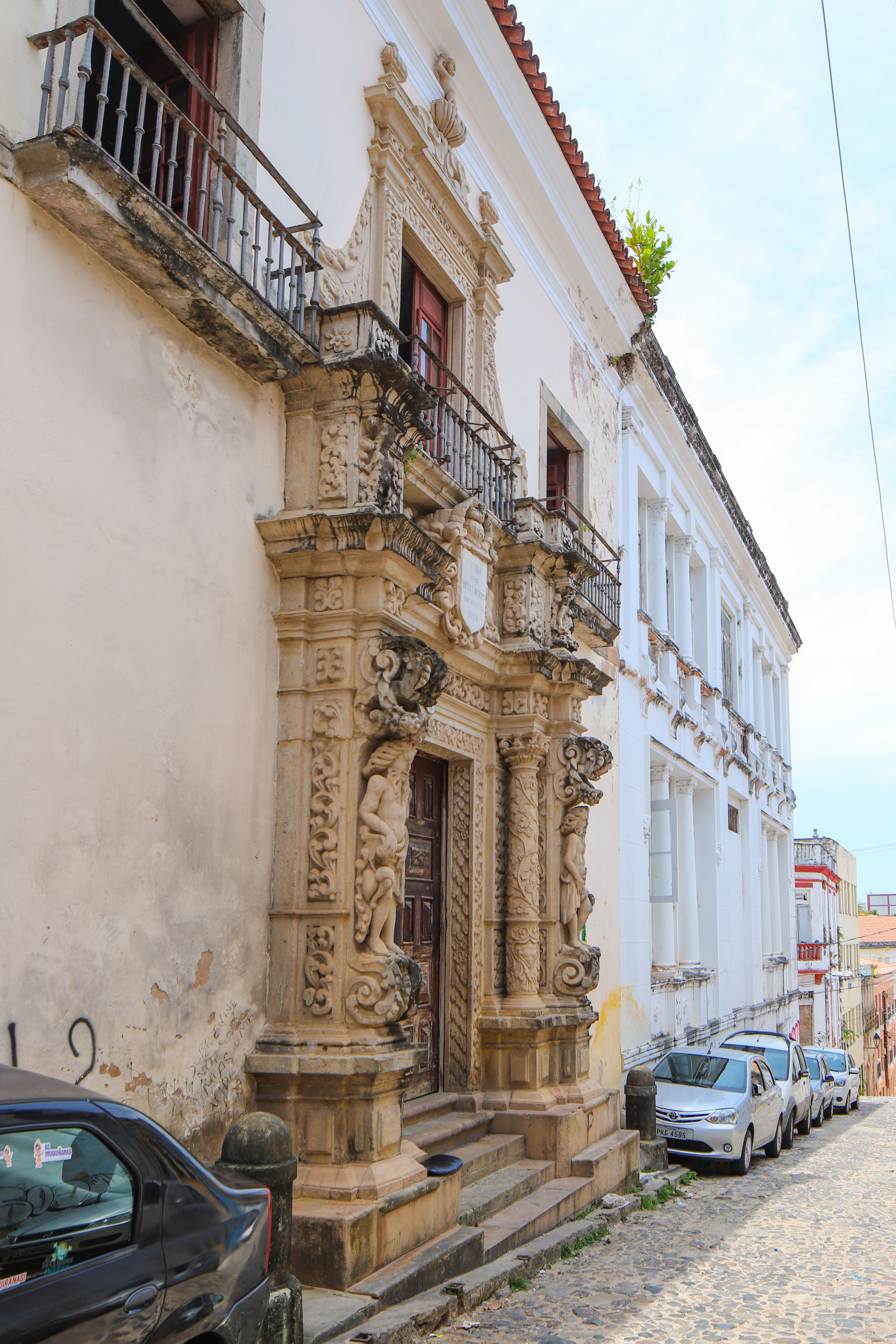
- Façade of the Palácio do Saldanha with monumental portal

- Location within Brazil
- Alternative names: Paço do Saldanha, Palace of Saldanha, Liceu de Artes e Ofícios, Arts and Crafts High School

General information
- Location: Rua Guedes de Brito, 14, Salvador, Brazil
- Coordinates: 12.974326°S 38.510828°W
- Estimated completion: 18th century

Technical details
- Floor count: 2

National Historic Heritage of Brazil
- Designated: 1938
- Reference no.: 113

The Palace of Saldanha (Portuguese: Solar do Saldanha, or Paço do Saldanha) is former residence in Salvador, Bahia, Brazil. It is located in the Historic Center of Salvador and was constructed in the early 18th century. The residence has two stories with an attic and is typical of colonial architecture of the period: the ground floor housed slaves and servants; the second floor was reserved for the family of the owner. The façade has a monumental portal with ornate carved stone with solomonic columns with floral motifs and atlantes. Germain Bazin and others attribute the portal to Gabriel Ribeiro, designer of the ornate carved stone façade of the Church of the Third Order of Saint Francis (Igreja da Ordem Terceira de São Francisco), which it resembles. Ana Maria Lacerda calls the Palace of Saldanha an "icon of colonial architecture."

It was listed as a historic structure by the National Institute of Historic and Artistic Heritage in 1938.

== History ==
Colonel Antônio da Silva Pimentel acquired some houses belonging to the Order of the Third Carmelites on the site of the current house in 1699. Silva Pimentel paid 3,000 cruzeiros for the property and demolished the small homes to build a large house. Silva Pimentel died in 1706 and left the residence to his heirs. Dom Manoel Saldanha da Gama, from whom the house takes its name, acquired the home in 1762. Saldanha da Gama was the widower of Dona Joana Guedes de Brito, a daughter of Silva Pimentel. Saldanha da Gama is also noted as the son of the viceroy of India. The house was sold in 1770 to pay the debts of Manuel I of Portugal. The carpenter Antônio da Costa Barbosa carried out restoration works in 1787. Captain-General Simão Álvares da Silva acquired the house in 1791. He requested permission from the city council of Salvador to enlarge the structure in 1799. José Joaquim de Carvalho e Albuquerque, the second Baron of Pirajá, inherited the building in 1856.

The house was acquired by the Lyceum of Arts and Crafts (Liceu de Artes e Ofícios) in 1874. The lyceum made numerous modifications to the buildings. The Solar do Saldanha was largely destroyed by fire on February 23, 1968. The fire lasted six hours and destroyed its original furniture, azulejos, chapel, paneled ceiling, roofs, and decorated screens. Its exterior walls remained and were stabilized between 1973 and 1974.

The building was fully restored in 1992 and once again became home to the Lyceum.

== Location ==
The Solar do Saldanha is located in the Historic Center of Salvador on the corner of Rua Guedes de Brito and Rua do Saldanha, a block from the Praça da Sé.

== Structure ==
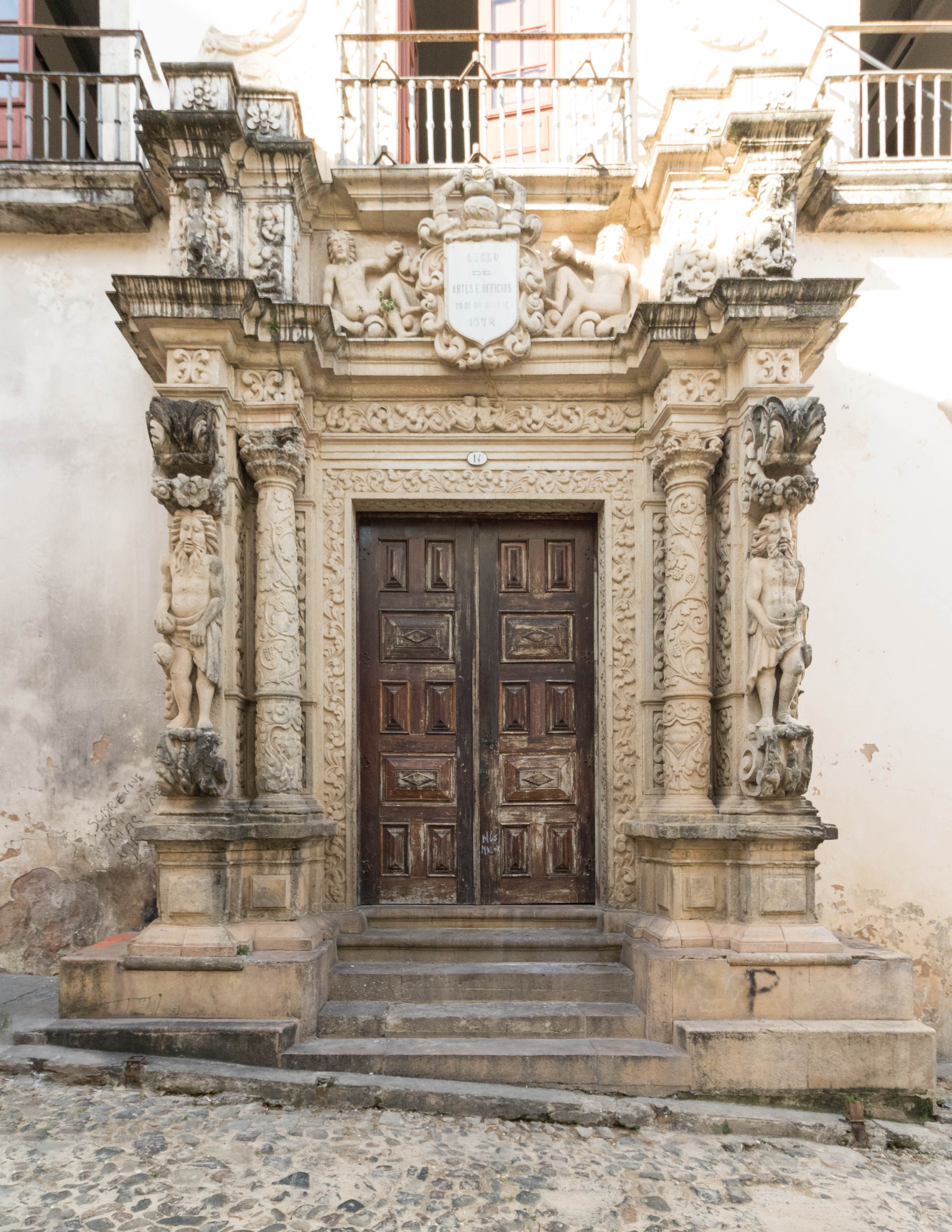
Monumental portal of the Solar do Saldanha

Solar do Saldanha has numerous structural elements common to Bahian residences of the 17th century. The house is closely aligned to the street, both at its central façade and east elevation. It opens to a vestibule with a large-scale stone staircase with the entrance to two corridors of the ground floor on either side. The ground floor was used for commerce and housing slaves and servants. The upper floor was reserved for the family. The ground floor has five windows and a main door. The street side of the home facing Rua do Saldanha has two windows and seven doors. These include a carriage house and seven shops on two fronts, with several rooms, all with windows to the bottom.

The interior of the house elaborately decorated and included a private chapel for use by the family and visitors. It has a small attic with bedrooms, a feature common to noble houses of Salvador and more widely, of Bahia. The upper floor had rooms rich with framing and carvings. A kitchen, pantry, and bathroom were likely added to the upper floor in the 19th century.

=== Portal ===
The façade has a monumental, detailed portal of lioz stone protruding slightly into the Rua do Saldanha. It extends from the sill to the cornice and incorporates atlantes, columns with a shaft surrounded by palm branches and floral motifs. The door is unique in its size and detail to Bahia, but is similar to others in Lisbon from the same period. The art historian Germain Bazin and others attribute the portal to Gabriel Ribeiro, designer of the façade of the Church of the Third Order of Saint Francis (Igreja da Ordem Terceira de São Francisco).

== Protected status ==
Solar do Saldanha was listed as a historic structure by the National Institute of Historic and Artistic Heritage in 1938.

== Access ==
Solar do Saldanha is not open to the public and may not be visited.
