= Casa Pia and College of the Orphans of Saint Joachim =

Roman Catholic church, school, and orphanage in Brazil

- Casa Pia e Colégio dos Órfãos de São Joaquim
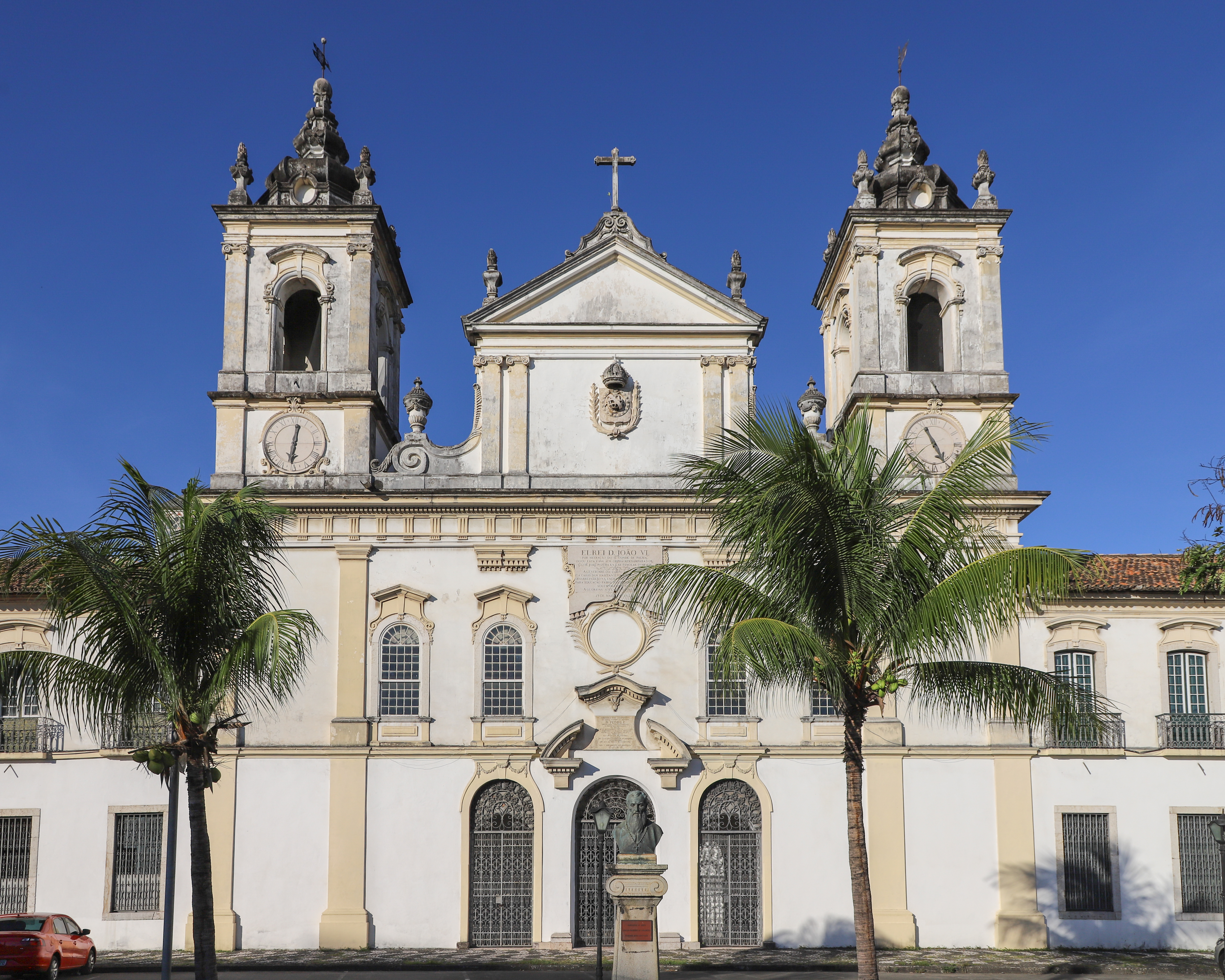
- Casa Pia and College of the Orphans of Saint Joachim

- Location of the Casa Pia and College of the Orphans of Saint Joachim in Brazil

Religion
- Affiliation: Catholic
- Rite: Roman

Location
- Municipality: Salvador
- State: Bahia
- Country: Brazil
- Interactive map of Casa Pia and College of the Orphans of Saint Joachim
- Coordinates: 12.969201°S 38.507507°W

Architecture
- Style: Baroque
- Completed: 1709

National Historic Heritage of Brazil
- Designated: 1938
- Reference no.: 82

Casa Pia and College of the Orphans of Saint Joachim (Portuguese: Casa Pia e Colégio dos Órfãos de São Joaquim) is a Roman Catholic church, school, and orphanage in Salvador, Bahia, Brazil. It was constructed as a Jesuit novitiate in the early 18th century. After the expulsion of the Jesuits from Brazil in 1759 the complex became an orphanage. The now complex now consists of a secondary school, chapel, and orphanage. One of its corridors extends south towards the Casa Nobre de Jequitaia. It was listed as a historic structure by National Institute of Historic and Artistic Heritage (IPHAN) in 1938 and is part of the Historic Center of Salvador UNESCO World Heritage Site.

== Location ==
Casa Pia is located north of the Historic Center of Salvador. The complex was originally located directly on the Bay of All Saints, but its waterfront location was lost due to successive landfill projects and commercial development. The complex now sits behind a small square on Avenida Jequitaia; the square also functions as a parking lot. The complex sits at the base of a hilly area, which still has some vegetation, that leads to the interior of the Itapagipe Peninsula.

== History ==
Construction on Casa Pia and College of the Orphans of Saint Joachim began in the early 18th century by the Society of Jesus. Domingos Afonso Sutão, a wealthy bandeirante, donated land to the Jesuits, who built a novitiate on the site in 1704 called the Noviciado da Anunciada da Jequitaia. A college, chapel, and water catchment facility on the slope were constructed starting in 1709; a Frenchman, Charles Bellaville, designed the complex. The complex developed around a large square cloister on two floors. Casa Pia served as a gathering point for 124 Jesuits leaving Bahia in 1760 as part of the expulsion of the Jesuits from Brazil. The novitiate became the property of the state in the same year.

Conde de Palma, governor of Bahia, petitioned John VI of Portugal in 1818 to donate the building for the construction of an orphanage. The building was significantly altered in this period. A wall was built to protect the building from the sea, which reached the site at the time. A mortuary chapel was added. José Teófilo de Jesus (1758-1847) completed a painting on the ceiling of the chapel in 1826 depicting the Annunciation of the Virgin Mary. The water catchment of the Jesuits were converted into bathrooms of the orphanage.

== Structure ==
Casa Pia and College of the Orphans of Saint Joachim have numerous features of Jesuit architecture of Bahia of the 18th century. The chapel consists of a single nave. Construction of the building is in stone masonry with staircase and various elements of lioz stone from Portugal. Unusually, it occupies one side of the cloister, with the axis of the nave parallel to the main facade. Two towers top Roman facade with classic pediment flanked by volutes. It once had corridors; they were replaced by the gallery of the cloister (gallery and overlapping tribunes). The chapel has a three arches, superimposed by grandstands instead of choirs. Separately, the plan and facade are modeled on the parish (matriz) and brotherhood churches of the early eighteenth century.

== Protected status ==
Casa Pia and College of the Orphans of Saint Joachim was listed as a historic structure by the National Institute of Historic and Artistic Heritage in 1938. Both the structure and its contents were included in the IPHAN directive under inscription number 227.

== Access ==
Casa Pia and College of the Orphans of Saint Joachim is not open to the public and may be visited only with permission.
