= Casa Nobre de Jequitaia =

Building in Salvador, Bahia, Brazil

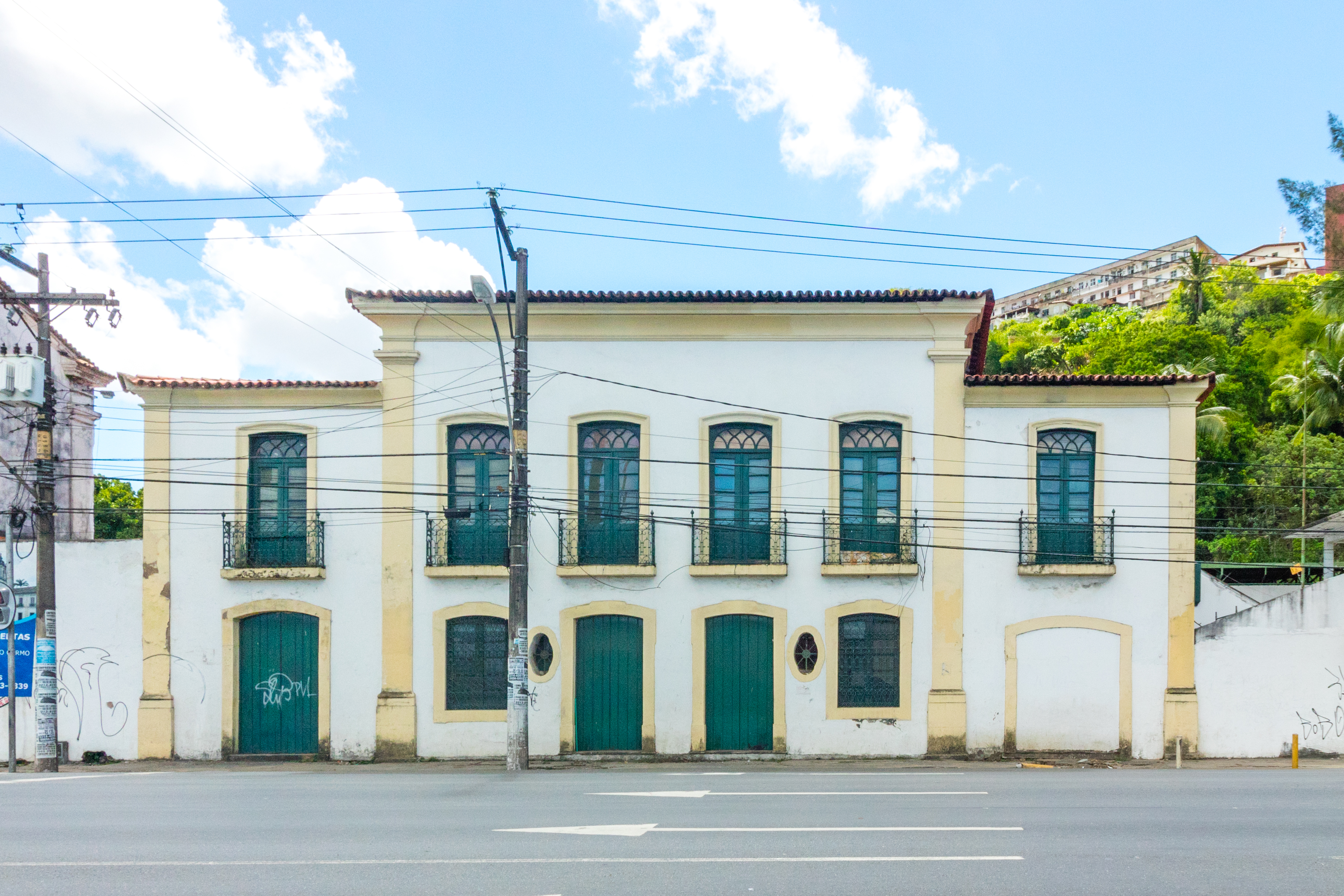
- Casa Nobre de Jequitaia

- Location within Brazil
- Alternative names: Casa à Avenida Frederico Pontes

General information
- Location: Salvador, Brazil
- Coordinates: 12.950945°S 38.500695°W
- Estimated completion: 18th century

Technical details
- Floor count: 2

Casa Nobre de Jequitaia, also known as Casa à Avenida Frederico Pontes, is an unused residence in Salvador, Bahia, Brazil. It is located in the Calçada neighborhood and likely dates to the 18th century. It was once connected by a corridor to the Casa Pia and College of the Orphans of Saint Joachim, an architectural complex that consists of a chapel, school, and orphanage. Casa Nobre de Jequitaia has two stories and is typical of Portuguese colonial architecture in Brazil: it consists of two stories and a small attic. The ground floor served as an entrance and housing for slaves and servants, the upper floor for the owner and his family; the small attic was used for bedrooms. It was listed as a historic structure by the National Institute of Historic and Artistic Heritage in 1938.

== History ==
The date of construction of the Casa Nobre de Jequitaia is unknown, but is characteristic of residential architecture of Salvador in the mid-18th century. In 1938 the building was occupied by the Center of Production Training of APAE (Centro de Treinamento de Produção da APAE); by the 1940s it was owned by the Brazilian Ministry of War.

== Location ==
Casa Nobre de Jequitaia is located in the Calçada neighborhood of Salvador, directly north of the Comércio district. The house once stood at the base of a small hill range close to the waterfront of the Bay of All Saints; due to successive landfill projects it sits farther inland. The house sits on Jequitaia Avenue, formerly known as Avenida Frederico Pontes. The house featured a broad staircase at the time of its construction, but now sits directly on the avenue with no frontage other than a narrow sidewalk. The façade of the building faces directly west on to a mixed industrial-market area on the Bay of All Saints. The house is located nearly adjacent to Casa Pia and College of the Orphans of Saint Joachim, also a protected historic architectural complex.

== Structure ==
The exterior is in stone masonry with four columns; the interior consists of concrete pillars and slabs dating to the 20th century. The ground floor has four doors and three windows with alternating curved frames and wooden jambs. The second floor has seven windows with small, decorative balconies with wooden balustrades. The lateral façades of the upper floor have windows similar to those of the main façade. The rear façade consists of an extension of the upper floor on masonry pilasters. The house has four roof eaves on a wooden frame.

It is flanked by two lateral interior galleries that extend from ground level to the roof. They are the earliest examples of lateral galleries in domestic architecture in Bahia; later examples are found in Solar Marback and the plantation house of Engenho Vitória in Cachoeira, the latter never completed.

The house is typical of Portuguese colonial domestic architecture; the ground floor served as an entrance and housing for slaves, servants, and other functions; a second floor, called the pavimento nobre, reserved exclusively for the owner and his family. A small sotão, an attic usually reserved for bedrooms of the daughters of the owner of the house, is elongated and placed perpendicular to the main axis of the roof.

The extensions to the north and south of the building are of more recent construction. It has a low right foot and eight twin windows of more recent construction. A garden is located on the south side of the house and is accessible by a staircase.

== Protected status ==
Casa Nobre de Jequitaia was listed as a historic structure by the National Institute of Historic and Artistic Heritage in 1938.

== Access ==
Casa Nobre de Jequitaia is not open to the public and may not be visited.
