= House of the Seven Deaths =

- Casa das Sete Mortes
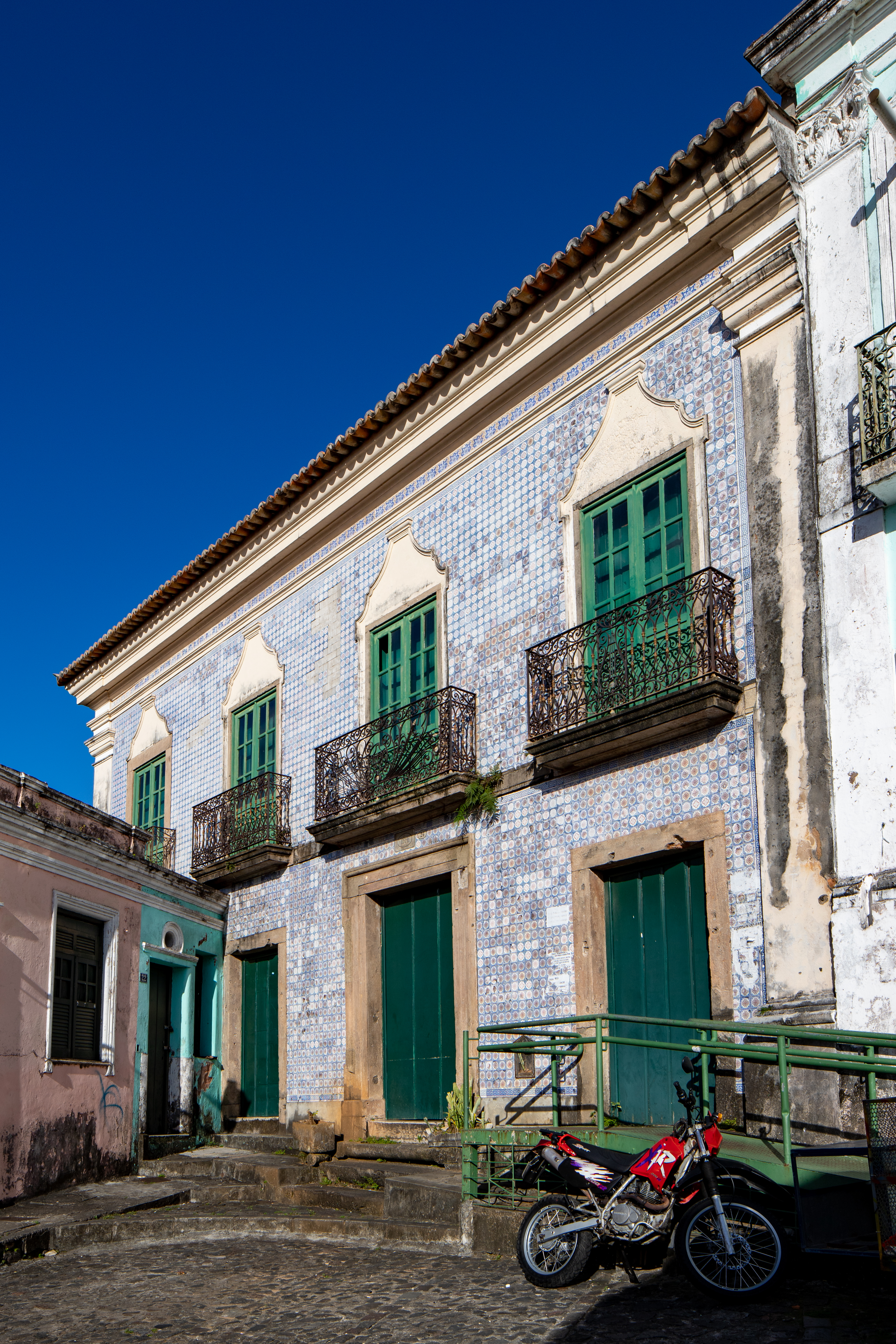
- House of the Seven Deaths (Casa das Sete Mortes)

- Location within Brazil
- Alternative names: Casa das Sete Facadas

General information
- Location: Rua Ribeiro Dos Santos, 24, Santo Antônio Além do Carmo, Salvador, Bahia, Brazil
- Coordinates: 12.970389°S 38.508944°W
- Inaugurated: 1600s
- Owner: Casa Pia and College of the Orphans of Saint Joachim

Technical details
- Floor count: 3

National Historic Heritage of Brazil
- Designated: 1943
- Reference no.: 283

The House of the Seven Deaths (Portuguese: Casa das Sete Mortes) or House of Seven Knifings (Portuguese: Casa das Sete Facadas) is a historic residence in Salvador, Bahia, Brazil. It was constructed in the early 1600s and is located within the Historic Center of Salvador. The house is named after a murder of four individuals at the residence in 1755, despite including the designation "seven". The House of Seven Death now functions as a school and was listed as a historic structure by the National Historic and Artistic Heritage Institute (IPHAN) in 1943.

== Location ==
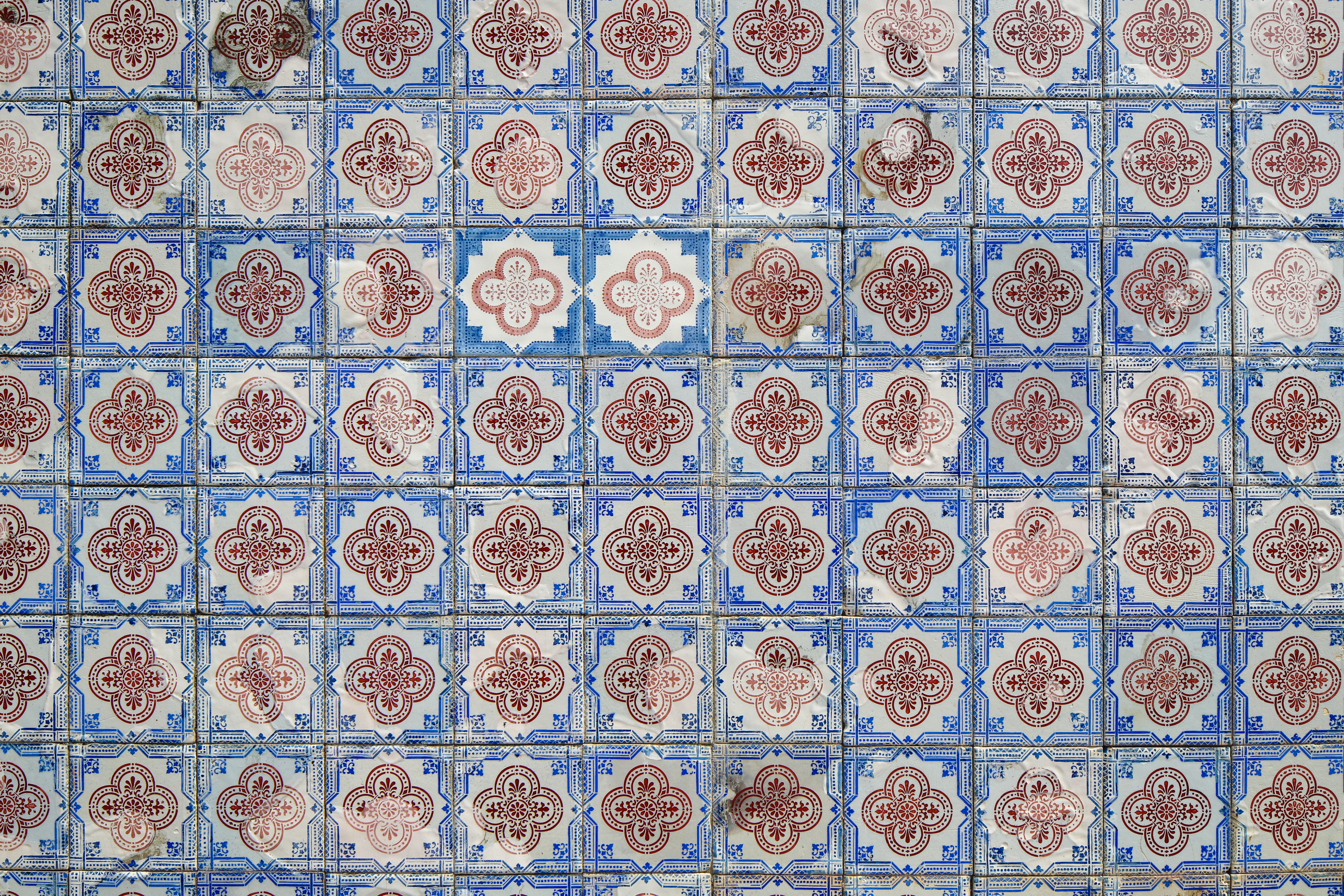
Detail of exterior tiles

The House of the Seven Deaths is located in the Santo Antônio Além do Carmo neighborhood, at the bend in Rua do Passo, a street that runs north to Church and Convent of Our Lady of Mount Carmel (Igreja e Convento de Nossa Senhora do Carmo). It, and all its adjacent structures, are closely aligned to the street. Only a small portion of the house is visible from the street, the remainder being obscured by adjacent houses. It is now part of the Historic Center of Salvador, and a short distance from numerous other listed historic properties.

== History ==
The house was built in the 17th century for residential use. Its builder is unknown. The first recorded owner of the house was Father Manuel de Almeida, who owned the residence in the 18th century until his death by homicide in 1755. Four people were stabbed to death in the incident: Father Manuel de Almeida, two enslaved people, and a freed working man. The incident is noted in the records of the Appeals Court of Bahia, which remain in the Public Archive of Bahia. The murderer was never discovered, the building is called the House of Seven Deaths, despite only four being recorded by the Appeals Court.

Dona Catarina de Senna da Silva Marinho became the owner of the property in 1795. In the 19th century, Joaquim Esteves dos Santos became the owner and with his death in 1881, the property passed to his heirs. They subsequently donated it to Casa Pia and College of the Orphans of Saint Joachim in 1936. The house remains the property of Casa Pia, and was converted into a school. It was restored in 2010 under the direction of the architect Adolfo Roriz.

== Structure ==
The house is a mixture of Portuguese, Spanish, and Moorish architecture. It is built around a courtyard with galleries, which provide ventilation to the house. It has two floors and an attic. Its external structure is made of masonry, and the main façade is covered with azulejos produced in Portugal in the 19th century. Similar azulejos on the exterior of a residence can be found at the Casa de Azulejo in the Saúde neighborhood. There are three portals on the first floor and four windows above in the Dona Maria I style, with ornamentation and balconets. The foyer is lined with 19th-century English tiles.

The internal courtyard is lined with 17th-century tiles and marble floors. Some of the panels of azulejos remain, complete with their borders. The house had a bath-house that opened to the internal courtyard. It featured a bathtub with inlaid fragments of shells.

== Protected status ==
The House of the Seven Deaths was listed as a historic structure by the National Institute of Historic and Artistic Heritage in 1943 under inscription number 283.

== Access ==
The House of the Seven Deaths is not open to the public and may not be visited.
