= House of the Seven Lamps =

- Casa dos Sete Candeeiros
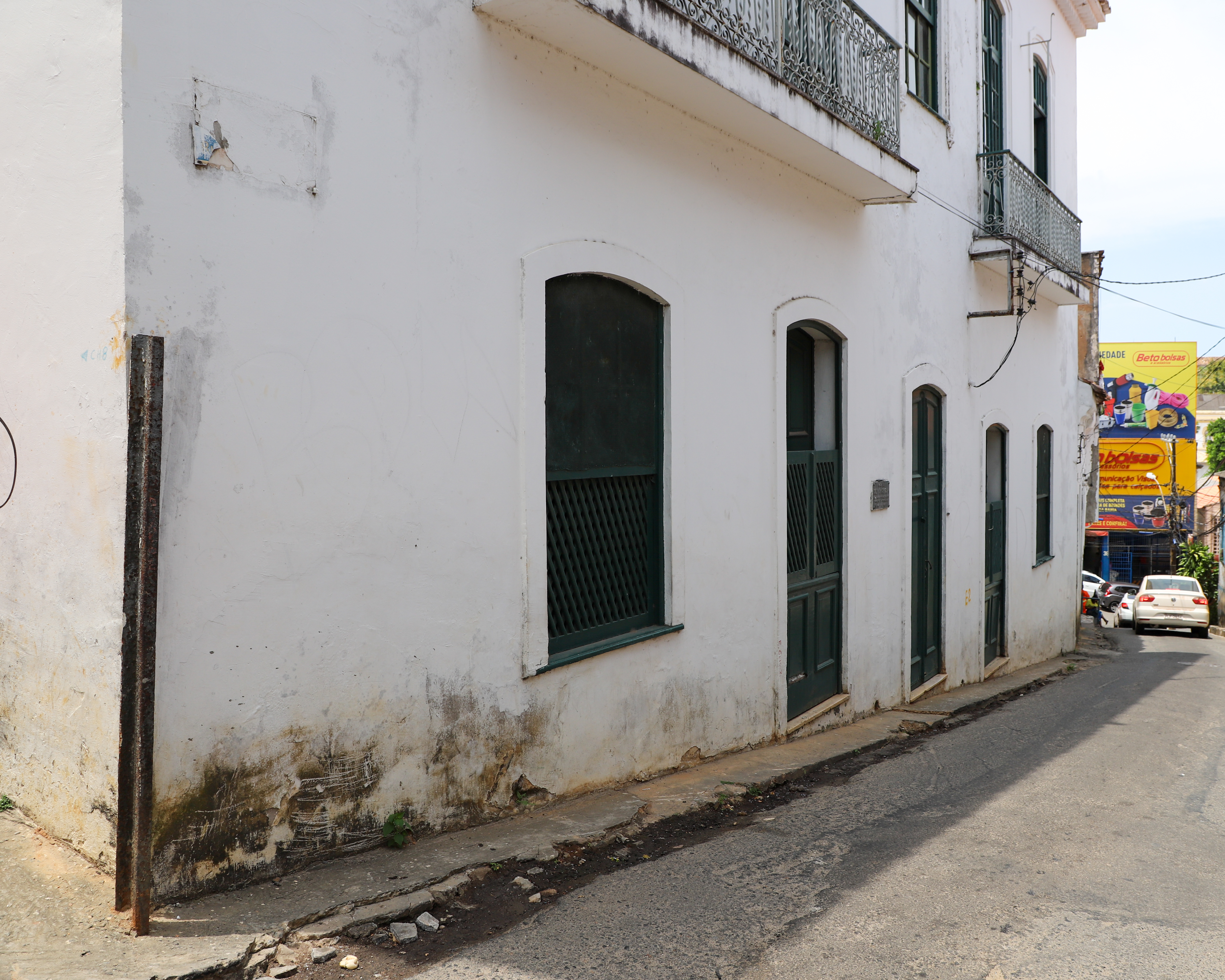

- Location within Brazil
- Alternative names: Casa dos Sete Candeeiros Museum

General information
- Type: Museum
- Location: Salvador, Bahia, Brazil
- Coordinates: 12.975883°S 38.511763°W
- Groundbreaking: 17th century
- Renovated: 2011
- Renovation cost: R$1.5 million
- Owner: National Institute of Historic and Artistic Heritage in Bahia (IPHAN-BA)

Technical details
- Floor area: 2

National Historic Heritage of Brazil
- Designated: 1938
- Reference no.: 124

The House of the Seven Lamps (Portuguese: Casa dos Sete Candeeiros) is a residence and museum in Salvador, Bahia, Brazil. It was constructed in the 17th century and is located on Rua de São Francisco at the south of the Pelourinho, or the Historic Center of Salvador. After a renovation between 2011 and 2013 it was reopened at the Casa dos Sete Candeeiros Museum.

== History ==
The house was constructed by the Jesuits in the early 17th century. After their expulsion from Brazil in 1759 the house was auctioned and sold to the sea captain António Elias da Fonseca Galvão. Galvão received a noble title in 1768 and placed his coat of arms in stone over the doorway. The building was later owned by Antonio Correia Ximenes, a lawyer, in the late 18th century. Noblemen accompanying John VI of Portugal on his visit to Brazil stayed at the residence. Seven oil lamps (lampiões de azeite) were placed to light the passageway during this visit and gave the house its present name. It was later owned by Cândido Leão, a magistrate, and was purchased by the Santa Casa da Misericórdia in 1888.

The structured was purchased in 1951 by the federal government of Brazil and became the first headquarters of National Institute of Historic and Artistic Heritage in Bahia (IPHAN-BA). It was closed, remodeled, and reopened as a museum on May 15, 2013.

== Protected status ==
The House of the Seven Lamps was listed as a historic structure by the National Institute of Historic and Artistic Heritage in 1938 after inspection by the architect Lucio Costa.
