= Church and Convent of São Francisco, Salvador =

Church in Bahia, Brazil

São Francisco Church and Convent of Salvador
- Convento e Igreja de São Francisco
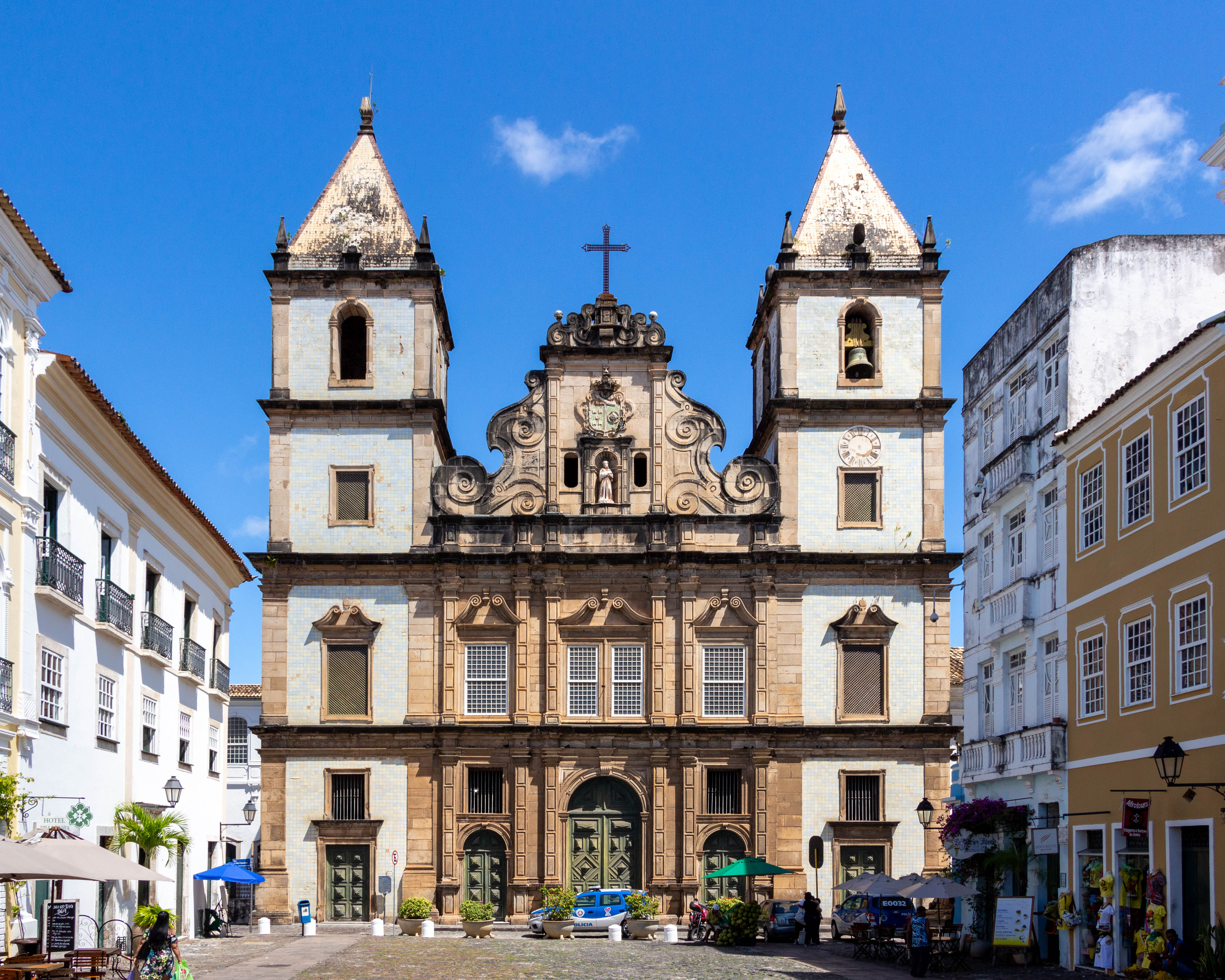
- Façade of the São Francisco Church

- Location of the Catedral Basílica de Salvador

Religion
- Affiliation: Catholic
- Rite: Roman Rite

Location
- Municipality: Salvador
- State: Bahia
- Country: Brazil
- Coordinates: 12.9746°S 38.5091°W

Architecture
- Direction of façade: Northwest

National Historic Heritage of Brazil
- Designated: 1938
- Reference no.: 86

The São Francisco Church and Convent (Portuguese: Igreja e Convento de São Francisco) is located in the Historic Center of Salvador, in the State of Bahia, Brazil. The ornate Church of the Third Order of Saint Francis sits adjacent to the convent. The friars of the Franciscan Order arrived in Salvador in 1587 and constructed a convent and church on the site. This structure was destroyed by the Dutch during the Dutch invasions of Bahia in the next century; Father Vicente das Chagas initiated the current structure in 1686, which was completed in the 18th century. The Franciscan church and convent have the largest number of azulejos, 55,000, of any church in Latin America.

The convent and its church are important colonial monuments in Brazil. It was listed as a historic structure by the National Institute of Historic and Artistic Heritage in 1938. The convent, church, and the adjacent Church of the Third Order are one of the Seven Wonders of Portuguese Origin in the World and form integral parts of the UNESCO World Heritage Site Historic Center of Salvador.

== History ==
The friars of the Franciscan Order arrived in Salvador in 1587 at the invitation of Dom Antônio Muniz Barreiros, third Bishop of Bahia. Their arrival in Bahia followed that of the Jesuits, who arrived with Tomé de Sousa, Brazil's first governor-general, and constructed their college and chapel of the Jesuits in 1564. Friar Melchior de Santa Catarina, Custodian Priest of Olinda, sent an appeal in 1585 to Pope Sixtus V to establish a convent on the site. The Franciscans initially settled into various residences and chapels on the site of the present Franciscan church, convent, and Third Order church. Melchior de Santa Catarina sent Antônio da Ilha and Francisco de São Boaventura, Franciscan brothers, to Salvador the same year; construction of a convent began in 1587.

The Franciscans soon built a convent and church, but these were destroyed during the Dutch invasions of Bahia in the 17th century. The works on the current convent began in 1686 under Father Vicente das Chagas following a grandiose design that took decades to complete.

Construction of the present-day church and convent began in 1708, as evidenced by the placement of a foundation stone. The structure was completed in 1723. The interior was decorated by several artists during a great part of the 18th century. Most decoration of the church and convent were finished by 1755. The construction of the Church of the Third Order of Saint Francis, located immediately adjacent to the Franciscan church, was carried out in parallel between 1702 and 1870.

On February 5, 2025, one person died and five others were injured after the church ceiling collapsed.

== Structure ==
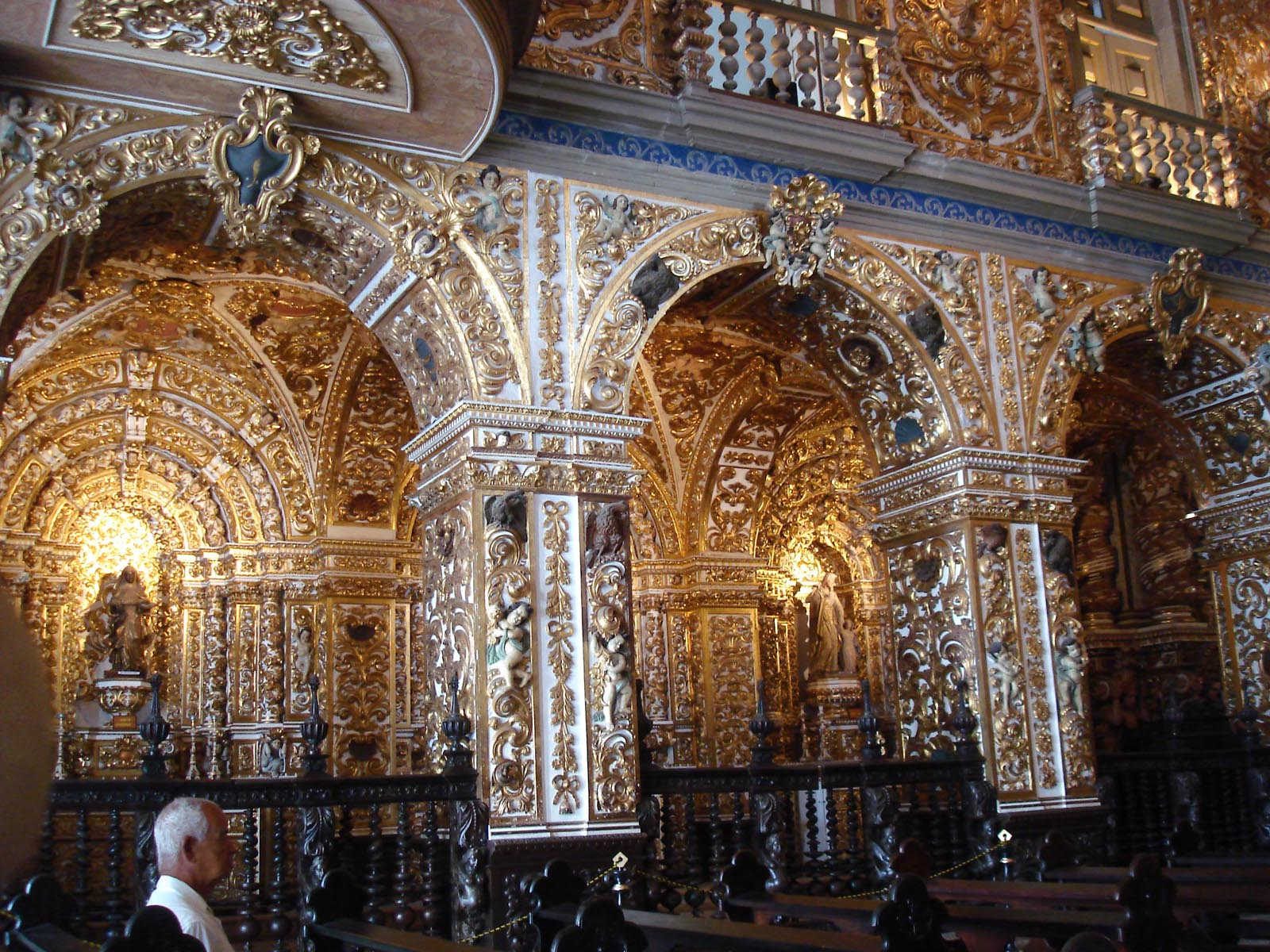
Nave of the church. Note the exuberant golden woodwork that cover all surfaces

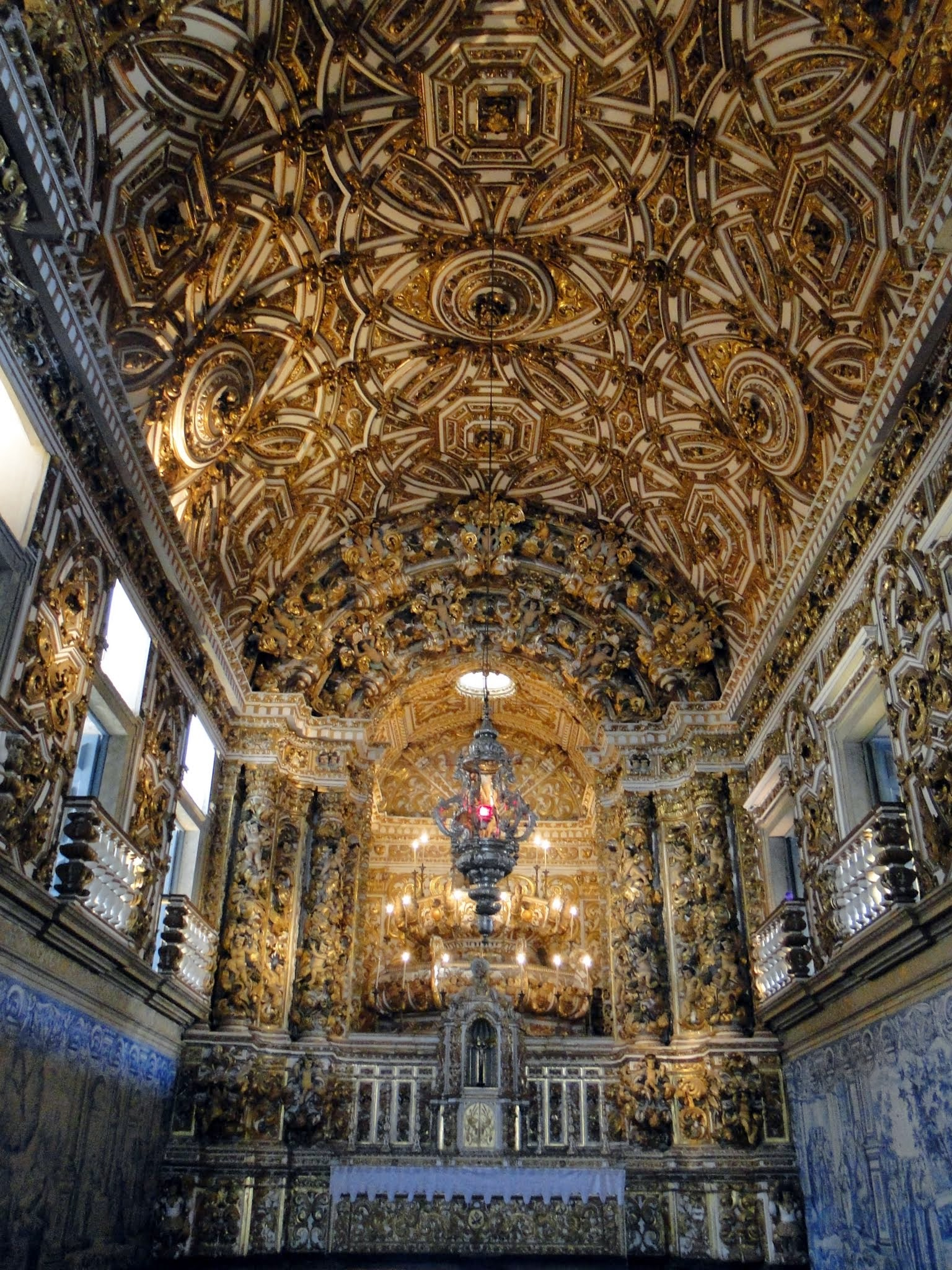
Interior of the church

The Church of São Francisco of Salvador is constructed of Bahian sandstone, including the walls, pilasters, and façade. Some sandstone existed on the Itapagipe Peninsula in the 18th century, but later sandstone elements were brought from Jaguaribe and Velha Boipeba in the interior of Bahia. The eight massive columns that support the choir are of Bahian sandstone and display clasts characteristic of sandstone the region. The use of local sandstone is in contrast to the extensive use of Portuguese lioz limestone used in the Cathedral Basilica of Salvador and the Church of Nossa Senhora da Conceição da Praia, now the Basilica of the Immaculate Conception.

The Church of São Francisco of Salvador is unusual among Franciscan houses of Northeast Brazil in that it has a nave with three aisles, while most other Franciscan churches of the region have only one aisle. Three lateral chapels are located on each of the lateral aisles. The church has a rectangular shape without protruding transept arms and a main chapel. The floorplan seems influenced by the São Francisco Church of Oporto (actually a Gothic building) and the Jesuit plans of São Roque in Lisbon and the Jesuit Church of Salvador. The church consists of a nave and chancel; transept; choir; lateral corridors; a vestibule which serves as an entrance; a sala do capítulo, a large cloister; which serves as a meeting room for the order; sacristy; library; and numerous rooms that serve the convent.

=== Façade ===
The main façade faces a large rectangular square, the Largo do Cruzeiro, with a large stone cross. The façade shows influences of Mannerist architecture through the Jesuit Church of Salvador, among other buildings. Sandstone from the Boa Viagem quarry, located on the Itapagipe Peninsula, was used for the façade. The quarry was a donation to the Franciscan fathers. Like the Cathedral of Salvador, it has three portals and two flanking bell towers. The upper part of the façade (gable) is flanked by elaborate volutes. The center of the monumental pediment has a statue of Saint Francis of Assisi in white marble. It is now covered in layers of paint and placed in the niche at the end of the first half of the 18th century. A relief of the coats of arms of the Franciscan Order is placed above the statue. The smooth tiles covering the towers are also from a later period and serve further to accentuate the main body of the façade was originally in dark sandstone. Tiles were added at a later period "to accentuate the main body of the façade".

=== Cruzeiro de São Francisco ===
A large cross in lioz marble, imported from Lisbon, sits in the broad square in front of the church. A large cross (Portuguese: cruzeiro) was common to Franciscan churches in Brazil; it demarcated the sacred space of an urban area. The cruzeiro of the São Francisco Church stands 8 metres (26 ft) on a square base of 5.5 metres (18 ft) by 5.5 metres (18 ft). The cross is dated 1807 and has an inscription Latin. The square in front of the São Francisco Church is now named for the cross, and is known as the Largo do Cruzeiro de São Francisco. Despite its location in a public space, the cruzeiro belongs to the Third Order of Saint Francis of Salvador.

=== Chancel and nave ===
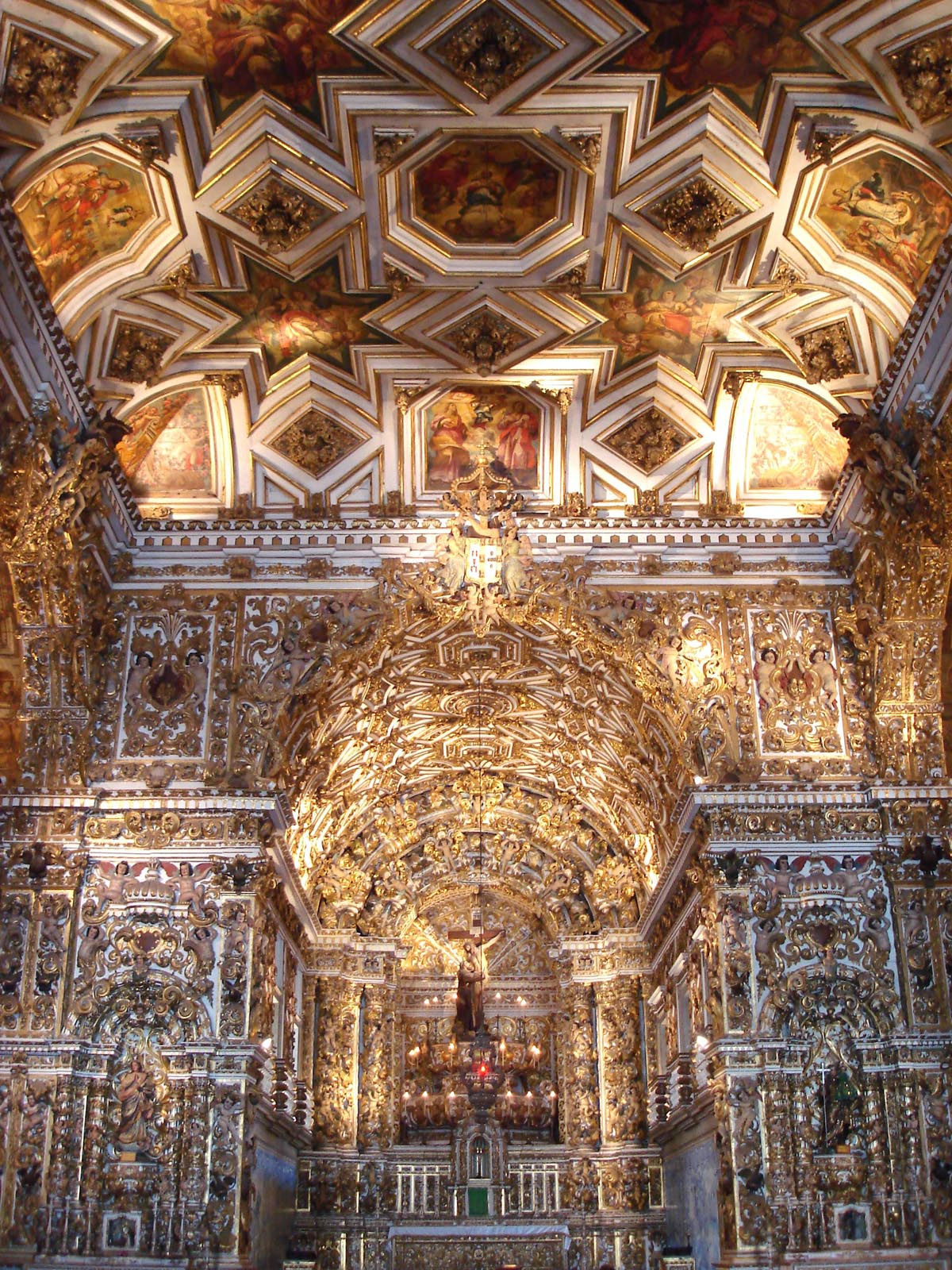
Crossing and main chapel of the church. Note the wooden panels with paintings on the ceiling.

The most important characteristic of the church is its exuberant inner decoration, mostly executed in the first half of the 18th century. All interior surfaces—walls, pillars, vaults and ceilings—are covered by golden sculpted gilt woodwork and paintings. The altarpieces have Solomonic columns and concentric arches decorated with golden foliage, angels, and birds. The vaults of the aisles are covered by wooden panels with paintings. Of particular note are the carvings of eight massive Atlanteans support the lateral altars.

Blue-white tile (azulejo) panels, by Bartolomeu Antunes de Jesus and imported from Lisbon, cover the lower parts of the walls of the main chapel and transept and depict scenes of the life of St Francis of Assisi. The decoration of the church is considered one of the most complete and imposing in Portuguese-Brazilian Baroque gilt woodwork art (talha dourada), being a perfect example of the "golden church" (igreja dourada).

The convent of São Francisco is also an important repository of Baroque art. The wooden ceiling of the entrance hall (portaria) was painted with scenes in illusionistic perspective by José Joaquim da Rocha in 1774.

Two holy water fonts are located below the choir level at the center of the nave. They are of brecha Arrábida, a multicolor limestone from Portugal of variegated in color but predominantly reddish brown, and were a gift from King John V of Portugal. Brecha Arrábida was also used on the columns and altars of the Monastery of Jesus of Setúbal.

=== Cloister ===
The cloister of the São Francisco Church and Convent was constructed between 1707 and 1752. It consists of two stories. Stone was ordered from Boipeba Island in present-day Cairu, Bahia, to construct the cloister by Frei Alvaro da Conceição. The cloister is circled by arches supported by stone columns, and its walkways provided shade from the harsh climate of Brazil. It served as a place for private meditation, community gatherings, interior processions; in contrast to the public use of the church.

A monumental set of blue-and-white azulejo tile panels were placed around the entirety of the cloister in the final period of construction. Of the approximately 50,000 azulejos in the church and convent, 35,000 are used in the cloister. The azulejos, like lioz marble, was carried to Brazil in the ballast of Portuguese ships. The azulejos were produced in Portugal by an unknown artist. They are sometimes attributed to Bartolomeu Antunes da Jesus, but differ greatly from his other works. Thijs Weststeijn attributes them to a Portuguese team of artist working in the Netherlands, likely in Delft.

The artwork of the azulejos were inspired by the work of the Flemish artist Otto van Veen, also known as Octavius Vaenius (c.1556 – 6 May 1629), print in the emblem book Quinti Horati Flacci Emblemata, first published in 1607. Some panels correspond directly to prints in the book. The panels of azulejos, 37 in number, depict mythological scenes with moralistic allegories by the Roman poet Horace. Each panel is surrounded by an ornate frame of flora, vases, and mascarons; each panels also a Latin inscription at its base. They variously depict citizens, soldiers, pagan gods, fauna, flora, European architecture, and putti. The azulejos were manufactured in Portugal, and arrived in Bahia between 1743 and 1746; their installation was completed in 1748.

=== Sacristy ===
The sacristy of the São Francisco Church and Convent is located directly behind the high altar and is accessed via chapels to either side of the chancel. It has a massive sacristy cabinet with an altar at center and other carved Baroque furniture. The walls are covered in 17th-century Portuguese azulejos; the ceiling is elaborately coffered. The lavabo is in white and red lioz limestone with the motif of the Franciscan order at center, an image in the niche at top, and elaborate masks motifs at the two taps.

== Protected status ==
The São Francisco Church and Convent was listed as a historic structure by the National Institute of Historic and Artistic Heritage in 1938. The structure was registered under the Book of Historical Works, Inscription no. 1 and Book of Fine Arts, Inscription no. 11. The directive is dated March 31, 1938.

== Access ==
As of September 2026 the church is closed following a partial collapse of the roof on February 5, 2025 killing one person and injuring five people.

== Bibliography ==
- Thijs Weststeijn (2005). "Otto Vaenius' Emblemata Horatiana and the azulejos in the monastery of São Francisco in Salvador de Bahía". De Zeventiende Eeuw: Cultuur in de Nederlanden in Interdisciplinair Perspectief. 21: 125–145. ISSN 0921-142X.
