= Church da Ordem Terceira de São Francisco (Salvador) =

18th-century church in Bahia, Brazil

Church of the Third Order of Saint Francis
- Igreja da Ordem Terceira de São Francisco
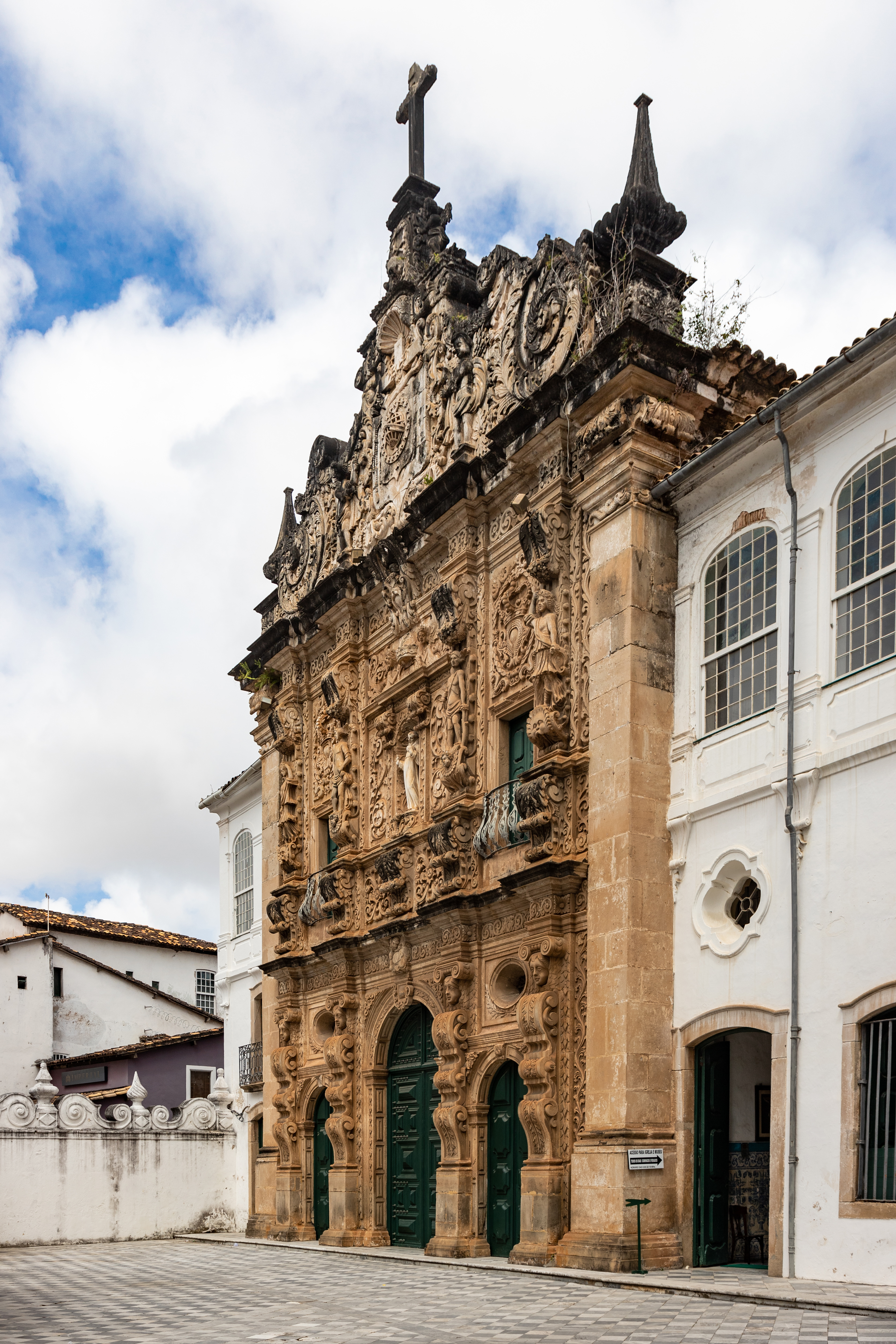
- Façade of the Church of the Third Order of Saint Francis

- Location of the Church of the Third Order of Saint Francis in Brazil

Religion
- Affiliation: Catholic
- Rite: Roman

Location
- Municipality: Salvador
- State: Bahia
- Country: Brazil
- Interactive map of Church of the Third Order of Saint Francis
- Coordinates: 12.974421°S 38.508821°W

Architecture
- Architect: Gabriel Ribeiro
- Type: Church
- Style: Plat

The Church of the Third Order of Saint Francis (Portuguese: Igreja da Ordem Terceira de São Francisco, also Igreja da Ordem Terceira de São Francisco da Penitência) is an 18th-century Roman Catholic church in Salvador, Bahia, Brazil, and seat of the Third Order of Saint Francis in Brazil. The church is one of the main elements of the Historic Center of Salvador and lies within the UNESCO World Heritage Site of the city. It was listed as a historic structure by National Institute of Historic and Artistic Heritage (IPHAN) in 1941. The church was constructed as an annex to the São Francisco Church and Convent. It is noted for its distinctive Plateresque-style façade, an example unique in Brazil. The writer Jorge Amado called the façade of the Third Order church "magnificent."

== History ==
The Order of the Third Order of San Francisco arrived in Bahia in 1635. The order erected its first church in 1644, which was demolished and replaced by the present structure. A competition was held for its design, and on December 18, 1701, the Fathers of the Third Order chose Gabriel Ribeiro (late 16th century – 1719), a native of Porto, Portugal. The cornerstone of the church was laid on January 1, 1702, and the structure was completed on June 22, 1703. The façade was completed in 1705, but its elaborate construction probably continued well into the 18th century.

The church was closed to the public and renovated in the late 1820s. The primitive interior of the church was replaced with Neoclassical elements. New altars were created in 1827 and 1828 by the master wood carver José de Cerqueira Torres. Torres was commissioned to complete 77 pieces, including candlesticks, crosses, bouquets and jars. Franco Velasco completed in the gilding in 1830. The ornate Plateresque façade was covered with a simple Neoclassical facade. The church is also noted for its azulejo tiles and jacaranda furniture, both from the 18th century.

Church of the Third Order of Saint Francis reopened to the public on July 5, 1935. Damião Barbosa de Araújo (1778–1856) composed a work for full orchestra for the dedication mass. Its score is now stored in the archive of the church.

Electricians carrying out renovations on the church in the 1932 discovered the original Baroque exterior of the church. The Neoclassical façade was removed and the granite Baroque exterior renovated in its present form in 1939. The church is also noted for its collection of roca saints, which are housed in a room completed in 1844.

== Structure ==
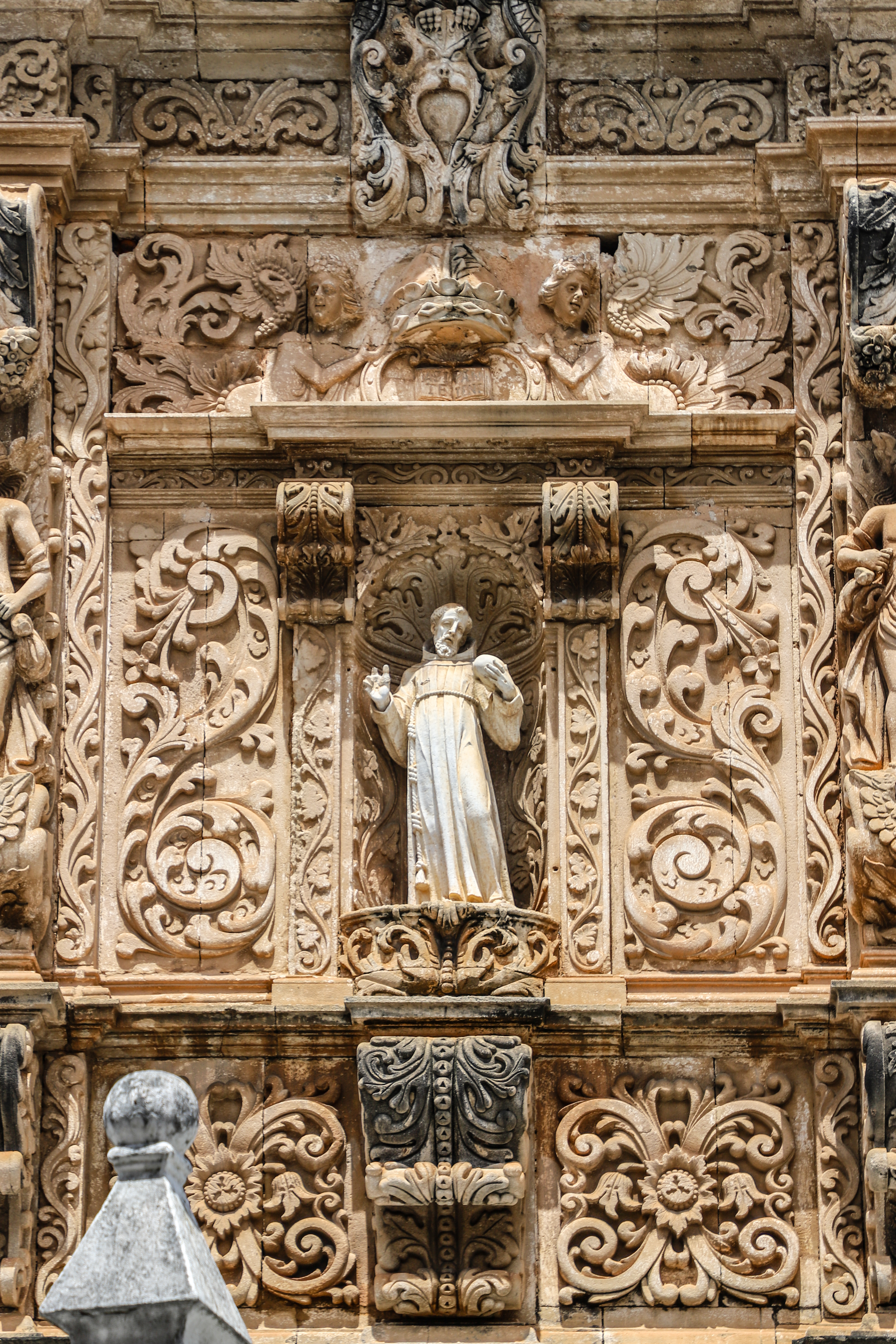
Detail of Plateresque-style façade

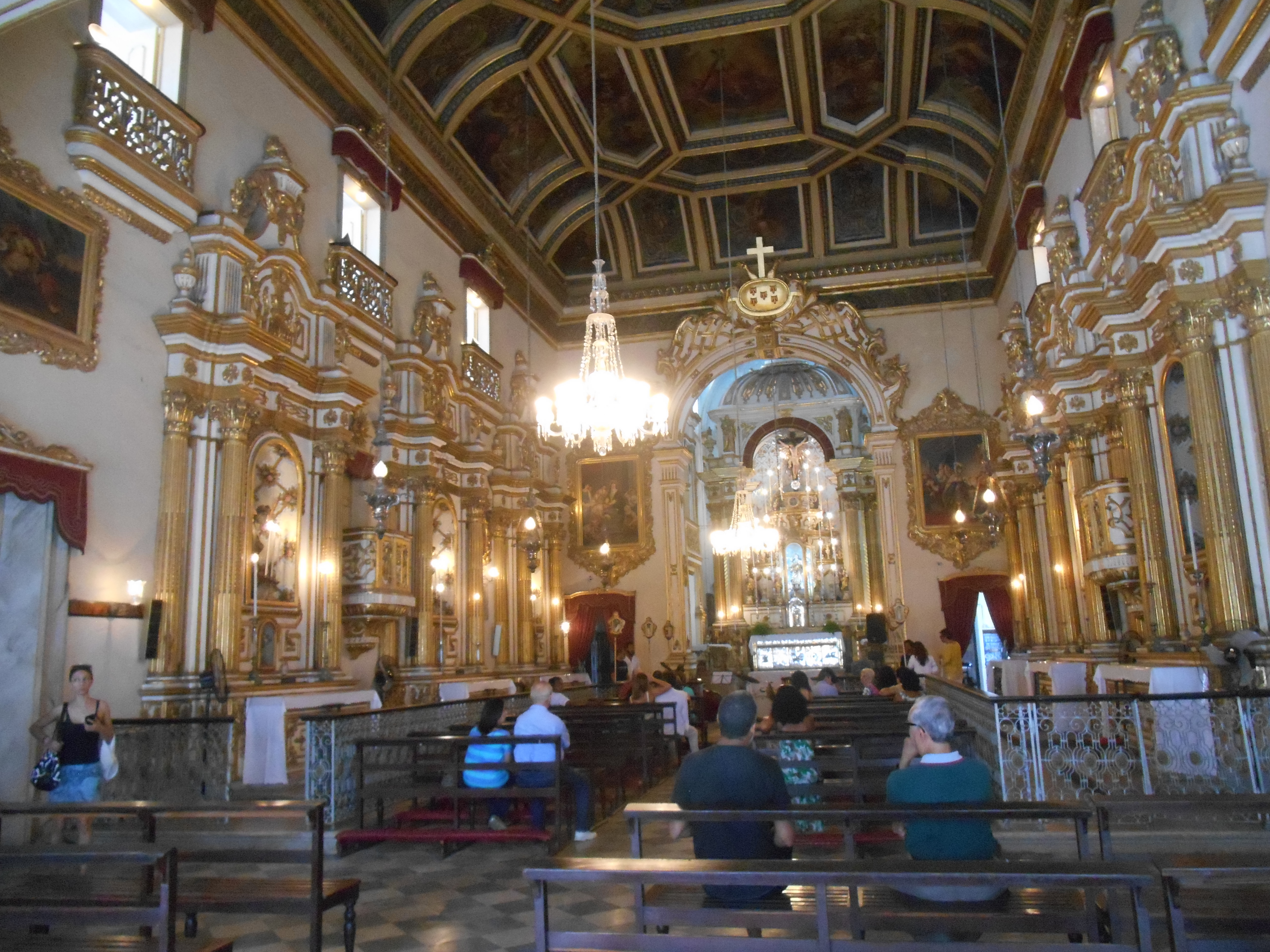
View of nave and chancel

Church of the Third Order of Saint Francis sits behind a small churchyard on Igreja da Ordem Terceira slightly removed from the Terreiro do Jesus. The churchyard features an iron fence and masonry pillars. The church consists of a complex featuring a nave with two side corridors surmounted by tribunes; a Room of Saints (Casa dos Santos) a large patio with galleys, a large sacristy behind the high altar. The entrance hall has a collection of paintings depicting the life of Saint Francis by Bento José Rufino Capinam (1791–1874). The Sala da Mesa, a large meeting room for the Brotherhood, is richly decorated with paintings and azulejos. Polychromatic lioz limestone was imported at great expense from Portugal and is utilized in the decorative flooring of the nave, chancel, and sacristy. The rear of the church leads to an ossuary at a lower level.

All parts of the church complex are decorated with azulejos, paintings, marble, and sculpture. The tribunes of the left wing are linked by galleries. The rich paintings on the ceiling of the nave were completed in 1831 by Franco Velasco (1780–1833). The sacristy is noted for its well-preserved azulejo tiles and marble lavabo. A sitting room is noted for its carved wooden altar.

The church has over 27,000 azulejos, noted for some of the only depictions of Lisbon prior to the earthquake of 1755. Azulejos in the church complex also depict the marriage of Prince José, later Joseph I of Portugal, and Mariana Victoria of Spain in 1729.

=== Façade ===
The richly decorated Plateresque-style façade is carved from limestone with sandstone elements. The nave is accessed via a richly decorated central portal with two side doors. A statue of Saint Francis of Assisi is in a niche at the upper center of the complex façade; it is likely of limestone imported from Portugal used in numerous churches in the same period. The uppermost section of the facade has the symbol of the skull, a symbol associated with Saint Francis, which represents death and the fragility of the human life to members of the Franciscan Order. Four figures are located at the level of the niche of Saint Francis. The outer figures are Caryatids, and those closest to the niche, with a naked chest and wings next to the head, are representation of Hermes. Two half figures are located above the niche; they have the upper part of the female body with acanthus leaves below. The female forms, which resemble mermaids, hold a crown with a cartela below inscribed in Latin, Agite panitant ("do penitence"), a reference to Matthew 3:2 or Matthew 4:17 (Poenitentiam agite).

=== Chancel ===
The chancel of the Third Order church has a vaulted ceiling with sash windows; unlike other chancels in Salvador, its ceiling is painted a simple blue with small decorative stars. The pavement of the chancel is richly decorated with lioz imported from Portugal; unlike other churches that feature pavements in strict geometric forms, it has curved tracing and irregular lines. The chancel arch is richly decorated in gilded woodcarving and has the Franciscan coat of arms at top.

=== Cloister ===
The cloister of the Church of the Third Order of Saint Francis is located to the south of the structure. It is smaller and simpler than the cloister of the adjacent São Francisco Church and Convent. It bounds the nave on one side and the São Francisco Church and Convent on the opposite side; the cloister of the corridor has a small entrance to the adjacent building. Its corridors are richly lined in azulejos, similarly to the cloister of the São Francisco Church; its columns are of local Bahian sandstone.

=== Casa dos Santos ===
The right (north) lateral corridor leads to a room to house the roça saints, called the Casa dos Santos, or room of saints. The room contains twenty-three niches, constructed in 1844, to house wood sculptures of saints. The processional saints, revered by the Franciscan order, and niches are the work of the master woodcarver Joaquim Francisco de Mattos.

=== Sacristy ===
The sacristy contains a large sacristy cabinet, lavabo, and richly lined with azulejo tiles. The lavabo is of marble and lioz limestone imported from Portugal; its design is of polychromatic inlay in white, red, light pink, and yellow lioz and black marble from Mem Martins. The center of the lavabo has an inlay coat of arms of the Franciscan Order with stylized birds to the left and right. The lavabo was imported from Macao in 1720; its design shows Portuguese, Arab, and Japanese influence.

== Protected status ==
Church of the Third Order of Saint Francis was listed as a historic structure by the National Historic and Artistic Heritage Institute in 1938. The structures were registered under the Book of Historical Works, Inscription no. 89.

== Access ==
The church is open to the public and may be visited.

== Bibliography ==
- Ana Palmira Bittencourt Santos Casimiro (1996), Mentalidade e estética na Bahia colonial: a venerável Ordem Terceira de São Francisco de Assis da Bahia e o frontispício da sua igreja (in Portuguese), Salvador: Secretaria da Cultura e Turismo do Estado da Bahia, Wikidata Q106367896
