= Historic Center of Salvador =

Historic Centre of Salvador de Bahia
UNESCO World Heritage Site
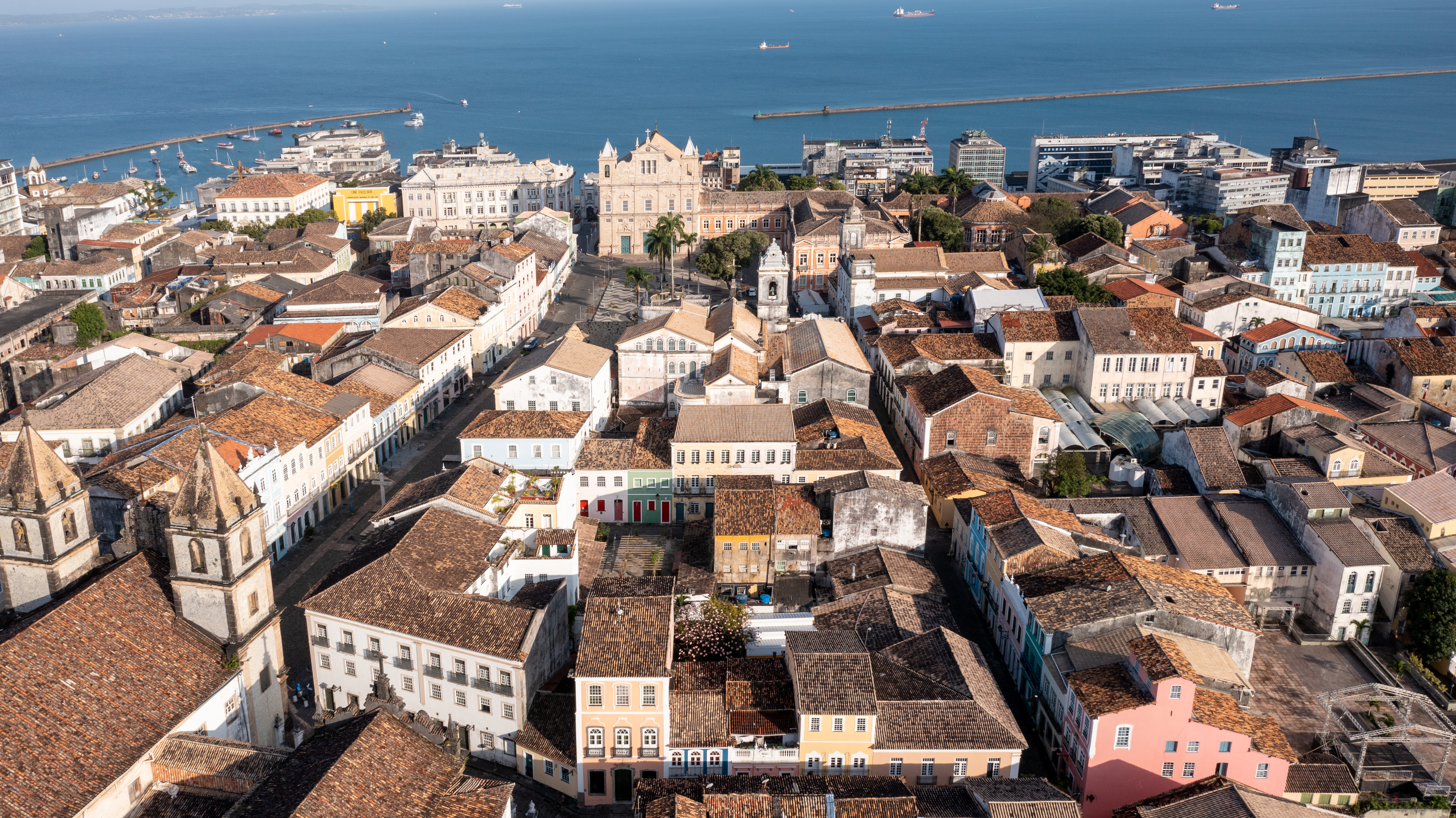

- Location within Brazil
- Location: Salvador, Bahia, Brazil
- Reference: 309
- Inscription: 1985 (9th Session)
- Coordinates: 12°58′S 38°30′W

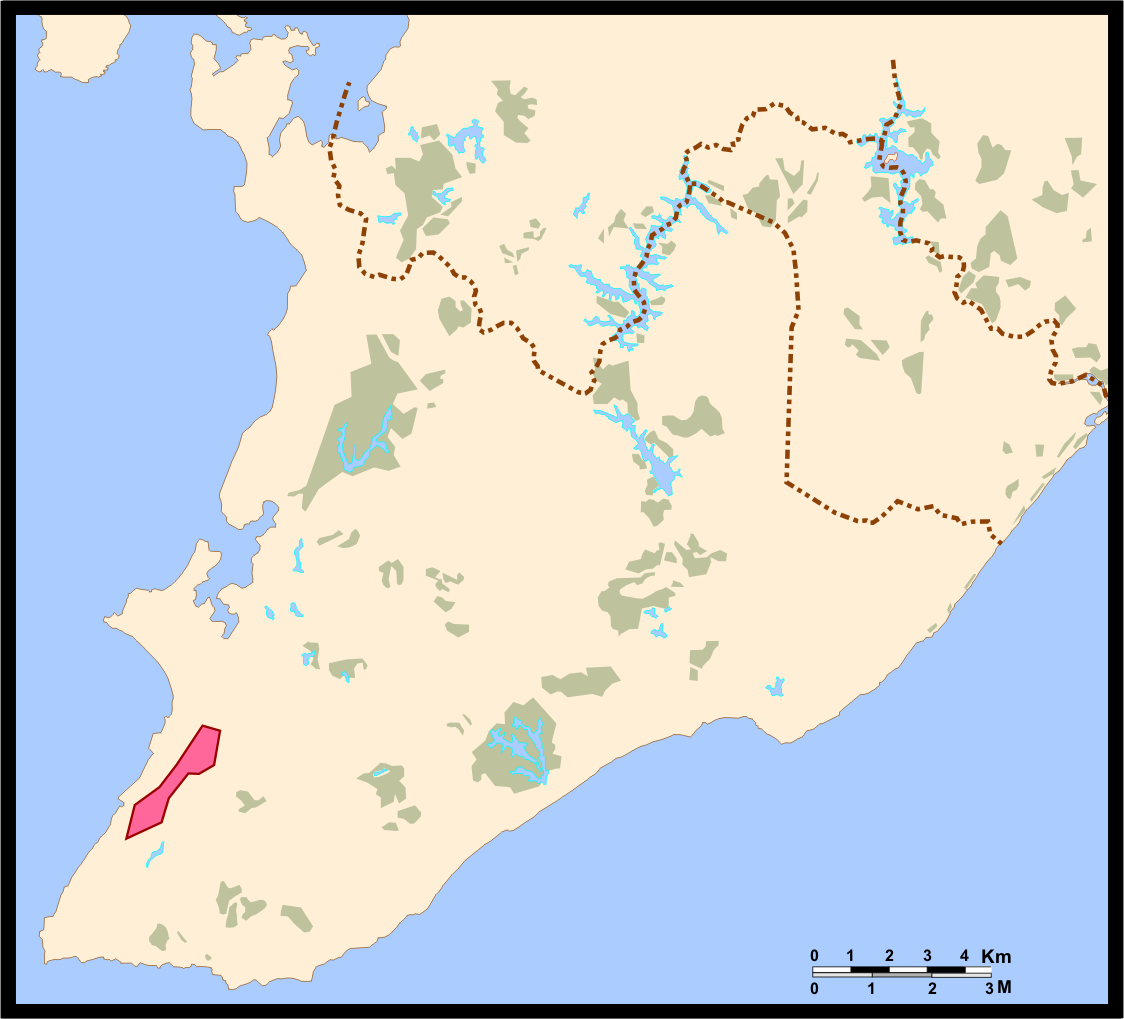
Location of Historic Center.

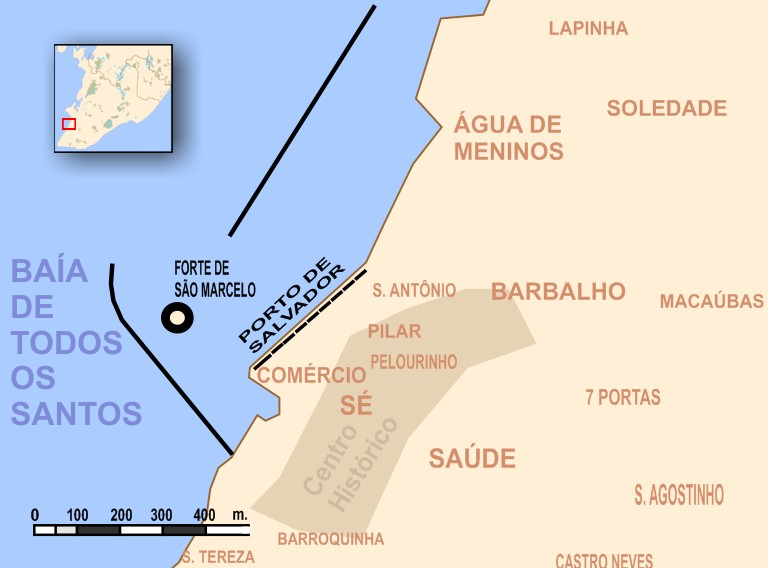
Historic Center and neighborhoods.

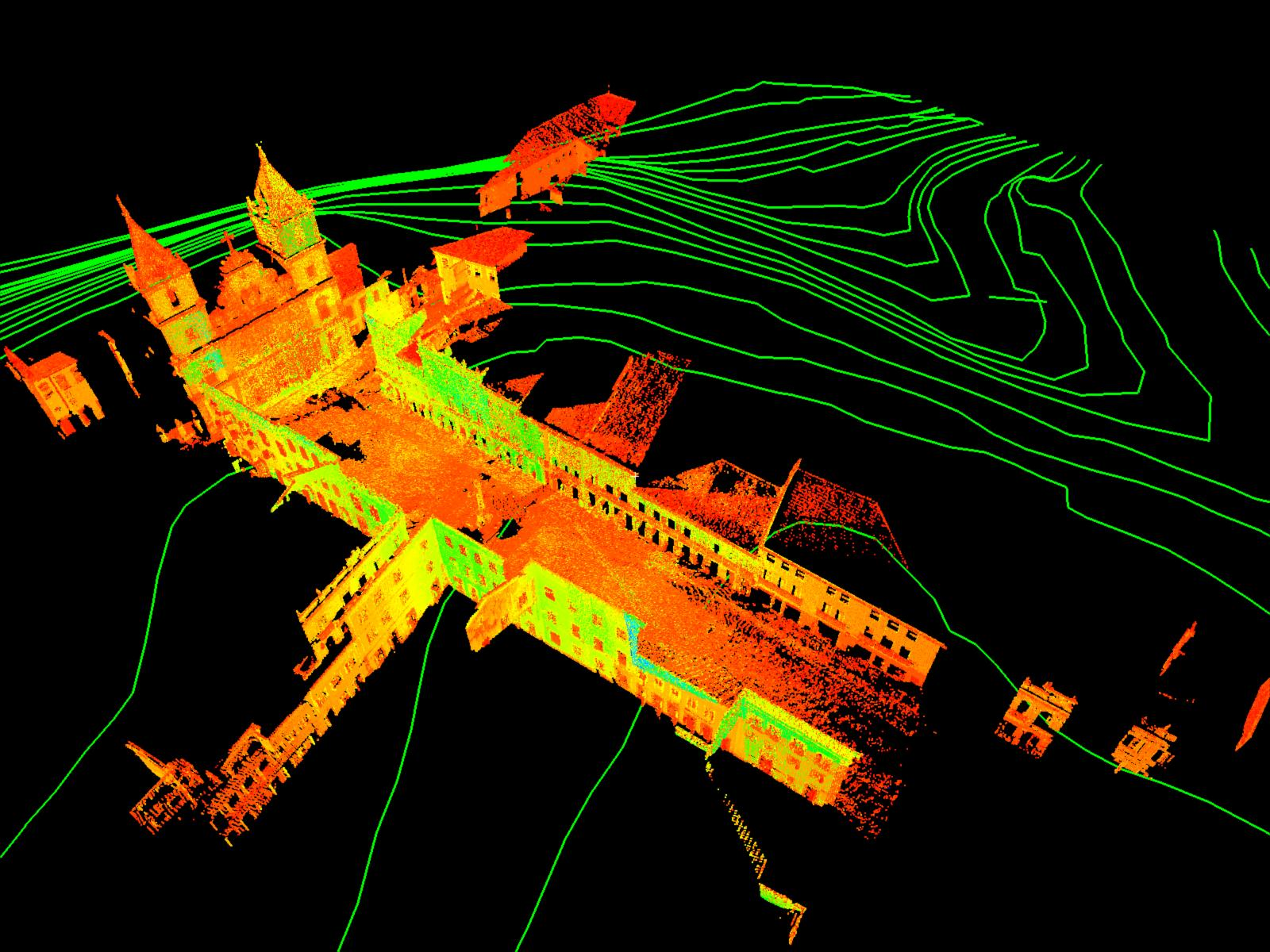
Isometric view of the Pelourinho's Anchieta Plaza, cut from a laser scan preservationist project conducted by nonprofit CyArk.

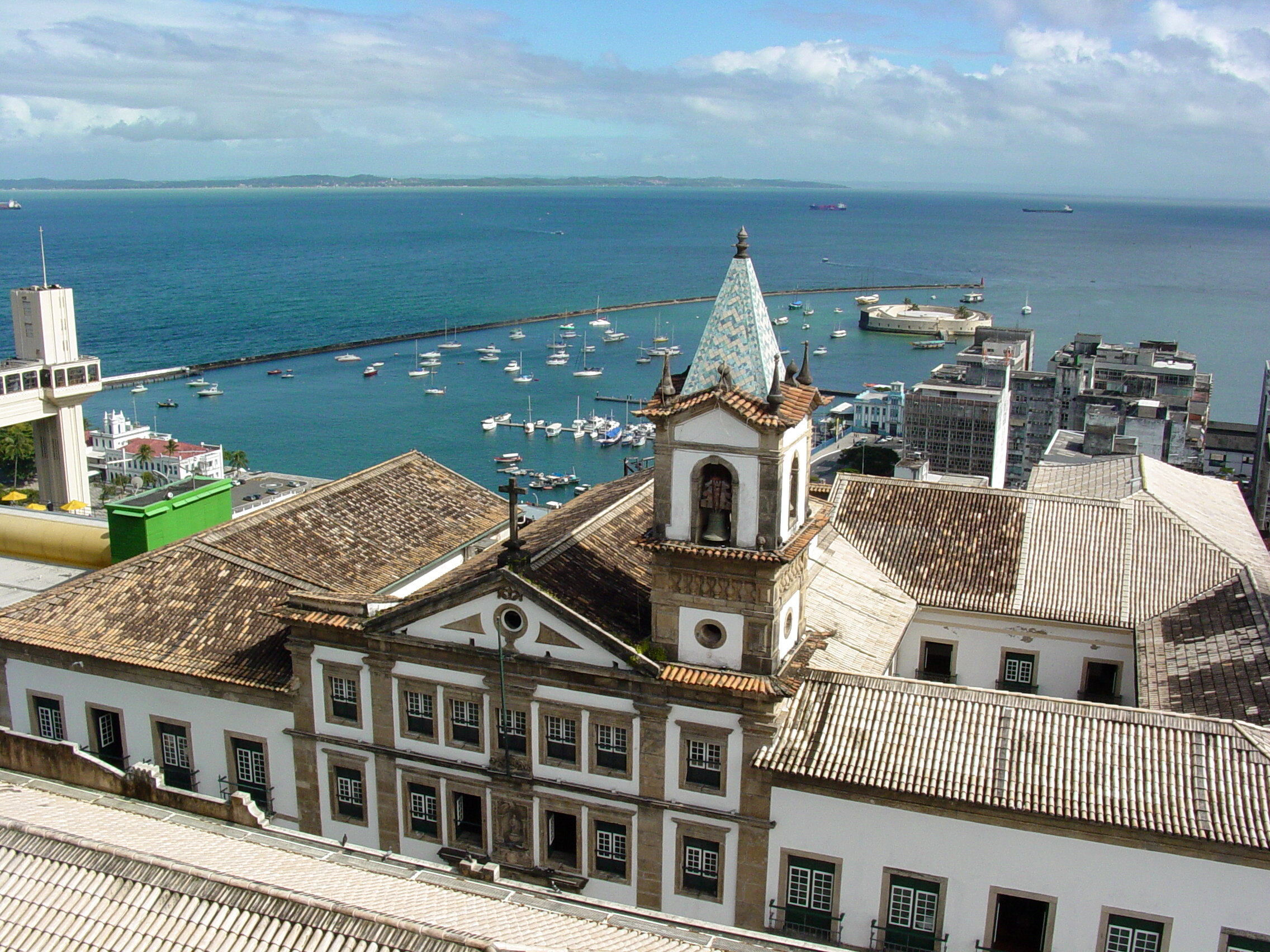
View over harbor area and Old Customs House.

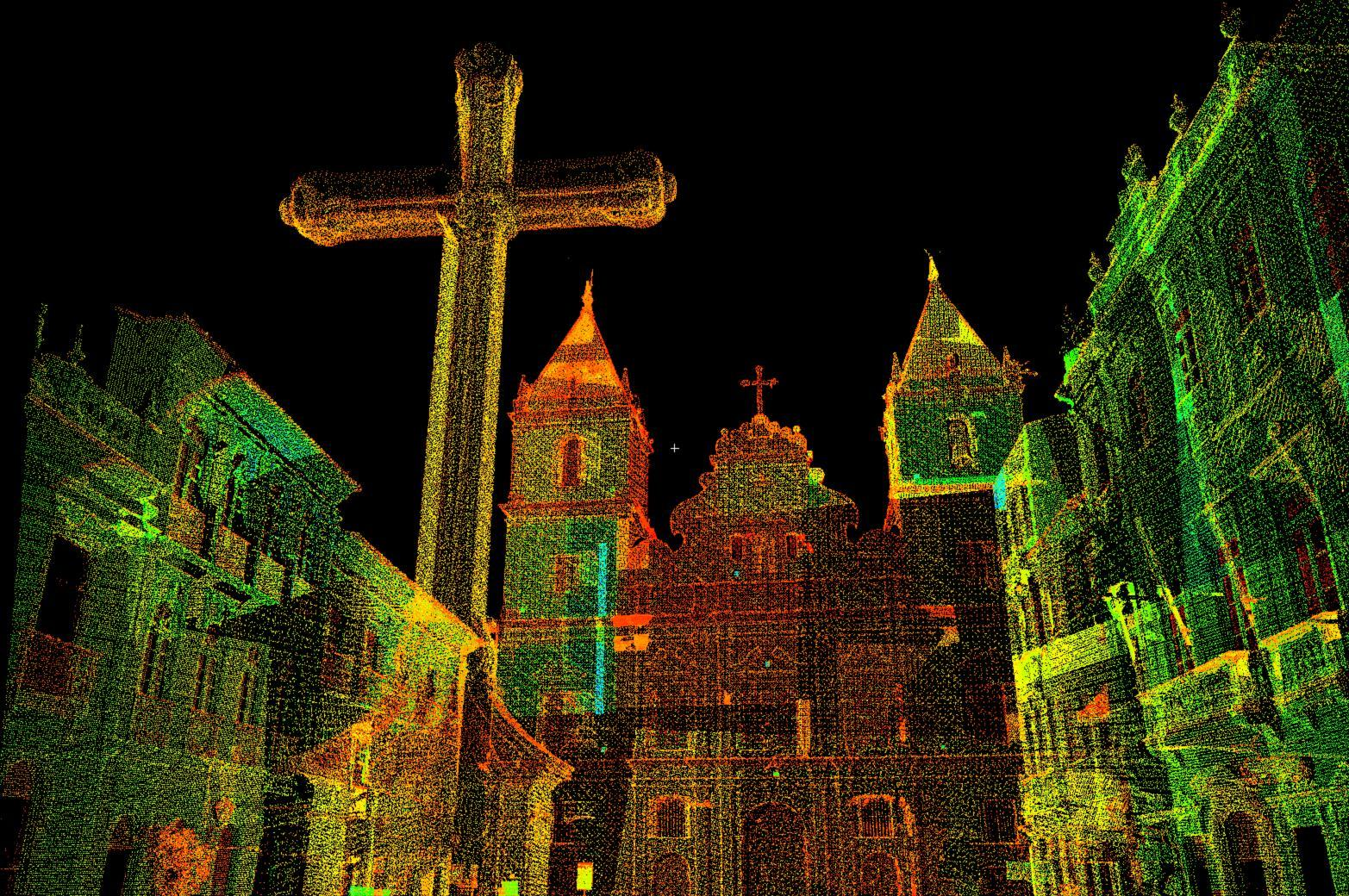
Perspective of the Cross and Church of São Francisco in Anchieta Plaza, Pelourinho, created from a laser scan preservationist project conducted by nonprofit CyArk.

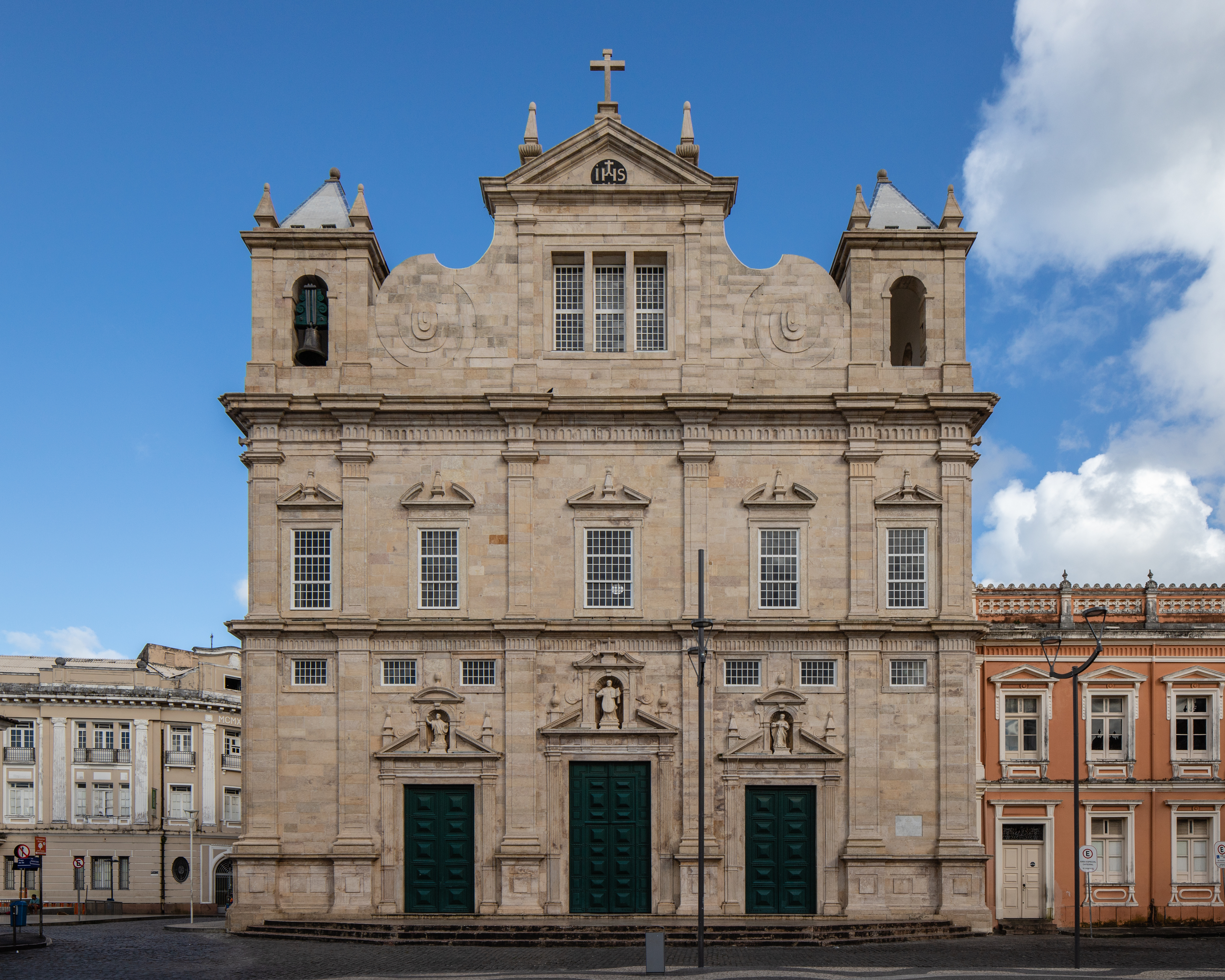
Mannerist Colonial Primate Cathedral Basilica of Salvador

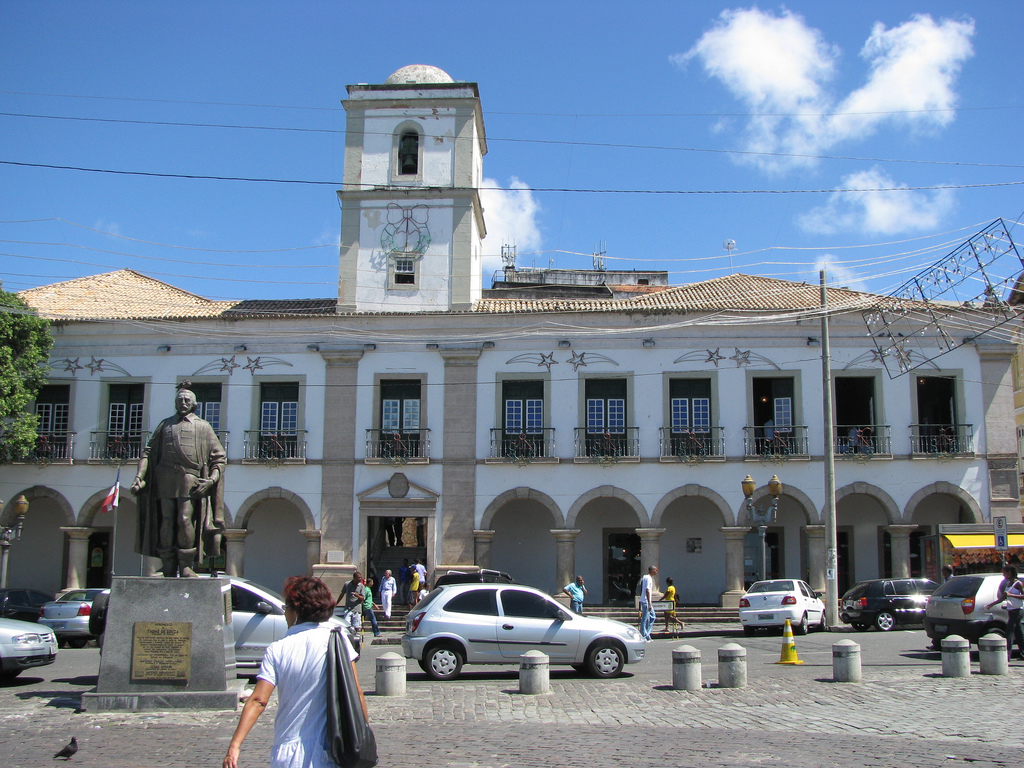
17th-century colonial governmental building (Câmara) of Salvador.

The Historic Center (US) or Centre (UK) (Portuguese: Centro Histórico) of Salvador de Bahia in Brazil, also known as the Pelourinho (Portuguese for "Pillory") or Pelô, is a historic neighborhood in western Salvador, Bahia. It was the city's center during the Portuguese colonial period and was named for the whipping post in its central plaza where enslaved people from Africa were publicly beaten as punishment for alleged infractions. The Historic Center is extremely rich in historical monuments dating from the 17th through the 19th centuries.

Designated a UNESCO World Heritage Site, the Largo do Pelourinho retains a vibrant repertoire of colonial Portuguese architecture, exemplified by the Mannerist decoration of the Cathedral of Salvador, the Baroque intricacy of the Church and Convent of São Francisco and the Church of the Third Order of Our Lady of the Rosary of the Black People. In addition, the Pelourinho remains a cultural hub for the Afro-Brazilian community, whose cuisine, architecture, religion and music exert a salient influence on the neighborhood and testify to the "empowerment and influence of Afro cultures" in the New World. Although historical preservation efforts initiated in the 1990s enhanced safety, promoted tourism and facilitated greater economic development, they also resulted in the dislocation of Afro-Brazilian residents in the enclave and contributed to gentrification. As such, the development of the Pelourinho continues to attract attention in the gubernatorial politics of Bahia.

== History ==
The Church of the Holy See (Igreja da Sé), an integral part of the architectural set of the Historic Center, was demolished in 1933 along with four other blocks of buildings from the colonial and imperial periods. The Archbishop's Palace, connected to the church, remains. Debates over the destruction of historic sites in Salvador and elsewhere in Brazil led to the first attempts at federal-level protection of historic assets and eventually to the establishment of the National Institute of Historic and Artistic Heritage.

The Terreiro de Jesus, just north of Praça Municipal, is home to structures from the 17th to 19th century constructions. Catedral Basilica, former Igreja dos Jesuítas (Jesuit Church), and churches Ordem Terceira de São Domingos and Church of Saint Peter of the Clergymen (São Pedro dos Clérigos) stand out in Terreiro de Jesus, with its water fountain in the center.

The former Medical School Building, originally occupied by the Jesuit School, is now the Memorial da Medicina (Medicine Memorial), Arqueologia e Etnologia (Archeology and Ethnology), and Afro-Brasileiro (Afro-Brazilian) museums. The House of the Seven Lamps (Casa dos Sete Candeeiros), now a museum, is nearby. Largo do Cruzeiro de São Francisco (Cruzeiro de São Francisco Largo), practically an extension of Terreiro de Jesus, has an old cross in the center, and, on the back, the monumental religious set made up of São Franscisco Church and Convent, and Church of the Third Order of Saint Francis (Ordem Terceira de São Franscisco Church). The Church of the Third Order of Our Lady of the Rosary of the Black People (Igreja da Ordem Terceira de Nossa Senhora do Rosário dos Pretos), Church of the Blessed Sacrament at Rua do Passo, and Church of the Third Order of Mount Carmel are located further north in the district. Numerous colonial-period historic residences, including the Palace of Saldanha and House of the Seven Deaths, are located on streets outside of the main plazas.

Many buildings of the Historic Center have been renovated since the initial survey of Salvador by the National Institute of Historic and Artistic Heritage in the 1930s. This work extended to the revitalization of whole blocks of historic houses, convents, and churches from the beginning of the 1990s. There are more than 800 buildings with restored façades and interiors; many were adapted to function as small museums and cultural centers.

== Protected status ==
The Historic Center of Salvador as a whole was listed as a national heritage site by the National Institute of Historic and Artistic Heritage in 1984. It was named a UNESCO World Heritage Site by UNESCO in 1985.

== See also ==
- São Pedro Clock
- Dom Pedro II Home
