= Sobrado Azulejado =

Mansion in Brazil

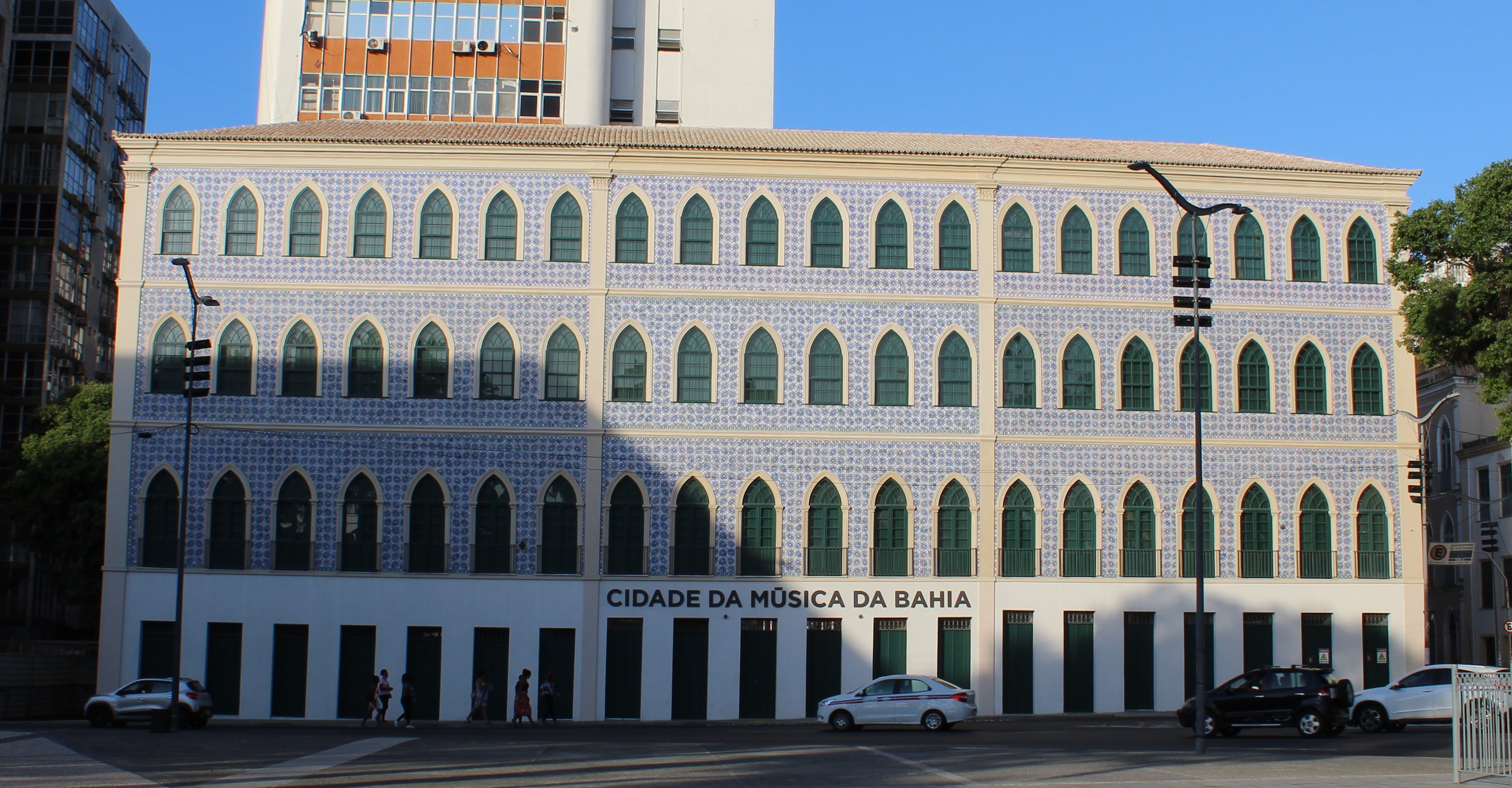
- Façade of Sobrado Azulejado after restoration

- Location within Brazil

General information
- Architectural style: Eclectic style
- Location: Salvador, Bahia, Brazil
- Coordinates: 12.973086°S 38.513235°W
- Estimated completion: Late 19th century

Technical details
- Floor count: 4
- Floor area: 463.51 square metres (4,989.2 ft^{2})

National Historic Heritage of Brazil
- Designated: 1969
- Reference no.: 717

The Sobrado Azulejado, also known as the Sobrado de Azulejos, is a late 19th-century commercial building in Salvador, Bahia, Brazil. It is located in the Comércio district on Praça Cayru, a public square, and close to the Mercado Modelo public market. The house is entirely glazed in azulejo, a tin-glazed ceramic tile; all of the tiles of the sobrado were manufactured in Portugal. The structure was listed as a national heritage site by the National Institute of Historic and Artistic Heritage (IPHAN) in 1969. Udo Knoff, a ceramics researcher, called the building "the most azulejo-tiled building" in Bahia.

== History ==
The Sobrado Azulejado was built at the end of the 19th century, dedicated to the business of the Port of Salvador. By 1935 it was home to the Urban Planning Office for the City of Salvador (EPUCS). The building was sold in June 1949 and EPUCS was relocated elsewhere in the city. By 1987 the owner of the building was listed as Abdala Gaid.

The Hilton hotel chain has attempted to build a hotel in the Comércio. A petition to the state government in 2015 requested the expropriation and demolition of Sobrado Azulejado and six other historic structures in the district for the construction of a high-rise hotel. The plan was supported by João Henrique Carneiro, governor of Bahia from 2005 to 2013. A compromise was reached that the hotel would demolish the all parts of the structure but retain and restore the façade. The status of the Hilton hotel plan went into limbo in 2013 as Carneiro left office coupled with subsequent litigation over the plan.

In 2015, the decree that made public property (first step for expropriation) published in the Official Gazette of the Municipality (DOM), seven properties in the region - including the sobrado - will be used as equipment for the Museum of Music and the Public Archive of City. The ownership of Sobrado Azulejado remained in litigation as of 2015; two unnamed owners claim the property and its status remains undetermined.

== Structure ==
The structure is of brick and consists of four floors with a tiled roof. It is built in the Eclectic style. The façade of the building is covered in blue and white azulejos manufactured in Portugal. The building has 20 doors and 70 windows and covers 463.51 square metres (4,989.2 ft^{2}). Each of the windows is framed in azulejos.

Restoration work was carried out on the Sobrado Azulejado between 1970 and 1973 to stabilize the building. The azulejo façade was preserved, but the interior of the building was significantly altered through the use of concrete slabs to stabilize the building. The building has steadily fallen into disrepair since the stabilization project. 60% of the roof collapsed in 2017.

== Azulejos ==
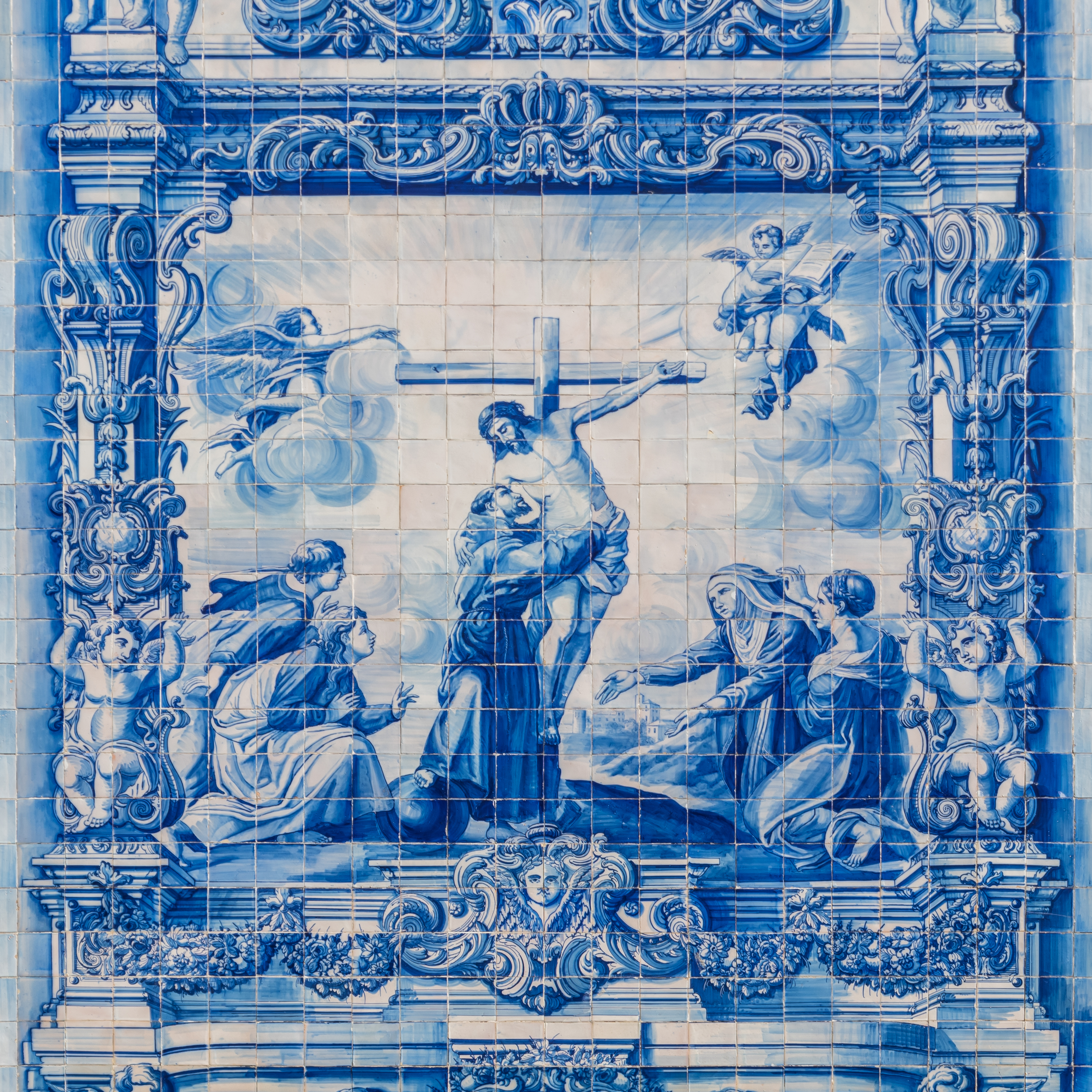
Azulejo facade of the Capela das Almas in Porto, Portugal.

Buildings coated entirely in azulejos are found in both Portugal and Brazil, and in both religious and domestic architecture. The Capela das Almas in Porto, Portugal is an early and well-preserved example of the azulejo-glazed building; similar sobrados were constructed in the Ladeira dos Aflitos, Boqueirão, and Soledade neighborhoods of Bahia. The azulejos of Sobrado Azulejado are of two general types, both white with blue design. Those around the window are in the painting in the negative technique, which originated in Belgium in the 17th century. They measure 14 square centimetres (2.2 in^{2}). Those that cover the majority of the facade are of the a renda design, a symmetrical type possibly influenced by design in Coimbra, Portugal. The "a renda" tiles measure 13 square centimetres (2.0 in^{2}).

== Protected status ==
The Sobrado Azulejado was listed as a historic structure by the National Institute of Historic and Artistic Heritage in 1969. It is listed as Processo 717-T, inscription no. 417. The directive is dated August 30, 1969.

== See also ==
- Palace of the Commercial Association of Bahia
