= Modelo Market =

Handicraft market located in Salvador, Bahia, Brazil

- Mercado Modelo
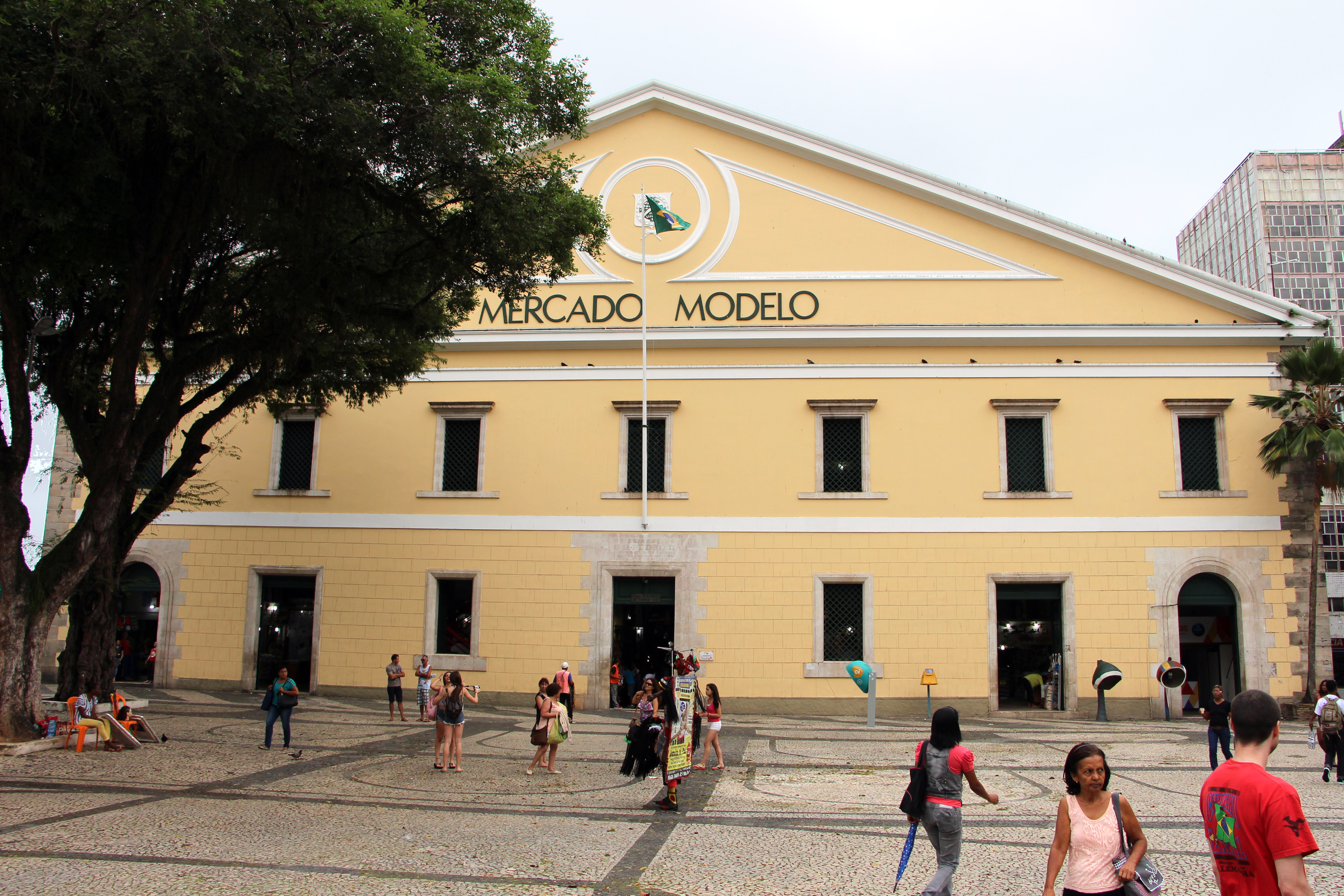
- Building facade.
- Interactive map of the Modelo Market area

General information
- Type: Market
- Architectural style: Neoclassical architecture
- Location: Salvador, Bahia, Brazil, Cairu Square, Comércio (Salvador)
- Coordinates: 12°58′21″S 38°30′49″W
- Construction started: 1860 (as Customs Office)
- Inaugurated: February 2, 1912

Technical details
- Floor count: 2
- Floor area: 8,410 m²

Other information
- Number of stores: 266

Modelo Market (Portuguese: Mercado Modelo) is a handicraft market located in the city of Salvador, Bahia state, Brazil. It was inaugurated on February 2, 1912, and has occupied, since 1971, the building of the old Salvador Customs House. It is located in the Comércio neighborhood, one of the oldest and most traditional commercial areas of Salvador, and is an important tourist attraction, visited by 80% of the city's tourists. Facing the Bay of All Saints, it is next to the Lacerda Elevator and the Historic Center (which includes Pelourinho). In neoclassical style architecture, the building is listed by the National Institute of Historic and Artistic Heritage (Instituto do Patrimônio Histórico e Artístico Nacional - IPHAN).

With 8,410 square meters and two floors, it houses 266 stores that offer the largest variety of handicrafts, gifts, and souvenirs from Bahia, and has two of the most traditional Bahian restaurants, Maria de São Pedro, with eighty years of existence, and Camafeu de Oxóssi.

The song Mercado Modelo, by Antônio Carlos, Jocafi and Ildázio Tavares, laments in its lyrics the 1969 fire that destroyed the original building. The song was recorded in 1973 by the singer Vanusa and released on her fourth album.

== History ==
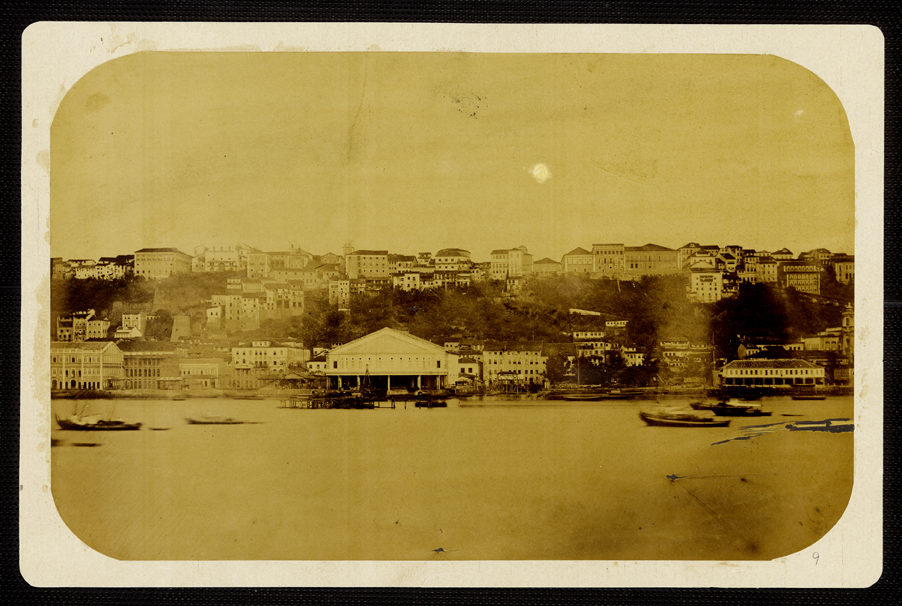
Comércio neighborhood in the XIX century. In the center, the building, when it functioned as a customs house.

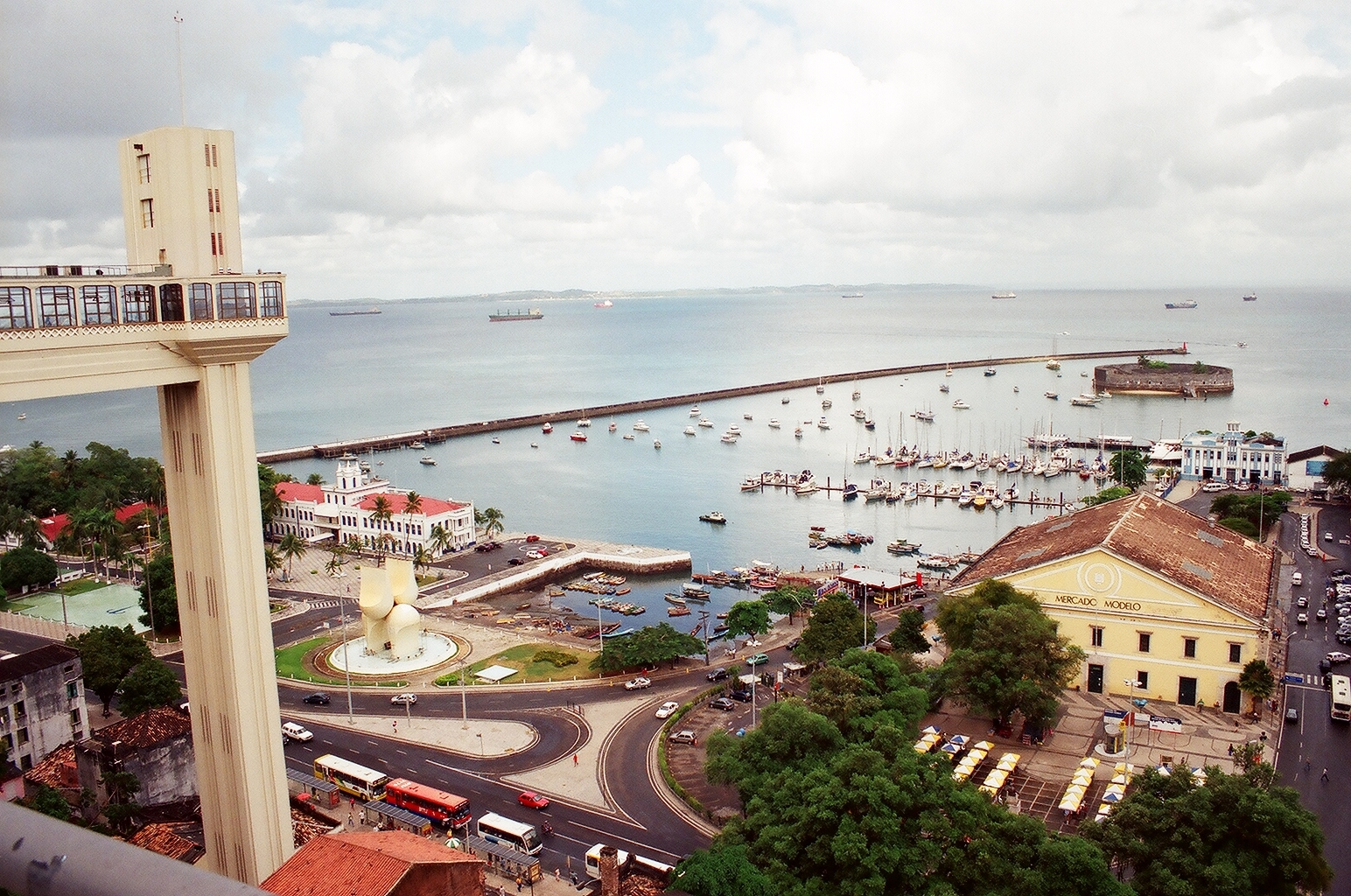
In Visconde de Cairu Square, on the left is the Monument to the City of Salvador, a fountain that marks the former site of the market building.

The Mercado Modelo arose out of the need for a supply center in the Lower City of Salvador. Between the old Customs House building and Largo da Conceição, it was a commercial center where it was possible to acquire items as varied as fruit and vegetables, cereals, animals, cigars, cachaças, and Candomblé articles. Thus, the market was inaugurated on February 2, 1912 in a building next to the old Customs House building, which had been built in 1860 and inaugurated in 1861. The market's supply was served by the ramp that bears its name, former port of the schooners that crossed the Bay of All Saints.

There is little information about an early 1917 first fire in the original market building, but it is not believed to have been of catastrophic proportions. In 1922, a fire broke out in the early hours of January 7, reducing the Market to caves (underground areas), causing more than one thousand contos de réis in damages. When it was rebuilt and its original yellow and red paintwork was replaced by green, it was nicknamed the Tartaruga Verde (Green Turtle). And in 1943, a third fire was registered on February 28 (a Sunday), with the partial destruction of its facilities. The causes of the fire were not identified, and the building was recovered.

On August 1, 1969, the market was the victim of the most violent fire in its history, to the point of making the reconstruction of the original building unfeasible, whose debris had to be demolished for public safety reasons. As of February 2, 1971, it was moved to the 3rd Customs House in Salvador, a 19th-century neoclassical style building, protected by IPHAN. On the site, where the primitive market used to be, a sculpture by Mário Cravo Júnior, the Monument to the City of Salvador, was erected.

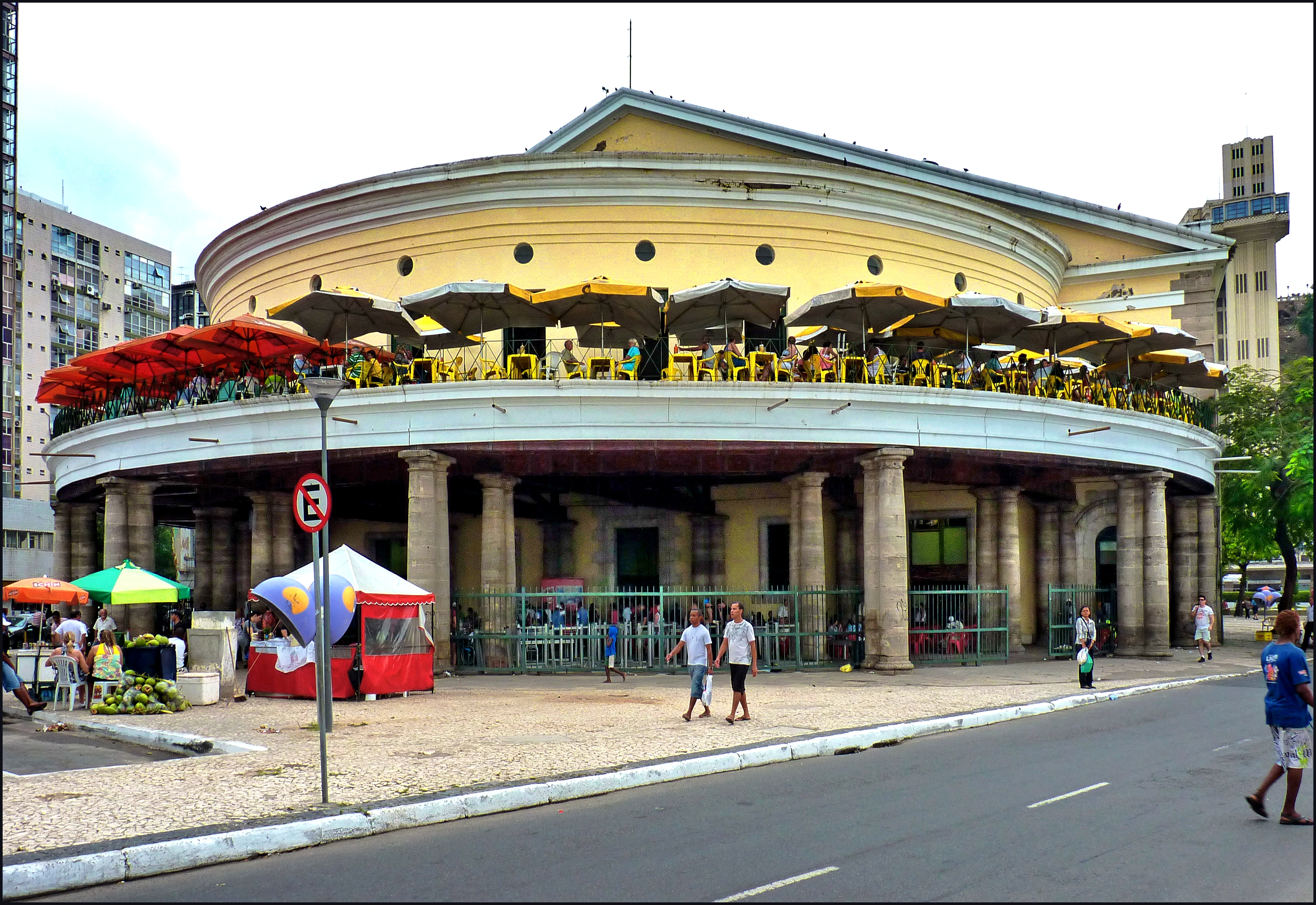
Lower level of the Modelo Market, where the restaurants are located.

A new fire in 1984, already in the current building, destroyed facilities and led it to an extensive renovation, allowing its reinauguration on January 10 of that same year.

In 2016, it was reported that the market was undergoing financial difficulty. Administered by the permission holders' association, which had no way to exercise the power of administrative police to combat defaults. Therefore, it would be administered by the City Hall of Salvador, through the Secretariat of Public Order (Secretaria de Ordem Pública - Semop), whose transitional process was being mediated by the Public Ministry. In 2018 it was listed by Mega Curioso in "20 of the most haunted places in Brazil".

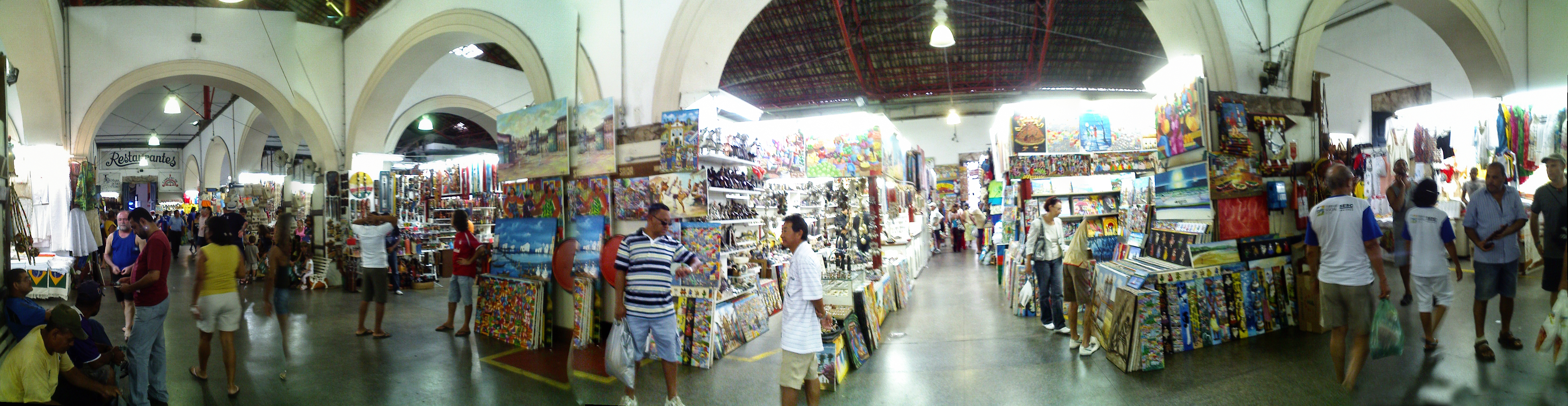
Inside view of the Modelo Market.

== See also ==
- Historic Center of Salvador
- Elevador Lacerda

== Bibliography ==
- Azevedo, Paulo Ormindo de (1985). Alfândega e o Mercado: Memória e Restauração. Salvador: Secretaria de Planejamento, Ciência e Tecnologia do Estado da Bahia.
