= Caramuru Building =

- Edifício Caramuru
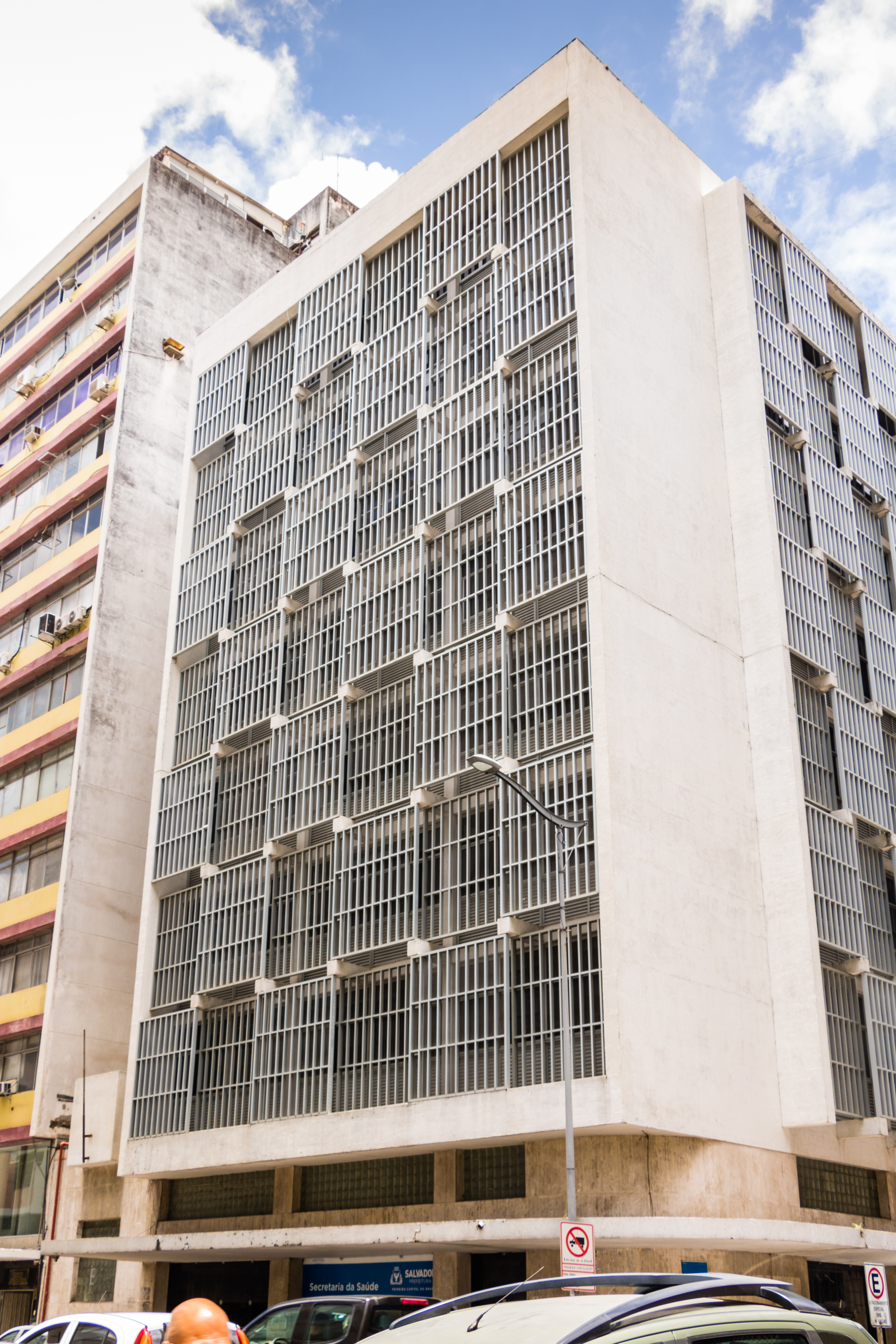
- Caramuru Building (Edifício Caramuru), Salvador, Bahia

- Location within Brazil

General information
- Architectural style: Modernist
- Location: Avenida Ipiranga, 1284, Centro, Bahia, Brazil
- Coordinates: 12.971351°S 38.513946°W
- Groundbreaking: 1946

Height
- Architectural: Modern

Technical details
- Floor count: 8
- Lifts/elevators: 2

Design and construction
- Architect: Paulo Antunes Ribeiro

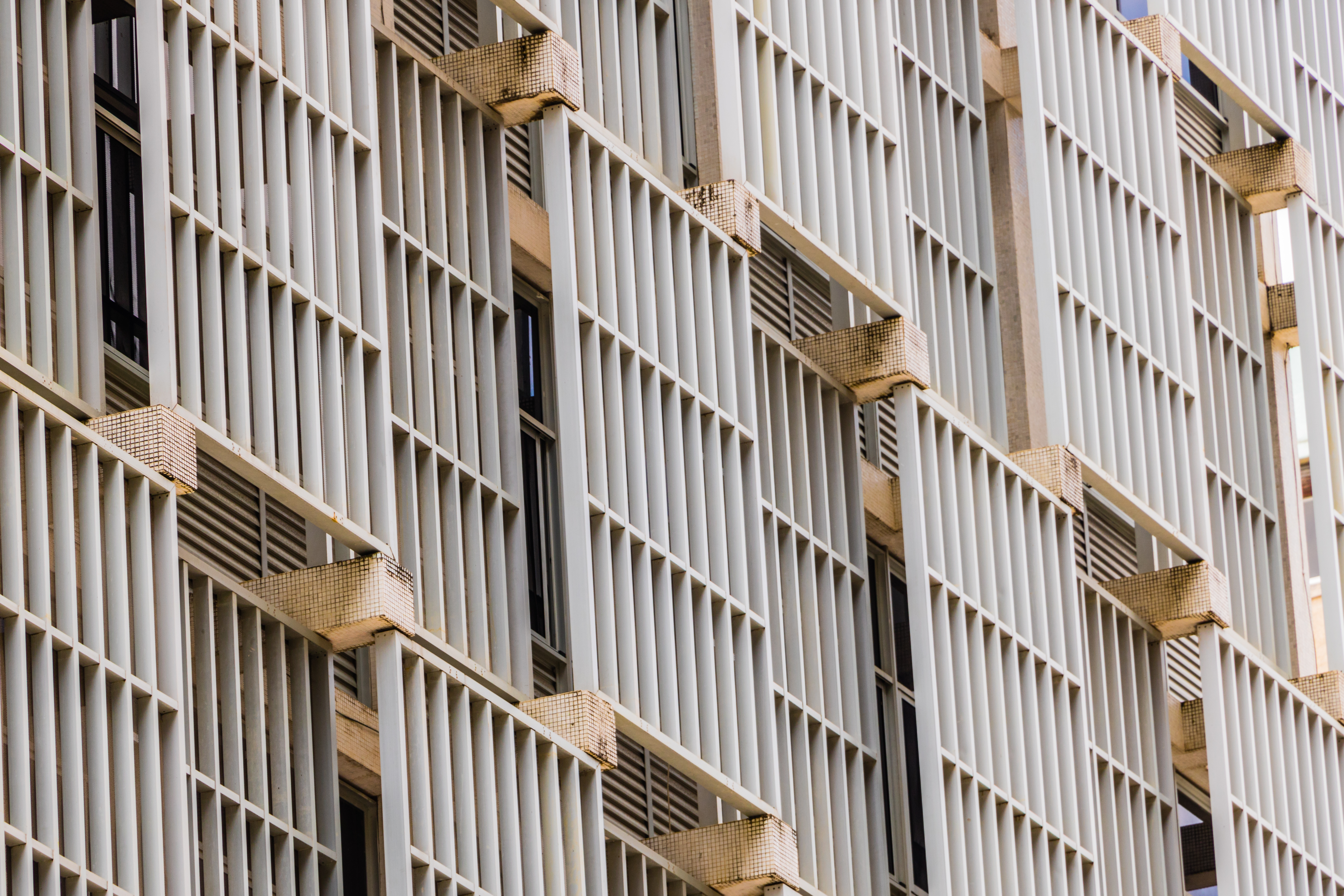
Exterior panels of the Caramuru Building

The Caramuru Building (Portuguese: Edifício Caramuru) is an office building in Salvador, Bahia, Brazil. It was designed by the architect Paulo Antunes Ribeiro (1905–1973) for Prudência Capitalização, an insurance company. Construction began on the structure in 1946 and it opened in 1951. The Caramuru Building was one of the first Modernist buildings constructed in the Northeast Region of Brazil, closely following the construction of Hotel de Bahia. It was widely recognized by the domestic and international architectural press; it was described as having a "graceful, almost abstract elegance [...] contrasted with the robust architecture of Bahia." The structure fell into disrepair but remains in the Comércio district. It is a protected structure by the state of Bahia and has provisional protected status by the by National Institute of Historic and Artistic Heritage (IPHAN).

== Etymology ==
Caramuru is a reference to Diogo Álvares Correia (c. 1475-1557), a Portuguese colonist who first lived with the Tupinambá people of Bahia. He later assisted Francisco Pereira Coutinho in founding Salvador da Bahia and in creating the first Portuguese colonial government in Brazil.

== History ==
The Caramuru Building was first vertical office building constructed in the Comércio district. The district, which consists of the old cidade baixa of Salvador and landfill It was funded and initially used as the headquarters of Prudência Capitalização, an insurance company. Construction of the building lasted ten years.

Paulo Antunes Ribeiro was among the first generation of modern Brazilian architects and his works, unusually, appeared outside the sphere of Rio de Janeiro-São Paulo modernist construction. Ribeiro's design demonstrates Le Corbusier's influence in Brazil, beginning in the mid-1930s; it includes the use of pilotis, an open floor plan, a flat facade, running windows, and a garden terrace. Ribeiro's success with the Caramuru Building continued with the Hotel da Bahia (1947/1951), also in Salvador; and Hotel Amazonas in Manaus. Following the Biennial prize for the Caramuru Building and subsequent note in the architectural press, Ribeiro became president of the Institute of Brazilian Architects, serving from 1953 to 1956.

== Location ==
The Caramuru Building overlooks Bahia de Todos os Santos on the corner of Rua da Grécia and Avenida Estados Unidos, an avenue which runs across the coastline of the bay. The building is located in the Comércio district of the lower city (cidade baixa) below the Historic Center of Salvador to the north west of the Mercado Model and the Lacerdo Elevator, both prominent historical landmarks in the lower city.

== Structure ==
Caramuru Building was constructed using reinforced concrete with wood panels on the interior. It has seven stories and a penthouse apartment. The garden terrace is protected from excessive wind by curved walls of cement blocks. The building is built on the Franki piling system; the average depth of the piles is 10 metres (33 ft).

In the garden terrace of Caramuru Building, an orthogonal prismatic volume houses an apartment for the directors of the company, while an attached cylindrical volume houses the engine room of the elevators.

=== Brises-soleils ===
Ribeiro's early use of brises-soleils was unique and widely noted in Brazil. He construction a system of light iron grids, 2 by 3 meters high, detached from the facades and arranged in two planes, alternating in chessboard, spaced 25 centimeters and supported on concrete consoles protruding from the floor slabs. Vertical panels measuring 6 square meters were covered by metal screens. Placed in an alternative design on two sides of the building to provided solar protection to the interior. Additionally, they provided an open view of the Bay of All Saints, now obstructed.

=== Terrace garden and Orfeu Sculpture ===
The Caramuru Building demonstrates the integration between art and architecture characteristic of period in its use of a wire sculpture by Mário Cravo Júnior. Cravo Júnior's work was placed on the curved façade of the penthouse apartment and faced the rooftop garden. The sculpture, called Orfeu (Orpheus), and made of delicate copper wire. It was lost or destroyed some time in the early 21st century.

=== Interior design ===
Internal partitions on the office floors were made of wood and removed as needed.

== Reception and honors ==
The Caramuru Building received significant notice after its construction, both within Brazil and by architectural publications overseas. It was featured in L'Architecture d'Aujourd'hui (1952), Domus (1954) and Architectural Review (1954).

The Carumaru Building received honorable mention at the 1st International Architecture Biennial of São Paulo in 1951. The architectural historical José Eduardo Lefèvre calls the building an "icon of modernist architecture in Brazil and a point of international reference in our country."

== Protected status ==
The Caramuru Building is a protected structure by the state-level Instituto do Patrimônio Artístico e Cultural da Bahia (IPAC). It attained provisional protected status by the by National Institute of Historic and Artistic Heritage (IPHAN) in 2008.

== Condition ==
IPAC and other government bodies attempted to renovate and restore the Caramuru Building after it received landmark status in 2007. IPAC negotiated an agreement between the owners of the Caramuru Building and Mário Cravo Júnior to produce a new version of Orfeu sculpture; its attempts were unsuccessful. Reconstruction of the garden terrace was planned and partially executed.

== Access ==
The Caramuru Building functions as a government office and may not be visited.
