= Mário Cravo Júnior =

- Born: 13 April 1923; Salvador, Bahia, Brazil
- Died: 1 August 2018 (aged 95); Salvador, Bahia, Brazil
- Occupations: Sculptor, designer, painter
- Relatives: Mário Cravo Neto (son); Christian Cravo (grandson); Castro Alves (his mother's cousin)

Mário Cravo Júnior (13 April 1923 – 1 August 2018) was a Brazilian sculptor, designer, and painter. He was part of the first generation of plastic artists in the city of Salvador, along with artists such as Carybé and Genaro de Carvalho. He worked as a plastic artist in the 1970s, he created numerous individual and collective expositions, awards, and sculptures in open spaces throughout Brazil, mainly in Salvador, along with having his works in museums worldwide. His works drew from various materials and inspirations, including the Afro-Brazilian influences of his native Bahia. His most well known work is the "Fonte da Rampa do Mercado" in the Comércio neighborhood of Salvador. His son, Mário Cravo Neto, and grandson, Christian Cravo, are both renowned photographers.

== Biography ==
Cravo's parents were Mario da Silva Cravo, a prosperous farm owner and merchant, and Marina Jorge Cravo, a cousin of poet Castro Alves. They lived in Salvador when Mário, the first of four children, was born. The family came from Alagoinhas in an attempt to establish themselves in Salvador, but a little while after moved back to Alagoinhas due to Cravo's father being elected mayor of the city. He was active in politics despite also being mainly in agriculture and commerce, a tradition within the family. He also wrote the book "Memórias de um homem de boa fé" (1975). Due to Cravo Júnior's mother liking literature and poetry, she was responsible for his first contact with books.

During his time in school he returned to Salvador to study, attending Colégio Antônio Vieira. It was during this period that he built up his talent for design and his interest in astronomy. In his teenage years, he began forming clay formations with the clay found on the banks of the Itapicuru River. During the same time period, despite having built an observatory on a farm his father bought in a rural part of Bahia state, he lost his passion for astronomy when he went to college to study engineering. He would later graduate from the Federal University of Bahia with both a Masters' and a Doctorate in Fine Arts. After a turbulent period between professions, Mário began to set out and start his artistic career. During his time in rural Bahia, he also became interested in sculpting. He later studied with Ivan Meštrović in sculpting at the College of Fine Arts at Syracuse University, later completing works in the Manhattan neighborhood of Greenwich Village with Jacques Lipchitz. In 1945, he married Lúcia and had 4 children together. He has also trained artists such as Agnaldo Dos Santos, a renowned Black Brazilian sculptor in Salvador who won several prizes in his lifetime. In 1960, his name was etched into the Brazilian pavilion at the Venice Biennale.

One of the defining characteristics of his work is monumentalism, which is present in "Fonte da Rampa do Mercado". This work was ordered by then-mayor Antônio Carlos Magalhães, and was constructed out of fiberglass in a metal cast. It is 22 meters in height. The work had been damaged in 2019 due to a fire, but was renovated. His works, along with the works of other famous people from Bahia, inspired Salvador-based rapper Baco Exu do Blues in his 2018 album Esú. He also constructed the Orfeu statue in front of the Caramuru Building, as well as Cruz Caída, which memorializes the Old Cathedral of Salvador, which was demolished in the 1930s.

On 1 August 2018, Cravo died in Salvador at 95 years old.

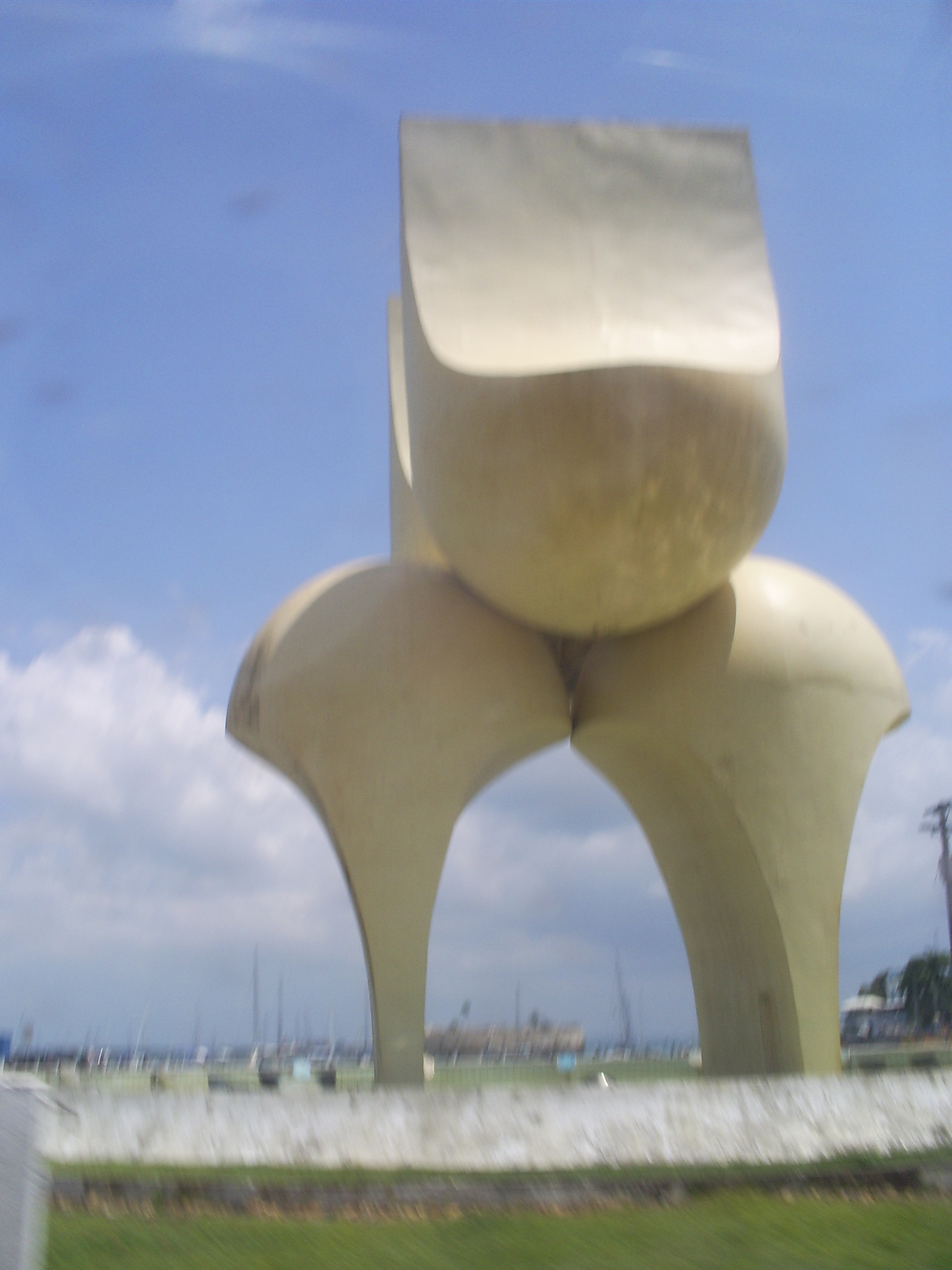
Fonte da Rampa do Mercado in the Comércio neighborhood of Salvador.
