= Mário Cravo Neto =

Brazilian photographer (1947–2009)

Mário Cravo
- Born: 20 April 1947; Salvador, Bahia, Brazil
- Died: 9 August 2009 (aged 62); Salvador, Bahia, Brazil
- Occupation(s): Photographer, Sculptor, Draughtsman
- Relatives: Otávio Cravo (Brother)

Mário Cravo Neto (Salvador, April 20, 1947 – Salvador, August 9, 2009) was a Brazilian photographer, sculptor and draughtsman. Mário Cravo, son of the sculptor Mário Cravo Júnior, was one of the first contemporary photographers of Brazil. Since his early life, he was in contact with circle of artists and, when an adolescent, he met Pierre Verger, friend of his father. In 1968, he studied for two years at the Art Students League of New York. After that, he returned to Brazil and first exhibited the sculptures created in New York at the 12th São Paulo Art Biennial. He worked mainly with black-and-white photography, and representing the religion of Candomble. In 2005, he exhibited at Rencontres d'Arles festival.

He died in 2009 in Salvador due to skin cancer. Cravo is the father of Brazilian photographer Christian Cravo.
