= Elevador Lacerda =

Lacerda Elevator
- Elevador Lacerda
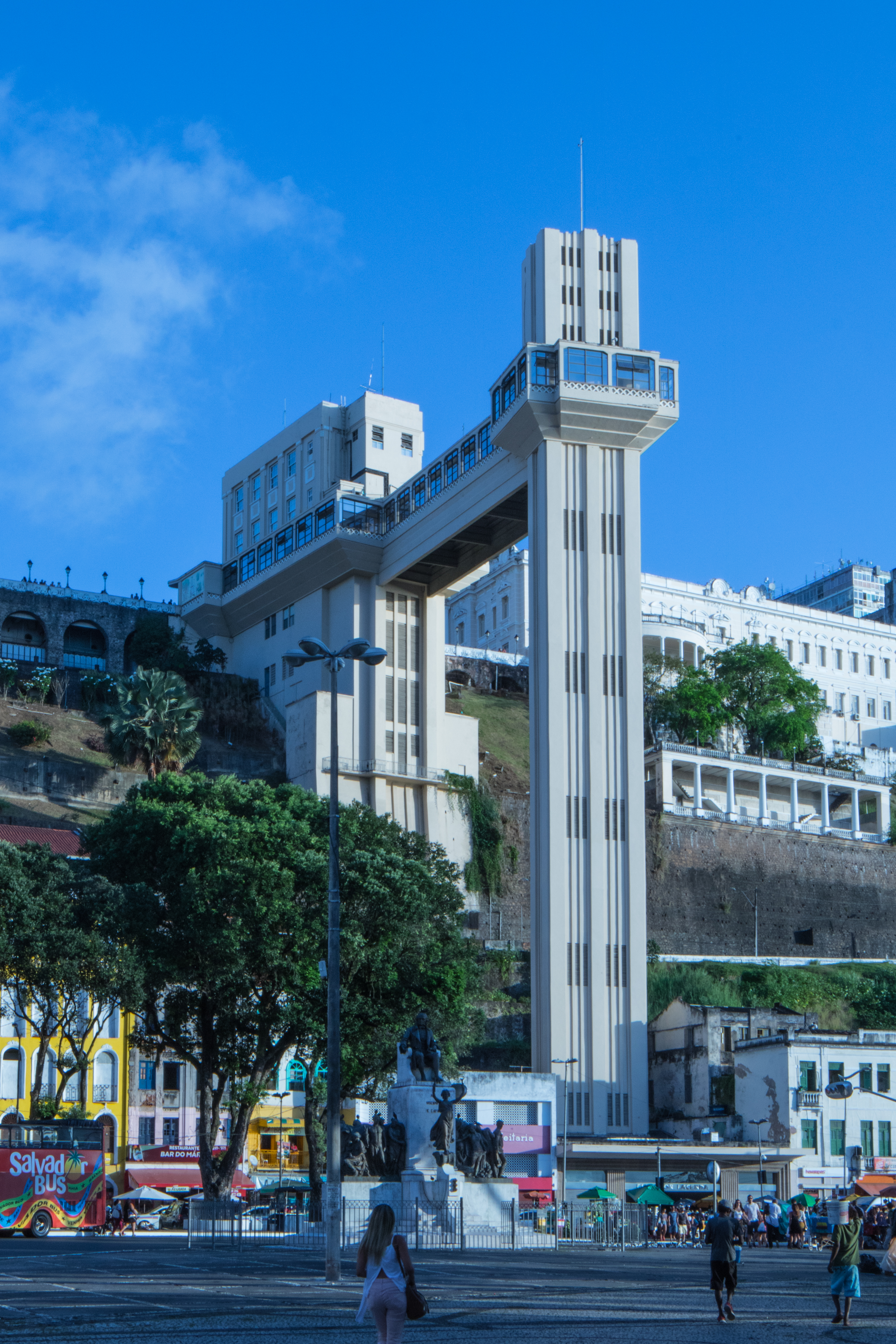
- Interactive map of the Lacerda Elevator area

General information
- Location: Salvador, Bahia, Brazil
- Coordinates: 12°58′27″S 38°30′48″W
- Completed: 1869

Height
- Height: 72 meters

National Historic Heritage of Brazil
- Designated: 2002
- Reference no.: 1497

The Lacerda Elevator (Elevador Lacerda) is a public urban elevator located in Salvador, Brazil, connecting the lower city (Cidade Baixa) to the upper city (Cidade Alta). The 72 metres (236 ft) elevator was built between 1869 and 1873; it was named after Antônio de Lacerda, director of the Commercial Association of Bahia. It was a hydraulic elevator at first; later operating by electricity since 1906. The elevator towers were renovated in 1930, in an Art Deco styling. The Lacerda Elevator has two towers, one that pierces the stone slope of the Ladeira da Montanha, and the other, more visible, goes to the Cidade Baixa level. The elevator has four lifts, carrying 27 passengers each on a 30-second ride costing 0.15 reais. In 2019 it transported more than 33,000 passengers per day.

The elevator was listed as a historical heritage of Brazil by IPHAN, on 7 December 2006.

== See also ==
- Modelo Market
