= Christian Cravo =

Brazilian photographer

- Born: 1974
- Occupation: Photographer
- Website: www.christiancravo.com

Christian Cravo (born 1974) is a Brazilian photographer. Cravo was the recipient of a 2001 recipient of a Guggenheim Fellowship. His work has been featured in solo and group exhibitions internationally.

== Early life ==
Cravo was born in 1974 to a Danish mother and Brazilian father and grew up in Salvador de Bahia. His father, Mário Cravo Neto, was also a photographer and his grandfather, Mário Cravo Júnior, was a renowned sculptor. He traveled to Denmark where he was raised until he returned to Brazil at the age of 17. At the age of 12, he began to experiment with photography and built a darkroom in his home.

== Career ==
Cravo's work has been featured internationally in both solo and group exhibitions.

Cravo presented "In Jardins do Éden" in 2017. The exhibition featured 49 black and white photographs from more than 20 trips he took to Haiti since 2011. The photos highlighted the destruction of Haiti after the 2010 earthquake as well as the Voodoo religion followed by some Haitian people.

Late in 2017, he opened "Luz e Sombra," an exhibition inspired by the death of his father to skin cancer and two of his friends who died in the 2010 Haiti earthquake. It was after these deaths that he traveled to Africa where he sought a change in his work. The exhibition featured photographs of African landscape and wildlife from various countries on the continent.

== Published works ==
- Luz e Sombra - 2017
- Twenty Five Years - 2016
- Salvador de Bahia : Rome noire, ville métisse (French) Paperback – 2005

== Biography ==
- Christian Cravo - 2014 (Ana Carolina Ramos, Charles Cosac) ISBN 9788540507302
