= Palace of the Commercial Association of Bahia =

Historical building in Brazil

- Palácio da Associação Comercial da Bahia
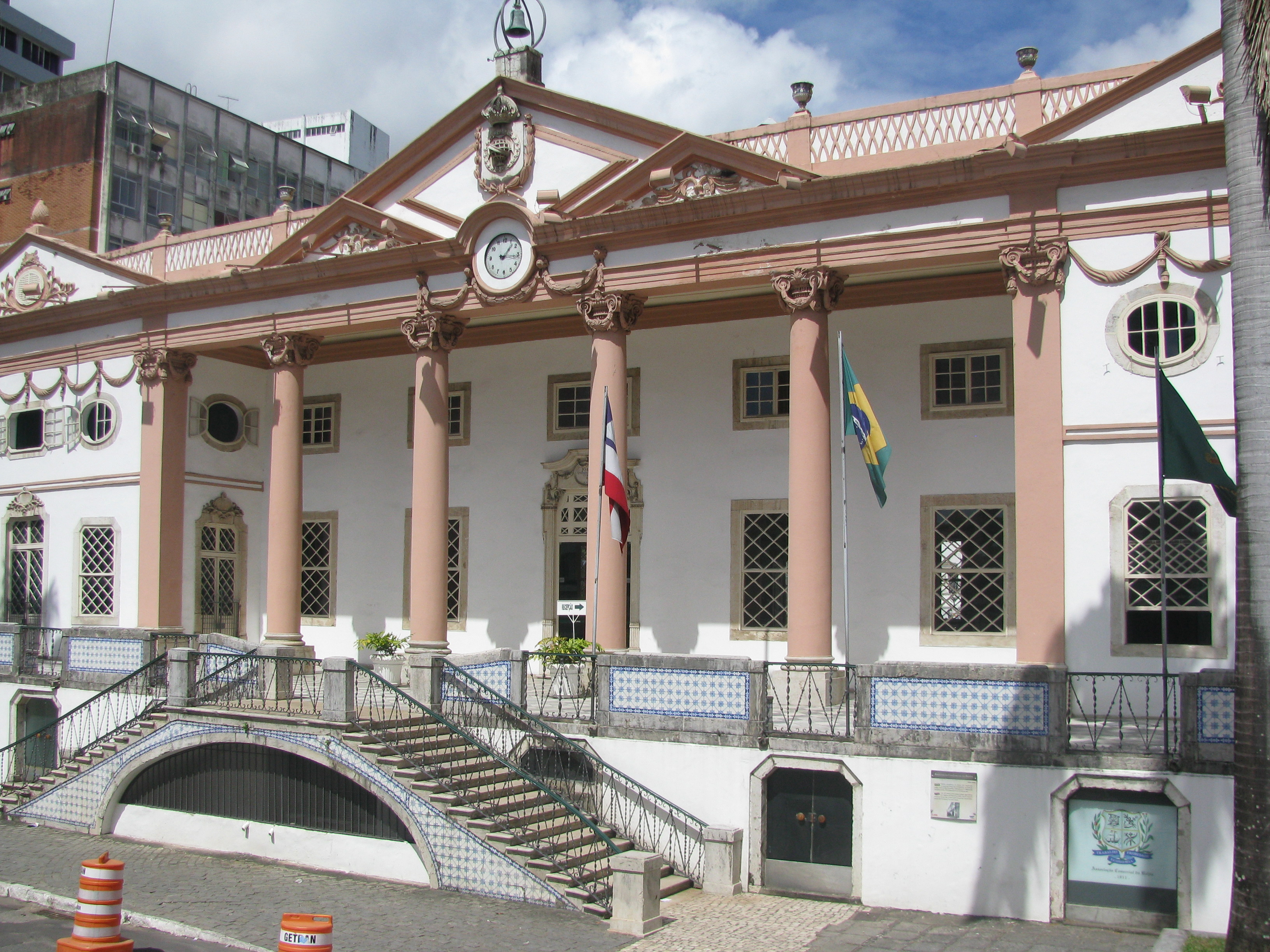
- The facade of the palace that faces Riachuelo Square.
- Interactive map of the Palace of the Commercial Association of Bahia area

General information
- Architectural style: Neoclassical
- Coordinates: 12°58′13″S 38°30′39″W
- Inaugurated: January 28, 1817
- Owner: Commercial Association of Bahia

Design and construction
- Architect: Cosme Damião da Cunha Fidié

The Palace of the Commercial Association of Bahia (Portuguese: Palácio da Associação Comercial da Bahia) is a building that houses the headquarters of the Commercial Association of Bahia (ACB), which had its inauguration on January 28, 1817. It is located in the Comércio neighborhood in the municipality of Salvador, capital of the state of Bahia in Brazil.

Currently, the palace, which used to house public and private activities, does not provide any services other than those of the ACB itself. It houses a library, a pinacotheca, 19th century furniture, and other pieces that represent an invaluable historical and artistic collection.

== History ==
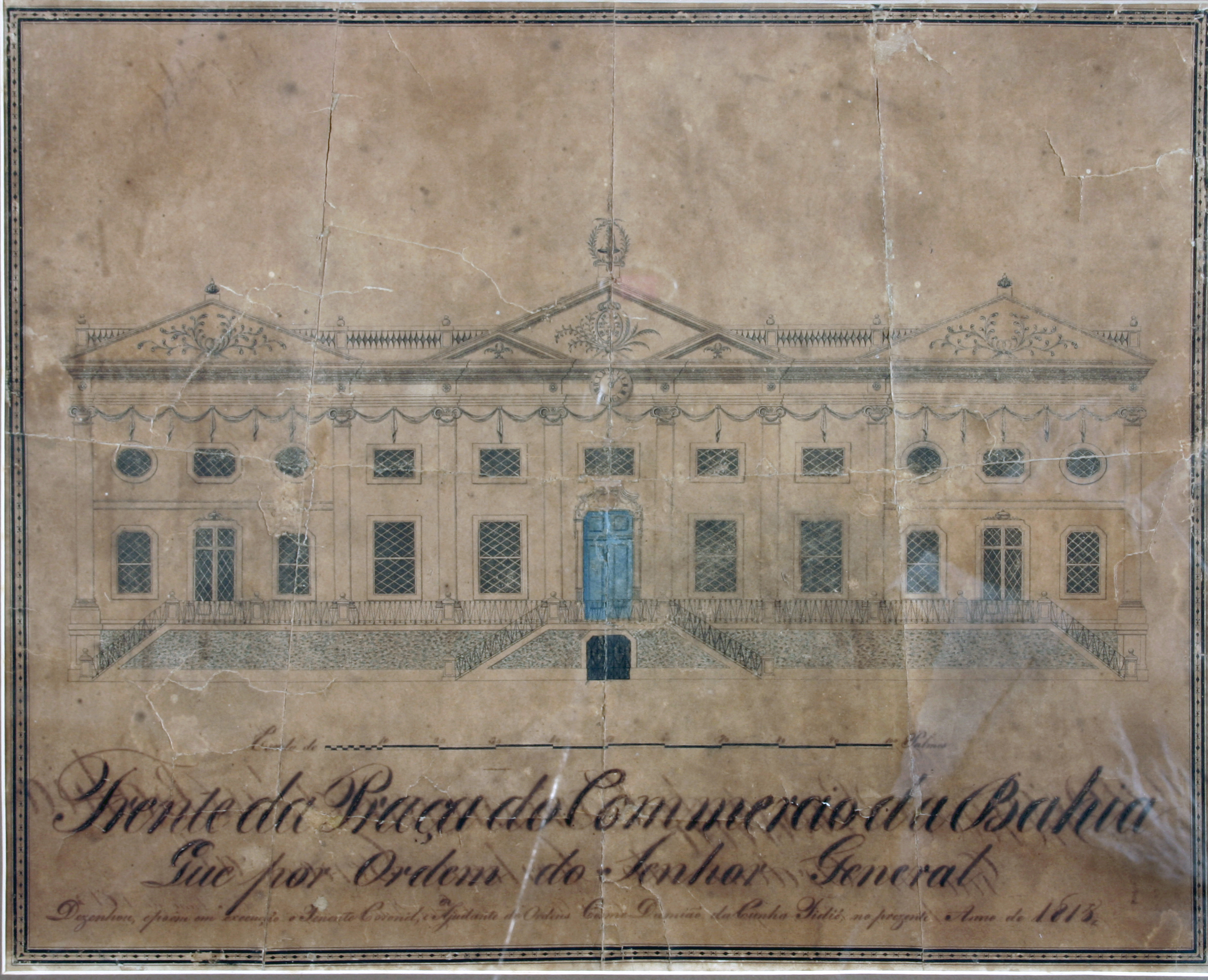
Project for the facade of the building by Cosme Damião da Cunha Fidié, 1815.

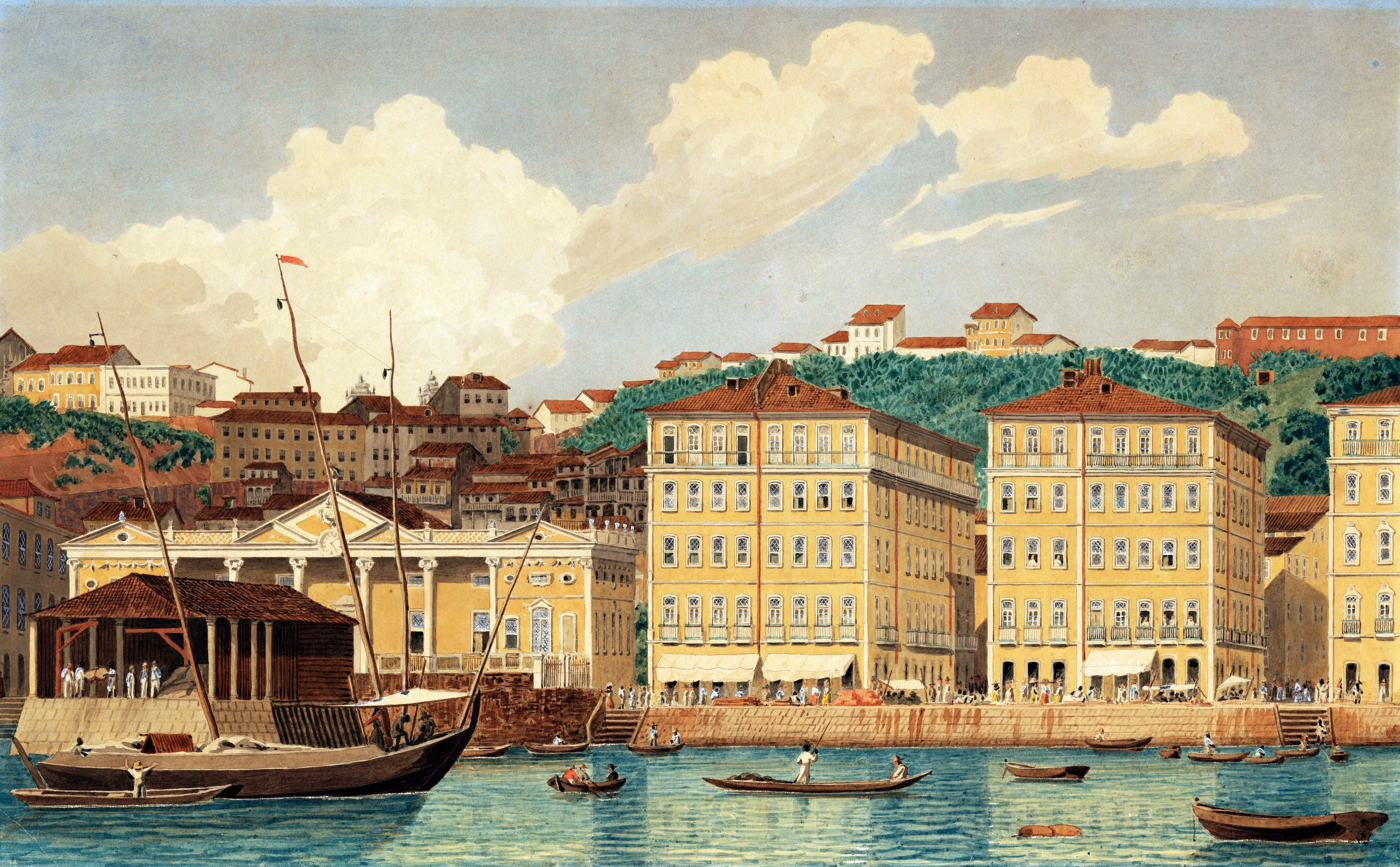
View of Salvador, painting from around 1860. The palace is on the left, on the shore of Todos os Santos Bay.

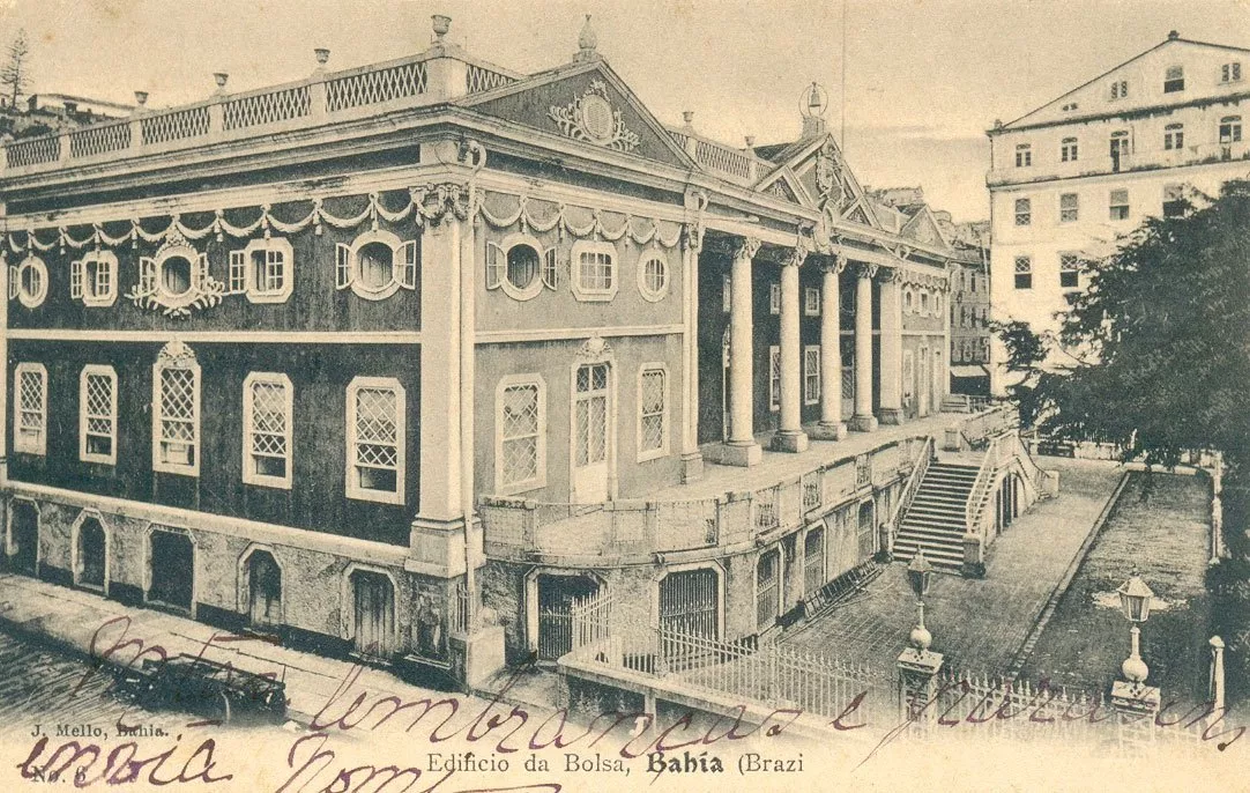
Postcard of Salvador, by J. Mello, from 1912, showing the building.

The structure of the Palace of the Commercial Association of Bahia was built on the ruins of the São Fernando Fort, which was demolished between 1814 and 1816. The construction was financed by the former governor of Bahia, Dom Marcos de Noronha e Brito, VIII Count of Arcos, and architecturally designed by Portuguese architect Cosme Damião da Cunha Fidié. It was planned by the Commercial Association of Bahia (ACB) to serve as a headquarters for events, dinners, and meetings among the merchants and inaugurated on January 28, 1817, in a solemn act. Its location was also determined by the governor. In the current building, part of the structure of the old fortress can still be found.

In 1938, the palace went through the historic registration process with the Institute of the Artistic and Cultural Heritage of Bahia (IPAC), a state agency that aims to preserve Bahia's memorials.

== Architecture ==
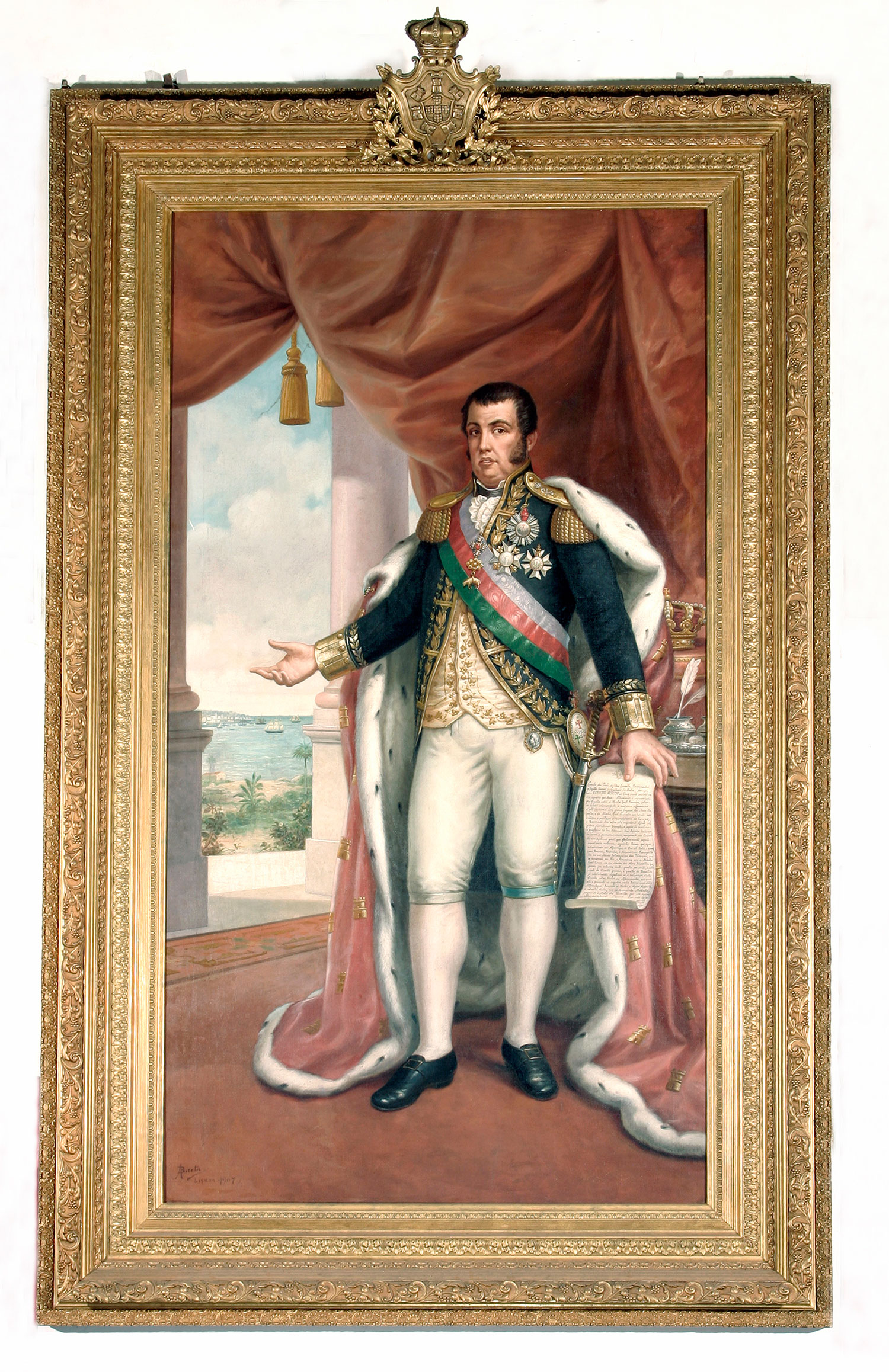
Painting by A. baeta at the Commercial Association of Bahia, portraying John VI with the Decree of the Opening of the Ports to Friendly Nations.

The building has elements of neoclassical architecture, being one of the main representatives of the style in Salvador. The main facade of the palace faces the Riachuelo Square, also built by the Association in 1866, while the back facade faces the Comércio Square. Both display the coat of arms with the weapons of the Empire of Brazil, which replaced the weapons of the United Kingdom of Portugal, Brazil and the Algarve, after the process of Brazil's Independence. It also has two marble doors with inscriptions in memory of John VI. The hall has parquet floors and crystal chandeliers.

The architect and sergeant major responsible for the project was the Portuguese Cosme Damião da Cunha Fidié. Although the facadaes are symmetrical, there are elements that can differentiate them. The first, facing Riachuelo Square, has four marble stairs and four columns inspired by Greek monuments, and the second, facing Comércio Square, has two marble stairs and no columns.

The construction of the Riachuelo Square was done by the Association and happened by the emergence of a small embankment in a part taken by the sea. As it happened in the place of arrival of visitors, the site was valued, along with the facade facing the sea, which became the main entrance to the building in 1867.

Its floors are currently configured as follows: on the first floor are located the administrative rooms and an auditorium, as well as a type of memorial that exposes the foundations of the former fort located there and a cell that had been used as a temporary prison. The second floor has the so-called Great Hall, which divides the floor into two wings that house the reception, the Meeting Room, and the President's Room. It also includes the Library and the Conciliation, Mediation, and Arbitration Chamber. Finally, there is the attic, which used to be used as a storage room, but is undergoing a project for a destination that includes public visitation.

For the celebration of its 200th anniversary, the Association underwent a renovation and restoration. A support service for visitors was created and an interactive computer center was installed to provide access to information about its history. It also has an art collection with valuable paintings, including one by Candido Portinari, old photographs, and original furniture.

== See also ==
- Marcos de Noronha e Brito, 8th Count of Arcos
- Comércio neighborhood
