= Comércio (Salvador) =

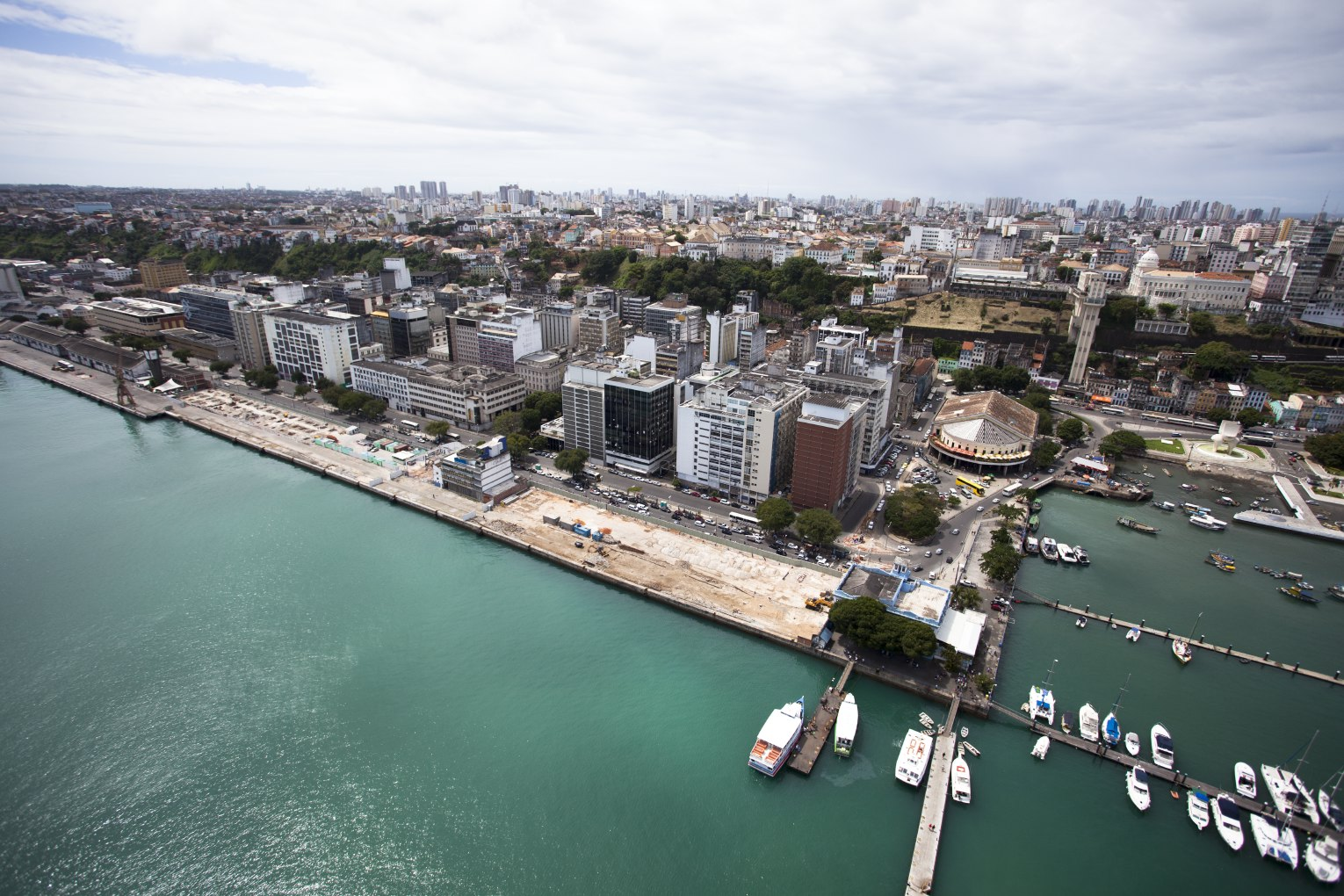
- Aerial view of Comércio

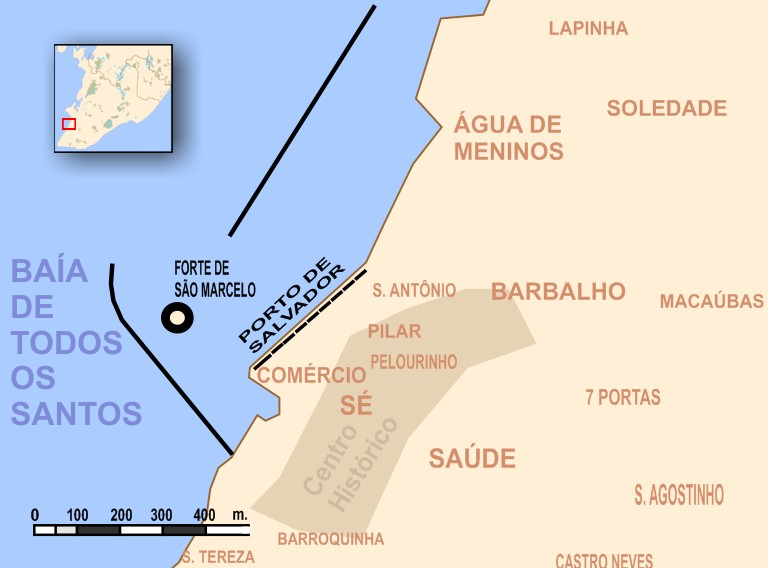

- Location of Comércio in Brazil
- Coordinates (Comércio): 12.973016°S 38.513917°W
- Country: Brazil
- City: Salvador
- Elevation: 10 m (33 ft)
- Time zone: UTC-3
- Postal codes: 40010, 40015
- Area code: +55 71

National Historic Heritage of Brazil
- Designated: 2008
- Reference no.: 1552

Comércio (Portuguese: commerce, trade) is a neighborhood of Salvador, Bahia, Brazil. The district served as the port of entry to Salvador from the beginning of the colonial period and later became home to the first planned business district in Brazil. It remains a financial center in the state of Bahia, as well as a municipal transportation hub and tourist destination. Comércio is home to numerous national heritage sites dating from the early colonial period to the 20th century. Comércio as a whole was listed as a national historic district of Brazil by the National Institute of Historic and Artistic Heritage in 2008.

== Location ==
Comércio is located in lower city (cidade baixa) below the Historic Center (cidade alta) of Salvador. It extends from the Bahia Marina at its southernmost point to the breakwaters near the Port of Salvador in the Água de Meninos district to the north. The Bay of All Saints makes up its western border and the districts of Sé, Pelourinho, and Pilar sit above it to the east. The district includes São Marcelo Fort, a 17th-century military structure on a small piece of land 300 metres (980 ft) from the coast. The upper city, or cidade alta, sits 80 metres (260 ft) above the lower city.

The largest square in the district, Visconde de Cairu Square Plaza, is located to the south adjacent to the Port. Three avenues, all parallel to the port, cross the neighborhood from north to south: Avenida da França, named for the country of France; Avenida Estados Unidos, named for the United States; and Rua Miguel Calmon, named for Miguel Calmon du Pin e Almeida, a Bahian politician and diplomat. Cross streets in the district are named for Sweden, Norway, Spain, Holland, Poland, Argentina, England, Greece, and Belgium. Avenida Lafayete Coutinho begins at the plaza and runs south along the Bay of All Saints out of the district to Praça Dois de Julho. The Ladeira da Montanha was constructed in the 19th century to connect the lower and upper city; it was also home to a red-light district.

== History ==
Comércio, in the period as the Cidade Baixa, consisted of a narrow street that ran from the port to the avenue that led to the upper city. The area was home to the warehouses of the city and was the commercial center for both colonial Portuguese and foreign merchants, notably those in the slave trade. The avenue was lined with shops selling fruits, vegetables, and meat. A single gutter in the middle of the avenue provided the only waste drainage in the district. Maria Graham, who visited in 1821, described it as "without any exception, the filthiest place I ever was in."

The Cidade Baixa served as the point of arrival for slaves in Brazil and slave markets existed on every street in the district. Graham described the slave market as "there are shops full of those poor wretches, who are exposed there stark naked and bought like cattle, over whom the buyers have the same power." Wealthy merchants and plantation owners maintained homes, churches, and civic buildings in the Cidade Alta, the upper city, far from the Cidade Baixa.

A large-scale landfill project began in Comércio in 1910 as part of the modernization of the Port of Salvador. The expansion of the area was balanced against the preservation of structures along the approximately four narrow streets of the historic Cidade Baixa. Nearly every street in the district was widened and a large strip of empty land sat between the historic district and the port.

The district subsequently became the center of business and finance in Salvador by the mid-20th century. Comércio suffered a period of stagnation in the early 1980s and companies migrated to the Iguatemi region. It remains the location of the regional headquarters of several corporations, including the Bradesco, Citibank, and the Bank of Brazil in Bahia. Public agencies headquartered in the district include the Bahia State Board of Trade (JUCEB), the Port Customs of Salvador, and the National Social Security Institute (INSS) in Bahia. Military facilities include the 2nd Naval District of the Brazilian Navy and the Naval Hospital of Salvador.

== Transportation ==
Connections between Comercio in the lower city, and the Praca da Se in the upper city date to the 19th century and are still in use. The south of Comercio is connected to the Praca da Se via the Lacerda Elevator. The north of the district is connected to via a funicular, the Plano Inclinado Gonçalves (PIG). Comércio is also an important hub of the urban bus system of Salvador. The Terminal da França, located in front of the Port, is the primary hub for bus lines.

== The Architectural, Urban and Landscape Set of the City of Salvador ==
Comércio was listed as a national historic district of Brazil by the National Institute of Historic and Artistic Heritage in 2008. It was listed under the name of the Architectural, Urban and Landscape Set of the City of Salvador (Conjunto Arquitetônico, Urbanístico e Paisagístico da Cidade Baixa de Salvador) and is included in the Book of Historical Works process no. 122-T, inscription no. 127; and the Book of Fine Arts, Inscription fls 23. Both directives are dated June 17, 1938.

== Heritage status and sites ==
In addition to the national heritage status of Comércio as a whole, the district is home to numerous national, state, and municipal heritage sites. They date from the beginning of the colonial period to the 20th century.

=== 17th century ===
- São Marcelo Fort
- Basilica of the Immaculate Conception, Salvador

=== 18th century ===
- Capela do Corpo Santo
- Port Authority (Capitania Dos Portos)
- Nautical Center of Bahia
- Gold Market

=== 19th century ===
- Sobrado Azulejado
- Palace of the Commercial Association of Bahia

=== 20th century ===
- Mercado Modelo
- Cacao Museum
- Caramuru Building
- Mural in the Argentina Building, Carlos Bastos
- Fonte da Rampa do Mercado, Mário Cravo Junio
