= Port of Salvador =

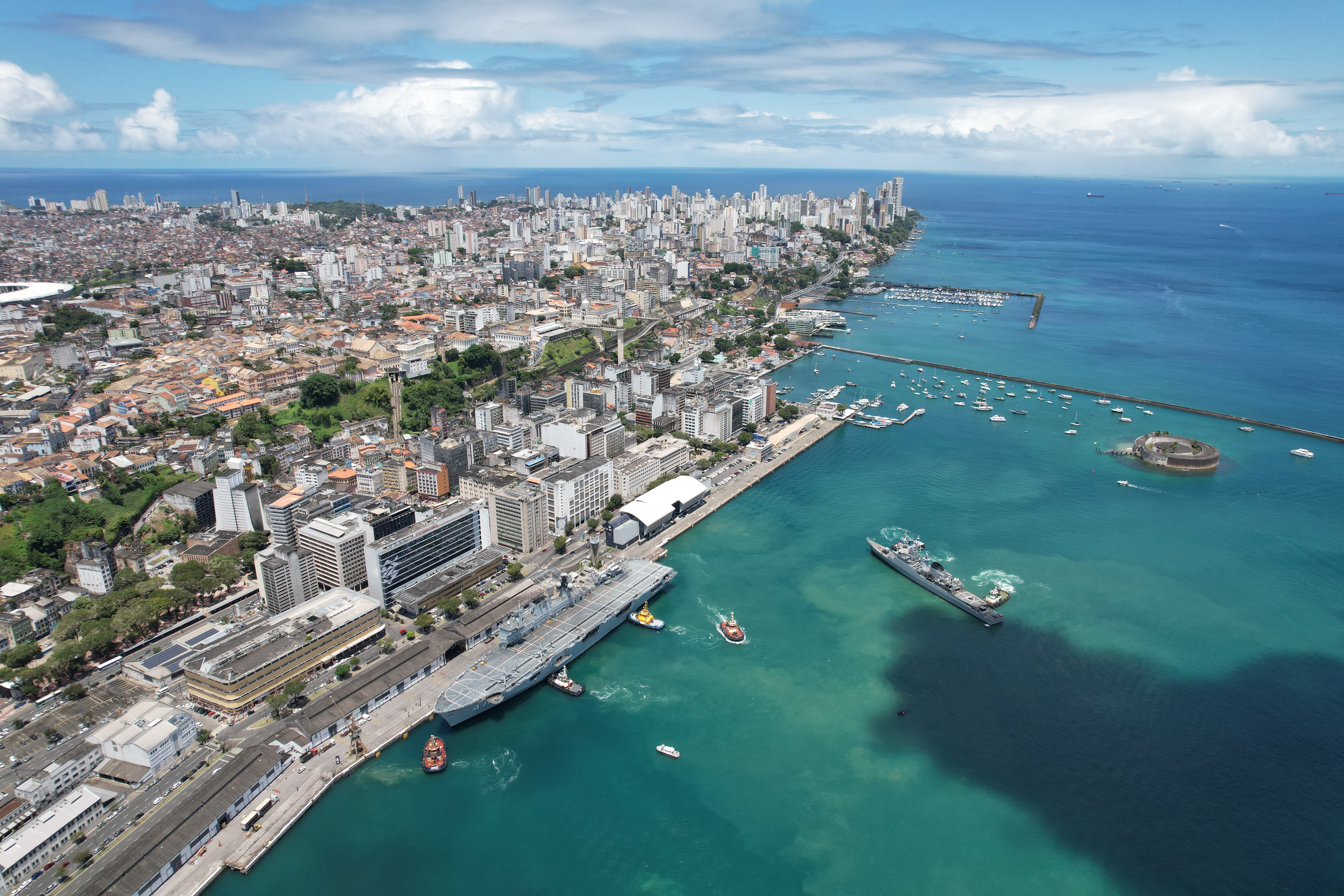
- Interactive map of Port of Salvador

Location
- Country: Brazil
- Location: Salvador, Bahia
- Coordinates: 12°57′31″S 38°30′27″W

Details
- Opened: 1502
- Operated by: Companhia das Docas do Estado da Bahia (CODEBA)
- Type of harbour: Harbor
- Size: Medium
- President: José Muniz Rebouças

Statistics
- Vessel arrivals: 1,027
- Website; The Port of Salvador

The Port of Salvador is a seaport located in All Saints Bay in Salvador, Bahia, Brazil. It is connected to Downtown Salvador by Historic Center. The port is located in Lower City region of Salvador. Lying at the tip of a peninsula separating Todos os Santos Bay from the Atlantic Ocean.

CODEBA was established to manage and distribute cargoes throughout the State of Bahia. To assure effective operations, CODEBA seeks to provide modern infrastructure and technological support to the Port of Salvador.

In 2007 over 3 million tons of cargo moved through the Port of Salvador, including 2.6 million tons of ocean-going cargo and 530 thousand tons of internal cargo. The same year, the Port of Salvador handled 1.6 tons of container exports in 73 thousand TEUs and 753 thousand tons in container imports in 71 thousand TEUs. Further, the Port of Salvador greeted 88 cruise vessels carrying 1421 passengers.

The modern Port of Salvador is connected to inland Brazil by rail, road, and air. Its sheltered harbor is protected from tidal fluctuations. Two canals bring ocean-going vessels into the port. The anchoring area is 700 meters wide with depths from 9 to 12 meters. Major imports through the Port of Salvador are wheat and grains, foods, chemical products, equipment, vehicles, and malt. Major exports include petrochemical and iron products, granite, fruits and sisal, cellulose, copper, and vehicles.

== History ==
Europeans first saw what was to become the Port of Salvador in 1502, during the 1501-1502 expedition of Amerigo Vespucci. In 1549, Portuguese settlers led by Brazil's first governor-general, Tomé de Sousa, established the new town. It became the seat of Brazil's first Catholic bishopric in 1552, and by 1583, over 1600 people lived there. At the time of the American Revolution in the late 18th century, the Port of Salvador was bigger than any American city. The busy port was a target for pirates and privateers. Dutch soldiers captured it in 1624, but the Portuguese retook the Port of Salvador the next year, holding it until Brazilian independence in 1823. In 1763, the seat of the colonial government was moved to Rio de Janeiro, and the Port of Salvador entered an era of decline that lasted until the 20th century.

The 1940s brought economic and population growth to the Port of Salvador. By 1948, almost 350 thousand people lived there. When an industrial center and petrochemical complex were built nearby in the early 1970s, the need for a modern port became clear. The first terminal at the Port of Salvador was opened in 1975. The 1990s brought city clean-up and restoration efforts to the Port of Salvador. The old downtown area, called Pelourinho, was restored to become the city's cultural center. Although the city center is now a UNESCO World Heritage Site, it remains relatively empty. Local merchants often import events and activity to animate the area.
