= Rafael Rebecchi =

Brazilian architect

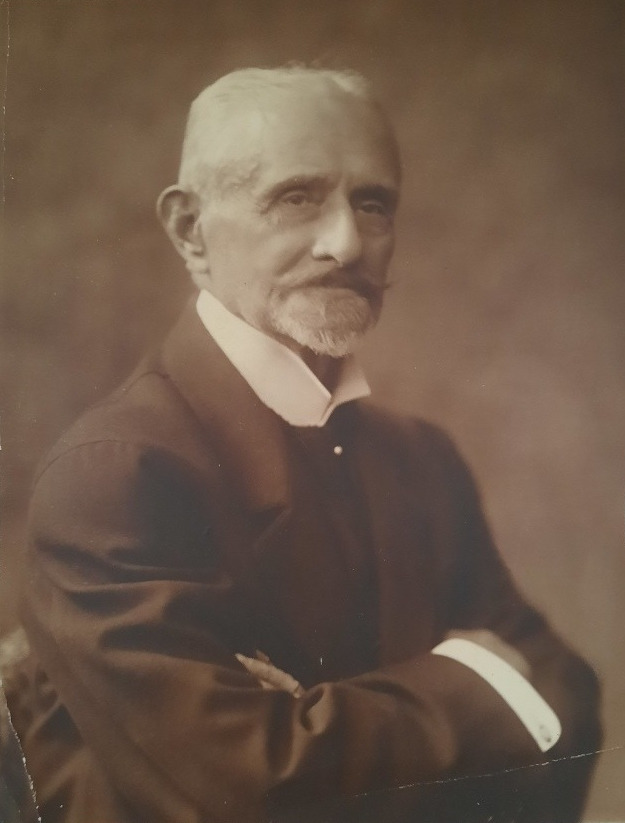
- Born: 1844; Rome, Papal States
- Died: 1922 (aged 77–78)
- Occupation: Architect

Rafael Rebecchi (1844 – 1922) was an Italian architect who established himself in Brazil in 1893. He designed several buildings for the Brazilian National Exposition of 1908 in Rio de Janeiro. He was also involved with a rebuilding project at the Old Cathedral of Rio de Janeiro. He won a facades competition for the design of 119 buildings along a street. Rebecchi was also the architect in charge of renovating the Brazilian National Archives. The renovation was completed in 1906.

== Brazilian National Exposition of 1908 ==
=== Minas Geraes state pavilion ===
The Minas Geraes building was designed Rebecchi. It had interior murals by Crispim do Amaral including a series personifying agriculture, mineralogy, manufactures and the liberal arts. Exhibits included aspects of gold and diamond mining including a small quartz crushing machine and gold-washing machinery with washers and miners demonstrating the processes involved.

=== Bahia state pavilion ===
The Bahia state pavilion occupied 54,359 square feet and was designed by Rebecchi. It displayed artwork by José Rodrigues Nunes, Bento Capinam, Macário, and Victor Meirelles, and its external sculpture was by Rodolfo Bernardelli.

== Gallery ==
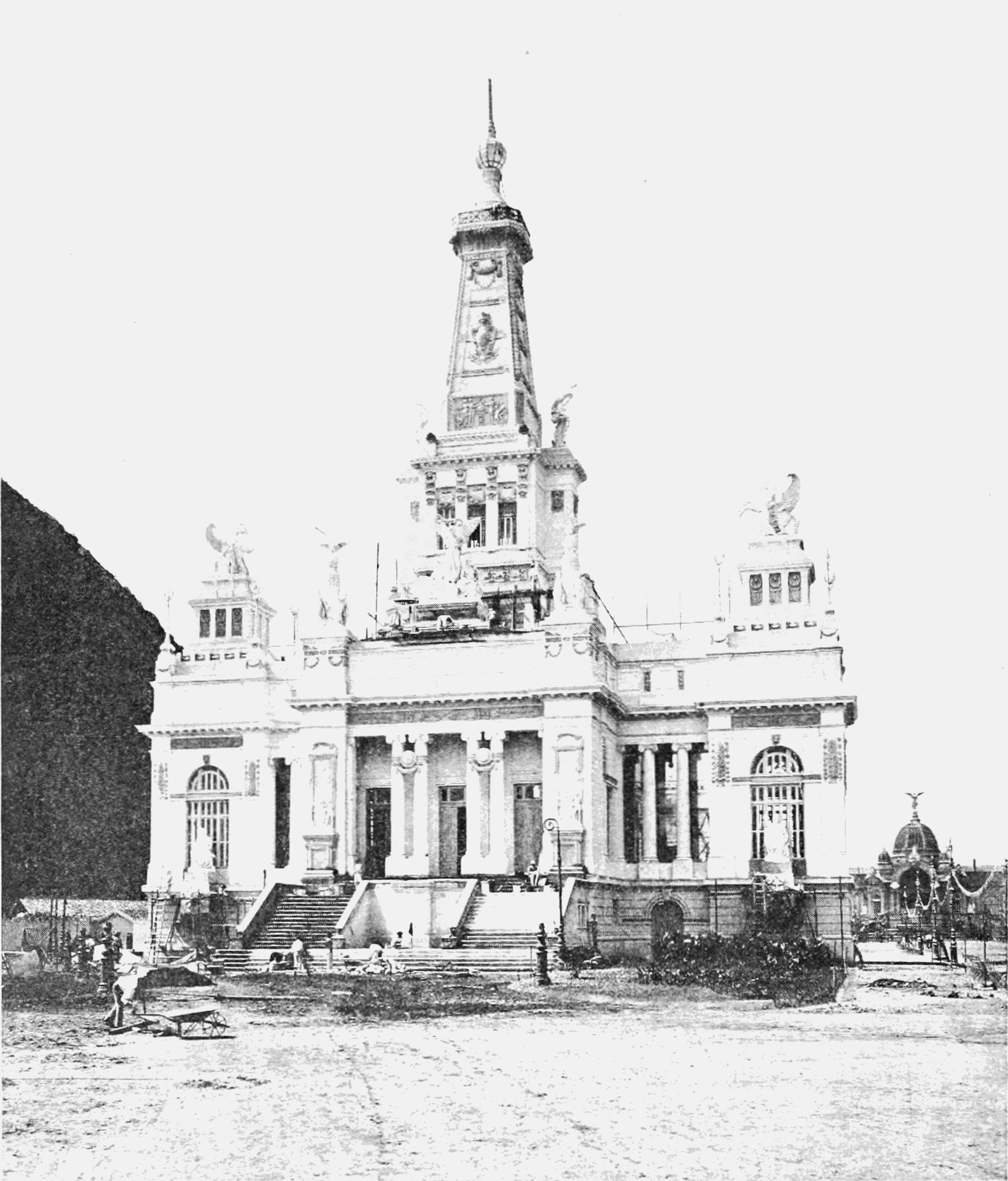
Minas Gerais state pavilion

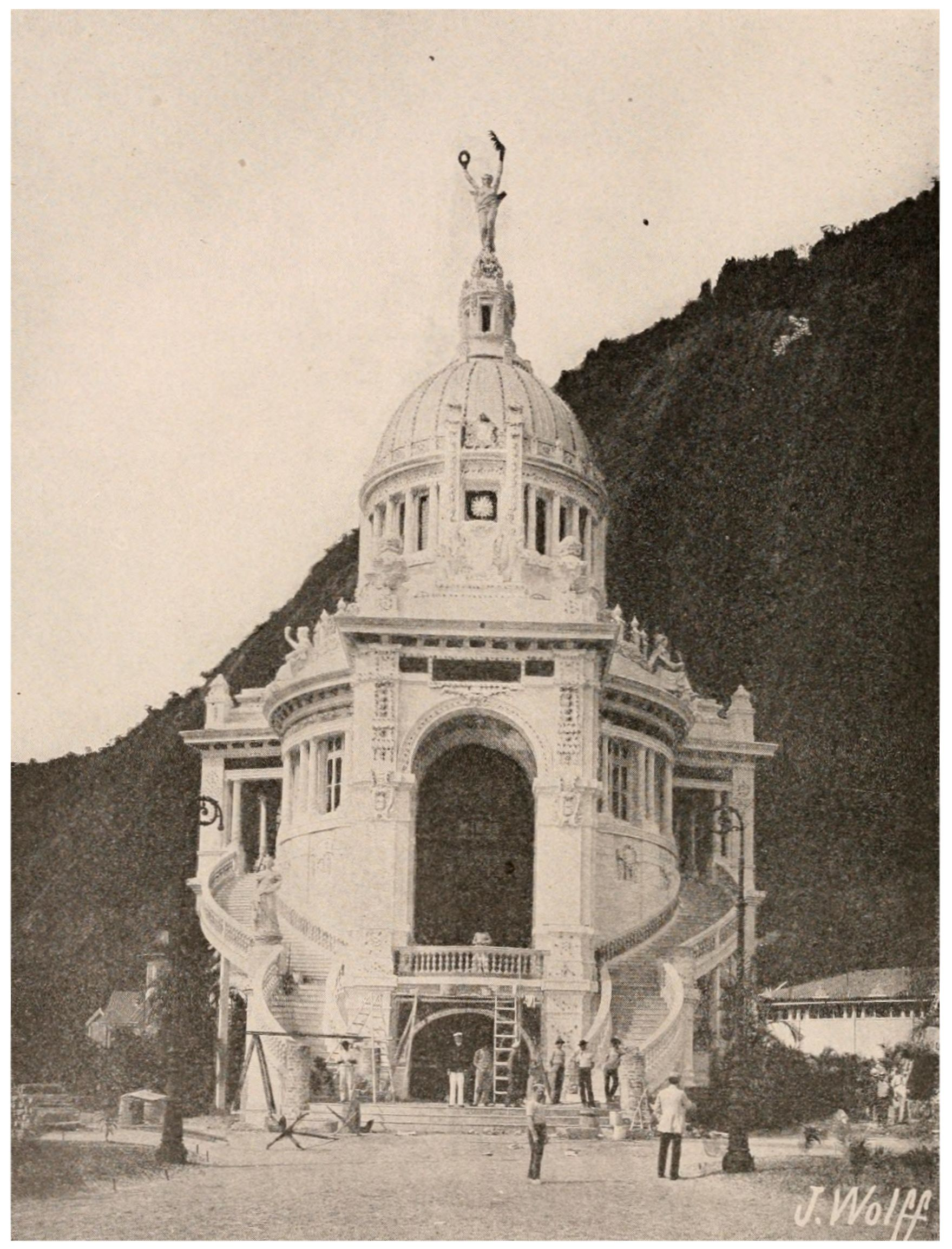
Bahia state pavilion
