= Exhibition of the Centenary of the Opening of the Ports of Brazil =

Exposição Nacional
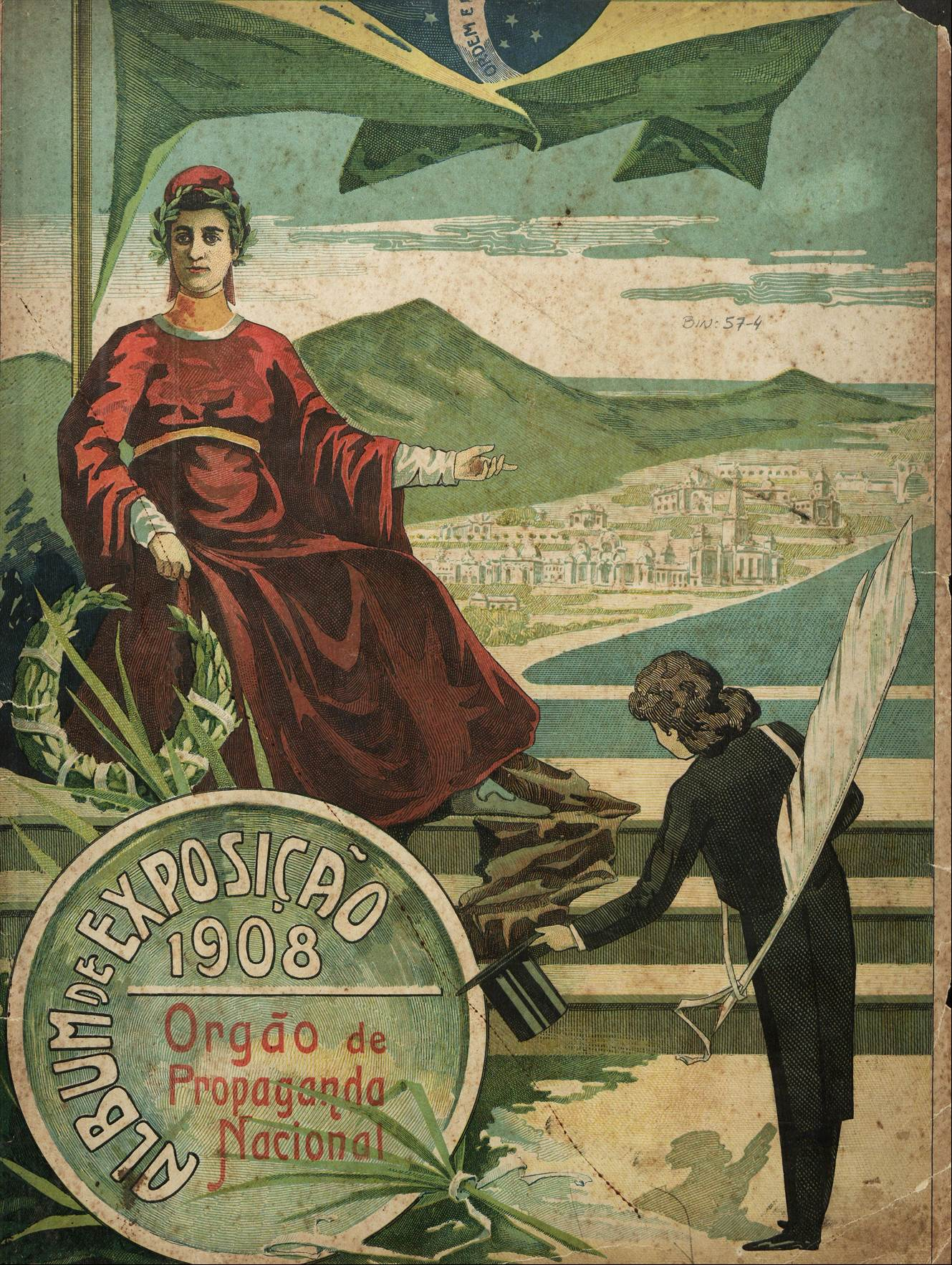

Overview
- BIE-class: Unrecognized exposition
- Name: Exposição Nacional
- Building(s): The pavilion of states building, now Earth Sciences Museum
- Area: 182,000 square metres (18.2 ha)
- Visitors: More than 1 million paying
- Organized by: Antônio Olinto dos Santos Pires, director and Augusto Ramos general co-ordinator

Participant(s)
- Countries: 2

Location
- Country: Brazil
- City: Rio de Janeiro
- Venue: Urca
- Coordinates: 22°57′11″S 43°10′05″W

Timeline
- Opening: 11 August 1908
- Closure: 15 November 1908

The national commemorative Exhibition of the Centenary of the Opening of the Ports of Brazil, also known as Brazilian National Exposition of 1908 or the National Exposition of Brazil at Rio de Janeiro, marked a hundred years since the opening of the Brazilian ports acelebrated Brazil's trade and development. It opened in Urca, Rio de Janeiro on 11 August, stayed open for 3 months and received over 1 million visitors.

== Location ==
The 41 person executive committee considered several locations in Rio de Janeiro, before selecting a 182,000 m^{2} site between Praia da Saudade and Praia Vermelha in Urca.

== Opening ==
The fair was opened (a month later than planned) by president Afonso Pena. The main entrance was through a hundred foot high illuminated gateway designed by René Barba. On arrival, the president was escorted from the Catete Palace to the opening gate by lancers from the 9th Cavalry Regiment, and then escorted by the exhibition's commissioners to the central palace while canons were fired and the national anthem was played.

== Pavilions ==
There were pavilions from Brazilian states of Bahia, São Paulo, Santa Catarina, Minas Gerais, and the Federal District of Brazil, along with a Portugal pavilion and ones for industry, Post and Telegraph, the Fire Department, a theater and a music pavilion.

=== Bahia state pavilion ===
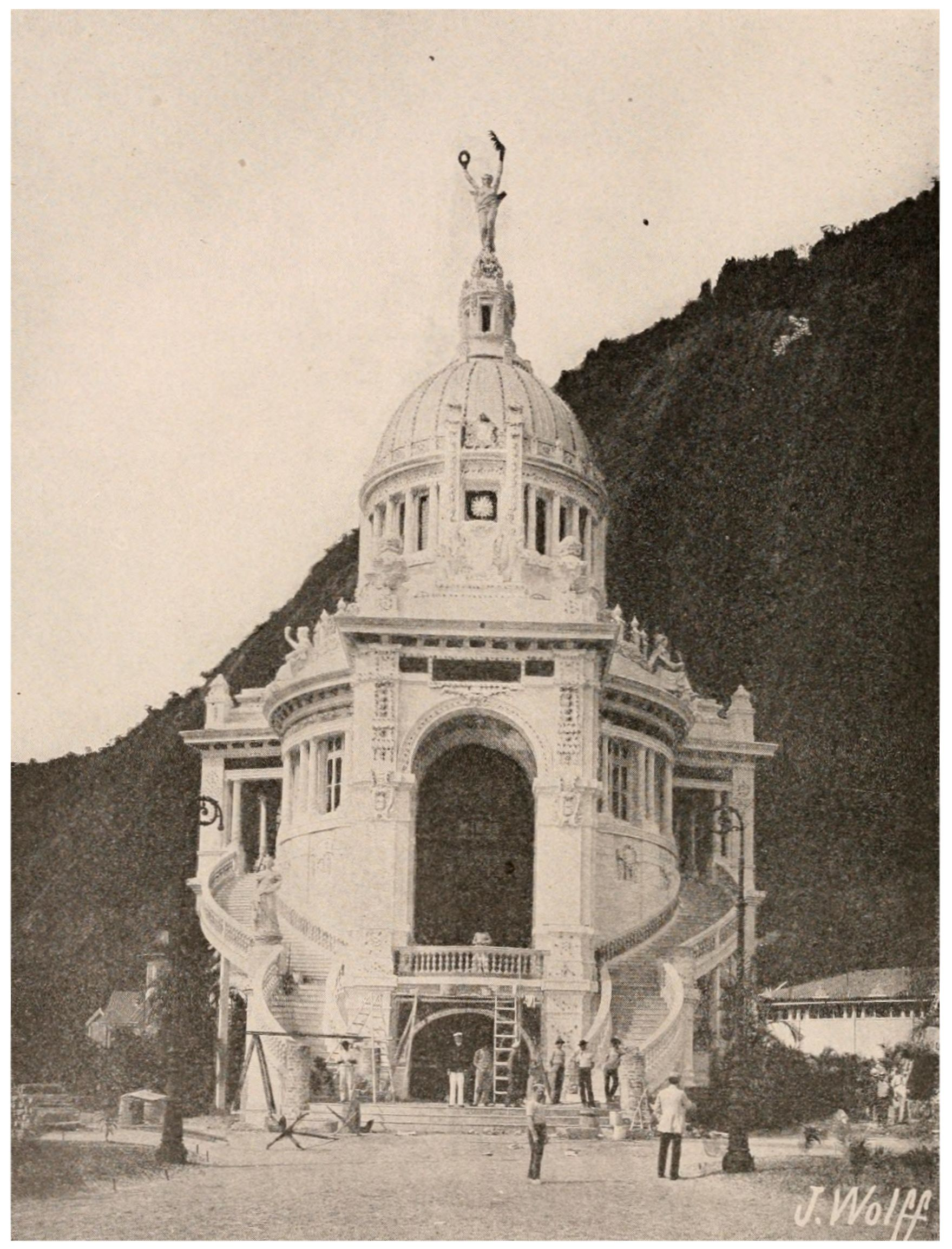
Bahia state pavilion

The Bahia pavilion, which occupied 54,359 square feet, was designed by Italian architect Rafael Rebecchi. Its displays included artwork by José Rodrigues Nunes, Bento Capinam, Macário, and Victor Meirelles, and its external sculpture was made by Rodolfo Bernardelli.

=== Minas Gerais state pavilion ===
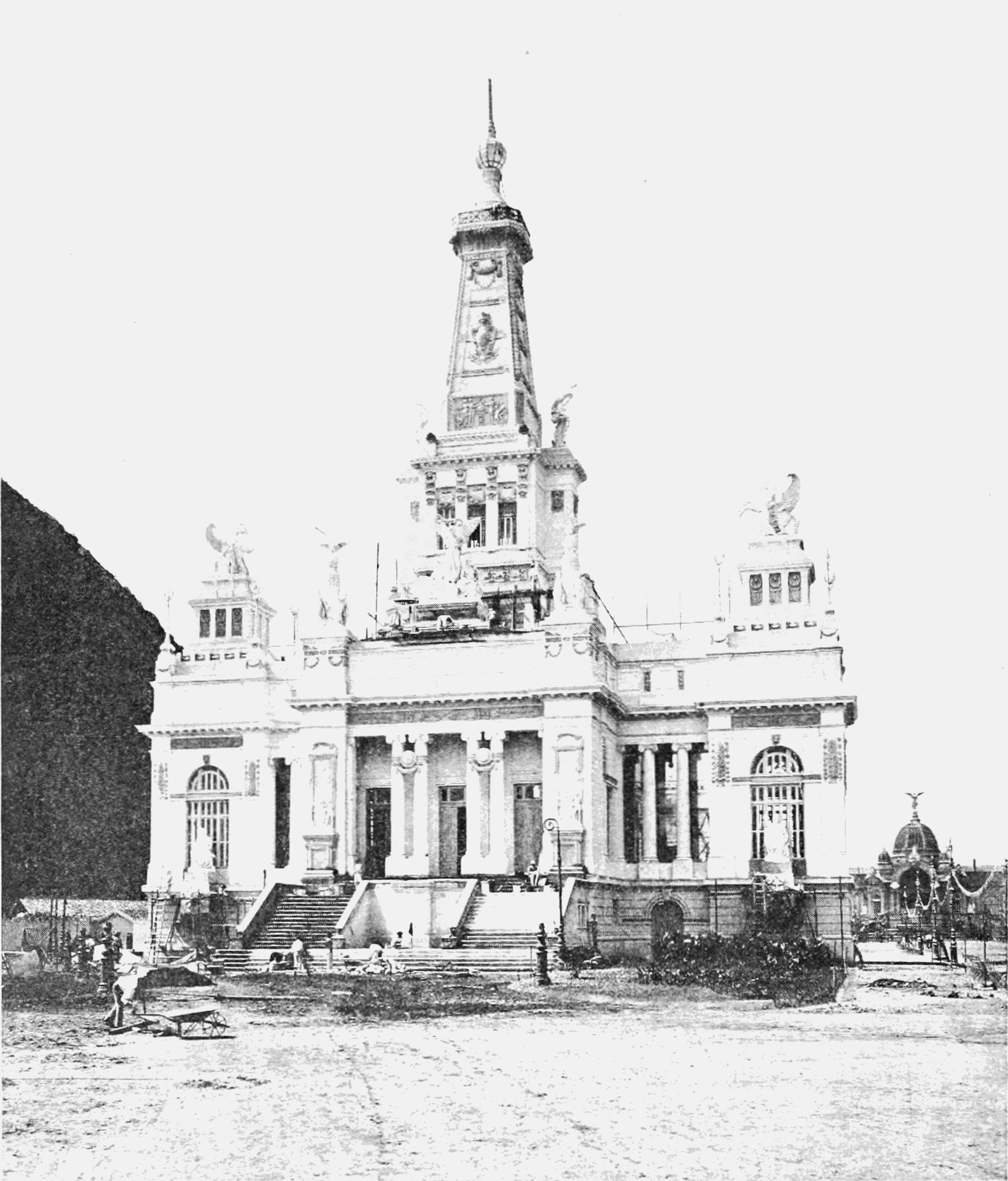
Minas Gerais state pavilion

The Minas Gerais pavilion was also designed by Rafael Rebecchi. It had interior murals by Crispim do Amaral including a series personifying agriculture, mineralogy, manufactures and the liberal arts. Exhibits included aspects of gold and diamond mining including a small quartz crushing machine and gold-washing machinery with washers and miners demonstrating the processes involved.

=== São Paulo state pavilion ===
The São Paulo state pavilion was designed by architect Ramos de Azevedo. Its commissioners were Carlos Botelho and Antonio Barros Barreto, and it covered about twenty thousand square feet.

=== Portugal pavilion ===
The Portugal pavilion building was provided by Brazil, designed by Francisco Isidro Monteiro, was inspired by the southern façade of the Jerónimos Monastery.

=== Industry pavilion ===
A military college on the site was converted to the industry pavilion for the expo (and afterwards was used by the 3rd Infantry Regiment).

=== States pavilion ===
This permanent building built for the exhibition, and is now the Earth Sciences Museum.

=== Bangu textiles factory building ===
The Bangu textiles factory (Fábrica de Tecidos Bangu) displayed its own woven materials.

=== Music pavilion ===
The music pavilion was designed by Jorge Lossio, decorated by Benedito Calixto and intended to have an Egyptian appearance.

== Other contents ==
There was a skating rink, a Botanical Garden, fountains, gardens and a small railroad for the public.

=== Botanic garden ===
The botanic garden was stocked by the Rio de Janeiro Botanical Garden and contained Brazilian flora, including palms, orchids and Amazon parasites, the Victoria Regia, Laelias, Sophonites, Epidendrums and hundreds of roses. It included a conservatory, lay between the Bahia and Santa Catharina pavilions and received a thousand visitors a day.

== Gallery ==
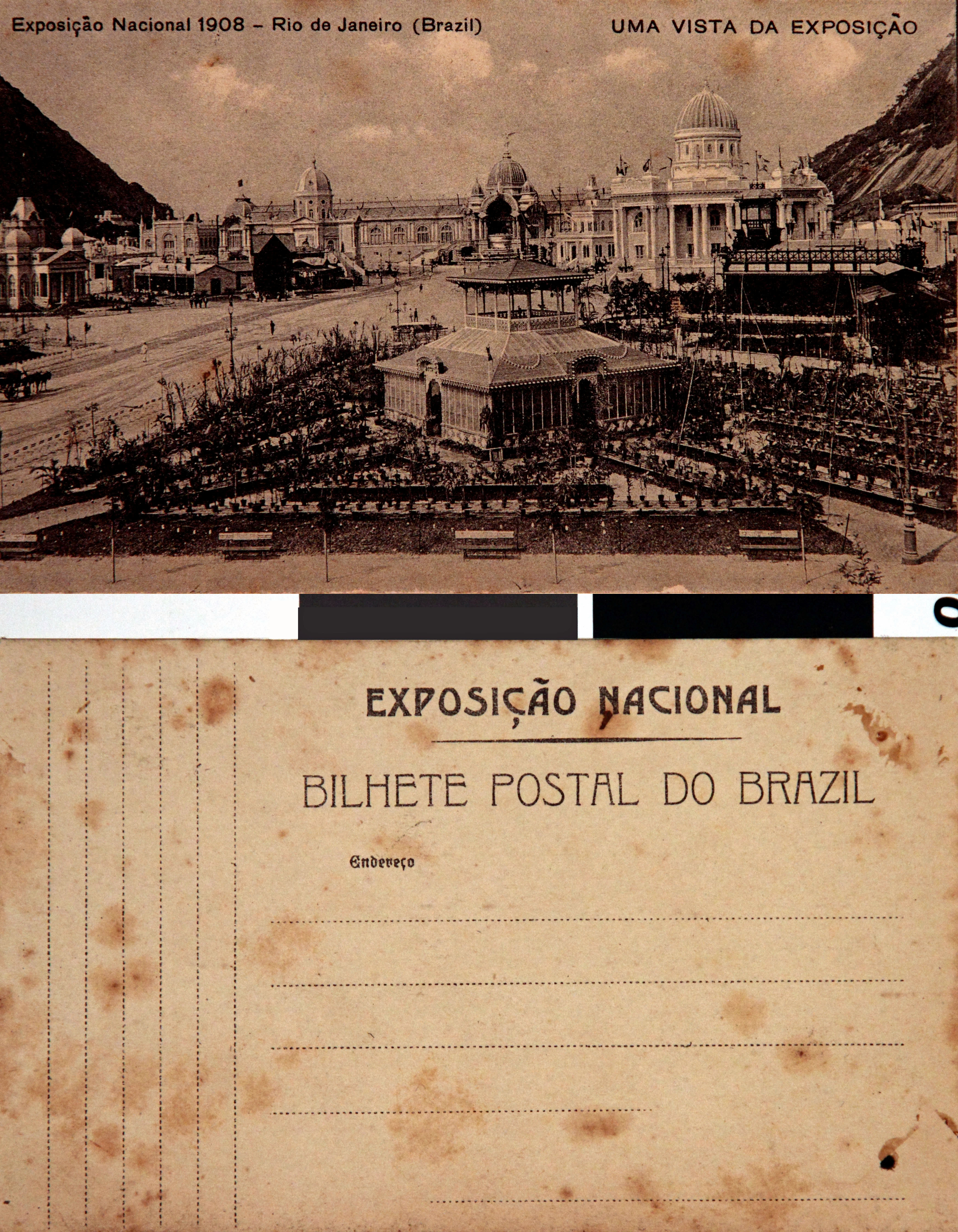
Postcard showing the botanic garden in the foreground

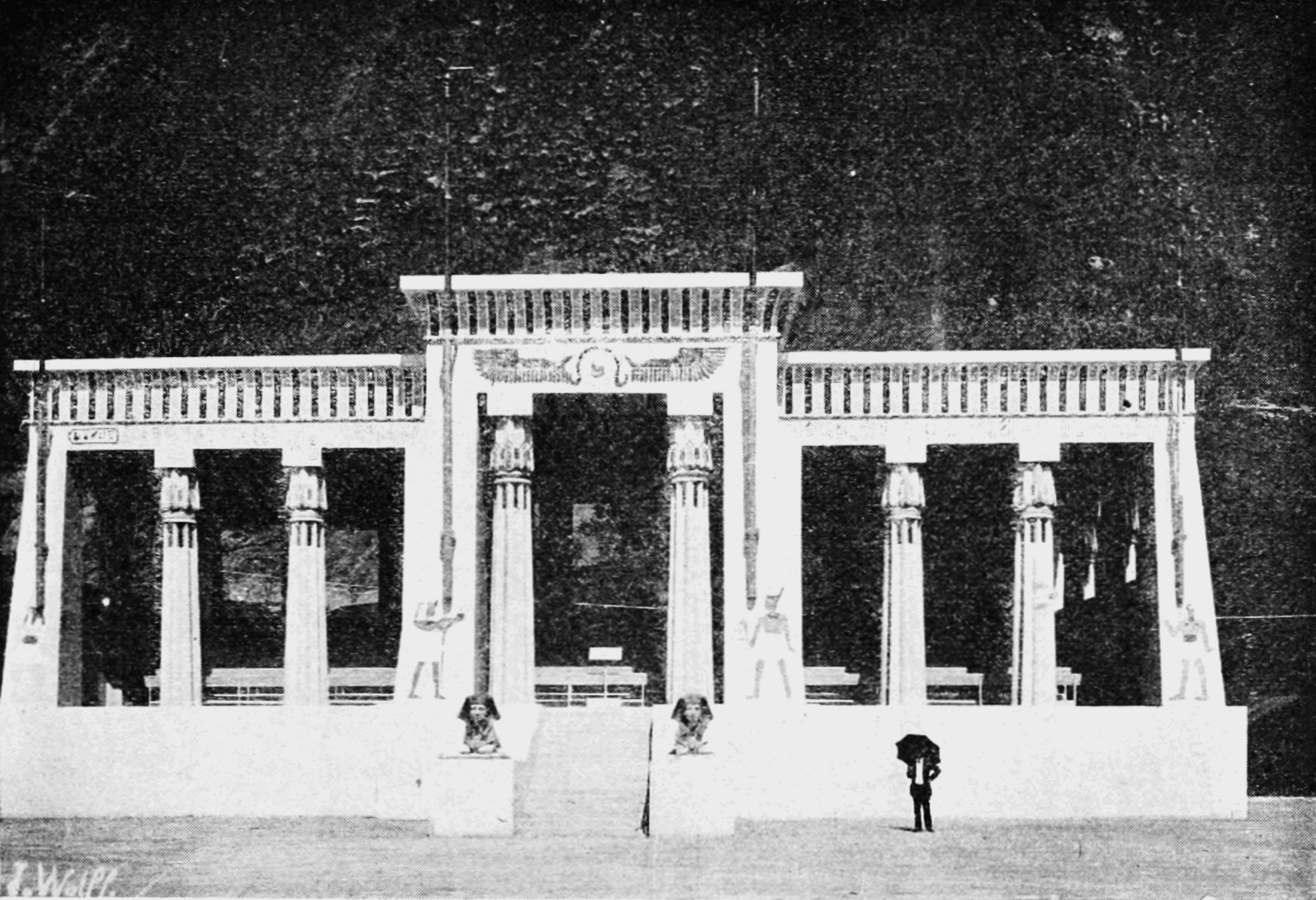
Music pavilion

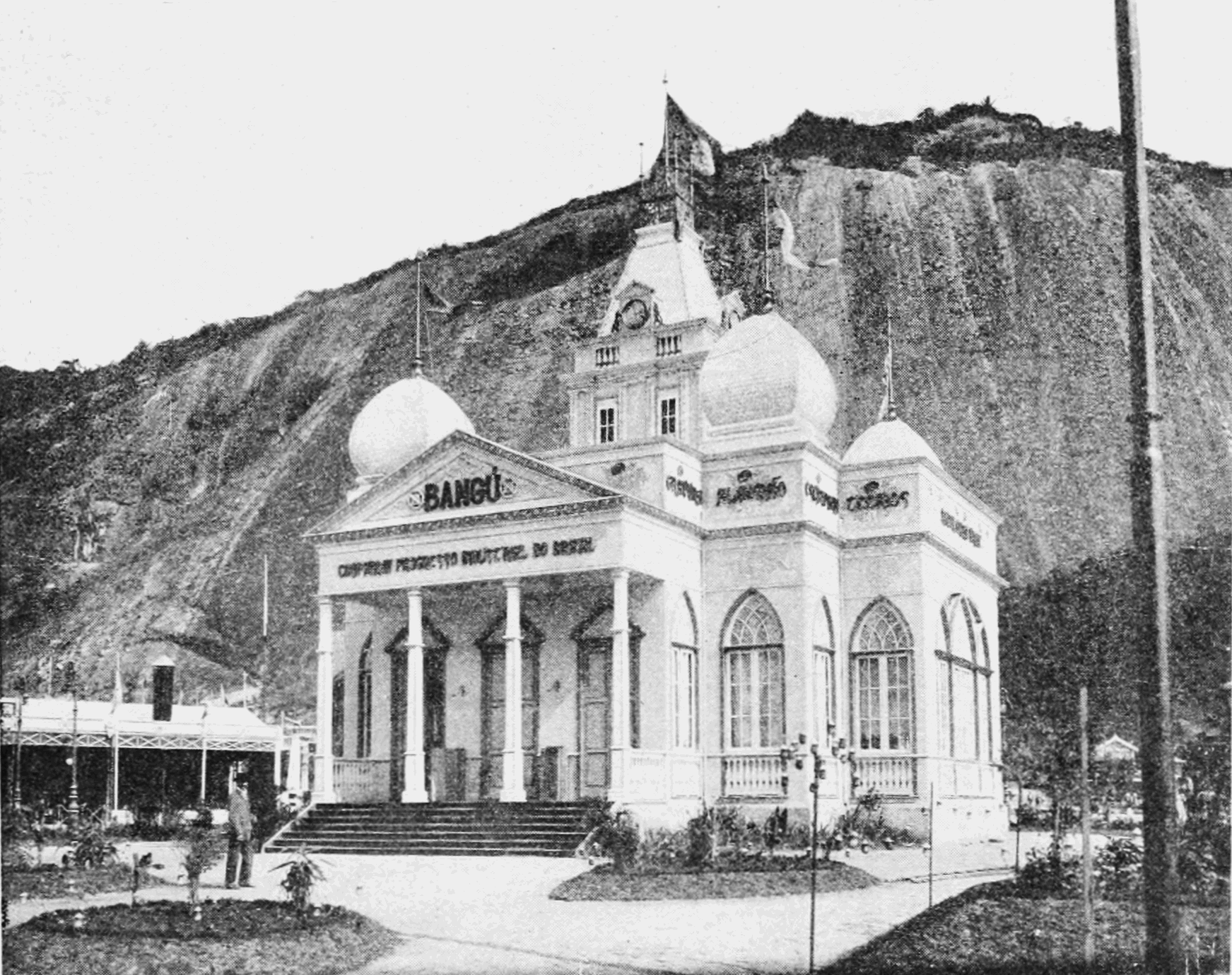
The Bangu factory building

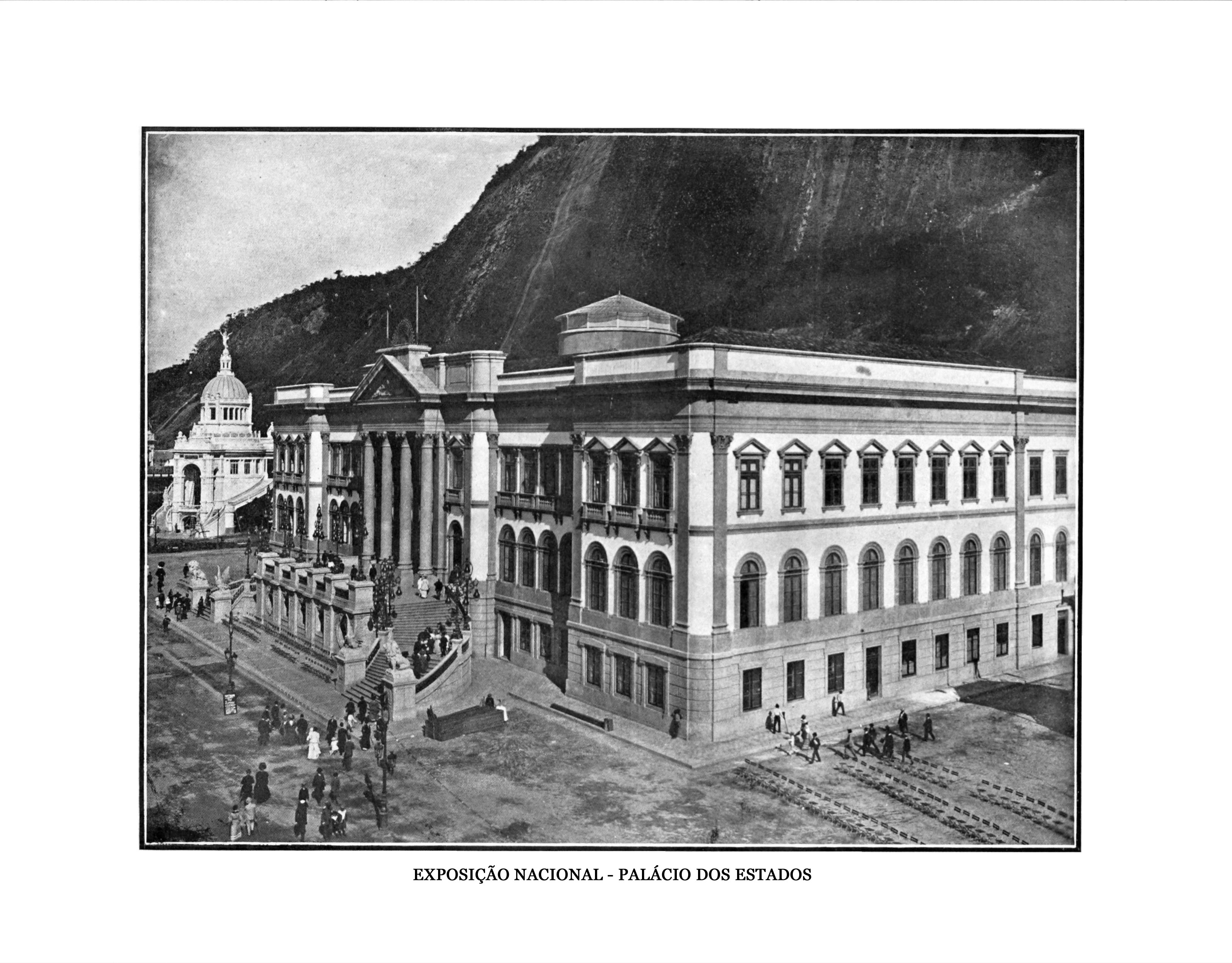
The States pavilion

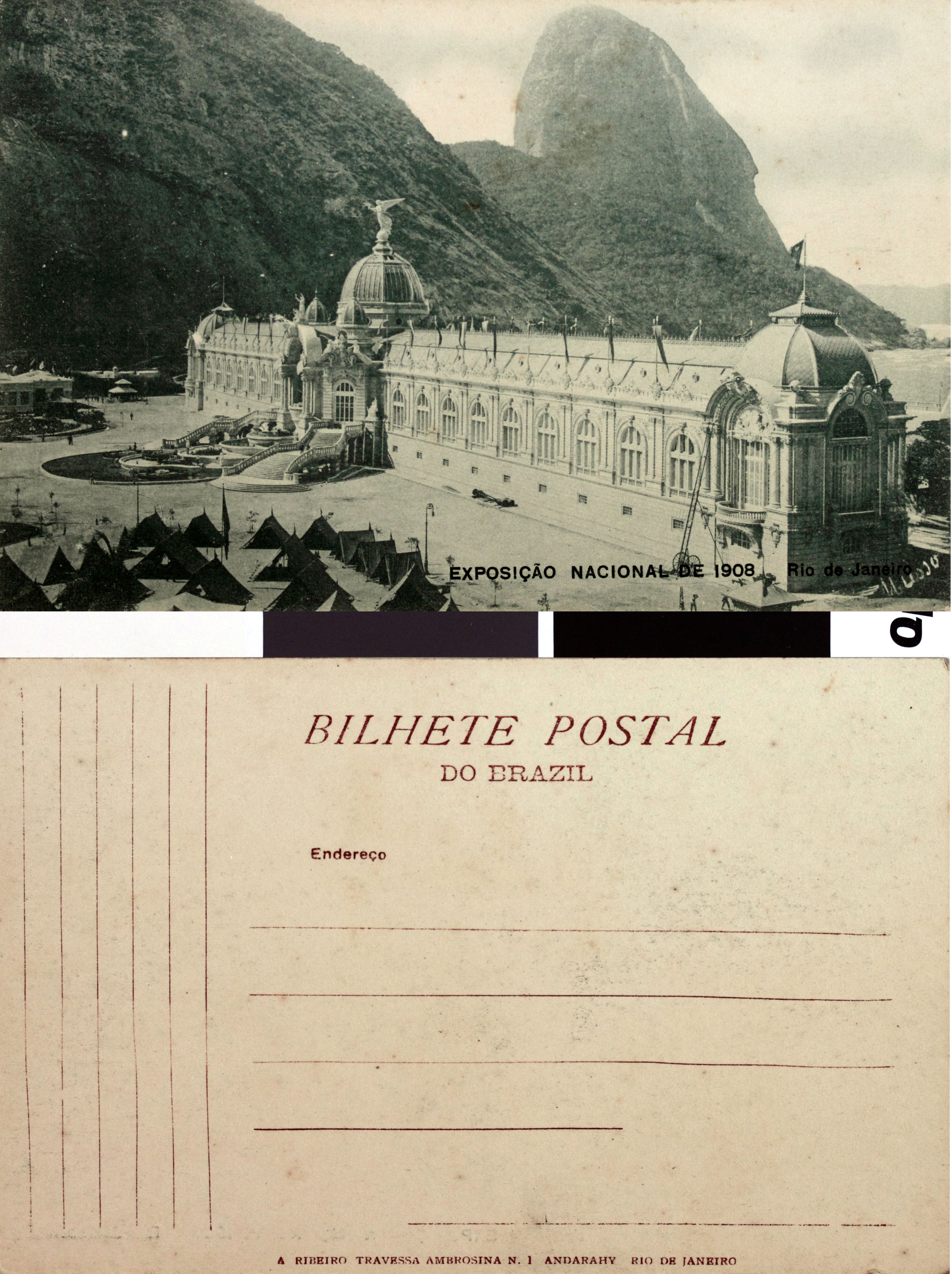
Postcard showing the industry pavilion

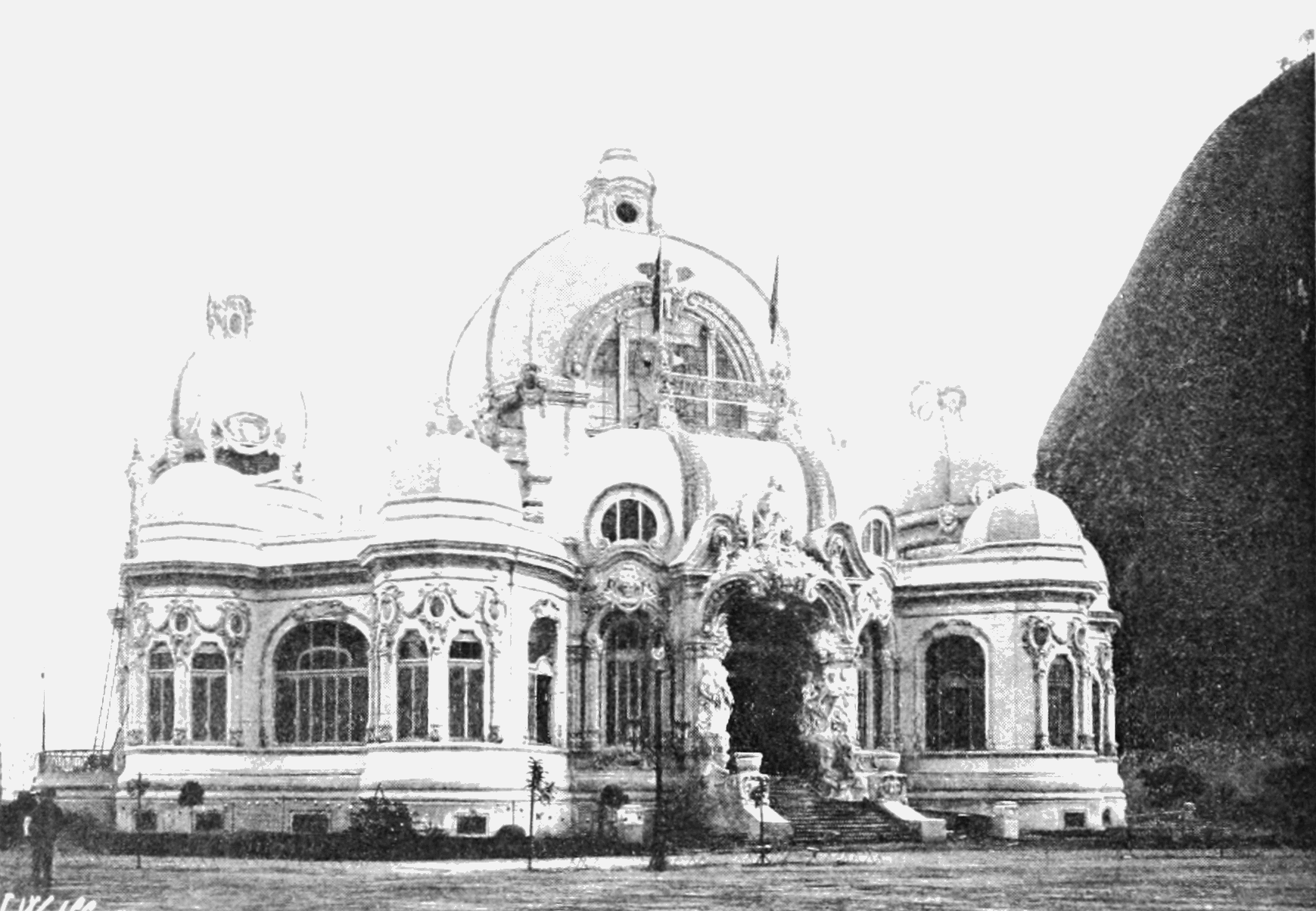
São Paulo state pavilion

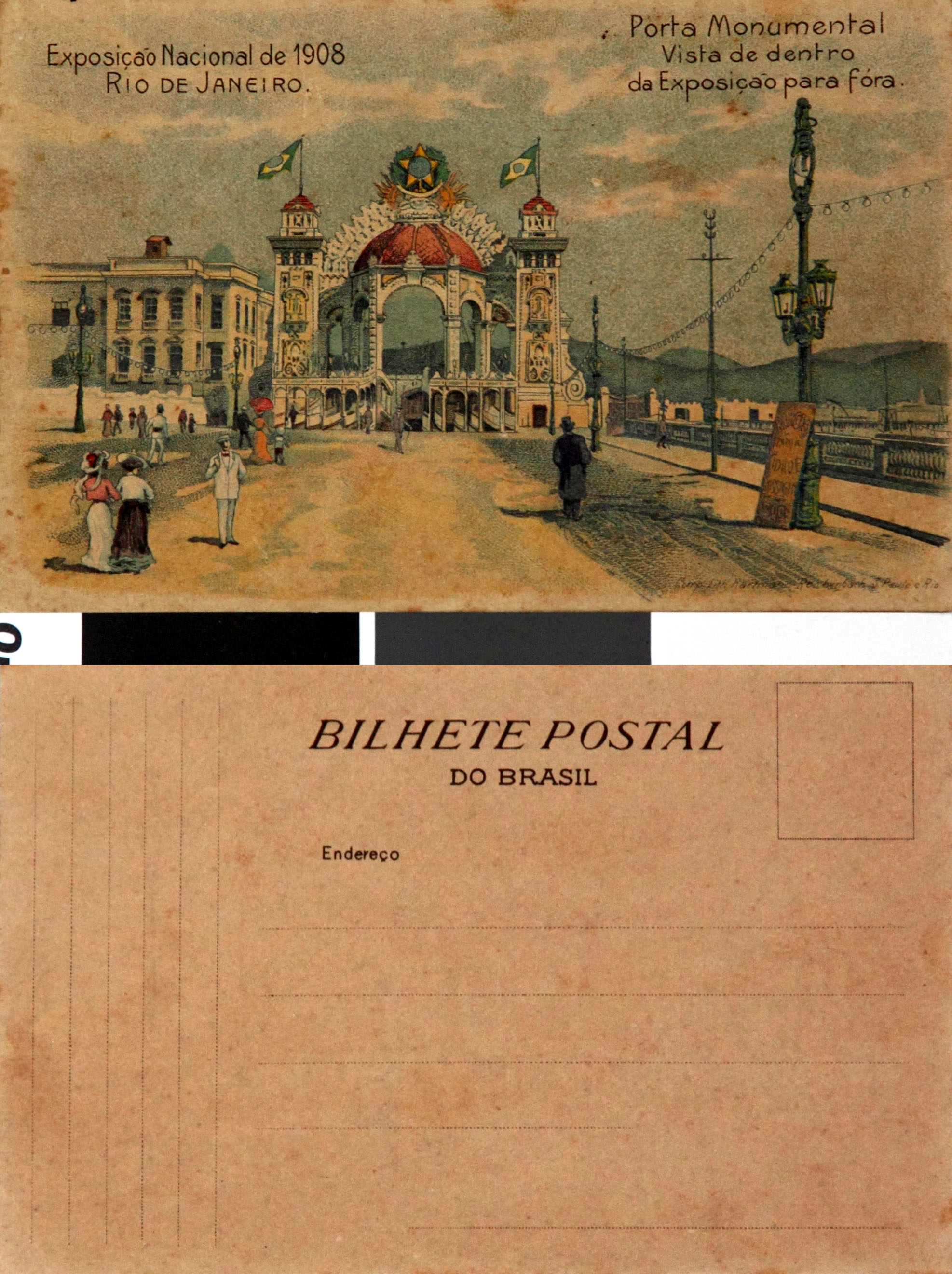
Postcard showing the entrance portal

== See also ==
- Transfer of the Portuguese Court to Brazil for Brazil's history in 1808 including the opening of the ports
