= Rebecchi =

Rebecchi is a surname. Notable people with the surname include:

- Carla Rebecchi (born 1984), Argentine field hockey player
- Jennifer Lee (born 1971), born Jennifer Michelle Rebecchi, American screenwriter and film director
- Mario Rebecchi (born 1983), Italian footballer
- Rafael Rebecchi, 19th century architect, mainly active in Rio de Janeiro

== Fictional characters ==
- Angie Rebecchi, a character in the Australian soap opera Neighbours
- Kevin Rebecchi, a character in the Australian soap opera Neighbours
- Stonefish Rebecchi, a character in the Australian soap opera Neighbours
- Toadfish Rebecchi, a character in the Australian soap opera Neighbours
- Nell Rebecchi, a character in the Australian soap opera Neighbours
