= Earth Sciences Museum =

Geological museum in Rio de Janeiro, Brazil

Coordinates: 22.9539°S 43.1702°W

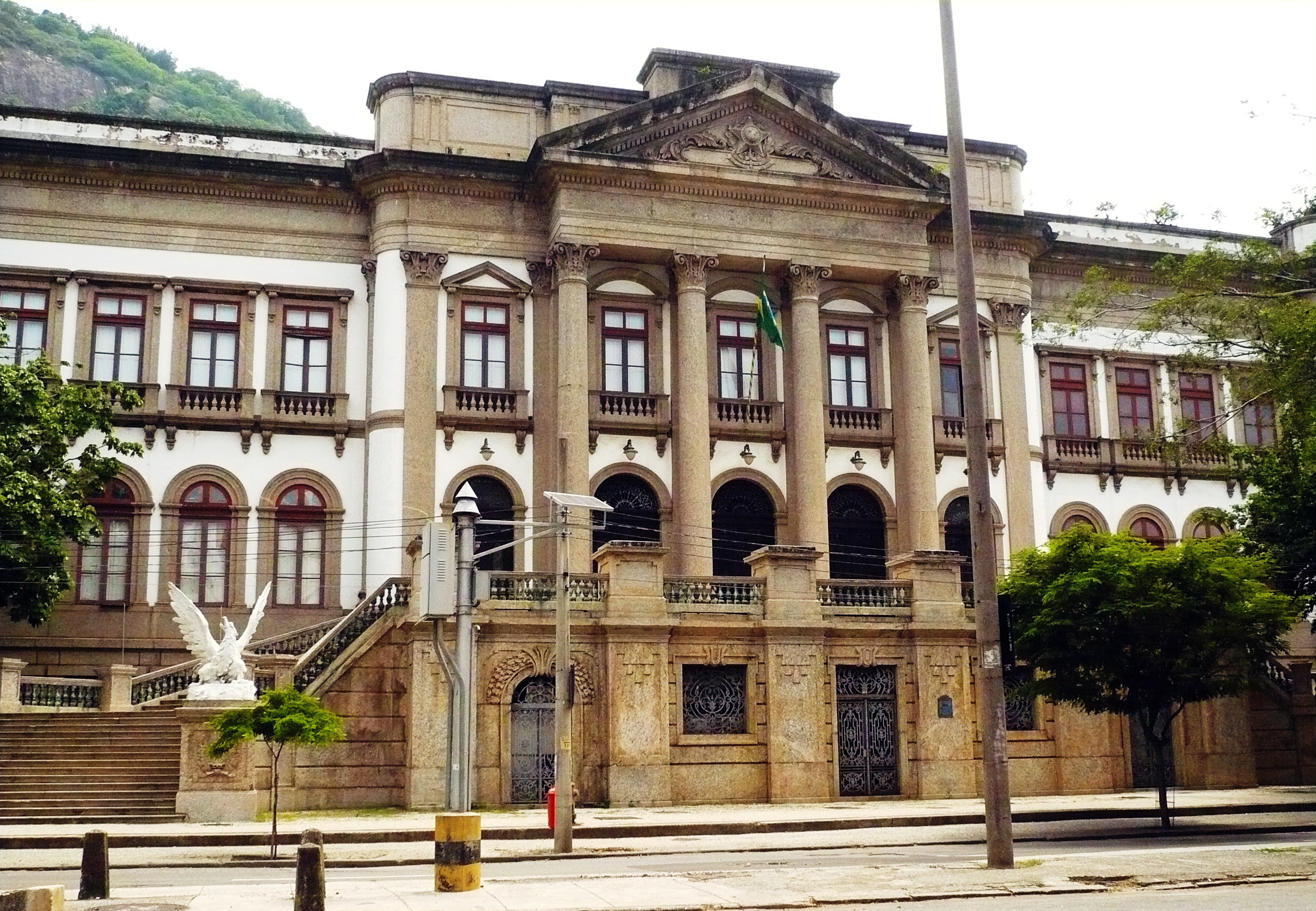
Façade of the museum (2009)

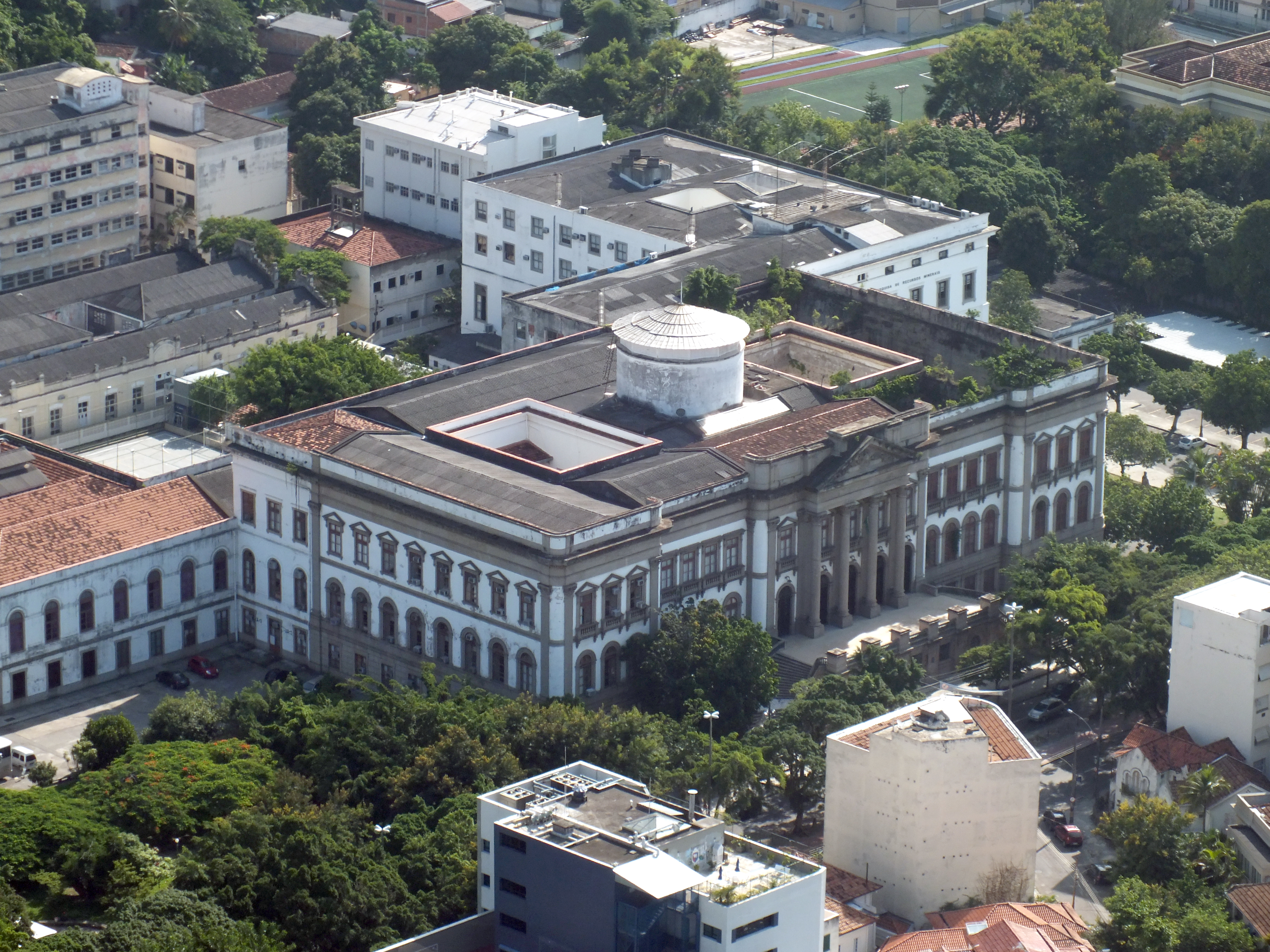
Aereal view of the museum in the Urca neighbourhood.

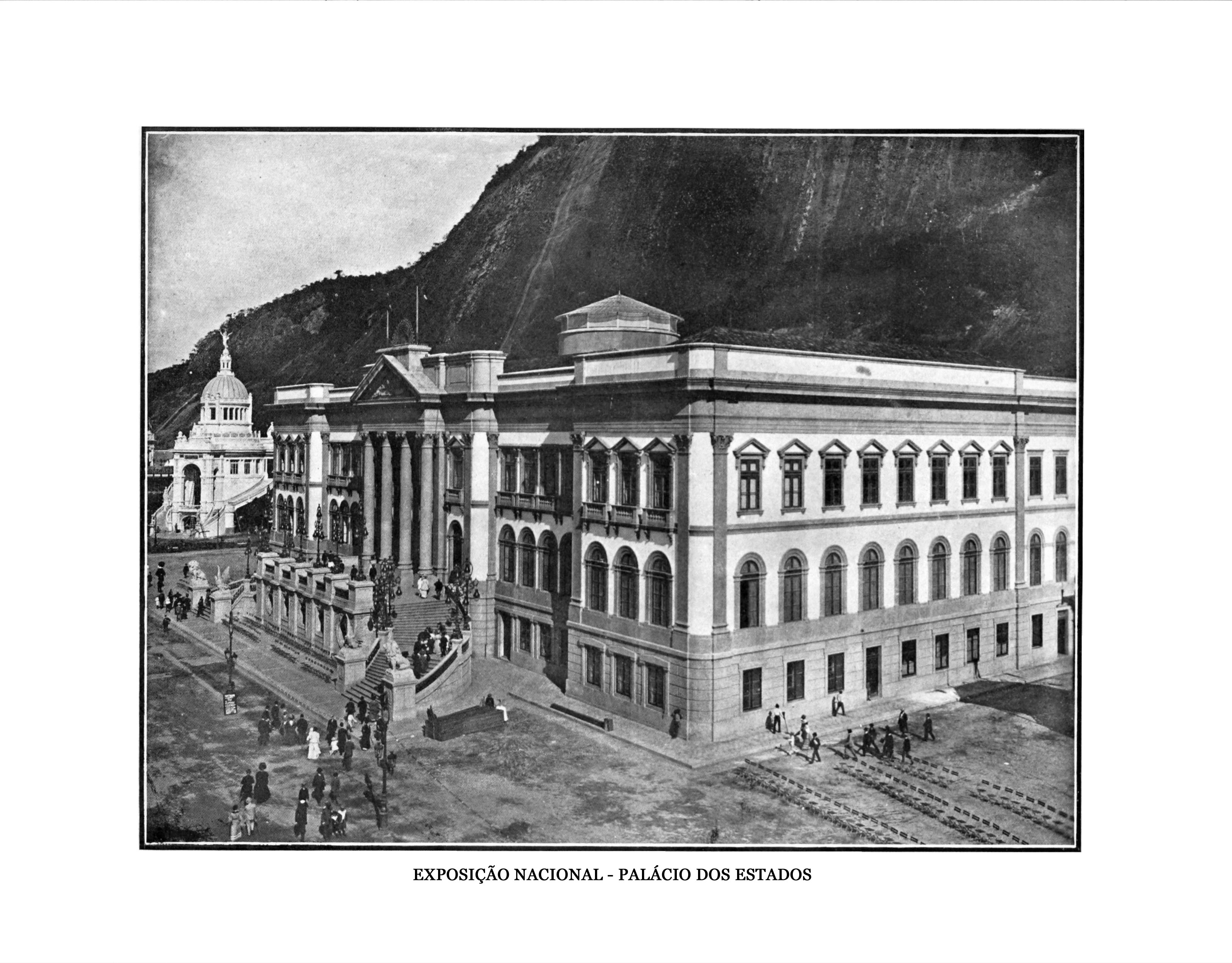
The States Pavilion at the National Exposition of Brazil, 1908

The Earth Sciences Museum (Museu de Ciências da Terra) is a geological museum in Rio de Janeiro, Brazil. The building was part of the Exhibition of the Centenary of the Opening of the Ports of Brazil in 1908. Its collection includes minerals, fossils, and geological exhibits. The building was constructed in 1907 for the National Exposition of Brazil and was intended to be permanent. At the exposition, it was the States Pavilion.
