= Crispim do Amaral =

Brazilian artist and journalist (1858–1911)

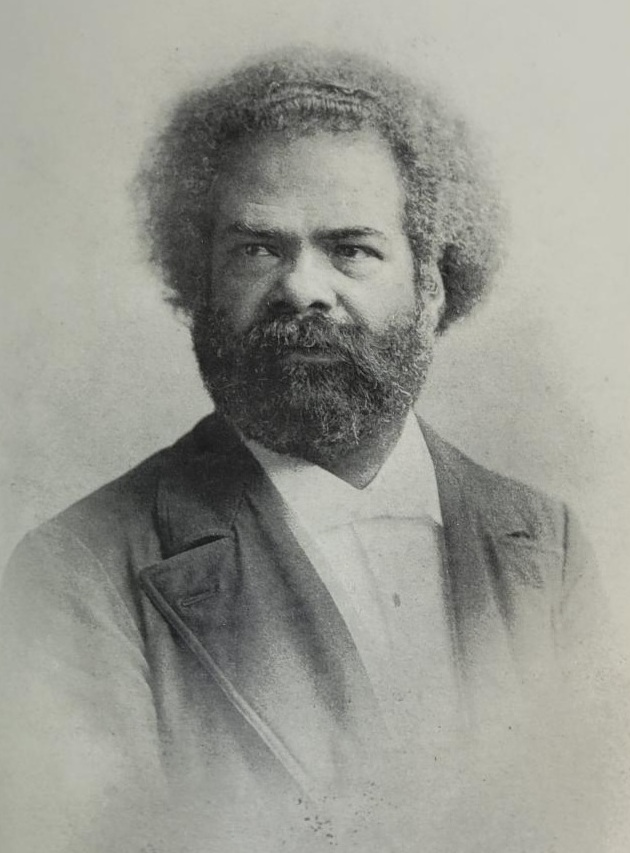
Portrait of Crispim do Amaral

Crispim do Amaral (1858 – 17 December 1911) was a Brazilian actor, decorator, journalist, painter, draftsman, illustrator, and caricaturist in Brazil.

He was born in Olinda.

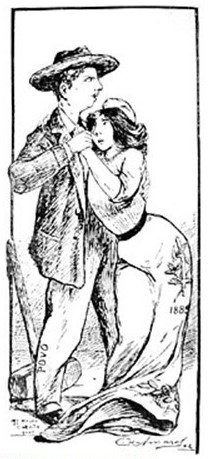
Caricature by Crispim do Amaral in O Malho

He edited The Courier in 1879 in Pará, being its illustrator. He traveled to Paris in 1888. Back in Brazil, he moved to Rio de Janeiro, where he founded the magazines O Malho, A Avenida, O Pau, and O Século.

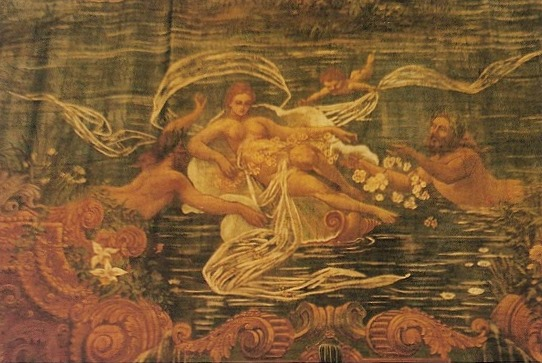
The Meeting of the Waters painting on the curtain of the Teatro Amazonas in Manaus

Amaral painted the curtain of the Amazon Theatre (debuted 1897) in Manaus titled "Meeting of the Waters".

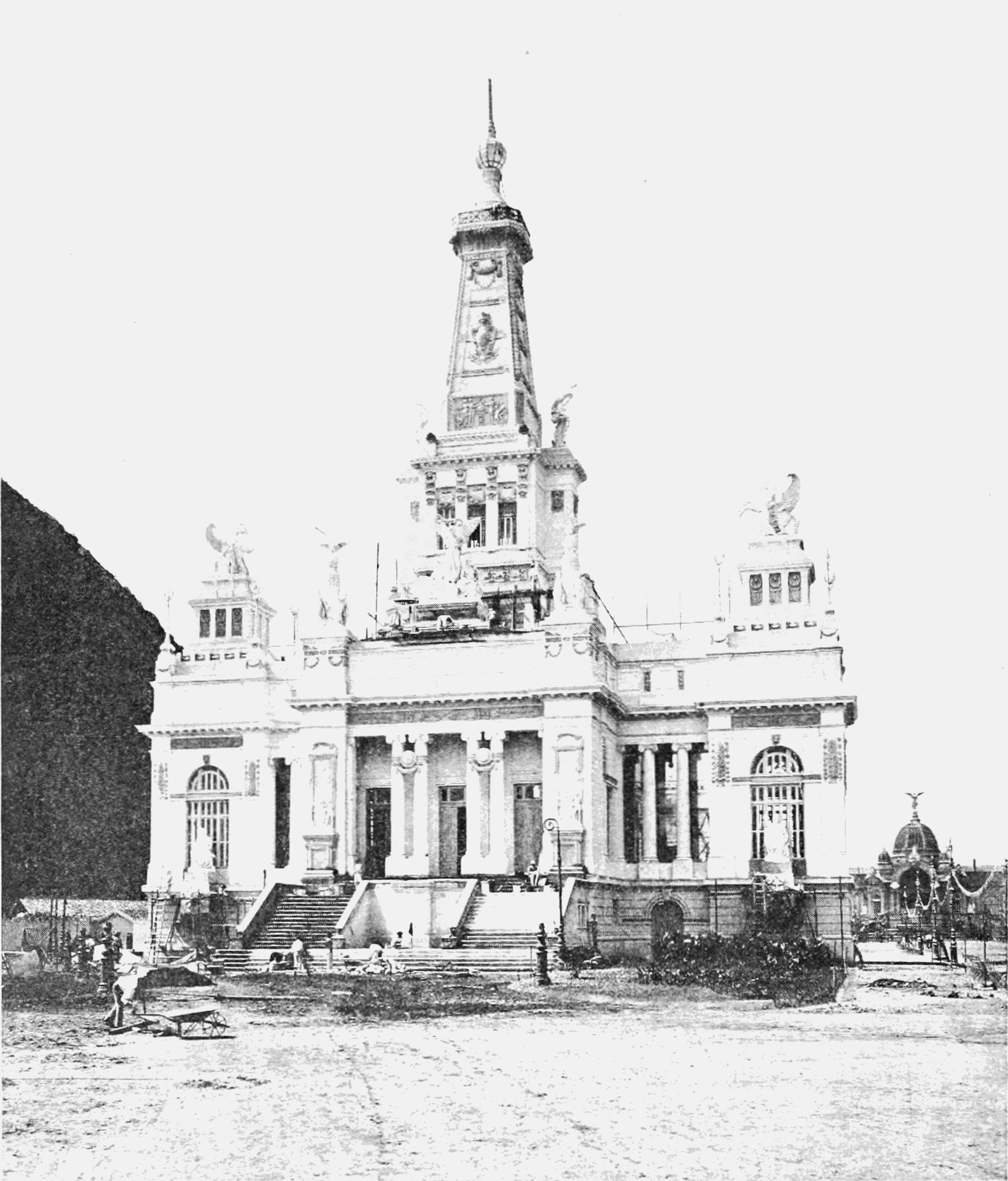
Minas Geraes state pavilion

At the Brazilian National Exposition of 1908, he painted the interior murals of the Minas Geraes state pavilion including a series of images personifying agriculture, mineralogy, manufactures and the liberal arts. The building was designed by Rafael Rebecchi. Exhibits at the pavilion included aspects of gold and diamond mining.

He died in Rio de Janeiro.
