= Church of Saint Peter of the Clergymen =

Roman Catholic church in Bahia, Brazil

- Igreja de São Pedro dos Clérigos
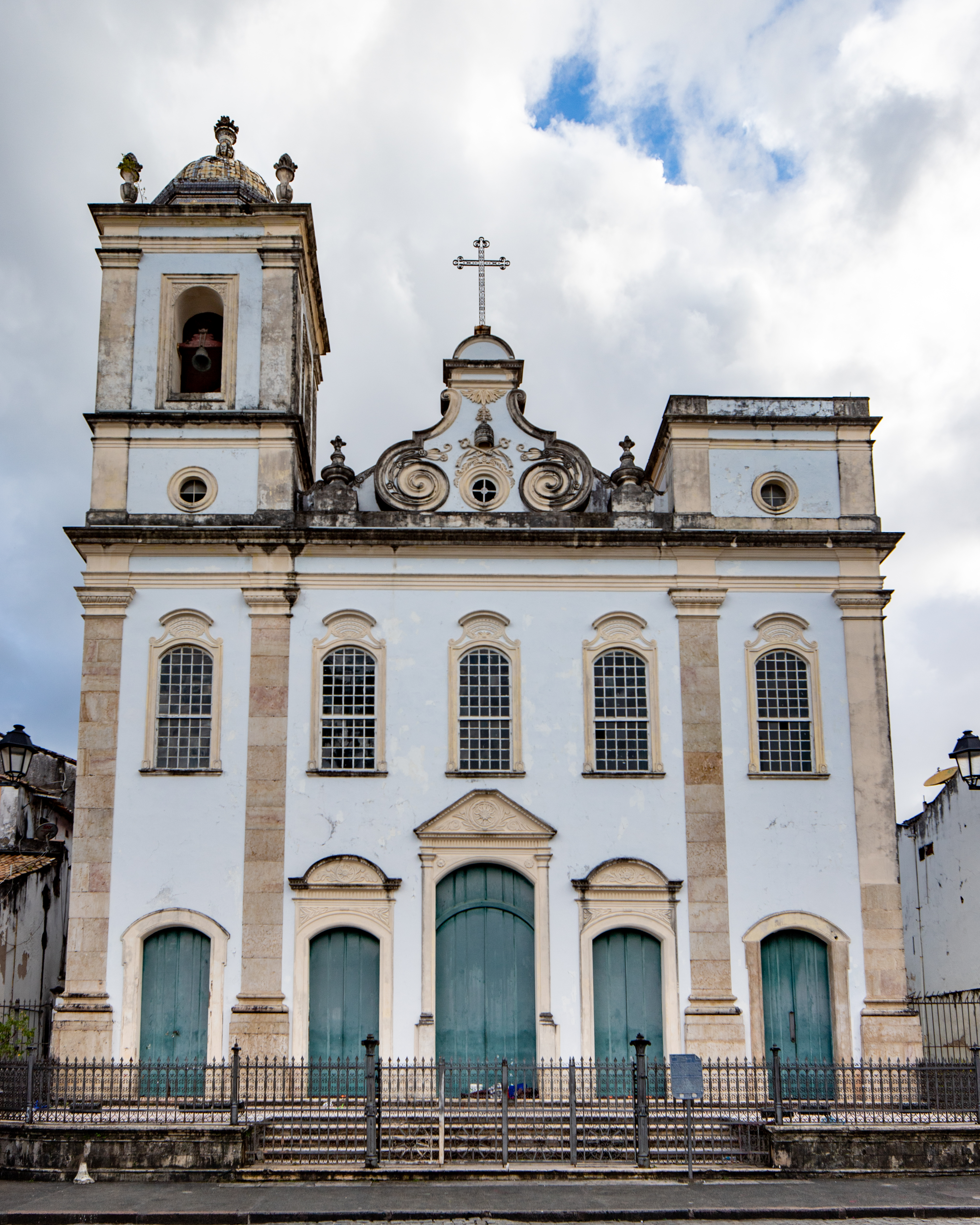
- Church of Saint Peter of the Clergymen

- Location of the Church of Saint Peter of the Clergymen in Brazil

Religion
- Affiliation: Catholic
- Rite: Roman

Location
- Municipality: Salvador
- State: Bahia
- Country: Brazil
- Interactive map of Church of Saint Peter of the Clergymen
- Coordinates: 12.97292°S 38.50940°W

Architecture
- Completed: 1709

National Historic Heritage of Brazil
- Designated: 1941
- Reference no.: 273

The Church of Saint Peter of the Clergymen (Portuguese: Igreja de São Pedro dos Clérigos) is an 18th-century Roman Catholic church in Salvador, Bahia, Brazil. It was constructed by the Brotherhood of Saint Peter in approximately 1709 and was renovated in the 18th and 19th centuries. The church was listed as a historic structure by National Institute of Historic and Artistic Heritage (IPHAN) in 1938 and is part of the Historic Center of Salvador UNESCO World Heritage Site.

== History ==
The Brotherhood of Saint Peter is one of the oldest in Brazil; its chapter was established in 1553 by Dom Pero Fernandes Sardinha (1496–1556), the first bishop of Brazil. The brotherhood built a hermitage and small chapel in Salvador near the Archbishop's Palace in the late 17th century. It was demolished in 1708 when the Brotherhood was granted land owned by the Jesuits by the Archbishop of Salvador Sebastião Monteiro da Vida; the Jesuits needed the site of the hermitage to build a curving lower walkway to connect the Sé Cathedral and the Archbishop's Palace. The Sé Cathedral and its lower walkway were demolished in 1933, leaving only the Archbishop's Palace.

The construction of the first church of the Brotherhood of Saint Peter began in 1709. Little is known about the period of construction of the church, as the archives of the Brotherhood remain sealed. The structure had fallen into ruin and required renovation by 1741, as stated in a Royal decree of the period. The frontispiece was replaced by one in the late Rococo style in 1887. The plan of the church was enlarged in the same year with the addition of a sacristy.

The church housed priests passing through Salvador from its early history. This function was transferred to the Church and Hospice of Our Lady of the Good Journey, which continued to house travelling clergy until the 1970s. The roof was repaired, the facade was cleaned, and the interior renovated in the 1940s.

== Structure ==
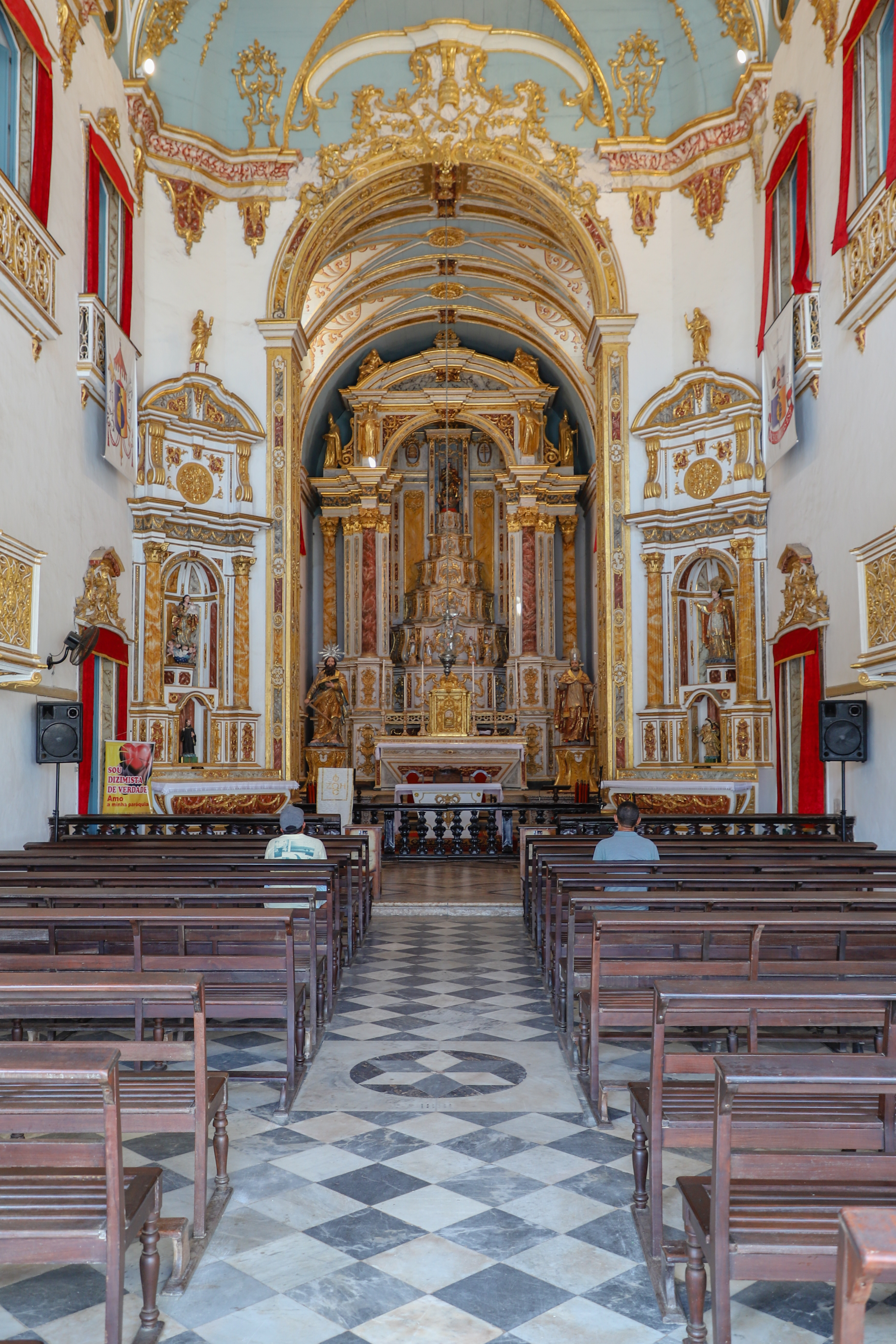
View of the nave and chancel

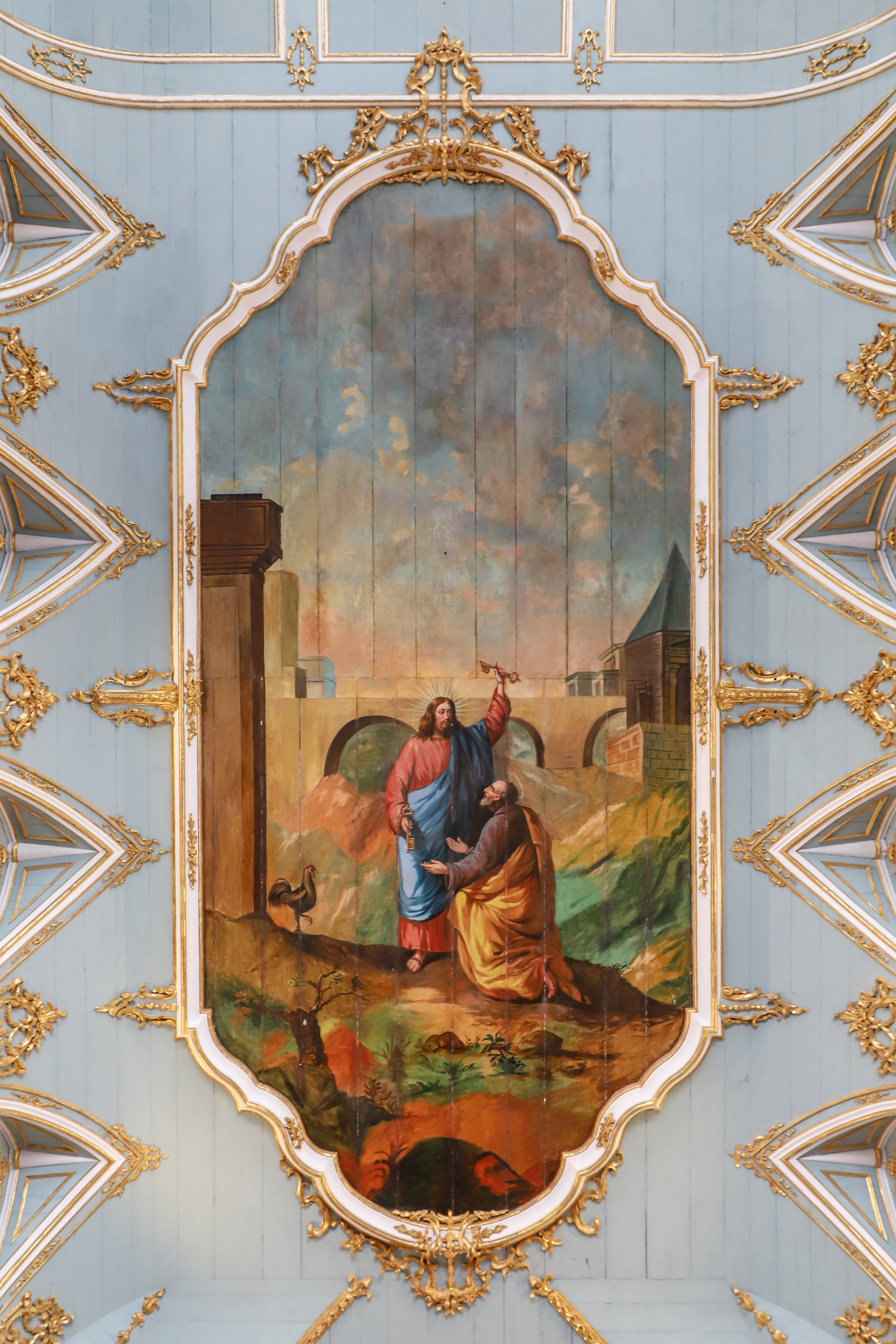
Ceiling painting attributed to José Rodrigues Nunes (1800–1881)

The Church of Saint Peter of the Clergymen was built in the tradition of Bahian churches of the 18th century, with a single nave and lateral corridors surmounted by tribunes. It lacks the transverse sacristy of other churches of the period. The exterior is of stone masonry and brick and opens directly onto the Terreiro de Jesus. A small church yard is of stone and is enclosed by an iron fence. A planned right-hand bell tower was never constructed. The interior of the church has a nave, lateral corridors, chancel, sacristy, choir, ossuary, meeting room, and miscellaneous smaller rooms. The decor of the interior of the church represents the transition between the both Rococo and Neoclassical styles in Bahia.

=== Chancel and high altar ===
The high altar follows the design of the Italian Jesuit artist Andrea Pozzo (1642–1709). It is complemented by two altars at the corner of the chancel arch. Polychromatic marble is richly used in both the floor and elements of the high altar. An image of Our Lady of the Conception is at center of the high altar. A life-size statue of Saint Peter in full papal costume is placed to the right of the high altar; and image of Saint Paul is to the left. The church also has images of Santa Luzia, Saint Amaro, Saint Eligius, and Our Lady of the Gate of Heaven. The high altar and two side altars are in the Neoclassical style, with no trace of the baroque. And image of Our Lady of the Conception is at center of the high altar, and images of Saint Paul and Saint Peter below.

=== Ceiling painting ===
The painting on the ceiling of the nave depicts the Confession of Peter from the Book of Matthew; the scene is a reference to Matthew 16 where Jesus says "[a]nd I will give unto thee the keys of the kingdom of heaven: and whatsoever thou shalt bind on earth shall be bound in heaven: and whatsoever thou shalt loose on earth shall be loosed in heaven." The painting is attributed to José Rodrigues Nunes (1800–1881), the only named artist to work in the church; no written record of his on the nave ceiling painting exists, other than by oral tradition. The painting sits within a medallion with gilt tracings, in contrast to Baroque nave paintings in Bahia that cover the length of the ceiling. The nave ceiling has triangular vaults with elaborate gilt tracings above each opening to the tribune; each vault has an oval painting of an early benefactor of the church within.

== Protected status ==
The Church of Saint Peter of the Clergymen was listed as a historic structure by the National Institute of Historic and Artistic Heritage in 1941. It was listed in the Book of Historical Works, Inscription 168 and 254-A; and the Book of Fine Arts, Inscription fls 54. Both directives are dated September 9, 1941.

== Access ==
The Church of Saint Peter of the Clergymen is open to the public and may be visited. The feast days of Saints Peter and Paul are on June 29 and 30, and are likely the important celebration days of the church.
