= Bento José Rufino Capinam =

Brazilian painter

Bento José Rufino Capinam, whose given name was Bento José Rufino da Silva, (1791 – 1874) was a painter in Brazil. His work was displayed at the National Exposition of Brazil at Rio de Janeiro in 1908. His works are in the Sao Paulo Museum of Art and Museu Nacional de Belas Artes.

His work included art on funeral invitations. He produced historical artwork for the Bahia pavilion at the 1908 Exhibition in Brazil.
