= José Rodrigues Nunes =

Brazilian painter (1800–1881)

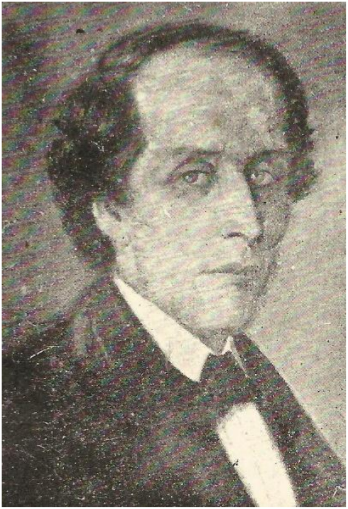
- José Rodrigues Nunes, painted by his son
- Born: Salvador, Bahia, Brazil; 11 April 1800
- Died: 27 November 1881 (aged 81); Salvador, Bahia, Brazil
- Known for: painter, set designer
- Style: Baroque, Rococo

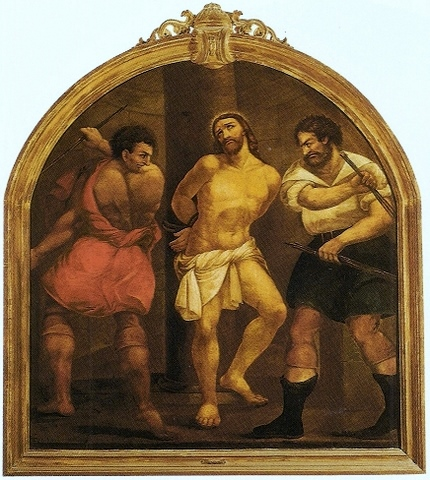
A flagelação, Museu de Arte da Bahia, Salvador, Bahia, Brazil

José Rodrigues Nunes (11 April 1800 – 27 November 1881) was a Brazilian artist who worked primarily in Salvador, Bahia. He was primarily a painter, but also worked in the fields of decoration, restoration, and set design. He was a student of Franco Velasco (1780–1833) and is the final painter of the Bahian School of Painting (Portuguese: Escola Baiana de Pintura).

Nunes taught drawing at Liceu Provincial de Salvador between 1837 and 1859. His students included Olímpio Pereira da Mata, Macário José da Rocha, João Francisco Lopes Rodrigues (1825–1893), Francisco da Silva Romão, and his son, Francisco Rodrigues Nunes. In addition to being a teacher, he worked as a scenographer at the São José Theater (Portuguese: Teatro São José) for many years. He is considered one of the representatives of the final phase of Bahian colonial painting. A series of paintings by Nunes is part of the personal collection of the Bahian physician Jonathas Abbot (1796–1868). He also produced portraits of Bahian religious figures and politicians.

== Works ==
Nunes carried out several works, including:

- Paintings of the Church of Nosso Senhor do Bonfim, assistant to Franco Velasco, 1818-1820
- Ceiling painting of the nave of the Church of the Third Order of São Francisco, completing the work of Franco Velasco in 1833, and produced ten additional paintings in the same church in 1834; his painting of the Madonna is stylized after a work of the Benedictine friar Estêvão do Loreto
- Paintings for the Church of Saint Peter of the Clergymen, 1839
- Side panels of the nave of the Church of the Blessed Sacrament at Rua do Passo, 1860; and paintings of The Passion of Christ (Ceia do Senhor) and the Transfiguration of Christ (Transfiguracao de Cristo), 1855
