= List of World Heritage Sites in Brazil =

Locations of World Heritage Sites in Brazil. Green dots indicate the sites of the Central Amazon Conservation Complex, blue dots are the two sites of the Cerrado, and yellow dots are the two Amazonia Theaters. Atlantic Forest South-East Reserves comprise 25 and Discovery Coast Atlantic Forest Reserves eight, approximate locations are shown. Valongo Wharf and Sítio Roberto Burle Marx are located in Rio de Janeiro.

The United Nations Educational, Scientific and Cultural Organization (UNESCO) World Heritage Sites are places of importance to cultural or natural heritage as described in the UNESCO World Heritage Convention, established in 1972. Cultural heritage consists of monuments (such as architectural works, monumental sculptures, or inscriptions), groups of buildings, and sites (including archaeological sites). Natural features (consisting of physical and biological formations), geological and physiographical formations (including habitats of threatened species of animals and plants), and natural sites which are important from the point of view of science, conservation or natural beauty, are defined as natural heritage. Brazil accepted the convention on 1 September 1977, making its sites eligible for inclusion on the list.

There are 26 World Heritage Sites in Brazil, and further 18 sites on its tentative list. The first site in Brazil, the Historic Town of Ouro Preto, was inscribed on the list at the 4th Session of the World Heritage Committee, held in Paris, France in 1980. The most recent site, the Amazonia Theaters, was inscribed in 2026. Among the 26 sites, 16 are listed for their cultural significance. Nine sites are listed for their natural significance, and one site, Paraty and Ilha Grande - Culture and Biodiversity, is listed for both. One site is transnational: the Jesuit Missions Guaranis is shared with Argentina. From 1999 to 2001, Iguaçu National Park was listed as endangered due to an illegally opened road through the park, dams on the river, and helicopter flights. Brazil has served on the World Heritage Committee four times.

== World Heritage Sites ==
UNESCO lists sites under ten criteria; each entry must meet at least one of the criteria. Criteria i through vi are cultural, and vii through x are natural.

* Transnational site

World Heritage Sites
Site	Image	Location (state)	Year listed	UNESCO data	Description
Historic Town of Ouro Preto	Two-storied white buildings with red roof tiles lining a square. At the end of the square there is a prominent building with a clock tower.	Minas Gerais	1980	124; i, iii (cultural)	Ouro Preto, literally Black Gold, was the centre of the Brazilian Gold Rush in the 18th century. It was also the centre of the Inconfidência Mineira, the Brazilian independence movement in 1789. The gold deposits got exhausted in the 19th century and the city declined in importance, which helped in the preservation of its historic buildings and urban fabric. There are numerous Baroque churches, decorated by artwork by Aleijadinho, the most prominent sculptor and architect of Colonial Brazil, and ceiling paintings by Manoel da Costa Ataíde.
Historic Centre of the Town of Olinda	White stone church with red tile roof near the sea, photo from above	Pernambuco	1982	189; ii, iv (cultural)	Olinda was founded by the Portuguese in 1535 and was one of the centres of the sugarcane industry, one of the key industries of Brazil for several centuries. After being looted by the Dutch in the 17th century, it was rebuilt and most of the historic buildings today date from the 17th to 19th centuries. There are numerous Baroque churches, convents, public buildings, as well as gardens with lush tropical vegetation.
Jesuit Missions of the Guaranis: San Ignacio Mini, Santa Ana, Nuestra Señora de Loreto and Santa Maria Mayor (Argentina), Ruins of São Miguel das Missões (Brazil)*	Ruins of a stone church facade and tower	Rio Grande do Sul	1983	275bis; iv (cultural)	In the 17th and 18th centuries, the Jesuits constructed several missions to the Guaraní people. The remains of five missions are listed as this World Heritage Site. São Miguel das Missões in Brazil (pictured) was listed independently in 1983 and the four missions in Argentina were added in 1984. The missions have different layouts and are in different states of conservation, they typically include the remains of churches and convents, plantations, and foundations of indigenous dwellings. The site in Brazil, although in ruins, constitute the most intact and complete structure among this period's designated heritage properties, with remains of the church, the belfry, and some convent buildings. The general layout is still visible.
Historic Centre of Salvador de Bahia	Town square, surrounded by colourful buildings in Portuguese colonial style, including a church	Bahia	1985	309; iv, vi (cultural)	The colonial old town of the first Brazilian capital (from 1549 to 1763) and the site of the first slave market in the New World (1558), Salvador de Bahia has preserved many brightly colored Renaissance houses decorated with stucco work from the 16th to 18th centuries. A centre of the sugar industry and a major port, it was a meeting place of European, African, and American Indian cultures. Some of the prominent buildings include the Cathedral Basilica of Salvador, the Church and Convent of São Francisco, Salvador, and the Church of the Third Order of Mount Carmel.
Sanctuary of Bom Jesus de Matosinhos	Stairs leading to a white stone church with two towers. Sculptures are placed on walls in front of the church.	Minas Gerais	1985	334; i, iv (cultural)	The sanctuary complex represents the apex of Christian art in Latin America. The church, which is from the second half of the 18th century, is in the Baroque style with the interior in the Italian-inspired Rococo style. The church is approached by the path passing seven chapels with polychrome sculptures depicting the Stations of the Cross by the sculptor Aleijadinho. The outdoor stairway is decorated by soapstone sculptures of twelve prophets, also by Aleijadinho.
Iguaçu National Park	A large horseshoe shaped waterfall	Paraná	1986	355; vii, x (natural)	Iguazu Falls on the eponymous river span over 2,700 m (8,900 ft) and have a vertical drop of 80 m (260 ft). They are located on the border of Brazil and Argentina, where the area is protected as a separate World Heritage Site, the Iguazú National Park. The surrounding area comprises the Paranese subtropical rainforest, a part of the Atlantic Forest. The forest is rich in biodiversity and is home to large animals such as the tapir, giant anteater, giant otter, ocelot, jaguar, and jaguarundi. From 1999 to 2001, the site was listed as endangered due to an illegally opened road through the park, dams on the river, and helicopter flights.
Brasília	Human sculptures and a hyperbolic shaped modern building with white ribs and glass, a night scene	Federal District	1987	445; i, iv (cultural)	As a part of his modernization project, President Juscelino Kubitschek decided to move the national capital to the newly established city of Brasília. The city was designed by the architects Lúcio Costa and Oscar Niemeyer and constructed between 1956 and 1960. The city plan follows the concepts of modernist architecture, as promoted by Le Corbusier, on a large scale, and adjusted to a setting in a tropical climate. Some of the important buildings include the Cathedral of Brasília (pictured), the National Congress Palace, and the Cláudio Santoro National Theater.
Serra da Capivara National Park	Rock painting in red of a four legged animal, a smaller four legged animal and a human figure	Piauí	1991	606; iii (cultural)	The area of the national park has been inhabited for millennia and is one of the oldest archaeological sites in the Americas. There are over 300 sites with rock paintings (example pictured), some of which have been dated to be more than 25,000 years old. The age of these paintings revolutionized the classical theories of initial peopling of the Americas through Beringia. Excavations uncovered initial presence of hunter-gatherer societies and later ceramic-farmer societies.
Historic Centre of São Luís	A cobblestone street of old single-storied brightly colored houses	Maranhão	1997	821; iii, iv, v (cultural)	São Luís, originally founded as a fortress by the French in 1612, is a prime example of a Portuguese colonial town from the 17th century, with expansions in the following centuries. Due to a period of economic stagnation in the early 20th century, it has preserved the complete rectangular town plan and numerous historical buildings. Buildings in traditional Portuguese colonial architecture, adjusted to an equatorial setting, feature azulejo (ceramic tiles), crafted stoneworks, ornamented facades, and interior patios.
Historic Centre of the Town of Diamantina	Old church, cobble stone streets and two-storied houses with white facades	Minas Gerais	1999	890; ii, iv (cultural)	The 18th century town of Diamantina, located in an inhospitable and wild mountain setting, attracted prospectors when diamonds were discovered in the area. The town preserves numerous buildings in Brazilian Baroque style, which are made of wood and more modest than in other Brazilian towns. The city illustrates the adaptations of European cultural models to Brazilian interior.
Discovery Coast Atlantic Forest Reserves	View of vast forested landscape	Bahia, Espírito Santo	1999	892rev; ix, x (natural)	The site comprises eight protected areas with some of the last remaining Atlantic Forests. These forests, which were in the past connected via corridors to the Amazon basin ecosystem, show a very high animal and plant diversity with many rare and endemic species, including 21 species of marsupials, 21 species of primates, and 620 species of birds. Monte Pascoal National Park is pictured.
Atlantic Forest South-East Reserves	Forested mountains topped by rocks	Paraná, São Paulo	1999	893rev; vii, ix, x (natural)	The site comprises 25 forest reserves with some of the last remaining Atlantic Forests, one of the world's most threatened biomes. There are dense forests, mangroves, wetlands, coastal islands, Karst caves, and mountain peaks. The area is a biodiversity hotspot, with 120 mammal species and 350 bird species recorded, and with one of world's highest plant diversity. Numerous animal and plant species are endemic and several are endangered. Some of the species include the jaguar, ocelot, southern muriqui, Superagüi lion tamarin, and red-tailed amazon. Serra do Mar is pictured.
Historic Centre of the Town of Goiás		Goiás	2001	993; ii, iv (cultural)	Goiás was founded in the 18th century by the bandeirante explorers as the first Portuguese settlement west of the demarcation line defined in the Treaty of Tordesillas. It was a mining town and it is the last remaining example of a settlement in Brazilian interior as practiced in the 18th and 19th centuries. It demonstrates the adaptation of a European settlement to the climate, topography, and cultural constraints of the region. Architecture is modest, with the use of locally sourced materials and vernacular techniques. Some of the important buildings include the Governor's Palace, the cathedral, and the foundry.
Central Amazon Conservation Complex	Satellite image of a wide river and smaller meandering tributaries running through a light green landscape	Amazonas	2000	998bis; ix, x (natural)	This site comprises four protected areas in the Amazon basin. The landscape is constantly evolving due to the river action, with a mosaic of river channels, islands, and lakes. The area is one of the world's richest regions in terms of biodiversity. Ecosystems include periodically flooded várzea and igapó forests, dryland forests, swamps, and beaches. Animals that live there include the arapaima, giant otter, Amazonian manatee, black caiman, jaguar, harpy eagle, Amazon river dolphin, and tucuxi. There are also 64 species of electric fish. The Jaú National Park was listed independently in 2000. In 2003, the site was renamed to the current name and expanded to include the Mamirauá Sustainable Development Reserve, the Anavilhanas Ecological Station, and the Amana Sustainable Development Reserve.
Pantanal Conservation Area	Plain with forests, grassland, rivers and many lakes	Mato Grosso, Mato Grosso do Sul	2000	999; vii, ix, x (natural)	This site comprises four protected areas in the Pantanal, one of the world's largest freshwater wetlands. In the wet season, the rivers of the Pantanal spill and flood vast areas, whereas the waters recede in the dry season and leave numerous temporary lakes. The floods allow fish to cross between river basins and to distribute nutrients. The area is home to numerous species of aquatic plants, such as water lilies, and they provide a stark contrast to the plants of the semi-arid landscapes of the neighboring mountains. Large animals that live in the park include the jaguar, giant otter, giant anteater, marsh deer, and hyacinth macaw.
Brazilian Atlantic Islands: Fernando de Noronha and Atol das Rocas Reserves	Rocky coast interspersed by sand beaches.	Pernambuco, Rio Grande do Norte	2001	1000rev; vii, ix, x (natural)	The Fernando de Noronha archipelago (pictured) and Atol das Rocas, the only atoll in the South Atlantic, are peaks of a submarine ridge and one of the few insular habitats of the region. As such, they provide an important habitat for tropical seabirds, nesting site for hawksbill sea turtle and green turtle, as well as feeding ground for fish and marine mammals. The islands support the only example of Atlantic Forest and the only oceanic mangroves in the South Atlantic.
Cerrado Protected Areas: Chapada dos Veadeiros and Emas National Parks	Araras on a tree in a savanna	Goiás	2001	1035bis; ix, x (natural)	Chapada dos Veadeiros and Emas National Parks (pictured) represent the Cerrado, one of the oldest and most biodiverse tropical biome in the world. The region has two well-defined seasons, dry and wet. There are frequent fires and the soil is poor in nutrients. This resulted in various adaptations of animal and plant species. Due to its central location and various altitudes, the two sites have served as refugia for species during periods of climate change. Large animals in the parks include the jaguar, giant anteater, giant armadillo, maned wolf, pampas deer, and rhea. A minor boundary modification of the site took place in 2019.
São Francisco Square in the Town of São Cristóvão	White church on a square	Sergipe	2010	1272rev; ii, iv (cultural)	The square in the town of São Cristóvão is a rare example of urban planning during the time of the Iberian Union, when Spain and Portugal were united under a single crown in the 16th and 17th centuries. The buildings represent a fusion of both colonial styles. Buildings from the period include the Provincial Palace, the Church and Convent of Santa Cruz (pictured), and the Misericórdia Hospital and Church. The ensemble is surrounded by houses from the 18th and 19th centuries.
Rio de Janeiro: Carioca Landscapes Between the Mountain and the Sea	A view of Rio from above with the Christ the Redeemer	Rio de Janeiro	2012	1100rev: v, vi (cultural)	Rio de Janeiro is located in a scenery of remarkable natural beauty between the sea and mountains covered by lush forests. This setting has shaped the development of the city and inspired arts, music, and literature. The World Heritage Site comprises properties of cultural landscape within and around the city, including the Tijuca National Park, the Botanical Gardens, established in 1808, Corcovado Mountain with the Christ the Redeemer statue, Sugarloaf Mountain, and the Copacabana Bay.
Pampulha Modern Ensemble	White modernist church in front of a lake	Minas Gerais	2016	1493; i, ii, iv (cultural)	The modernist urban project around the artificial Lake Pampulha in Belo Horizonte was created in 1940 by the architect Oscar Niemeyer, in collaboration with the landscape architect Roberto Burle Marx and engineer Joaquim Cardozo. The complex comprised the Church of Saint Francis of Assisi (pictured), the Golf Yacht Club, the Casino, and the Ballroom, the latter two now being used as a museum and an architecture reference centre, respectively. The garden city project, which explored creative uses of concrete and emphasized the interaction between buildings and the natural surroundings, was influential in shaping the architecture of Latin American countries.
Valongo Wharf Archaeological Site	Ruins in different layers with modern city in the background	Rio de Janeiro	2017	1548; vi (cultural)	The wharf was built in 1811 in central Rio de Janeiro and served as the entry point for an estimated 900,000 African slaves to South America. The original Valongo Wharf was constructed on the beach with a paving of hewn stones of different shapes and sizes, in the so-called pé de moleque style. The Empress’ Wharf was constructed over it in 1843. The site was excavated in 2011 and made open to the public. The adjacent structures of the wharf, such as the warehouses, quarantine facilities, a lazaretto, and a cemetery, have either been lost or have preserved underground remains.
Paraty and Ilha Grande - Culture and Biodiversity	View of a colonial-era town with a church at the coast	Rio de Janeiro	2019	1308rev; v, x (mixed)	This site comprises the historic centre of Paraty (pictured) and four protected areas with Atlantic Forests. The ecosystems span from the sea level to the rugged peaks of Serra do Mar above 2,000 m (6,600 ft). They represent a biodiversity hotspot with 450 bird and 150 mammal species. There is a high level of endemism. The town of Paraty was the end point of the gold route from the mines in the interior and the entry point for African slaves. The town has preserved most of its urban plan and colonial architecture from the 18th and 19th centuries. The cultural landscape of the region has been shaped since prehistoric times by the local Tupi–Guarani communities that relied on fishing. Later, the communities of escaped slaves, quilombolas, created their own culture.
Sítio Roberto Burle Marx	Garden with rocks, water pond, and tropical plants	Rio de Janeiro	2021	1620; ii, iv (cultural)	The estate in Barra de Guaratiba, a suburb of Rio de Janeiro, belonged to the architect and naturalist Roberto Burle Marx (1909–1994). As a landscape designer, Burle Marx was experimenting with the use of native tropical plants in modernist architecture. The estate hosts 3,500 species of plants, representing different biomes of Brazil, including the Atlantic Forest, mangrove swamp, and restinga, tropical sandy plains. The work of Burle Marx has influenced landscape designers in numerous tropical parks and gardens around the world.
Lençóis Maranhenses National Park	Sandy dunes and water ponds	Maranhão	2024	1611; vii, viii (natural)	The park is located on the coast of the Maranhão State. It comprises a vast expanse of sandy dunes with temporary and permanent lagoons. The interplay between rain and wind keeps evolving the landscape. As the park is located at the transition zone between the Cerrado, Caatinga and Amazon biomes, it is rich in biodiversity.
Cavernas do Peruaçu National Park	Path through a canyon with Karst formations	Minas Gerais	2025	1747; vii, viii (natural)	The karst canyon has rock art and other traces of prehistoric occupation dating from the 10th millennium BCE. It is home to threatened animal and plant species. Nearby, there is the Xacriabás Indian Reserve.
Amazonia Theaters	A large theatre building with a pink facade and a tile-covered dome	Amazonas, Pará	2026	1774; ii, iv (cultural)	This site comprises two theatres constructed in the two main cities of the Amazon basin during the Belle Époque, at the end of the 19th century. They represent the prosperity brought by the Amazon rubber boom, and the desire of the local society to align with the contemporary European standards. The Amazon Theatre (pictured) in Manaus features decorations inspired by the nature of the Amazon rainforest and is topped by an iron dome, covered in multicolour glazed scales. The Teatro da Paz in Belém is a neoclassical building. The ceiling is decorated by paintings that represent figures from Greek and Roman mythology in the Amazonian setting.

== Tentative list ==
In addition to sites inscribed on the World Heritage List, member states can maintain a list of tentative sites that they may consider for nomination. Nominations for the World Heritage List are only accepted if the site was previously listed on the tentative list. Brazil maintains 18 properties on its tentative list.

Tentative sites
Site	Image	Location (state)	Year listed	UNESCO criteria	Description
Church and Monastery of São Bento, Rio de Janeiro	A church building with two bell towers	Rio de Janeiro	1996	i, ii, iv (cultural)	The Benedictine abbey dates from the early 17th century. Later additions in the 18th and 19th century were done in a consistent manner with the original architecture. The interior is decorated with wooden carvings and paintings.
Palace of Culture, former headquarters of the Ministry of Education and Health, Rio de Janeiro	A modernist high building with water tanks on the top	Rio de Janeiro	1996	i, ii, iv (cultural)	The building, originally known as the Ministry of Education and Health Building, was the first modernist project in Brazil and was important in view of the architectural development of Modernism in Brazil. It was constructed between 1937 and 1945 by the architects Lucio Costa, Oscar Niemeyer, Affonso Eduardo Reidy, Ernani Vasconcellos, Carlos Leão, and Jorge Machado Moreira, following the designs by Le Corbusier. The gardens were designed by Roberto Burle Marx while the interior decorations with murals were done by Candido Portinari.
Pico da Neblina National Park (Amazonas)	A mountain with a pointy summit rising above rainforest	Amazonas	1996	vii, ix, x (natural)	The park, located on the border with Venezuela, comprises equatorial rainforests and cloud forests on the mountain slopes. The area is rich in wildlife. The park contains Brazil's highest mountain, Pico da Neblina, at 2,995 m (9,826 ft) (pictured).
Taim Ecological Station (Rio Grande do Sul)	Marshes and a lagoon with low vegetation	Rio Grande do Sul	1996	ix, x (natural)	The area close to the border with Uruguay comprises coastal lagoons, including Lagoon Mirim, marshes, and ocean beaches with sandy dunes. It is an important habitat for birds and nutrias. The marshlands are used for grazing and cultivation, which presents a threat to the environment.
Serra do Divisor National Park	Tropical forests with a river, aerial photo	Acre	1998	vii, viii, ix, x (natural)	The park is centred on a hilly plateau that separates the river basins of the Ucayali and Jurua. The vegetation includes the flooded Igapó forests, as well as lowland and sub-mountain forests at elevated areas. The highest peaks reach up to 600 m (2,000 ft). The area is rich in biodiversity. Traditional communities that live within the park boundaries practice collecting of rubber.
Serra da Canastra National Park	Visitors looking at a waterfall	Minas Gerais	1998	vii, ix, x (natural)	The park, located in the Canastra Mountains, comprises two isolated plateaus, separated by a valley. There are numerous streams and waterfalls. The vegetation is typical of the Cerrado biome, with low shrub savanna, high forested savanna, and gallery forest. Before the establishment of the national park, parts of the park with richer soils were used for pastures and agriculture. The animals that live in the area include the maned wolf, giant anteater, and giant armadillo.
Cavernas do Peruaçu Federal Environmental Protection Area (APA) / Veredas Do Peruaçu State Park	Rocky formations and a large natural bridge	Minas Gerais	1998	iii, iv, v, vii, viii, ix, x (mixed)	The Peruaçu River, one of the few permanent rivers in the area, has carved a 20 km (12 mi) long tunnel through a calcareous massive. Parts of the ceiling later collapsed, resulting in landforms such as canyons, caves, galleries, and natural bridges. The vegetation comprises Caatinga forests and is one of the last remaining dry forest areas in central Brazil. The fauna is rich with Cerrado species. Hunter-gatherer communities were drawn to the water sources already in the 10th millennium BCE. They left abundant rock art in different styles on canyon walls.
Cultural Landscape of Paranapiacaba: Village and railway systems in the Serra do Mar Mountain Range	Railway in a tropical setting with lush vegetation	São Paulo	2014	(cultural) (i)(ii)(iv)	Paranapiacaba was established as a company town for the employees of São Paulo Railway, a privately owned British railway company. A funicular was constructed in the 1860s to transport passengers and coffee beans, produced in Jundiaí, through the Serra do Mar, to the port of Santos. It was the first railway in Brazil and accelerated the development of São Paulo. The second funicular line was constructed at the turn of the 20th century. The construction of the track crossing the mountains covered by Serra do Mar coastal forests was a challenging task due to the demanding terrain. Paranapiacaba was designed following the urban and sanitary standards of workers villages in Europe.
Ver-o-Peso	Market buildings, including a blue one with spires, at a riverfront	Pará	2014	ii, iii, iv, vi (cultural)	The Ver-o-Peso is an open-air market, located at the riverfront in the city of Belém. Its origins date back to the mid-17th century. For centuries, it has served as the gateway to the Amazon region, playing an important role in the exchange of people, arts, and agricultural products between different communities. The urban ensemble is characterized by eclectic, Europe-inspired architecture, with several Art Nouveau buildings made of pre-fabricated iron plates.
Brazilian Fortresses Ensemble	A fort on an island, close to the coast	several sites	2015	ii, iv (cultural)	This nomination comprises a series of 19 fortresses that were constructed by the Portuguese in Brazil during the period of colonial expansion and consolidation of power between the 16th and 19th centuries. They were intended to cater more to the needs of the locals than to those of the motherland. Hundreds of fortresses were built in particular to address threats from other colonial powers and from the indigenous peoples. They drew from different European influences but were less elaborate and technologically advanced than their contemporary European counterparts. Fortaleza de Santo Amaro da Barra Grande is pictured.
Cedro Dam in the Quixadá Monoliths	A dam on a river with elaborate iron railings, large stone formations in the background	Ceará	2015	iv (cultural)	The Cedro Dam was constructed at the turn of the 19th century as the first major hydraulic work in South America and the first major Brazilian government project in the Caatinga. It was constructed in order to alleviate droughts and stimulate cotton production in the arid region. The arc of the dam is 415 m (1,362 ft) long and 20 m (66 ft) high. The success of the dam providing water security resulted in similar damming projects and an increase of the population in the region. The surroundings of the dam are interesting on their own, with numerous monoliths of unusual shapes. Pedra da Galinha Choca is pictured in the background of the dam.
Geoglyphs of Acre	Large geoglyphs with geometric shapes (square, circle) on a deforested land. Aerial photograph.	Acre	2015	iii, iv, v (cultural)	The geoglyphs, large earthen excavated structures with low walls and ditches, mostly date to the 1st millennium CE. There are more than 300 archaeological sites with geoglyphs in the western Amazon, with more than 400 individual earthworks. They typically have geometric shapes such as squares and circles. According to the interpretation of the researchers, they were used for social or ritual gathering and some were residential. The size and number of geoglyphs demonstrate the high population density in the region in pre-colonian Brazil.
Itacoatiaras of Ingá River	A large rock with abstract rock carvings	Paraíba	2015	i, iii (cultural)	Ingá Stone is a large rocky outcrop in the Ingá River. It is covered by rock carvings that have been estimated to date from around 10,000 BCE to 1400 CE. As opposed to anthropomorphic and zoomorphic rock art motifs of similar age from other archaeological sites worldwide, here the carvings are mostly non-figurative. Motifs include spirals, arrows, and clusters of dots that have been interpreted by researchers to represent stars. There are several other sites with rock art in the area.
Sociobiodiverse Cultural Basin of the Chapada do Araripe	Hills covered with lush vegetation and some tree-less brown patches	Ceará, Pernambuco, Piauí	2024	iii, vi, viii (mixed)	The Chapada do Araripe is a large chapada, a plateau, which is significant both for natural and cultural properties. It has some of Brazil's best palaeontological sites, the Santana Group, with the Crato, Ipubi and Romualdo Formations from the Early Cretaceous. It is also the only region where the bird Araripe manakin lives. The area is also home to the native Kiriri people, whose cultural traditions and spiritual practices are interwoven with the natural environment.
Oswaldo Cruz Foundation: health, science and culture in Manguinhos	A building in Moorish revival style	Rio de Janeiro	2024	ii, vi (cultural)	Fundação Oswaldo Cruz, also known as FIOCRUZ, was founded in 1900 by the physician and epidemiologist Oswaldo Cruz. It is located in Manguinhos, which was at that time far from the urban centre but is today surrounded by favelas. The original mission of the foundation was to manufacture serums and vaccines against the bubonic plague. Today, the foundation is one of the largest public health institutions in the world, with facilities country-wide. The campus in Manguinhos comprises buildings from different periods and architectural styles. The Moorish Pavilion (pictured) in Moorish Revival dates from the beginning of the 20th century while newer buildings were added in the 1940s and 50s.
Protected Areas of the Caatinga Dry Tropical Forest	Rock formations and trees	Alagoas, Bahia, Ceará, Pernambuco, Piauí, Rio Grande do Norte, Sergipe	2025	vii, viii, ix, x (natural)	This nomination covers a large number of protected areas of the Caatinga biome, which is unique to Brazil, including the Serra das Confusões, Serra da Capivara, Chapada Diamantina, Boqueirão da Onça, Furna Feia, Ubajara, Serra do Teixeira, Catimbau, and Sete Cidades national parks.
Golden Lion Tamarin Protected Areas	An orange monkey sitting on a branch	Rio de Janeiro	2025	x (natural)	The golden lion tamarin was in danger of extinction in the 1970s, but its population has risen due to coordinated conservation efforts. This nomination includes five areas that protect this monkey's habitat.
Abrolhos Marine National Park	A coral reef	Bahia	2025	vii, ix, x (natural)	This national park features distinctive column-shaped coral reefs called chapeirões, as well as volcanic formations and a highly diverse marine ecosystem. It is important for the study of reef ecosystem evolution and differs from most similar areas in being strongly influenced by siliciclastic sediments and lacking a back-reef lagoon. Abrolhos Marine National Park harbors over three hundred fish species and serves as a major breeding area for humpback whales and a nesting site for threatened sea turtle species.

== See also ==
- List of Intangible Cultural Heritage elements in Brazil
