= Sobrado at Rua das Flores =

- Sobrado à Rua das Flores
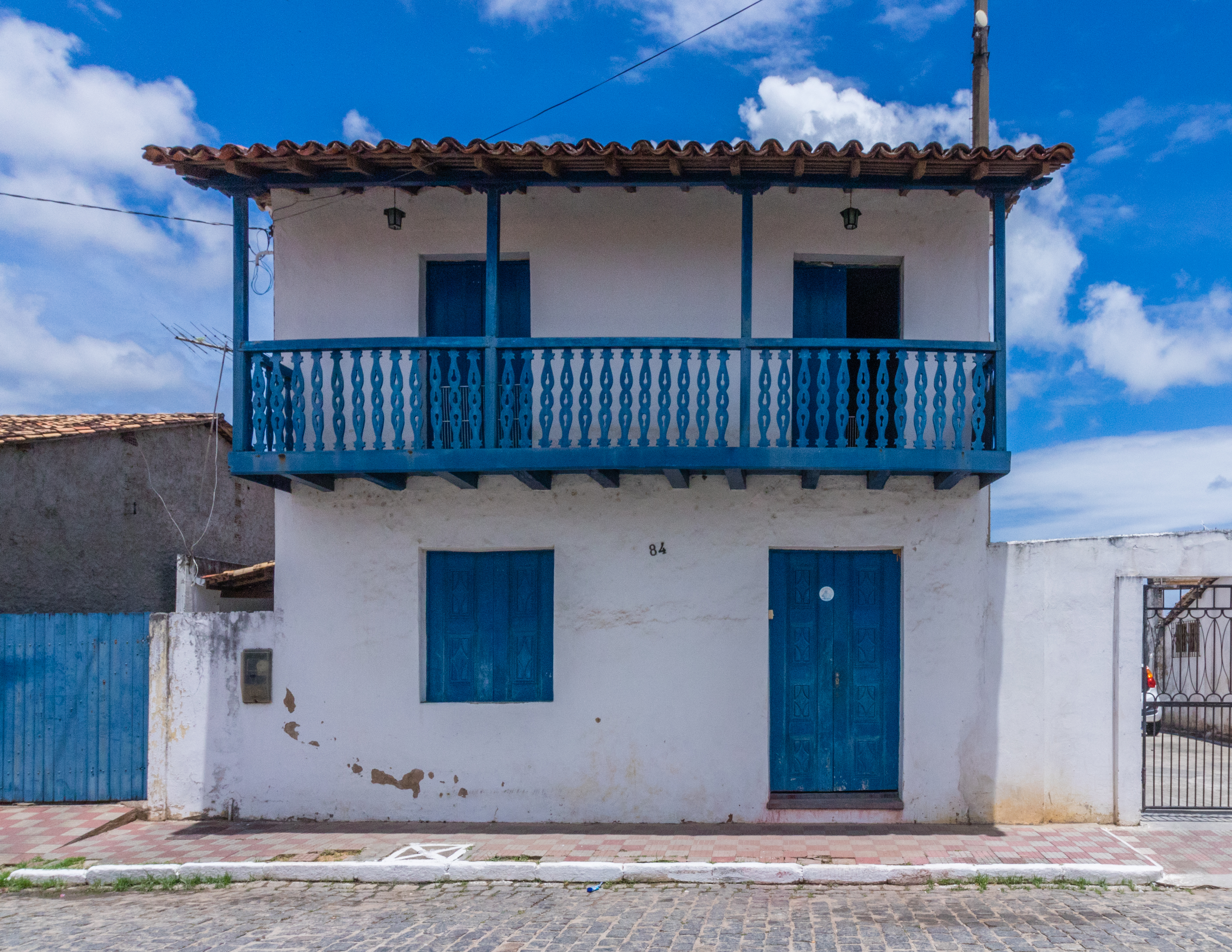
- Sobrado at Rua das Flores, São Cristóvão, Brazil

- Location within Brazil

General information
- Type: sobrado
- Location: Rua Messias Prado, 84, São Cristóvão, Sergipe, Brazil, 49100, São Cristóvão, Sergipe, Brazil
- Coordinates: 11.0158°S 37.206°W

Technical details
- Material: masonry, wood
- Floor count: 2

National Historic Heritage of Brazil
- Designated: 1943
- Reference no.: 245

The Sobrado at Rua das Flores (Portuguese: Sobrado à Rua das Flores) is a 17th-century Portuguese-colonial era sobrado, or urban manor house, in São Cristóvão, Sergipe, Brazil. It was listed as a historic structure by the National Institute of Historic and Artistic Heritage (IPHAN) in 1943. It is located within the perimeter of the UNESCO World Heritage Site of São Francisco Square (Portuguese: Praça São Francisco). The historian Maria Elisa Carrazzoni includes it among "the most dignified and representative of the residential house in [colonial] Brazil."

== History ==
The Sobrado Rua das Flores was built in the late 17th or early 18th century, and dates to the rebuilding of São Cristóvão after its destruction during the Dutch occupation of the city. It is one of numerous sobrados of the Portuguese colonial period in São Cristóvão, and is located on Rua Messias Prado, a street which runs at the south perimeter of the cidade alta, or upper city, of São Cristóvão. The sobrado is located roughly halfway between the Carmelite Complex of São Cristóvão (the First Order Church and Convent of Mount Carmel and the Church of the Third Order of Mount Carmel) and the Church of Our Lady of Protection.

== Structure ==
The Sobrado Rua das Flores was built of mixed masonry, has two stories, and a tile roof. The lower part has a rectangular door and window, and the upper floor has two small doors that open to a carved wooden balcony and support columns for the roof. The right side of the structure has four rectangular windows.

== Protected status ==
The church was listed as a historic structure by the National Institute of Historic and Artistic Heritage in 1943. It was included in the perimeter of the UNESCO World Heritage Site of São Francisco Square in 2010.

== Access ==
The Sobrado at Rua das Flores is a private residence and may not be visited.

== Footnote ==
The sobrado is known by numerous names due to the change of street names and numbers: Sobrado à Rua das Flores, Sobrado à Rua Coronel Siqueira, nº 84, Sobrado à Rua Messias Prado, nº 84, Sobrado à Rua Benjamin Constant. The name of the sobrado was translated as "Two-Storey Building At 20, Messias Do Prado St.--Japonês Restaurant" in the IPHAN UNESCO World Heritage Site application of 2010.

== See also ==
- Sobrado at Rua Castro Alves, 2
- Sobrado at Rua da Matriz
- First Order Church and Convent of Mount Carmel
- Church of the Third Order of Mount Carmel
