= Church of Our Lady of the Rosary of Black Men (São Cristóvão) =

Roman Catholic church in Sergipe, Brazil

- Igreja de Nossa Senhora do Rosário dos Homens Pretos
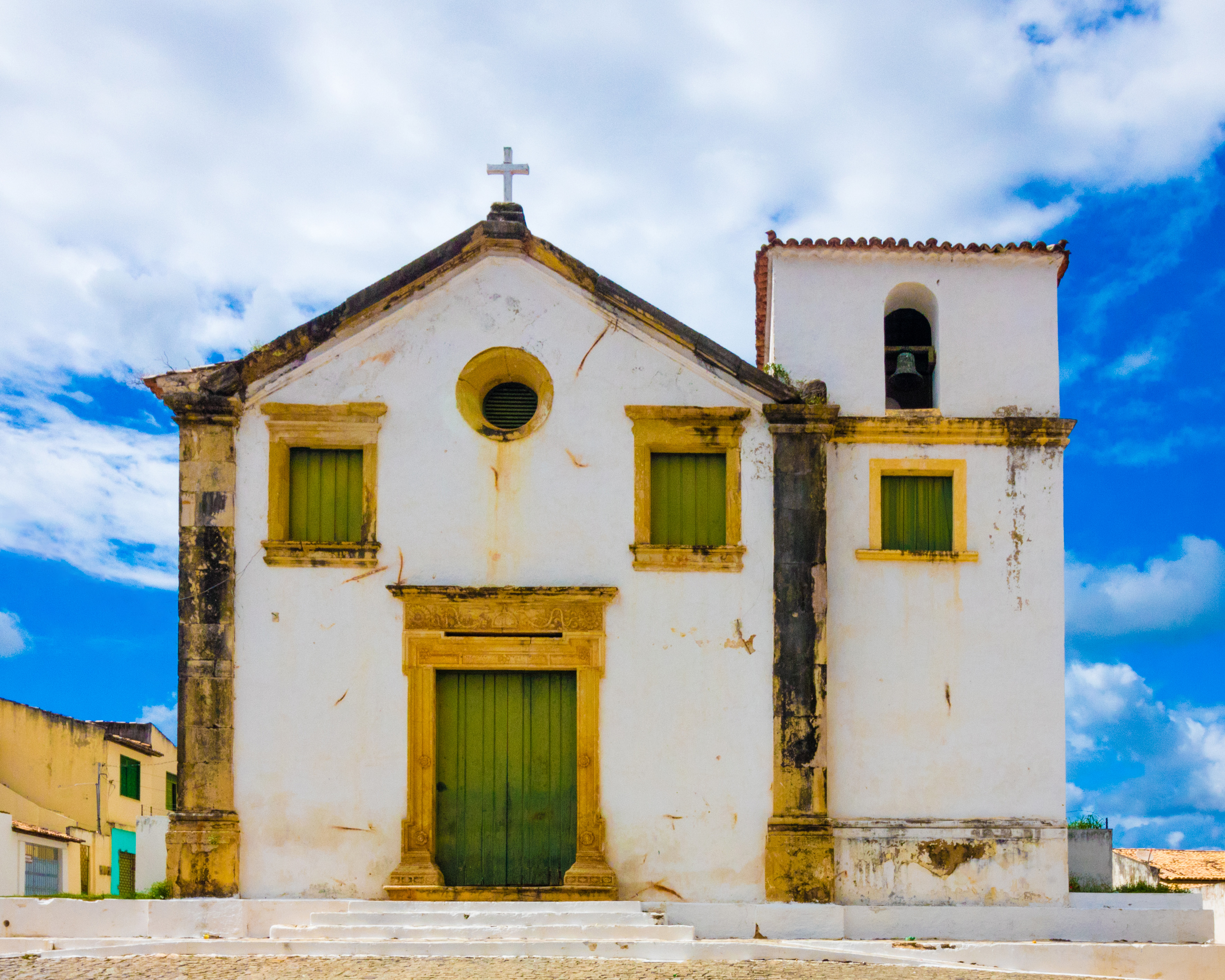
- Façade of Church of Our Lady of the Rosary of Black Men

- Location of the Church of Our Lady of the Rosary of Black Men in Brazil

Religion
- Affiliation: Catholic
- Rite: Roman Rite
- Year consecrated: 1743
- Status: Active

Location
- Municipality: São Cristóvão
- State: Sergipe
- Country: Brazil
- Interactive map of Church of Our Lady of the Rosary of Black Men
- Coordinates: 11°00′50.9″S 37°12′13.5″W

Architecture
- Style: Baroque
- Direction of façade: North

National Historic Heritage of Brazil
- Designated: 1943
- Reference no.: 293

The Church of Our Lady of the Rosary of Black Men (Portuguese: Igreja de Nossa Senhora do Rosário dos Homens Pretos) is an 18th-century Roman Catholic church located in São Cristóvão, Sergipe, Brazil. The church is located on Rua Cel. Erondino Prado 187. It is one of numerous churches across Brazil constructed by the Afro-Brazilian brotherhoods associated with Our Lady of the Rosary (Nossa Senhora do Rosário). The Church of Our Lady of the Rosary was listed as a historic structure by National Institute of Historic and Artistic Heritage (IPHAN) in 1943. It is located near, but not within the zone of São Francisco Square UNESCO World Heritage Site.

== History ==
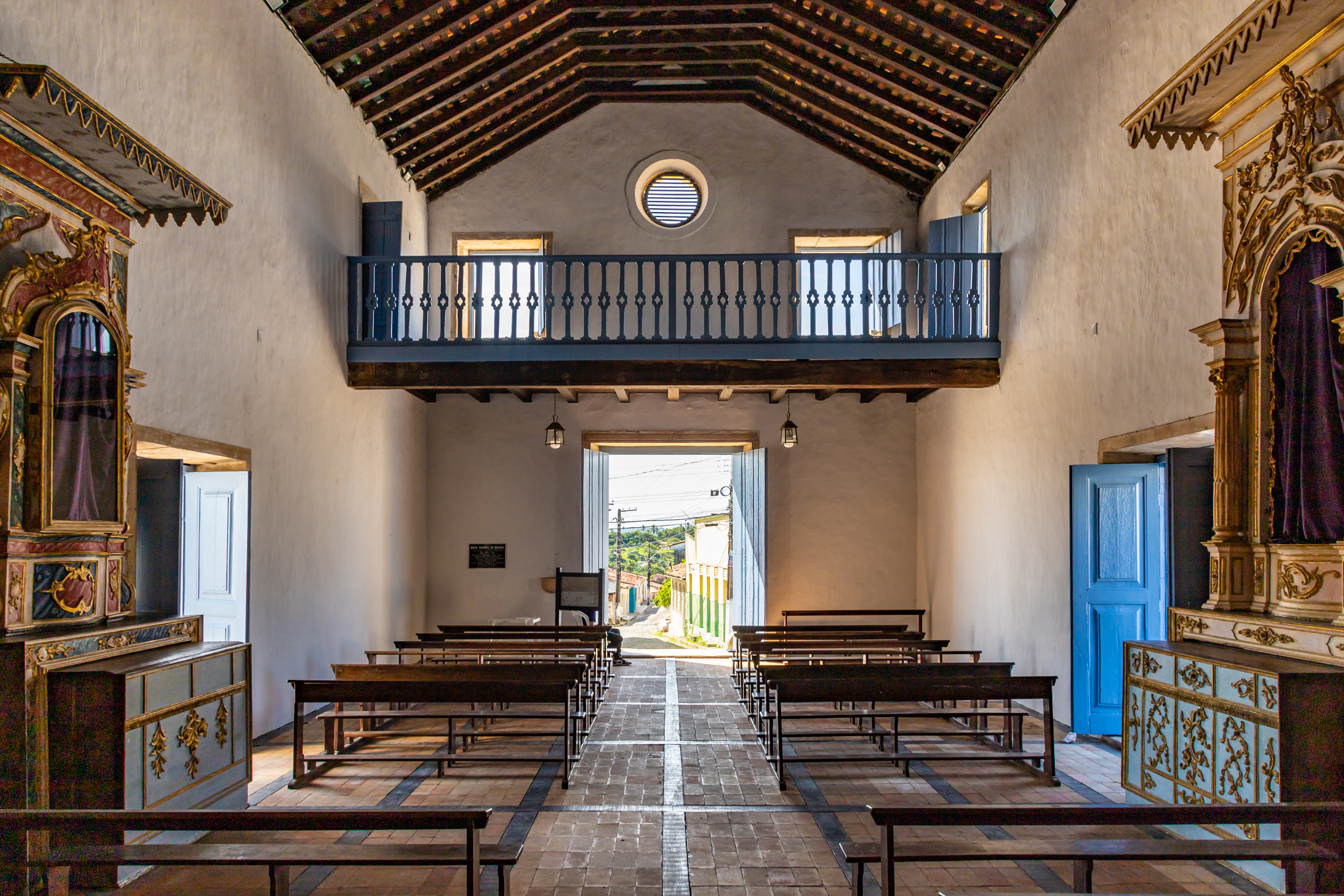
Interior, Church of Our Lady of the Rosary

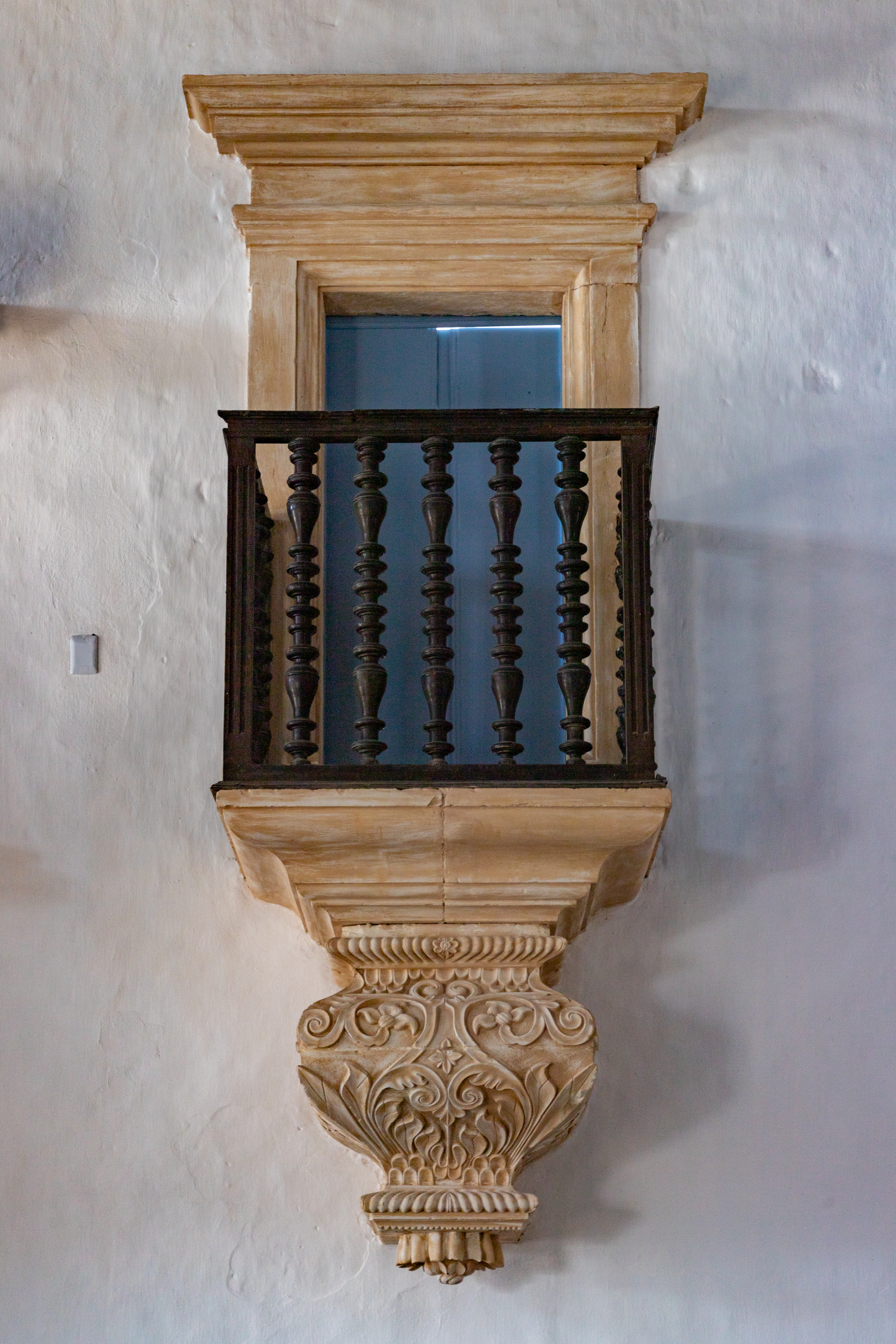
Pulpit, Church of Our Lady of the Rosary

The Church of Our Lady of the Rosary of Black Men was constructed in 1746. Religious brotherhoods formed across Brazil across the population in the 18th century, and likewise formed among African slaves who converted to Catholicism. Worship at Parish Church of Our Lady of Victory was restricted to residents of Portuguese descent, and the Church of Our Lady of Protection to mixed-race residents.

Our Lady of the Rosary (Nossa Senhora do Rosário) was of importance to slaves and later freed Afro-Brazilians; brotherhoods and churches can be found in many Brazilian cities. Catholicism in the societies and churches took on Afro-Brazilian characteristics different than those of churches of the non-black population. Churches belonging to the Brotherhoods of Black Men remain in numerous Brazilian cities. The construction of the church dates to the beginning of the sugar cane industry in the Captaincy of Sergipe, a period in which a large number of slaves were brought to the region to support sugar cane plantations.

== Structure ==
The Church of Our Lady of the Rosary of Black Men is built in the early Brazilian colonial style. The French art historian Germain Bazin classified the church in the Rococo and Neoclassical style of Bahia, produced in a "crude" manner in Sergipe. The church has a frontispiece flanked by two cornerstones and a triangular pediment, all in stone masonry. It has a large single door, two choir windows, and an oculus, or ocular window. The entire building is painted white, other than the doors and windows, which are in wood. A low tower sits to the right of the church; it has a hipped roof of ceramic tiles. The church faces Rua Cel. Erondino Prado (formerly called Rosário) and has a small paved churchyard that extends from the door to the street.

=== Interior ===
The interior of the church consists of a single nave, a chapel, and a sacristy. The nave has a high altar and two side altars. The pulpit sits on a console of carved limestone. The altars are in the Rococo style and painted white, blue, gold, and red; they resembles those of Church of Our Lady of Chains (Nossa Senhora do Corrente à Penedo) in Alagoas. A small chapel dedicated to Saint Benedict is located to the side and accessed via an arcade. A washbasin in the sacristy is inscribed "1743".

== Footnote ==
The name of the church was translated as "Church of Our Lady of the Rosary of Black" in the IPHAN UNESCO World Heritage Site application of 2010.

== See also ==
- Parish Church of Our Lady of Victory
- Church of Our Lady of Protection
- First Order Church and Convent of Mount Carmel
- Church of the Third Order of Mount Carmel
- Church and Convent of Santa Cruz
- Misericórdia Hospital and Church
