= Church of Our Lady of Nazareth of Engenho Itaperoá =

Roman Catholic church in Sergipe, Brazil

- Igreja de Nossa Senhora de Nazaré do Antigo Engenho Itaperoá
- Location of the Church of Our Lady of Nazareth of Engenho Itaperoá in Brazil

Religion
- Affiliation: Catholic
- Rite: Roman

Location
- Municipality: São Cristóvão
- State: Sergipe
- Country: Brazil
- Interactive map of Church of Our Lady of Nazareth of Engenho Itaperoá
- Coordinates: 10.985095°S 37.284396°W

Architecture
- Type: Baroque
- Direction of façade: East

The Church of Our Lady of Nazareth of Engenho Itaperoá (Portuguese: Igreja de Nossa Senhora de Nazaré do Antigo Engenho Itaperoá) is an abandoned 18th-century Roman Catholic church in São Cristóvão, Sergipe, Brazil. It is also referred to as the Chapel of Our Lady of Nazareth of Engenho Itaperoá (Portuguese: Capela de Nossa Senhora de Nazaré do Antigo Engenho Itaperoá). The church is located on the former Fazenda Itaperoá, a sugarcane plantation, west of the city center São Cristóvão. The church belonged to the Parish of Our Lady of Victory (Freguesia de Nossa Senhora da Victória), which included Santo Antônio and São Gonçalo, in Camassari. It was listed as a historic structure by the State of Sergipe in 1984; however, despite its heritage designation, the church is in advanced state of ruin.

== Structure ==
The church has a large nave, chancel, side galleries, and porches. The chancel and sacristy had independent, lower roofs than that of the nave. It has an elaborate baroque-style pediment with volutes; it likely had an image in the tympanum, but the pediment is in a state of advanced ruin. The church has three portals at the ground level and three windows at the choir level. The facade is flanked by two large bell towers corresponding to the two interior side corridors. Each tower has a small door corresponding to the central doors of the church at the lower level and a window above corresponding to those of the choir level. Each tower is topped by a dome surmounted by a pyramid-shaped pinnacle. The corridors have three windows at the upper level and two small portals below.

The church was likely connected to other buildings on the plantation, an architectural feature found on numerous sugarcane plantations of the period in Sergipe and Bahia. In both design and scale, it resembles the Chapel of the Nossa Senhora da Penha Sugar Plantation in nearby Riachuelo and the Church of Tejupeba House and the Chapel of the Colégio Sugar Plantation in Itaporanga D'Ajuda.

== Protected status ==
The Igreja de Nossa Senhora de Nazaré was listed as a historic structure by the State of Sergipe on January 6, 1984 under Decree No. 6.128 of 1984. It is one of two protected rural chapel structures in São Cristóvão, the other being the Chapel of Our Lady of the Conception of Engenho Poxim.

== Access ==
The Church of Our Lady of Nazareth of Engenho Itaperoá is located on a private property, but visible from a rural road that connects BA-101, the highway that crosses much of the east coast of Brazil, to the city of São Cristóvão.
