= Church of Our Lady of Protection (São Cristóvão) =

Roman Catholic church in Sergipe, Brazil

- Igreja de Nossa Senhora do Amparo
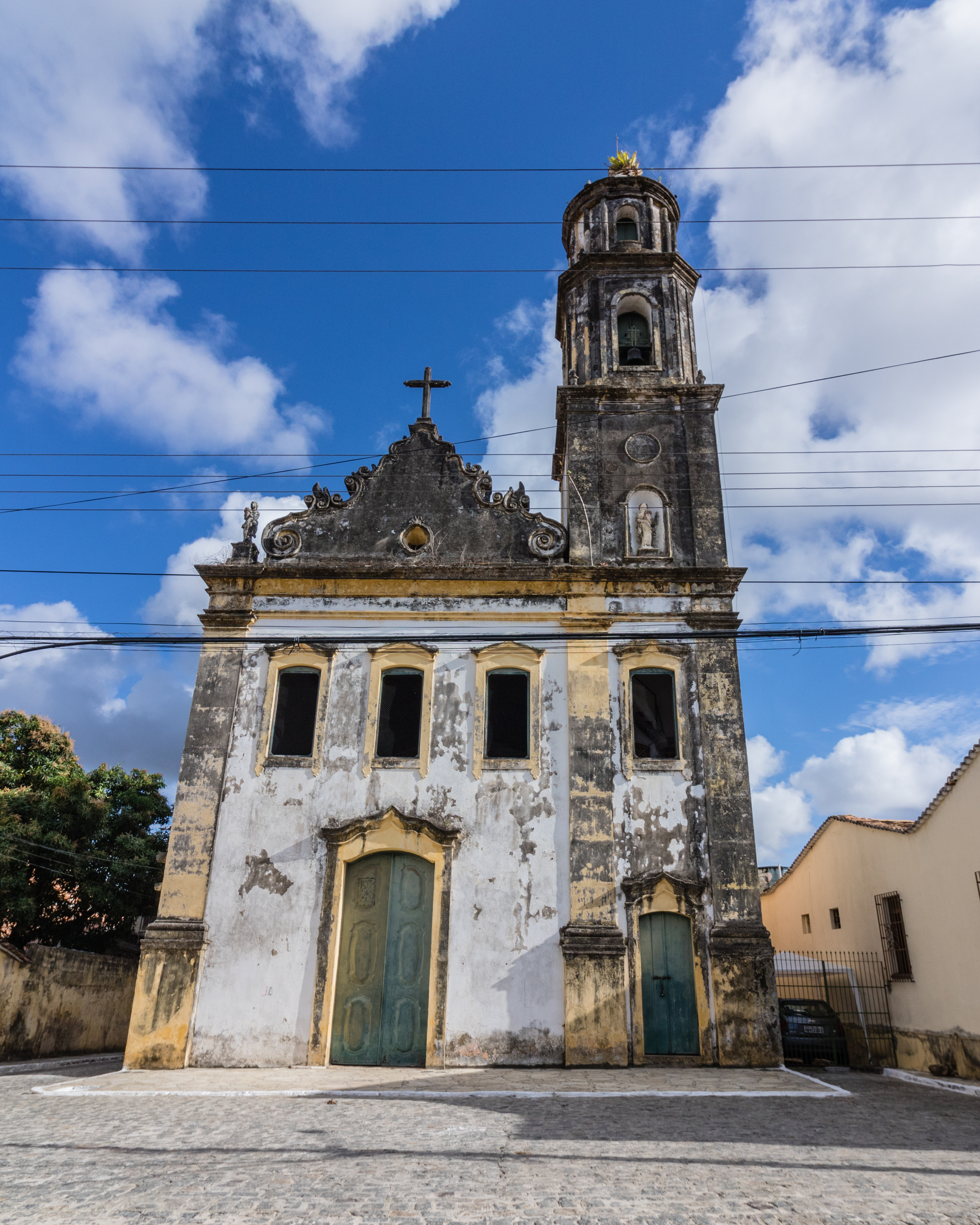
- Façade of the Church of Our Lady of Protection

- Location of the Church of Our Lady of Protection in Brazil

Religion
- Affiliation: Catholic
- Rite: Roman Rite
- Patron: Our Lady of Protection

Location
- Municipality: São Cristóvão
- State: Sergipe
- Country: Brazil
- Interactive map of Church of Our Lady of Protection
- Coordinates: 11.015312°S 37.205695°W

Architecture
- Style: Baroque
- Direction of façade: South

National Historic Heritage of Brazil
- Designated: 1962
- Reference no.: 675

The Church of Our Lady of Protection (Portuguese: Igreja de Nossa Senhora do Amparo) is an 18th-century Roman Catholic church in São Cristóvão, Sergipe, Brazil. It is located the cidade alta, or upper city, of the town in close proximity to the Carmelite complex of the First Order Church and Convent of Mount Carmel and the Third Order of Mount Carmel. The church is dedicated to Our Lady of Protection and is the property of the Archdiocese of Aracaju. In the rigidly socially stratified society of colonial Brazil the churches of Our Lady of Protection were built by and for people of mixed race. The church is part of the UNESCO World Heritage Site of São Francisco Square; it was separately listed as a historic structure by the National Institute of Historic and Artistic Heritage (IPHAN) in 1962.

== Location ==
The Church of Our Lady of Protection is located on the southernmost street of the cidade alta, or upper city, of São Cristóvão on Rua Messias Prado. The church sits on Rua Messias Prado roughly halfway between the Carmelite complex and Rua Eng. Boto de Barros. The street has numerous 17th and 18th century residences, including the Sobrado at Rua das Flores. A narrow alley runs along the left (west) side of the church and faces Rua Mamede F. Dantas at rear. The church opens to a shallow, small paved churchyard.

== History ==
The exact date of construction of the church is unclear, but likely dates to the late 18th century. It was built by the Brotherhood of Our Lady of Protection (Irmandade de Nossa Senhora do Amparo). In the stratified society of colonial Brazil, the white Portuguese population worshipped at the parish church; in São Cristóvão, the Parish Church of Our Lady of Victory, built in 1608 prior to the Dutch rule in São Cristóvão from 1637 to 1645. The Brotherhood of Our Lady of Protection built its church to serve people of mixed race; the nearby Church of Our Lady of the Rosary was completed in 1745 by and for the freed and enslaved Afro-Brazilian population of São Cristóvão. Its location is also indicative of the racial social strata of São Cristóvão: churches and convents of the Portuguese were located on the two principal plazas of the town, while the Church of Our Lady of Protection is located beyond the squares, and the Church of Our Lady of the Rosary on the periphery.

Varied construction elements of the church indicate that it was built over a long period of time, and its simplicity indicates it was likely never completed.

== Structure ==
The Church of Our Lady of Protection was built on a regular, rectangular plan with a single bell tower at right. The walls are of mixed masonry, and utilize ceramic bricks and natural limestone from the region. The façade is simple, with a single portal with three windows at the choir level. The doors and windows are simply framed in mortar. The pediment is simple, with baroque-style volutes and a single oculus at center; it is surmounted by a simple Latin cross. A single, small statue sits to the left of the pediment.

=== Bell tower ===
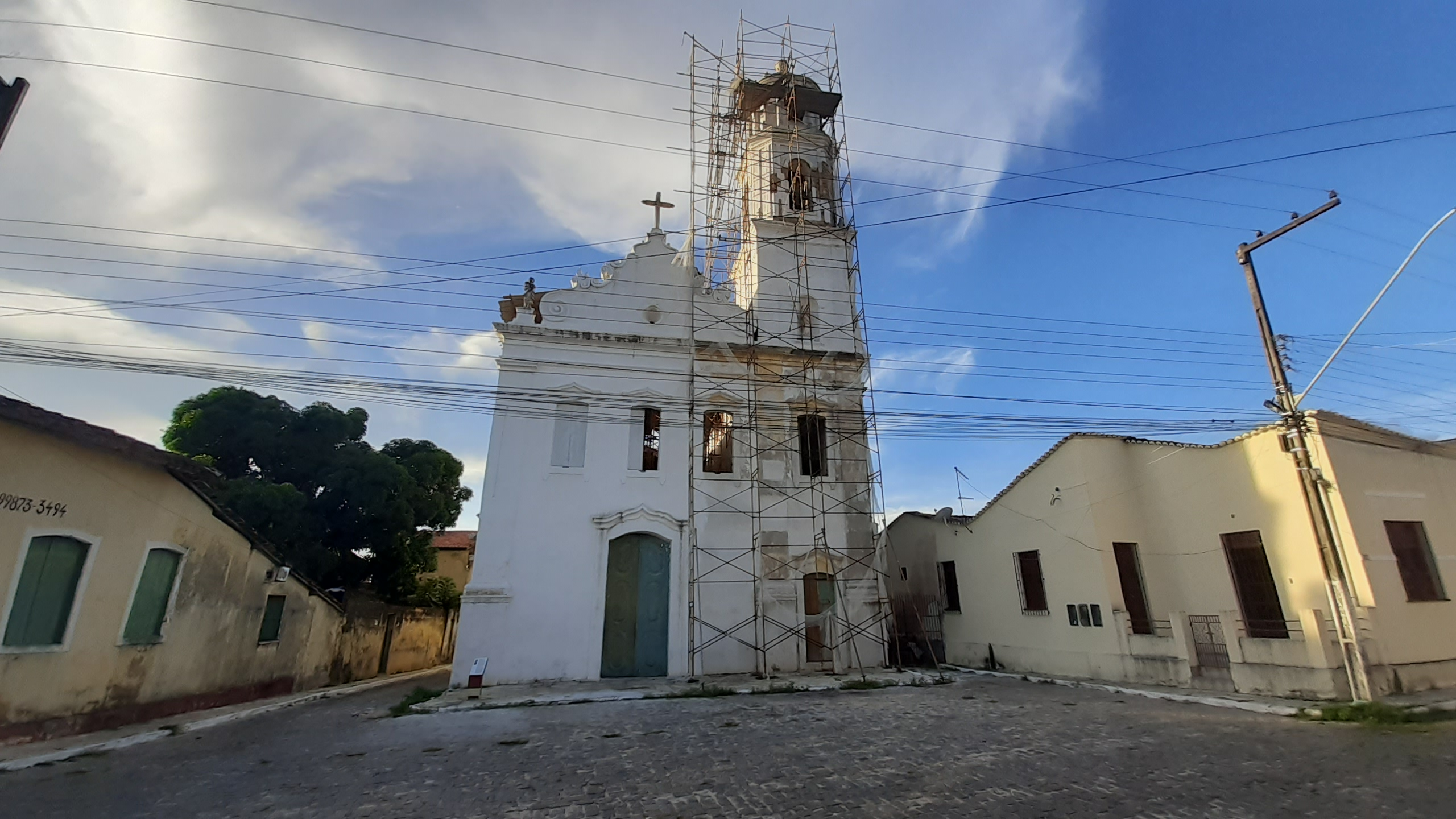
The church undergoing refurbishment in April 2024

The bell tower dates to a later period, likely to the 19th century. It was possibly modelled on the bell towers of the Co-Cathedral of Recife, better known as the Church of São Pedro dos Clérigos in Recife, Pernambuco. The bell tower has a small door in a similar style as the central portal and a window corresponding to those of the choir level. The upper part of the tower dates to a later period; it has three levels: a square at base, an octagon at center that serves as a belfry with a circular level above. The square level has a small niche with an image of the Virgin Mary.

=== Interior ===
The interior of the church has a single nave and chancel; the sacristy is located to the right of the chancel. The church has a single side aisle at right; doors and tribunes at left indicate another aisle was planned but not completed. The interior elements of the church are simple. It has a pulpit and altar rail in wood. The two side altars and high altar are in a neoclassical style and "crudely designed and executed."

== Protected status ==
The church was listed as a historic structure by the National Institute of Historic and Artistic Heritage in 1962. It was included in the perimeter of the UNESCO World Heritage Site of São Francisco Square in 2010.

== Access ==
The Church of Our Lady of Protection is not open to the public and may not be visited.

== See also ==
- Church and Convent of Santa Cruz
- Church of Our Lady of the Rosary of Black Men
- Church of the Third Order of Mount Carmel
- Parish Church of Our Lady of Victory
- Misericórdia Hospital and Church
