= Poxim River =

Coordinates: 10°24′S 36°34′W

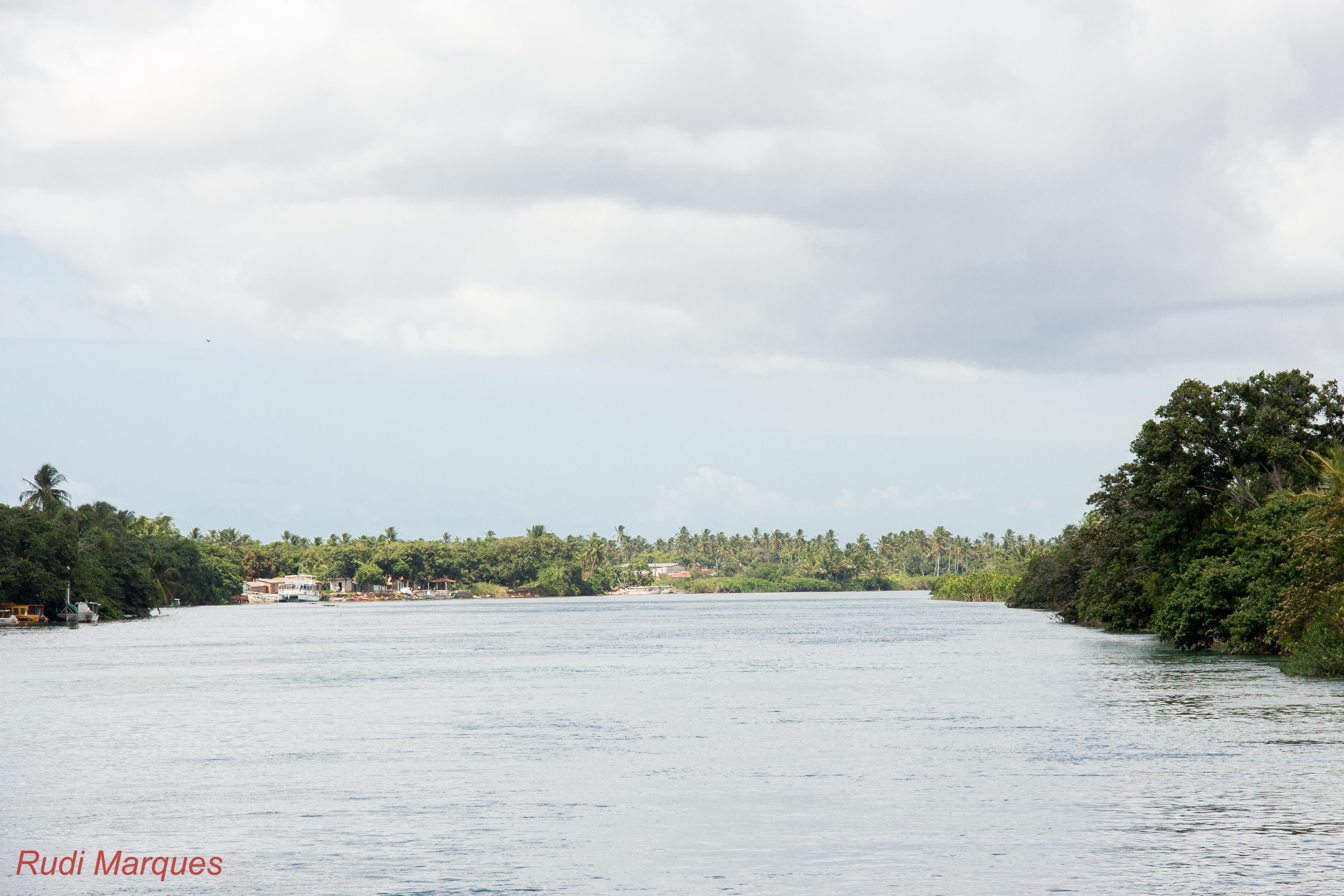
- Native name: Rio Poxim (Portuguese)

Location
- Country: Brazil
- State: Sergipe

The Poxim River (Portuguese: Rio Poxim) is a river of Sergipe state in northeastern Brazil. The river runs through the sertão region of Sergipe. Its upper reaches are occupied by sugarcane farms (50%) and pastures (35%) and its mouth by an industrial zone. Almost all vegetation in the basin of the river and its tributaries has been removed, resulting in little diversity of flora and fauna in the region.

In the colonial period sugarcane plantations, notably the Engenho Poxim, were located along the river and it was used for both irrigation and transportation. Numerous ruins related to sugarcane plantations are located near the river. The Chapel of Our Lady of the Conception of Engenho Poxim, now deserted, is a national heritage site located along a tributary of the river.

== See also ==
- List of rivers of Sergipe
