= Sobrado at Rua Castro Alves, 2 =

Portuguese Colonial architecture in Brazil

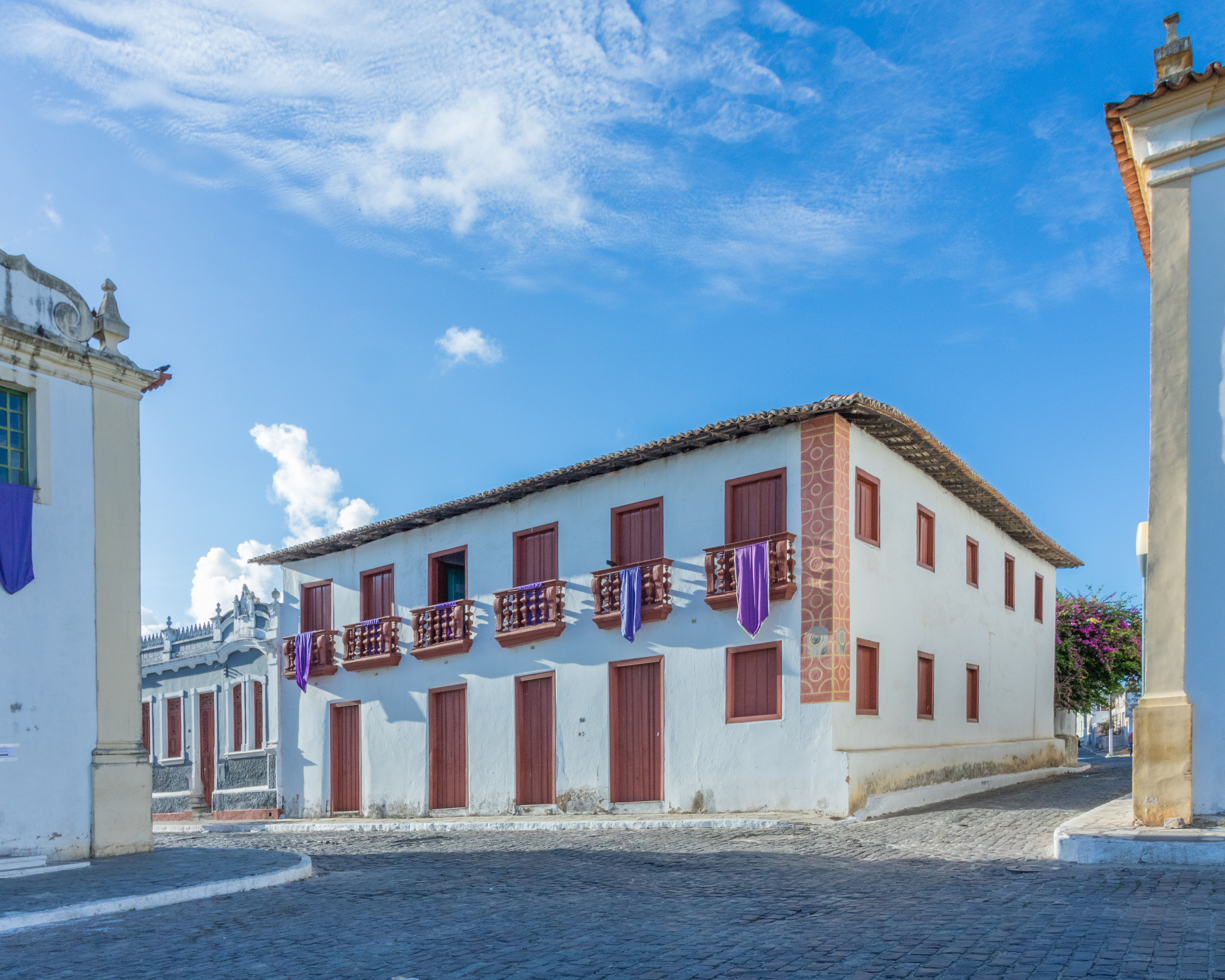
- Sobrado at Rua Castro Alves, 2

- Location within Brazil
- Alternative names: Office of National Institute of Historic and Artistic Heritage in São Cristóvão

General information
- Type: sobrado
- Location: UNESCO World Heritage Site of São Francisco Square, São Cristóvão, Rua Cel. Erondino Prado, 50, Centro, São Cristóvão, Sergipe, 49100-000, São Cristóvão, Sergipe, Brazil
- Coordinates: 11.01425°S 37.205222°W
- Current tenants: National Institute of Historic and Artistic Heritage
- Completed: 18th century

Technical details
- Floor count: 2
- Floor area: 303.24 square metres (3,264.0 ft^{2})
- Grounds: 402.56 square metres (4,333.1 ft^{2})

National Historic Heritage of Brazil
- Designated: 1943
- Reference no.: 306

The Sobrado at Rua Castro Alves, 2 (Portuguese: Sobrado à Rua Castro Alves, Nº 2) is a Portuguese-colonial era sobrado, or urban manor house, in São Cristóvão, Sergipe, Brazil. It is one of two large two-storey sobrados in São Cristóvão, the other being Sobrado at Rua da Matriz. The sobrado has two stories and covers 303.24 square metres (3,264.0 ft^{2}). It was listed as a historic structure by the National Institute of Historic and Artistic Heritage (IPHAN) in 1943, and became part of the UNESCO World Heritage Site of São Francisco Square (Portuguese: Praça São Francisco) in 2010. The sobrado now houses the São Cristóvão office of IPHAN.

== Location ==
The Sobrado at Rua Castro Alves, 2 is located in the upper city (cidade alta) of São Cristóvão on São Francisco Square (Portuguese: Praça São Francisco) in close proximity to numerous other heritage sites. The sobrado sits on the southwest corner of the square facing the Misericórdia Hospital and Church, separated by Rua Cel. Erondino Prado. The Provincial Palace of Sergipe, now the State Historic Museum of Sergipe, sits directly west, separated only by the narrow Rua Leão Magno.

== History ==
The construction of the Sobrado at Rua Castro Alves, 2 dates to the end of the 18th century. It was built by Lieutenant Colonel Francisco Xavier de Oliveira Sobral, and passed on in a donation letter to Father José Valentim de Oliveira Sobral in 1810. The property remained the property of the priest until his death, as stated in the inventory of Lieutenant Colonel Luís Francisco Freire, the Baron of Laranjeiras, who acquired it from his heirs. It was then owned by Anna Francisca Freire, Manuel Santos Lima, Anna Bonfim Pires and finally Maria Antonieta Costa Santos who, in 2003, sold the sobrado to the National Institute of Historic and Artistic Heritage. It now hosts exhibitions and workshops related to cultural heritage.

In 2006, a historical survey and archaeological intervention carried out on the occasion of the building's restoration work clarified the question about the occupation of the townhouse, without confirming, however, the occupation of the property by the Ombudsman or Provincial Assembly.

== Structure ==
The sobrado is located at one of the corners of São Francisco square in close alignment with Rua Cel. Erondino Prado. It has two floors with a small yard at rear. The sobrado covers 303.24 square metres (3,264.0 ft^{2}) on a 402.56 square metres (4,333.1 ft^{2}) site. Its walls are of rammed earth, brick masonry, stone masonry; wooden pillars that support sections of the first floor. The four doors (one now altered into a window) on the ground floor correspond roughly to six windows on the upper floor; each window has a distinctive wood balcony. Little remains of the interior elements of the building, other than a few paintings discovered during renovations.
