= Santa Casa da Misericórdia of São Cristóvão =

17th-century church and orphanage in Sergipe, Brazil

Misericórdia Hospital and Church
- Igreja e Santa Casa da Misericórdia
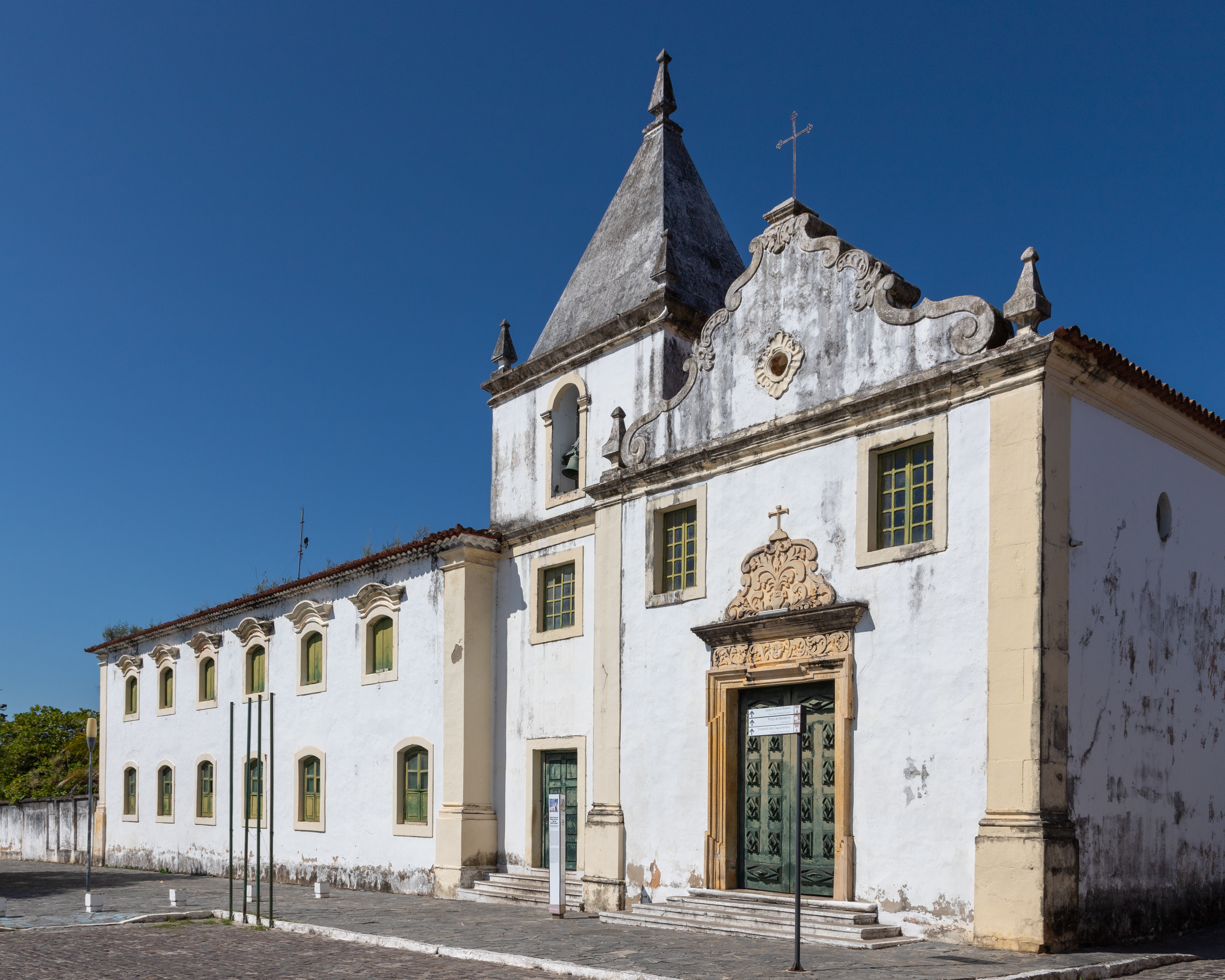
- Misericórdia Hospital and Church viewed from São Francisco Square

- Location of the Misericórdia Hospital and Church in Brazil

Religion
- Affiliation: Catholic
- Rite: Roman Rite
- Year consecrated: early 17th century
- Status: Active

Location
- Municipality: São Cristóvão
- State: Sergipe
- Country: Brazil
- Interactive map of Misericórdia Hospital and Church
- Coordinates: 11°00′50″S 37°12′18.4″W

Architecture
- Style: Baroque

Specifications
- Direction of façade: West
- Interior area: 1,739.5 square metres (18,724 ft^{2})
- Site area: 3,976 square metres (42,800 ft^{2})

The Misericórdia Hospital and Church (Portuguese: Igreja e Santa Casa da Misericórdia) is a 17th-century Roman Catholic church and orphanage located in São Cristóvão, Sergipe, Brazil. It is built in the Baroque style and occupies 1,739.5 square metres (18,724 ft^{2}) on a site of 3,976 square metres (42,800 ft^{2}) at the east of São Francisco Square. The facility was listed as a historic structure by National Institute of Historic and Artistic Heritage (IPHAN) in 1944. The facility is part of the UNESCO World Heritage Site of São Francisco Square in the Town of São Cristóvão.

== Location ==
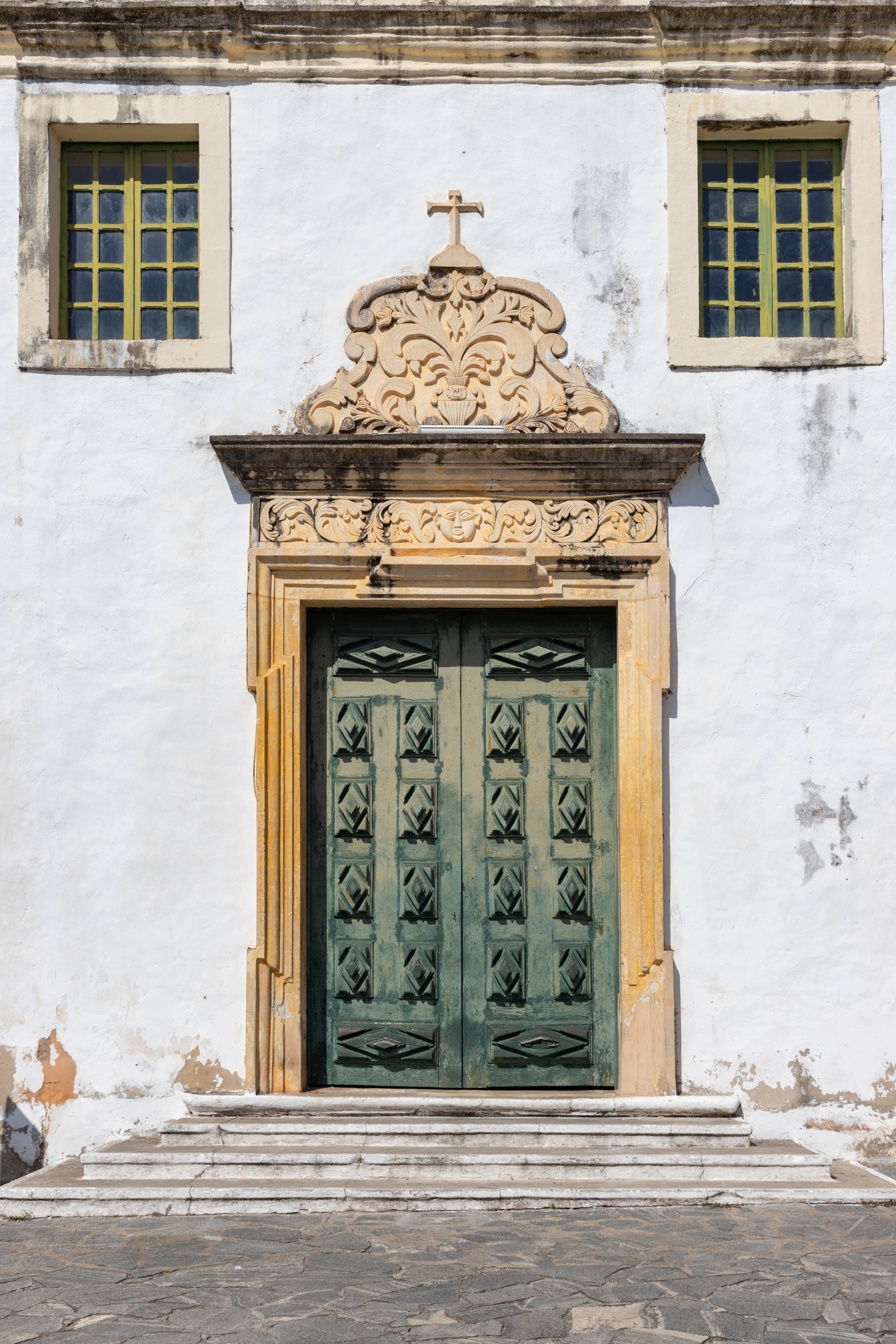
Portal, Misericórdia Hospital and Church

The Misericórdia Hospital and Church is located in the upper city (cidade alta) of São Cristóvão on São Francisco Square (Portuguese: Praça São Francisco) in close proximity to numerous other heritage sites. It sits on a large site on the east perimeter of the square, with the façade in close alignment to the square and green spaces at rear. It is separated from the Sobrado at Rua Castro Alves, 2, now the headquarters of IPHAN in São Cristóvão, separated by Rua Cel. Erondino Prado.

== History ==
The date of construction of the facility is unknown, but consisted of at least a small church by 1627. The will of Baltasar Barbunda, made on March 10, 1627, ordered that the institution would receive 20 cruzados upon his death and that "I order my body to be buried at Santa Casa de Misericórdia Church in this city of São Cristóvão." A hospital, known as Hospital da Misericórdia, was in operation at the time of Dom Pedro II's visit to the region in 1860. It operated on a government grant from the beginning of the 19th century, but lost it in 1870 due to a lack of a "doctor or apothecary". The hospital closed soon after. The Irmãs Missionárias da Irmandade Conceição Mãe de Deus sisterhood took over the administration of the structure in 1922 after a period of abandonment of the building. The mission used the structure as an orphanage. Today the structure houses the Immaculate Conception Home (Lar Imaculada Conceição) run by the Irmãs Clarissas Concepcionistas and an elementary school. It additionally operates as a tourist guest house.

== Structure ==
The structure consists two stories with a three-story bell tower and basement. Its façade consists of a large entrance door which opens directly to São Francisco Square with two choir windows. It rises to a flat cornice supporting a façade formed by a sequence of curves. The small church within the structure is dedicated to Santa Izabel. The bell tower sits to the left of the church and rises to a pyramidal structure. Germain Bazin dated the bell tower to the early 18th century. The old hospital, a two-story structure, is to the left of the bell tower. Its exterior is of stone masonry with interior walls of adobe; its windows are made of timber and tinted green. The grounds include a garden and orchard.

== Protected status ==
The Church and Convent of Santa Cruz was listed as a historic structure by the National Institute of Historic and Artistic Heritage in 1944. The IPHAN directive included the facility in the Book of Historical Works, Inscription 230 and Book of Fine Arts, fl 63. Both directives are dated January 14, 1944.

== Footnote ==
The name of the structure was translated as "Former Holy House of Mercy (hospital) – Immaculate Conception Home" in the IPHAN UNESCO World Heritage Site application of 2010.

== See also ==
- Church of Our Lady of the Rosary of Black Men
- Parish Church of Our Lady of Victory
- Church of Our Lady of Protection
- Church of the Third Order of Mount Carmel
- Church and Convent of Santa Cruz
