= São Cristóvão =

Municipality in Sergipe, Brazil

- Municipality
- Municipality of São Cristóvão
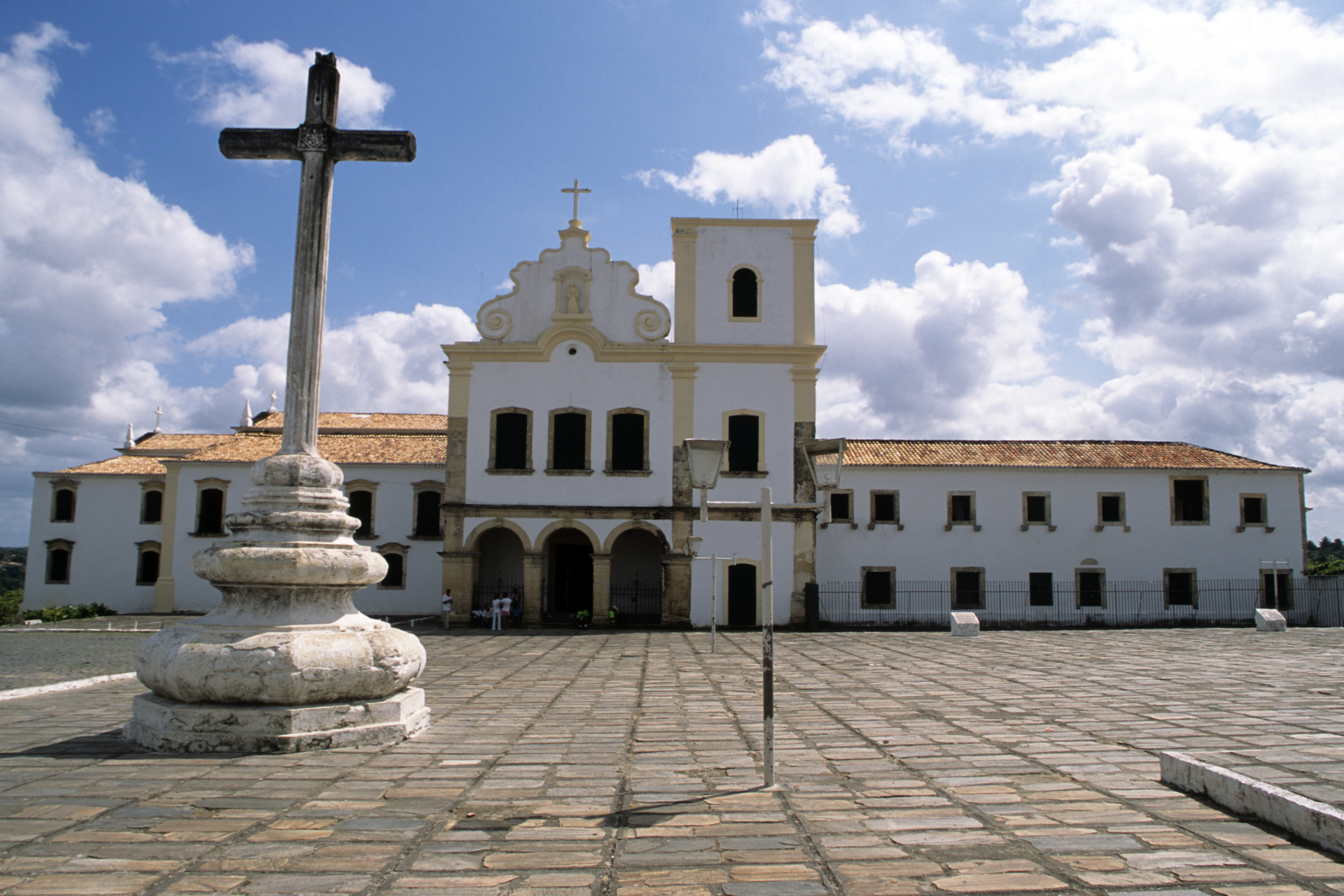
- São Francisco Square, São Cristóvão

- Flag Coat of arms

- Location of São Cristóvão in the State of Sergipe

- Location in Brazil
- Coordinates: 11°00′54″S 37°12′21″W
- Country: Brazil
- Region: Northeast Region
- State: Sergipe
- Founded: January 1, 1590

Government
  - Mayor: Marcos Santana (MDB)

Area
  - Total: 436.863 km^{2} (168.674 sq mi)
- Elevation: 47 m (154 ft)

Population (2022 Census)
  - Total: 95,612
  - Estimate (2025): 101,213
  - Density: 196.43/km^{2} (508.8/sq mi)
- Time zone: UTC−3 (BRT)
- Postal Code: 49100
- HDI (2010): 0.662 – medium
- Website: www.saocristovao.se.gov.br

UNESCO World Heritage Site
- Official name: São Francisco Square in the Town of São Cristóvão
- Type: Cultural
- Criteria: iii, vi
- Designated: 2010 (34th session)
- Reference no.: 1272
- Region: Latin America and the Caribbean

National Historic Heritage of Brazil
- Designated: 1967
- Reference no.: 785

São Cristóvão (pronounced [sɐ̃w kɾisˈtɔvɐ̃w]; lit. 'Saint Christopher') is a Brazilian municipality in the northeastern state of Sergipe. Founded at the mouth of the Vaza-Barris River on January 1, 1590, the municipality is the fourth oldest settlement in Brazil. São Cristóvão is noted for its historic city square, São Francisco Square, and numerous early colonial-period buildings. The 3 hectares (7.4 acres) site was designated a UNESCO World Heritage Site in 2010.

São Cristóvão covers 437 square kilometres (169 mi^{2}), making it the third largest settlement in the state of Sergipe behind Aracaju and Nossa Senhora do Socorro. Its population is 91,093 (est. 2020) and has a population density of 196.43 per km2 (508.8/sq mi). São Cristóvão is home to the Federal University of Sergipe, which was established in 1968.

== History ==
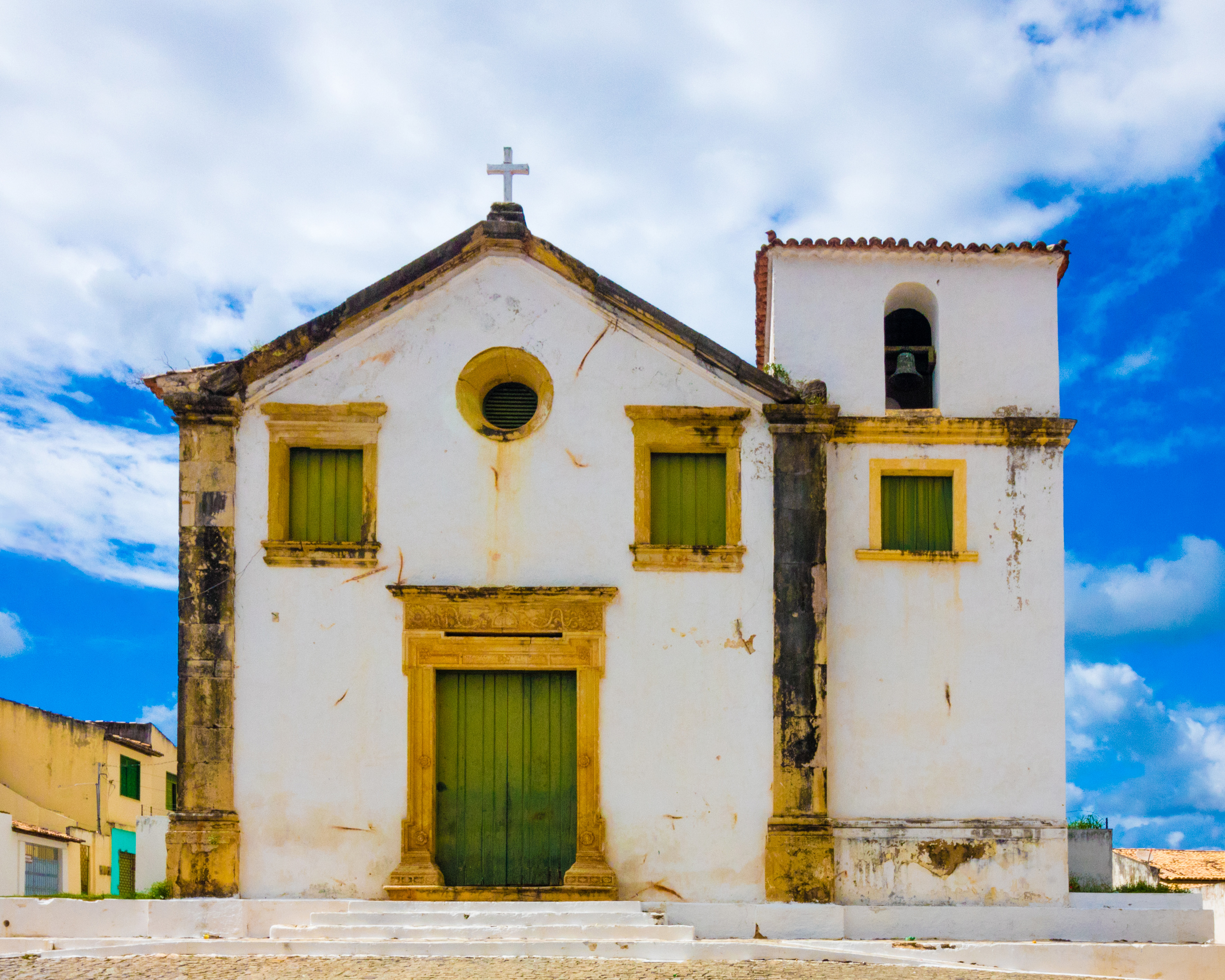
Church of our Lady of the Rosary, historically a place of worship for Afro-Brazilians in São Cristóvão

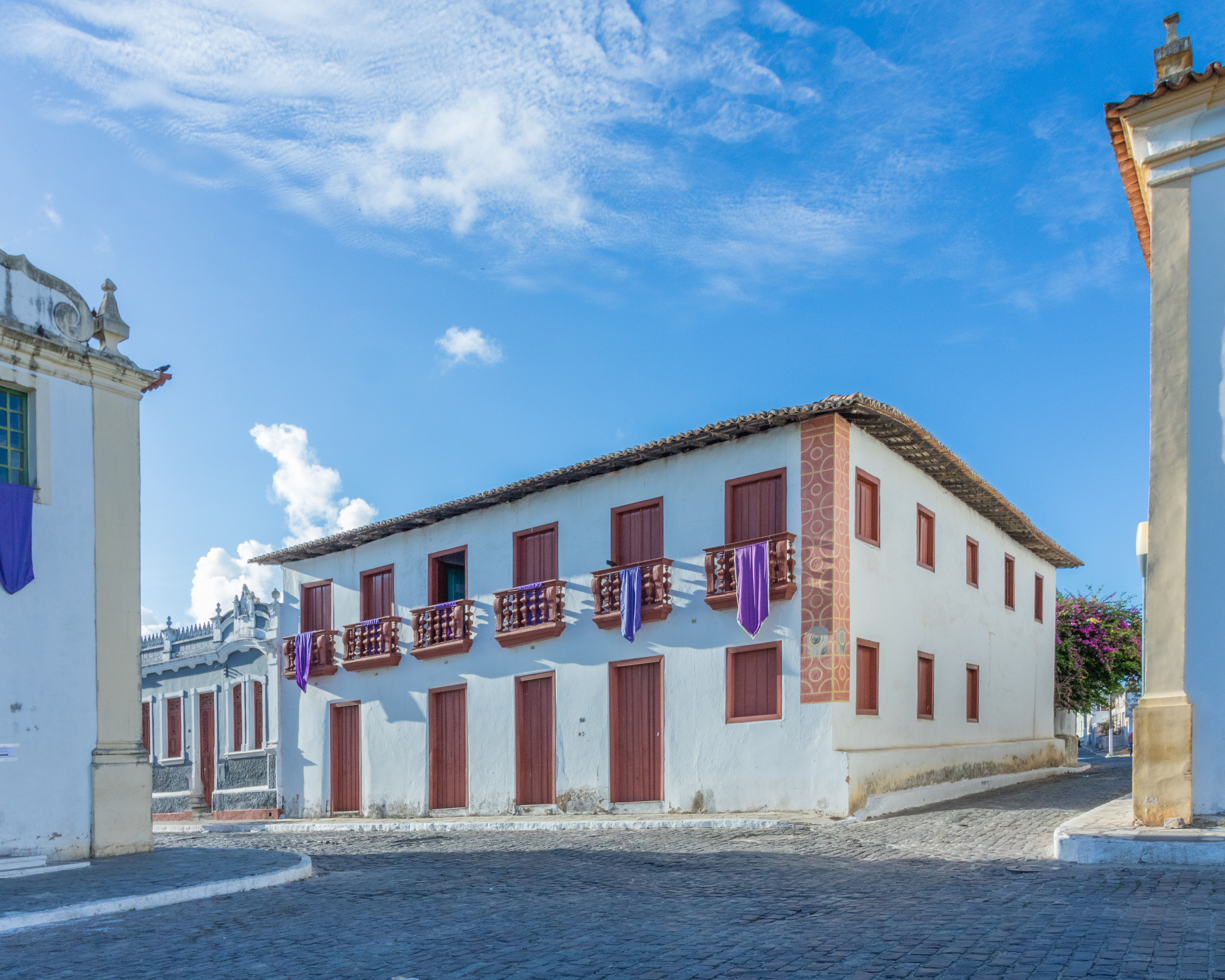
Sobrado at Rua Castro Alves, 2

São Cristóvão was established by the Portuguese (in a time when Portugal, Spain and the Naples kingdoms were under the rule of Philip II of Spain) as one of the first colonization attempts in Sergipe, which makes the city the fourth oldest one in Brazil. In 1590 the Portuguese sent Cristóvão de Barros to both subjugate the region to colonial rule and establish a safe trading port between Salvador and Pernambuco. De Barros quickly and violently defeated the local population, which consisted of people of mixed Tupinambá and French heritage who maintained a trade in Brazilwood. As a symbol of his victory De Barros founded a small village named for his patron saint, Saint Christopher near the mouth of the Cotindiba River. The first Catholic parish in Sergipe was subsequently established in São Cristóvão in 1608. The Parish Church of Our Lady of Victory of São Cristóvão (Igreja Nossa Senhora das Vitórias de São Cristóvão) was built as the parish church; it remained the only parish in Sergipe until the late 17th century.

The village moved to an approximately horizontal plateau on the banks of the Paramopema River due to ongoing conflicts with indigenous peoples and the Dutch invasion in 1637. The new location was near the confluence of the Sergipe or Vaza Barris River. The urban layout, creating three squares, forms a grid pattern extending from the Chapel of Ajuda and the Franciscan convent to the Parish Church of Our Lady of Victory and the Carmelite convent.

The development of the town followed the Portuguese urban model: the higher town, with the headquarters of civil and religious powers; and the lower town, with the harbour, factories, the low income population. The economy of São Cristóvão initially depended on the establishment of cattle herds for meat, milk, and leather. The settlement was completely destroyed by the Dutch in 1637. Tobacco and sugarcane plantations were established in the 17th century, and remained into the modern period.

São Cristóvão was the capital of the Province of Sergipe from the time of the Independence of Brazil in 1822.

The provincial president Inácio Joaquim Barbosa transferred the capital of Sergipe from São Cristóvão to coastal Aracaju in 1855. São Cristóvão was seen as outdated, too far from the coast, and unable to expand to meet the needs of a growing state. The transfer was a "traumatic process" for the residents of São Cristóvão, many of whom left to live in Aracaju. São Cristóvão fell into slow decay, with numerous buildings left empty or even abandoned.

=== 20th century ===
The importance of São Cristóvão as a historic and cultural center of Sergipe was recognized early in the 20th century. The National Institute of Historic and Artistic Heritage (IPHAN, originally SPHAN) was established in 1937 and undertook a great survey of colonial-period architecture in Brazil. The survey included numerous sites in São Cristóvão, which were designated federal monuments as early as 1943.

In 1967, the city was designated a national monument to preserve its colonial architecture, and it is now home to ten national heritage sites of Brazil. Among the important sacred buildings are the Church and Convent of Santa Cruz (also known as the Church and Convent of São Francisco, which date from 1693), the Misericórdia Hospital and Church (Santa Casa de Misericordia, the 17th-century Sisters of Mercy hospital), the Chapel of the Immaculate Conception of Mary (1751), the Parish Church of Our Lady of Victory (1608) and several other important churches from the 18th century, including the Church of Our Lady of the Rosary of Black Men, the Church of Our Lady of Protection, and the Church and Convent of Mount Carmel. Ten national or state heritage sites are located in or near the city center; two, the Chapel of Our Lady of the Conception of Engenho Poxim and the Church of Our Lady of Nazareth of Engenho Itaperoá, are abandoned and on sugarcane plantations far from the city center.

The religious sites of São Cristóvão remain an important center of Roman Catholic pilgrimage in Brazil. The Museum of Sacred Art of the Church and Convent of São Francisco is considered the third most important in Brazil.

== São Francisco Square ==
São Francisco Square (Praça São Francisco) is an open space surrounded by colonial-period buildings such as the São Francisco Church and convent, the Church and Santa Casa da Misericórdia, the Provincial Palace and other buildings from later periods. The complex is a well-preserved example of typical Franciscan architecture of north-eastern Brazil. On August 1, 2010 the site, which covers 3 hectares (7.4 acres), was selected as a World Heritage Site by UNESCO. It is managed by a regional office of the National Institute of Historic and Artistic Heritage (IPHAN) and the municipal government.

== Historic structures ==
Churches

- Church and Convent of Santa Cruz, or Convent of Saint Francis and the Church of the Good Jesus of Glory, now the Sacred Art Museum (Portuguese: Igreja e Convento de Santa Cruz)
- Misericórdia Hospital and Church (Portuguese: Igreja e Santa Casa da Misericórdia)
- Church of Our Lady of the Rosary of Black Men (Portuguese: Igreja de Nossa Senhora do Rosário dos Homens Pretos
- Church of Our Lady of Protection (Portuguese: Igreja de Nossa Senhora do Amparo)
- Church and Convent of Mount Carmel (Portuguese: Igreja e Convento do Carmo)
- Church of the Third Order of Mount Carmel (Portuguese: Igreja da Ordem Terceira do Carmo)
- Parish Church of Our Lady of Victory (Portuguese: Igreja Matriz de Nossa Senhora da Vitória)

Residences

- Sobrado at Rua Castro Alves, 2 (Portuguese: Sobrado à Rua Castro Alves, 2)
- Sobrado at Rua da Matriz (Portuguese: Sobrado à Rua da Matriz)
- Sobrado at Rua das Flores (Portuguese: Sobrado à Rua das Flores)

Rural chapels

- Chapel of Our Lady of the Conception of Engenho Poxim (Portuguese: Capela de Nossa Senhora da Conceição do Engenho Poxim)
- Church of Our Lady of Nazareth of Engenho Itaperoá (Portuguese: Igreja de Nossa Senhora de Nazaré do Antigo Engenho Itaperoá)

== Economy ==
The city is a shipping port, and its main industries are sugar milling and distilling.

== See also ==
- List of municipalities in Sergipe
