= Chapel of Our Lady of the Conception of Engenho Poxim =

Roman Catholic church in Sergipe, Brazil

- Capela de Nossa Senhora da Conceição do Engenho Poxim
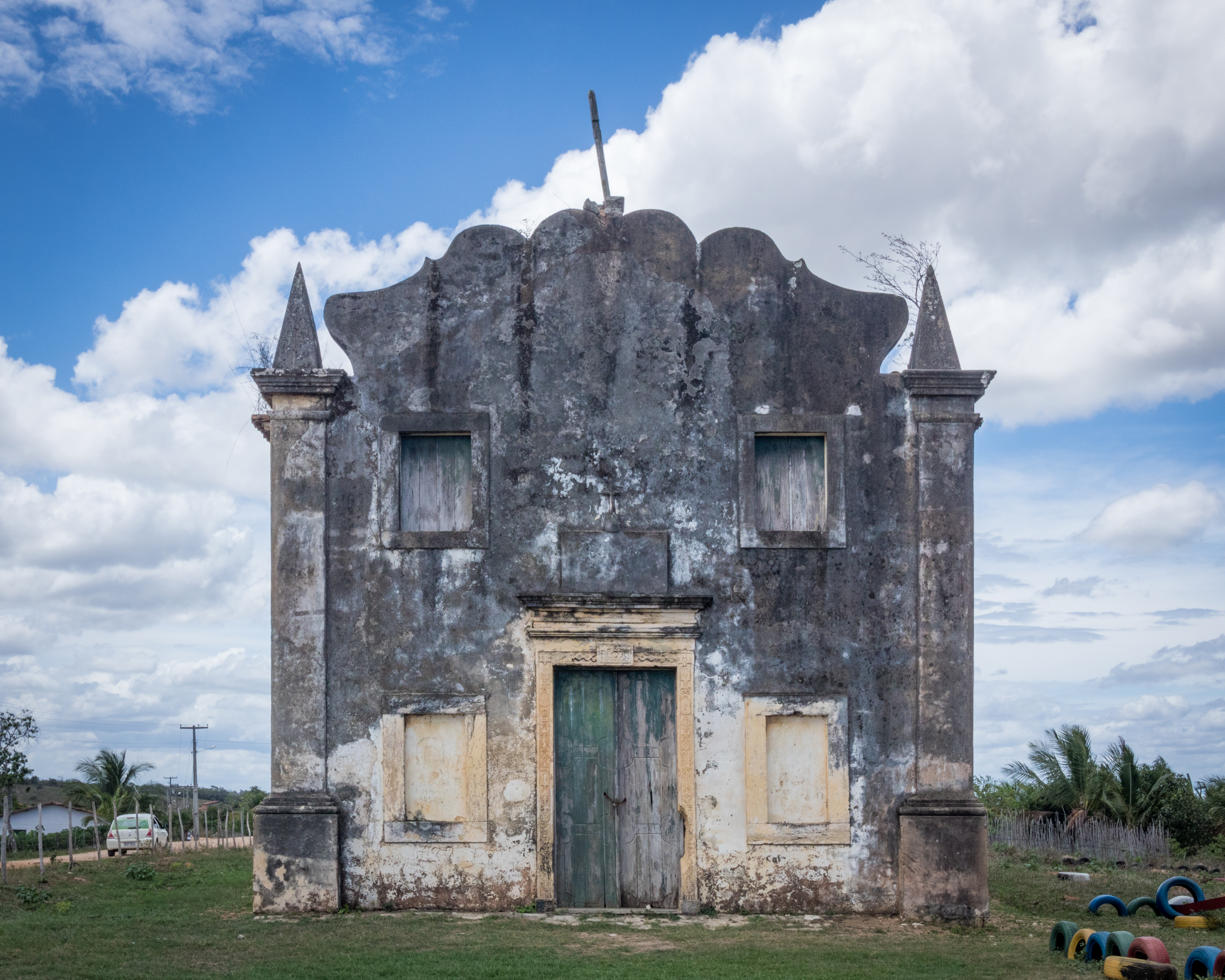
- Chapel of Our Lady of the Conception of Engenho Poxim in São Cristóvão

- Location of the Chapel of Our Lady of the Conception of Engenho Poxim in Brazil

Religion
- Affiliation: Catholic
- Rite: Roman Rite
- Status: Abandoned

Location
- Municipality: São Cristóvão
- State: Sergipe
- Country: Brazil
- Interactive map of Chapel of Our Lady of the Conception of Engenho Poxim
- Coordinates: 10.891718°S 37.23771°W

Architecture
- Style: Baroque
- Established: 1751
- Direction of façade: North

National Historic Heritage of Brazil
- Designated: 1943
- Reference no.: 298-T

The Chapel of Our Lady of the Conception of Engenho Poxim (Portuguese: Capela de Nossa Senhora da Conceição do Engenho Poxim) is an 18th-century Roman Catholic church in São Cristóvão, Sergipe, Brazil. It was built as part of the Engenho Poxim sugarcane plantation, which existed along the Poxim Açu River, a small branch of the Poxim River, in the southwest of the municipality of São Cristóvão. The church is located in a remote, rural setting in the present-day Rosa Luxemburgo II settlement. It was listed as a historic structure by National Institute of Historic and Artistic Heritage (IPHAN) in 1943. It church has fallen into a state of neglect and lacks the interior elements present at the time of its survey and federal historical designation.

== History ==
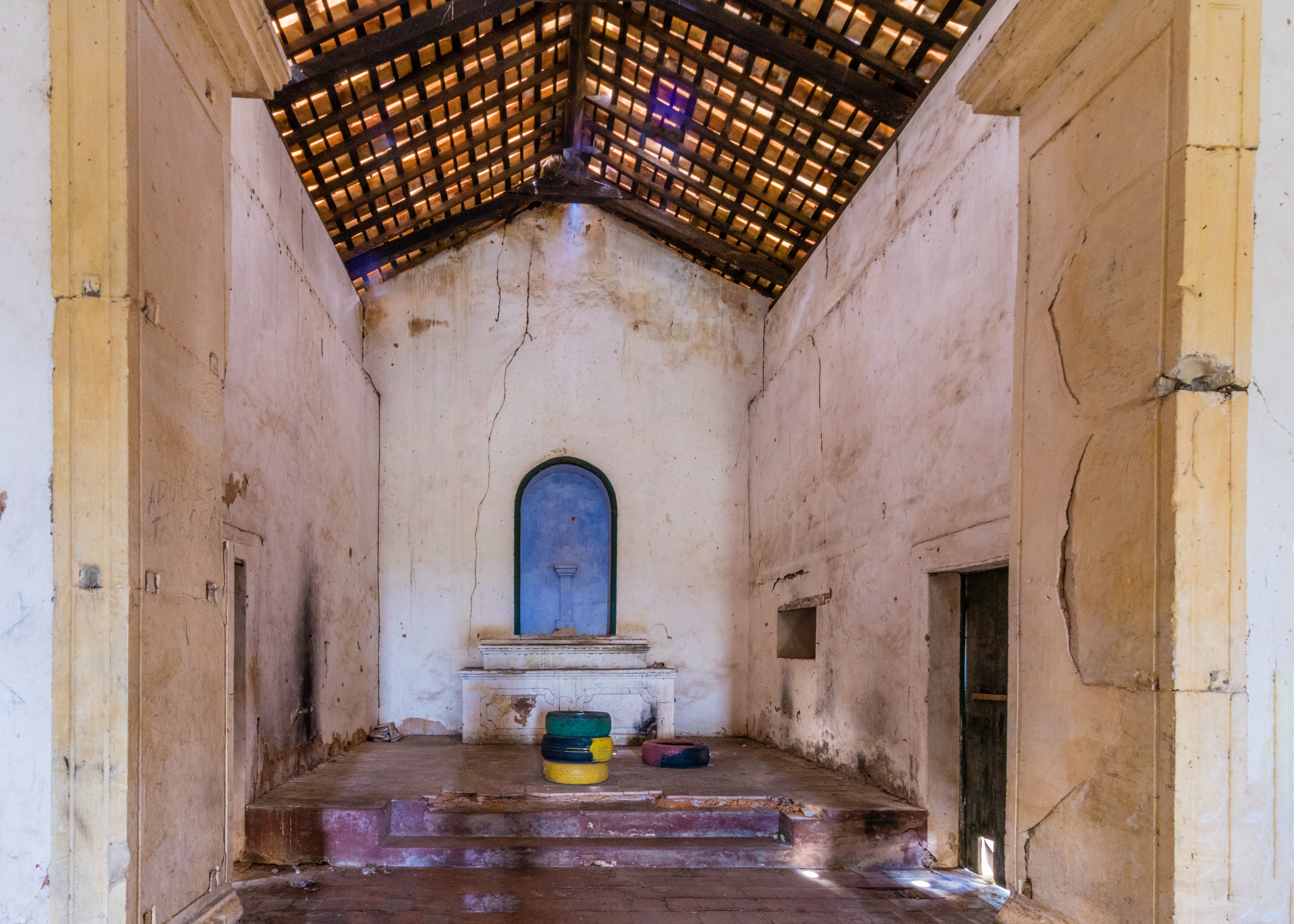
Altar of the Chapel

The chapel is a remaining structure of Engenho Poxim, a sugar cane plantation. A plaque above the portal of the church is dated 1751. According to records taken at the time of its inspection by IPHAN in 1943, the chapel was under the management of Edgar Rosemberg by the mid-20th century. The chapel was in reasonable condition during a survey in 1947, but had steadily deteriorated according to inspections in 1968 and 1971. It remains in a state of disrepair with few interior elements and is now nominally managed by IPHAN.

== Structure ==
=== Exterior ===
The Chapel of Our Lady of the Conception of Engenho Poxim is built in a simple Brazilian Baroque style typical of rural churches in the region in the 18th century. The chapel has a single door of wood in a worked stone doorway with phytomorphic motifs. It is topped by a straight stone lintel with simple entablature. Two false windows sit on either side of the doorway; a historical survey states they had true windows in the past. Parallel windows are above with wood shutters. The façade has a broad, curvilinear pediment surmounted by a crucifix. Two simple spires flank either side of the pediment. The church has a gable roof of timber and cement. The base of a crucifix sits in the churchyard; the crucifix is now missing.

=== Interior ===
The table of the altar is stone topped by a wood niche. The IPHAN survey of 1943 describes a wood pulpit with stone base and a baptismal font in decorated stone. Both the pulpit and baptismal font are now absent from the building. There are at least two burials in church floor with inscribed slabs; one may be of Thereza Maria de Jesus (1819-1855), consort of a wealth landowner in Sergipe.

== Protected status ==
The Chapel of Our Lady of the Conception of Engenho Poxim was listed as a historic structure by the National Institute of Historic and Artistic Heritage in 1943. Both the structure and its contents were included in the IPHAN directive, which include Book of Historical Works, Inscription 298-T, inscription no. 225 and Book of Fine Arts, Inscription fls. 62. Both directives are dated September 21, 1943.

== More information ==
InfoPatrimônio (only in Portuguese)
