= Church and Convent of Santa Cruz =

Building in São Cristóvão, Sergipe, Brazil

- Igreja e Convento de Santa Cruz
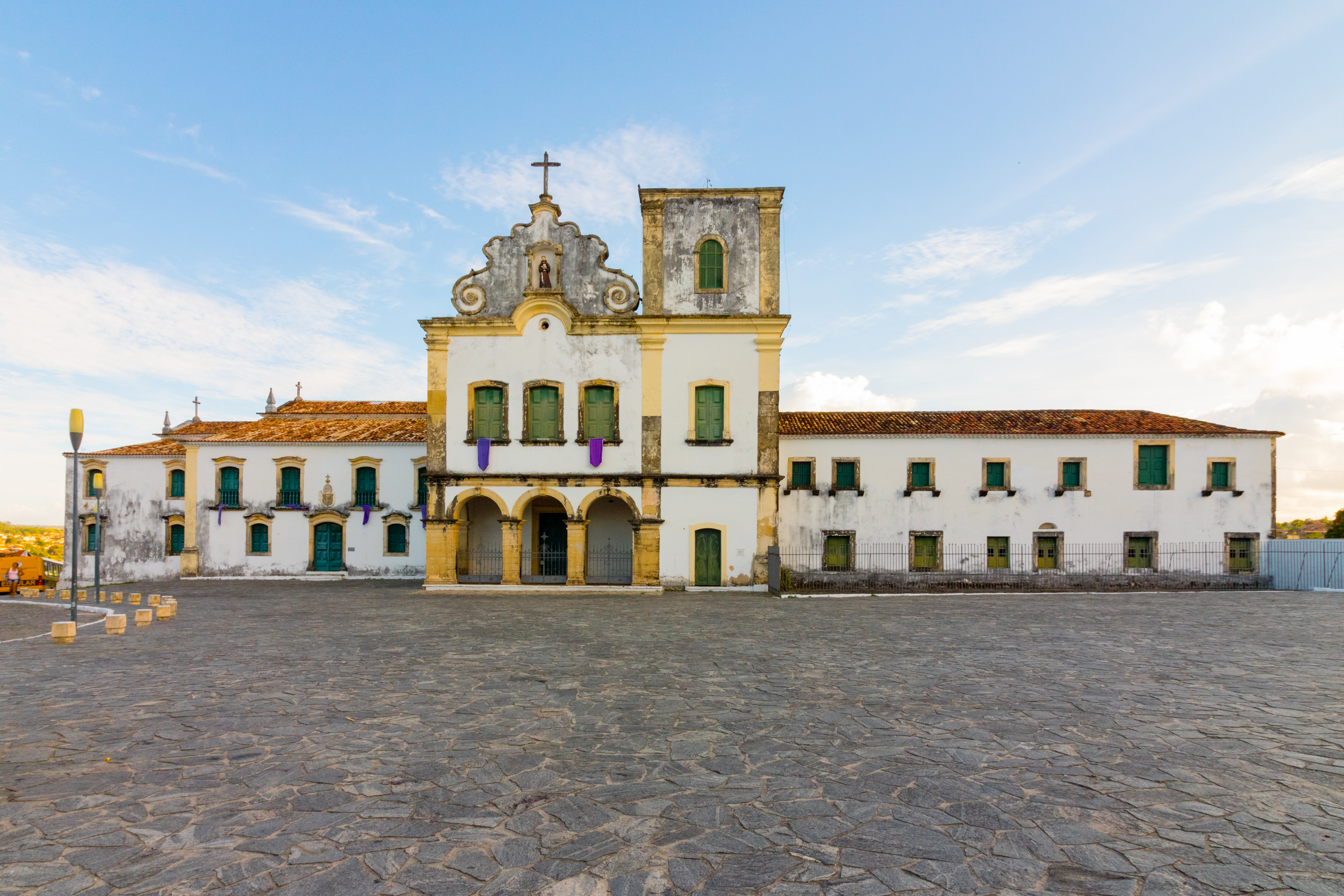
- Façade of Church and Convent of Santa Cruz

- Location of the Church and Convent of São Francisco in Brazil

Religion
- Affiliation: Catholic
- Rite: Roman Rite
- Year consecrated: 1693
- Status: Active

Location
- Municipality: São Cristóvão
- State: Sergipe
- Country: Brazil
- Interactive map of Church and Convent of Santa Cruz
- Coordinates: 11°00′47.2″S 37°12′19.3″W

Architecture
- Style: Baroque
- Direction of façade: South

National Historic Heritage of Brazil
- Designated: 1941
- Reference no.: 303

The Church and Convent of Santa Cruz (Portuguese: Igreja e Convento de Santa Cruz), also known as the Church and Convent of São Francisco (Portuguese: Igreja e Convento de São Francisco) is a 17th-century Roman Catholic structure located in São Cristóvão, Sergipe, Brazil. It is built in the Baroque style and occupies the north of São Francisco Square. The Church and Convent of Santa Cruz was listed as a historic structure by National Institute of Historic and Artistic Heritage (IPHAN) in 1943. The facility is part of the UNESCO World Heritage Site of São Francisco Square in the Town of São Cristóvão.

== Location ==
The Church and Convent of Santa Cruz is located on a large slope of land with its façade facing São Francisco Square. It is in close proximity to the Misericórdia Hospital and Church of São Cristóvão, and sits opposite of the Historical Museum of Sergipe.

== Structure ==
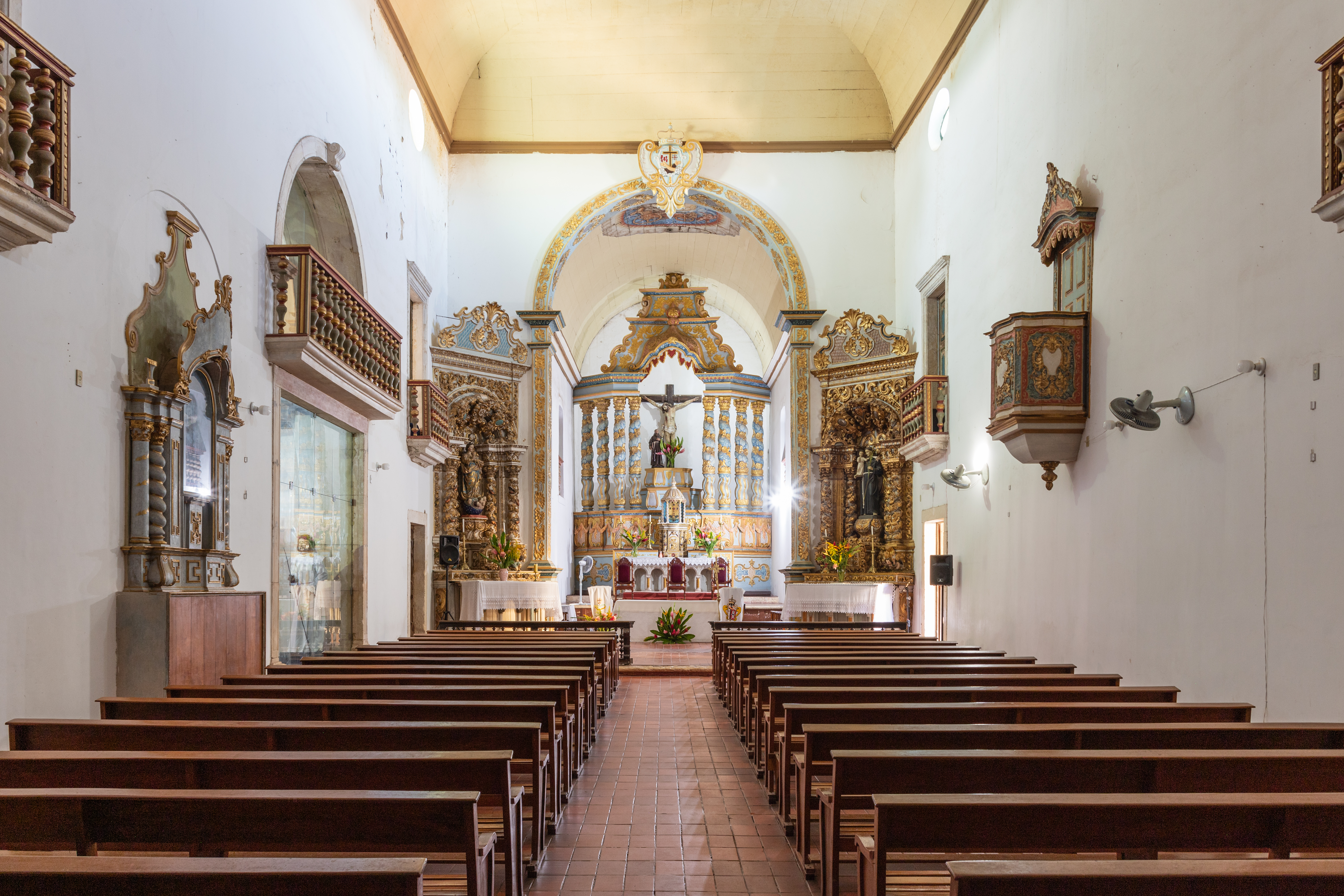
View of chapel interior

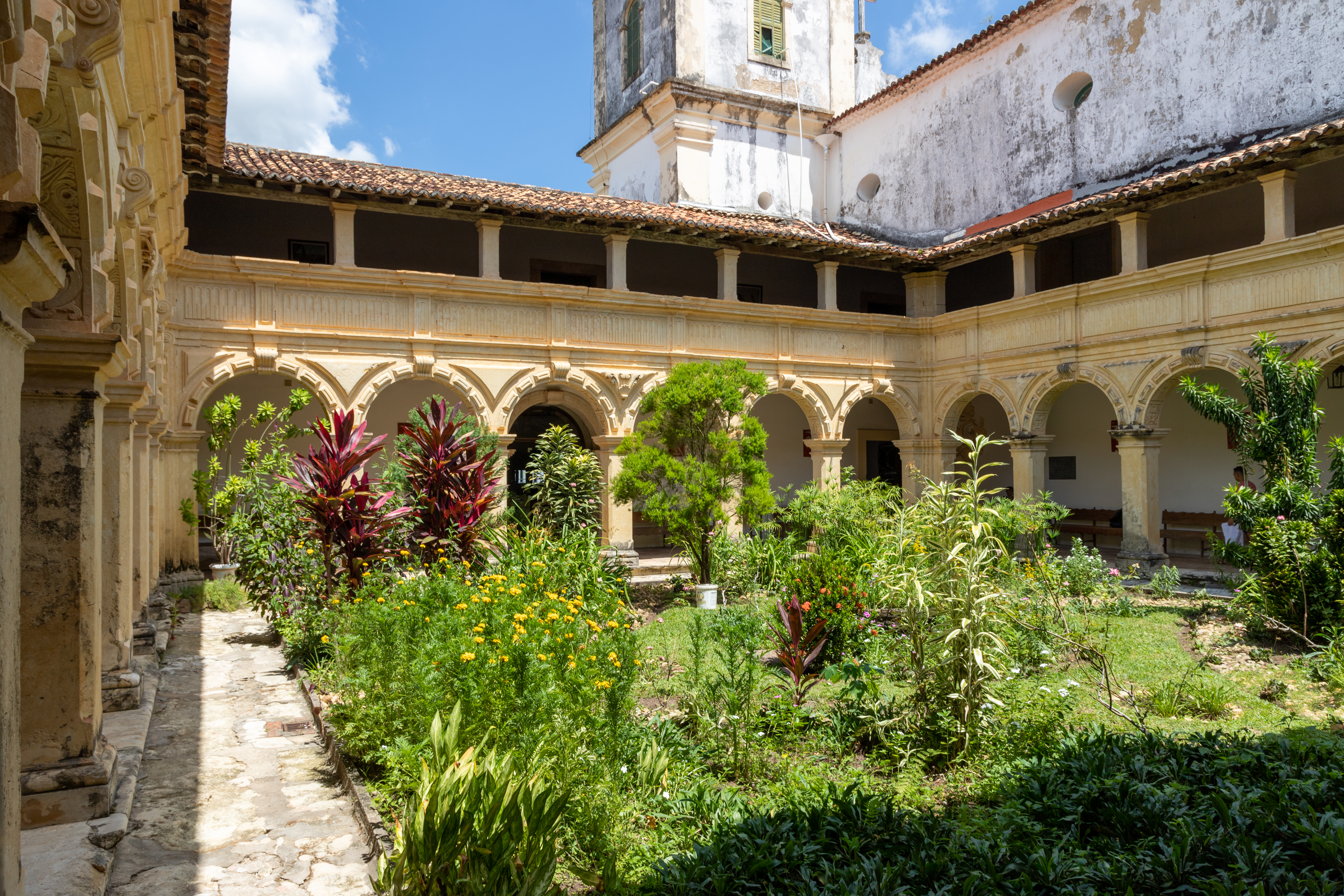
View of cloister

The Church and Convent of Santa Cruz is sprawling two-story structure built around a cloister. The structure covers 2,195.97 square metres (23,637.2 ft^{2}) on a 18,904.58 square metres (203,487.2 ft^{2}) plot of land. It occupies the entire north side of São Francisco Square. The façade has three horizontal levels: an arcade with church portals at ground level, a choir level above, and a Baroque-style pediment at top. It is flanked by a three-story bell tower at right.

=== Cloister ===
The two-story cloister is a common feature of Franciscan convents in the Northeast of Brazil. The cloister of the church and convent in São Cristóvão was likely completed in 1730. It has square pillars with chamfered angles and carved floral motifs. The art historian Germain Bazin stated that it is an "original work [...] in the baroque spirit, breaks with the intentional classicism of the other cloisters; it corresponds to the taste for sculptural ornamentation which characterizes the Sergipe region, where there were fine limestone rocks available."

== Museum of Sacred Art of São Cristóvão ==
The Museum of Sacred Art of São Cristóvão (Portuguese: Museu de Arte Sacra de São Cristóvão) is located in a wing of the Third Order Church. It was opened in 1974 under an agreement between the Archdiocese of Aracaju, the Federal University of Sergipe, and the state government of Sergipe. The museum consists of sacred art both from churches in São Cristóvão and the chapels of sugar cane plantations, most now in ruins. Pieces in the collection date from the 17th to the early 20th century, and includes sculptures, furniture, and vestments.

== Protected status ==
The Church and Convent of Santa Cruz was listed as a historic structure by the National Institute of Historic and Artistic Heritage in 1941. The IPHAN directive included the facility in the Book of Historical Works, Inscription 303 and Book of Fine Arts, Inscription 55. Both directives are dated December 29, 1941.

== Footnote ==
The name of the structure was translated as "Church and Convent of the Saint Cross--St. Francis Monastery" in the IPHAN UNESCO World Heritage Site application of 2010.

== See also ==
- Church of Our Lady of the Rosary of Black Men (São Cristóvão)
- Parish Church of Our Lady of Victory
- Church of Our Lady of Protection
- Church of the Third Order of Mount Carmel
- Misericórdia Hospital and Church
