= Church of the Third Order of Mount Carmel (São Cristóvão) =

Roman Catholic church in Sergipe, Brazil

- Igreja da Ordem Terceira do Carmo
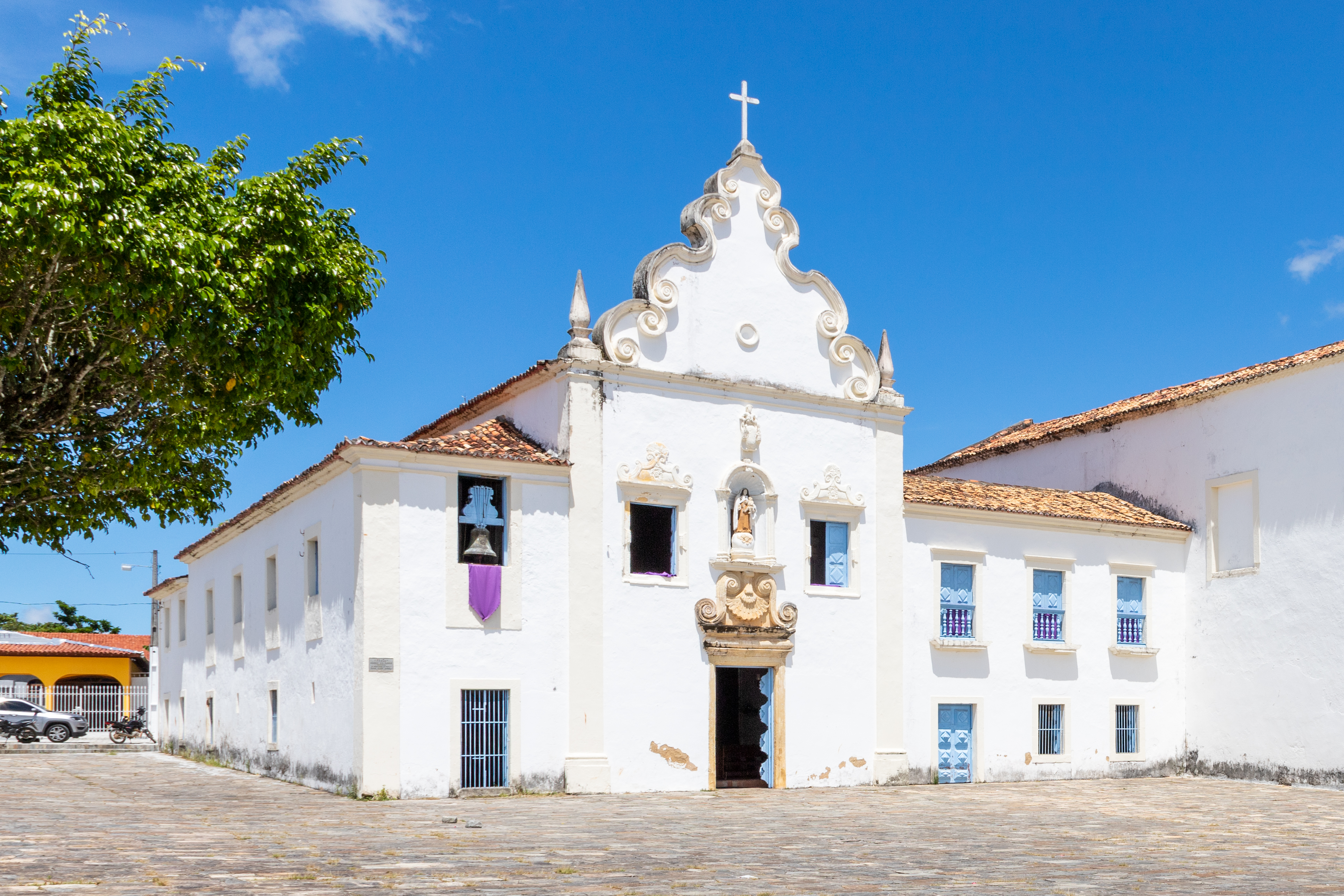
- Façade of the Third Order of Mount Carmel

- Location of the Church and Convent of Mount Carmel in Brazil

Religion
- Affiliation: Catholic
- Rite: Roman Rite

Location
- Municipality: São Cristóvão
- State: Sergipe
- Country: Brazil
- Interactive map of Church of the Third Order of Mount Carmel
- Coordinates: 11.015675°S 37.207179°W

Architecture
- Style: Baroque
- Completed: 1743
- Direction of façade: North

National Historic Heritage of Brazil
- Designated: 1941
- Reference no.: 949

The Church of the Third Order of Mount Carmel (Portuguese: Igreja da Ordem Terceira do Carmo) is an 18th-century Roman Catholic church in São Cristóvão, Sergipe, Brazil. Along with the First Order Church and Convent of Mount Carmel, it forms a large-scale religious complex at the south of the cidade alta, or upper city, of the town. The Third Order church was completed in 1739 after the First Order Church and Monastery; the two form a harmonious whole. The Carmlite complex is part of the UNESCO World Heritage Site of São Francisco Square; it was separatedly listed as a historic structure by the National Institute of Historic and Artistic Heritage (IPHAN) in 1941.

== History ==
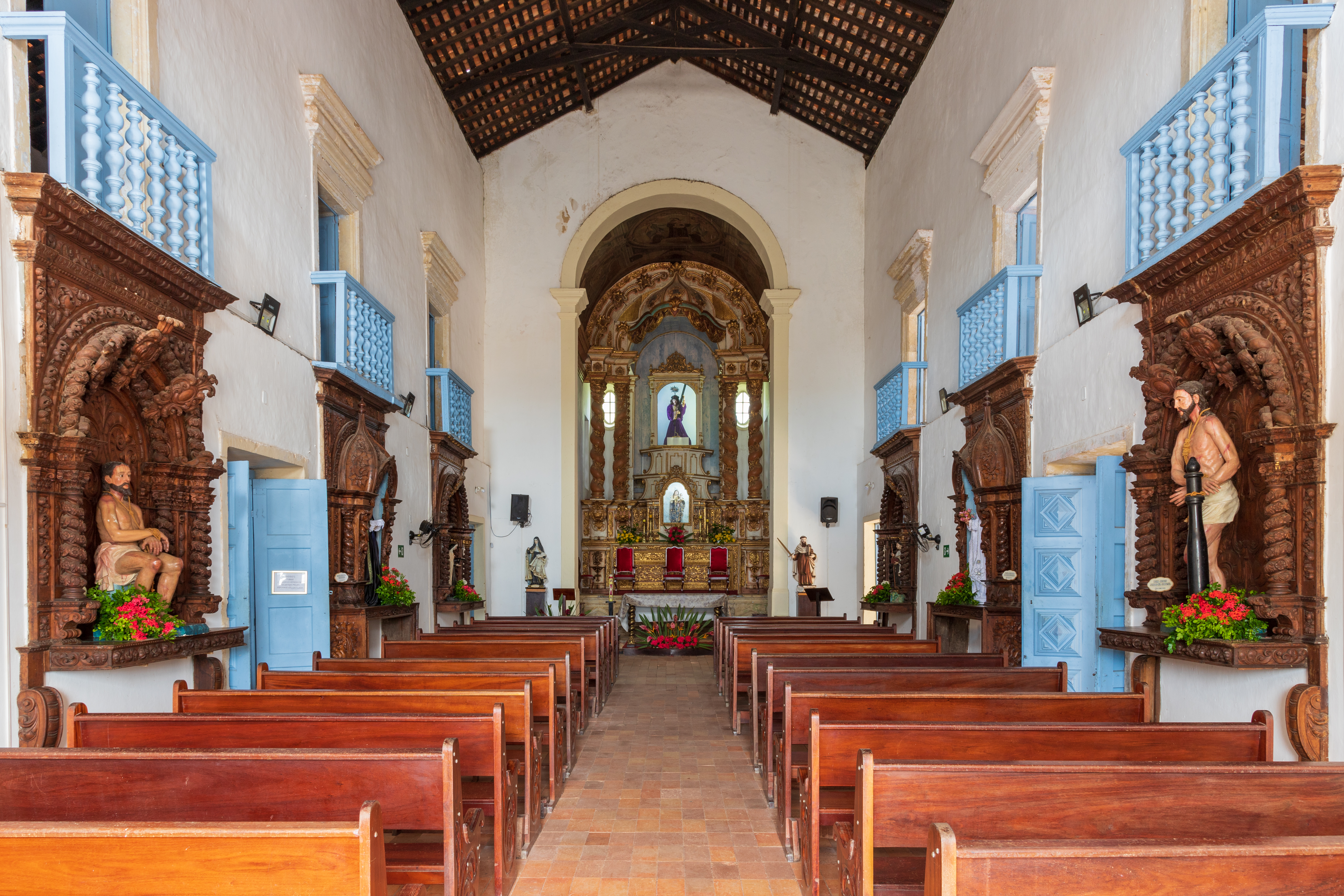
Interior, Church of the Third Order of Mount Carmel

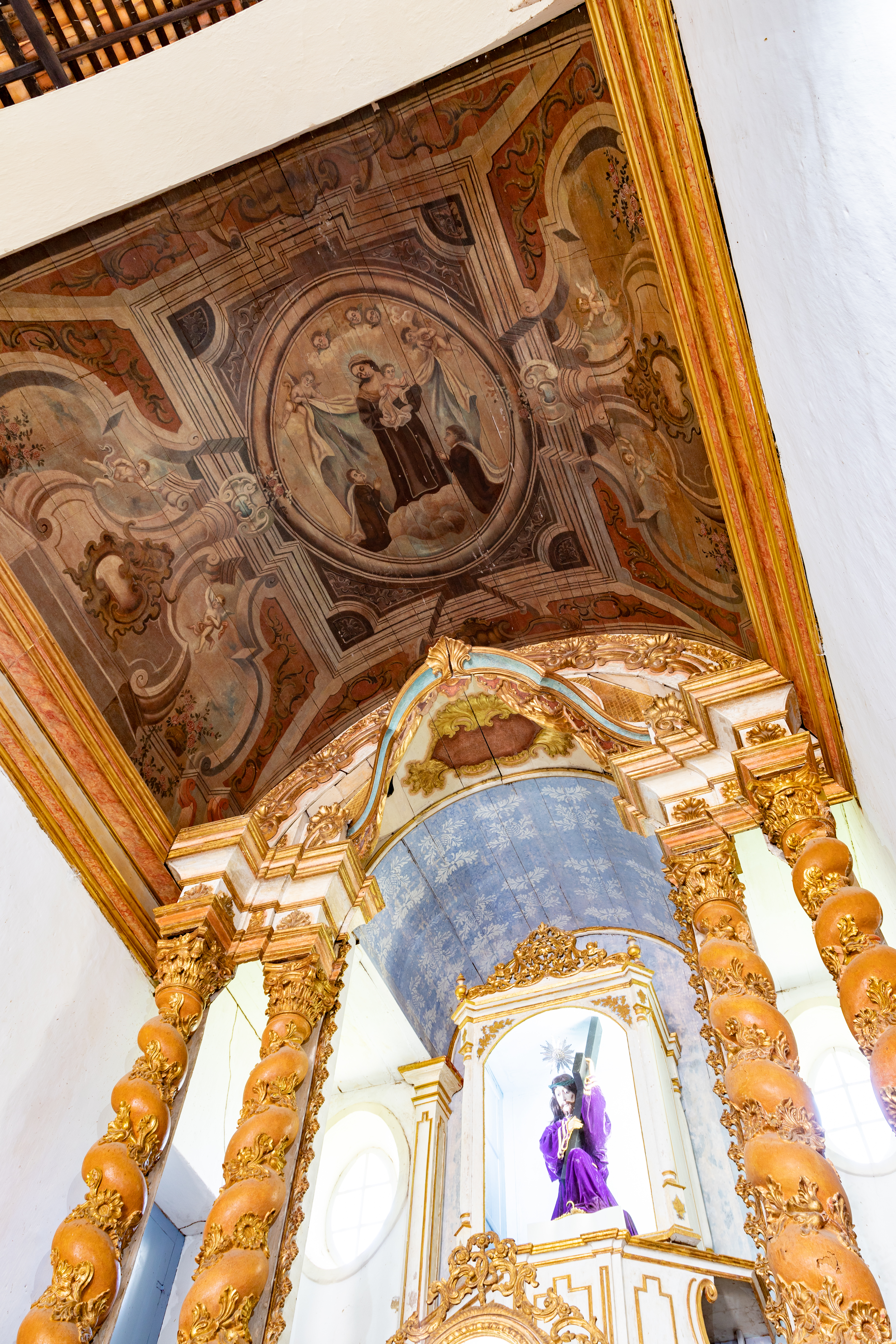
Painting of the chancel ceiling, Church of the Third Order of Mount Carmel

The history of the construction of the Carmelite complex in São Cristóvão is unclear. The Carmelites entered São Cristóvão by the early 17th century and built at least a convent; its extence was verified during the Dutch occupation of São Cristóvão from 1636 to 1644. The Dutch destroyed São Cristóvão during their retreat, and the First Order Church and Convent were constructed beginning in 1699. The Third Order church was founded on July 16, 1739, according to an inscription on its facade, and construction likely completed in 1743, according to a date on the lintel of the central portal.

The churches of São Cristóvão suffered greatly after the state capital was moved from the town to Aracaju. The political elite in São Cristóvão were left with few resources to maintain religious structures, and the historian Serafim Santiago said that "in São Cristovão [the former] capital of Sergipe you will only find ruins of these Churches." The Brotherhood of the Third Order of Mount Carmel fell into dispute in the same period. A candle melted and caused a fire on a side altar on the morning of June 19, 1874. The image of the patron saint was damaged, and the Brotherhood hired Torquato, an artist, to create a new image. The fire was followed by an accusation of theft from the Brotherhood, a dispute that involved most of the political elite of São Cristóvão.

== Structure ==
The Church of the Third Order of Mount Carmel, like many third order churches in Brazil, has a simple façade with a richly decorated interior. It sits back from the First Order church, with a single door and two windows at the choir level. The pediment is less ornate than that of the First Order church, outlined with volutes with a filled oculus at center. The central portal has an ornate, baroque-style limestone ashlar pediment with a shell motif at center and volutes at left and right. The windows at the choir level have similar stylized pediments in limestone. A niche with an image of Our Lady of Mount Carmel sits between the windows of the choir level and above the central portal; it is surmounted by an inscribed cartouche.

The interior of the chapel has a single nave with a choir and chancel. There are six side altars with richly carved wood, but lacking paint or gilding. Each side altar has a slightly different motif in the wood carving. The chancel is shallow with a richly decorated retable; the ceiling of the chancel has a painting. A small cloister sits next to the chapel.

== Votive Museum ==
A small museum of votive offerings is located to the left of the nave.

== Access ==
Church of the Third Order of Mount Carmel and votive museum are open to the public and may be visited.

== See also ==
- Church of the Third Order of Mount Carmel, Salvador, Bahia
- Parish Church of Our Lady of Victory
- Church of Our Lady of Protection
