= São Francisco Square =

São Francisco Square in the Town of São Cristóvão
UNESCO World Heritage Site
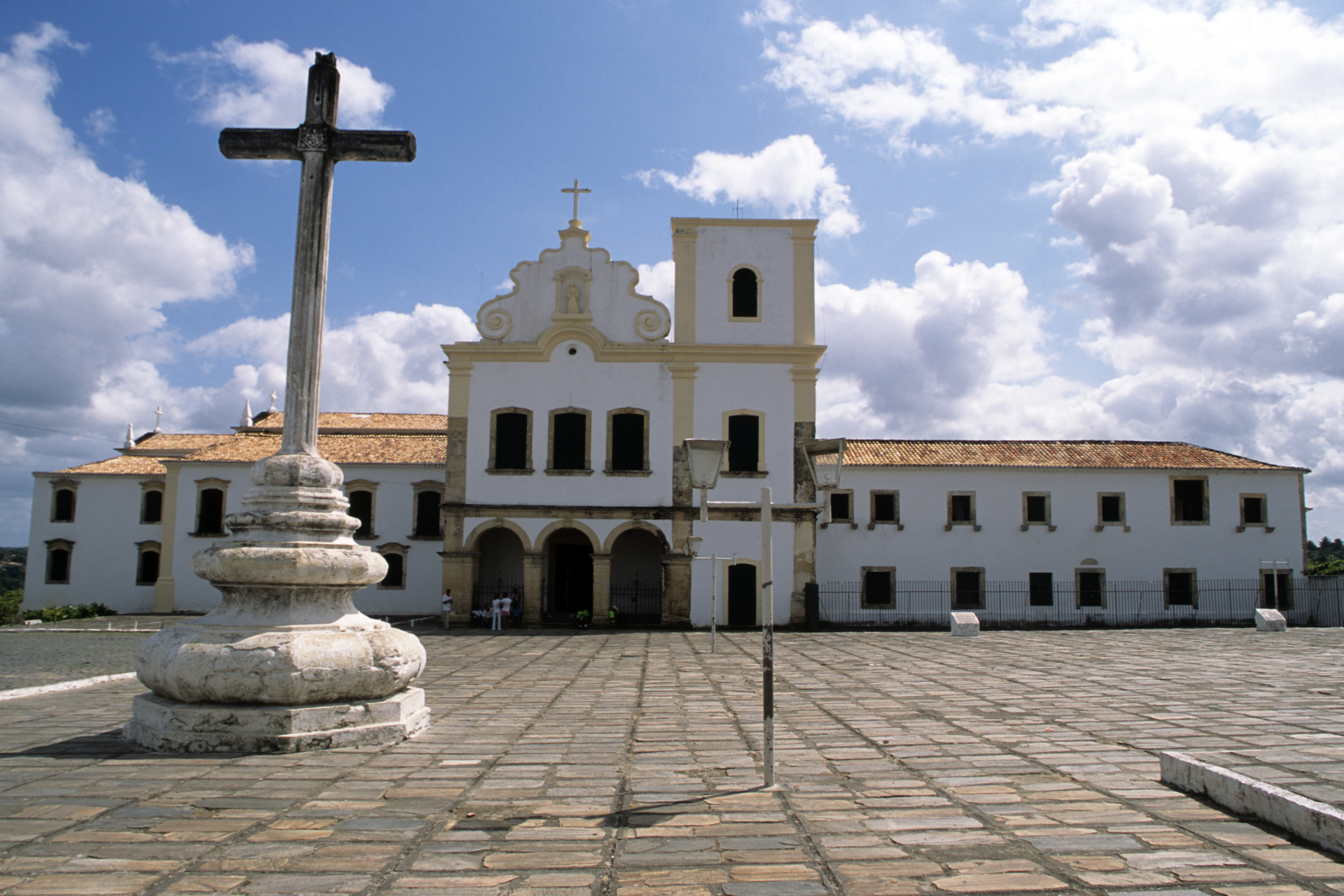
- São Francisco Square

- Location within Brazil
- Location: São Cristóvão, Sergipe, Brazil
- Criteria: Cultural: (ii)(iv)
- Reference: 1272rev
- Inscription: 2010 (34th Session)
- Area: 3 ha (7.4 acres)
- Buffer zone: 2,500 ha (6,200 acres)
- Coordinates: 11°00′58″S 37°12′36″W

São Francisco Square (Portuguese: Praça São Francisco) is a historic plaza in São Cristóvão, Sergipe, Brazil. The square, or praça, is an open space surrounded by Portuguese colonial-period buildings such as the Church and Convent of Santa Cruz (São Francisco Church), the Misericórdia Hospital and Church, the Provincial Palace and buildings from later periods. The complex is a well-preserved example of both the Spanish colonial and the Portuguese Franciscan architecture of north-eastern Brazil.

São Francisco Square is a stone-paved, open space measuring 73 metres (240 ft) by 51 metres (167 ft). Its configuration reflects both Spanish and Portuguese influence, being organized as a plaza mayor, the typical public space of Spanish colonial cities, following the prescriptions of the Codigo Philippino, a code of laws introduced by the Iberian Union of Spain and Portugal in 1603. The urban design of the city developed along the colonial Portuguese model after the end the union in 1640. The square represents a rare example of the fusion of colonial Spanish and Portuguese city planning. São Francisco Square is ringed by religious, administrative, and residential structures; in time additional religious and residential structures were constructed just beyond the square proper.

On August 1, 2010 the site, which covers 3 hectares (7.4 acres), was selected as a World Heritage Site by UNESCO. It is managed by a regional office of the National Institute of Historic and Artistic Heritage (IPHAN) and the municipal government.

== History ==
São Cristóvão was divided into two distinct zones: the lower city, or cidade baixa, where the port, factories and popular houses were located; upper city, or cidade alta, located on the top of a hill. São Francisco Square developed as the focal point of the upper city, and came to house headquarters of colonial civil, military, and religious institutions. It also offered a strategic military vantage point to monitor the lower city, the land regions around São Cristóvão, and the Atlantic Ocean coast.

São Cristóvão was invaded by the Dutch in 1634 as part of the Dutch invasion of Brazil. Luso-Spanish troops, under the command of the Count of Bagnoli, destroyed crops, scattered cattle, and called for the population to desert. The Dutch, who found a semi-deserted city, completed the destruction of both São Cristóvão and structures around the square. In 1645,

The Dutch were expelled from Sergipe in 1645 and left the city in ruins. The captaincy of Sergipe was annexed to Bahia at the end of the 17th century and São Cristóvão becomes the regional administrative center, with its administrative buildings centered around the square. The city and plaza were attacked by both inhabitants of Vila Nova, who objected to Portuguese tax collection; and an invasion in 1763 by mocambos, or fugitive Afro-Brazilian slaves, and indigenous peoples.

== Access ==
São Cristóvão Square is located 26 kilometres (16 mi) from the state capital of Aracaju. Most of its historic buildings are open to the public and can be visited.
