= Timeline of Salvador, Bahia =

Coordinates: 12.974722°S 38.476667°W

The following is a timeline of the history of the city of Salvador, Bahia state, Brazil.

== Early history ==
- 1502 - Amerigo Vespucci names the bay in honour to his hometown parish church "San Salvatore di Ognissanti" (San Salvador de Todos os Santos) in Florence
- 1549 - Brazilian capital established at Bahia by Tomé de Sousa.
- 1551 - Catholic Diocese of São Salvador da Bahia de Todos os Santos established.
- 1624 - Capture of Salvador da Bahia by the Dutch
- 1625 - Recapture of Salvador da Bahia by Spanish-Portuguese forces.
- 1635 - Third Order of St. Francis active.
- 1636 - Church of the Third Order of Saint Francis established.
- 1638 - Siege of Salvador da Bahia
- 1672 - Cathedral of Salvador consecrated
- 1674 - Mint established.
- 1676 - Salvador becomes "metropolitan see of the colony's archbishopric."
- 1704 - Church of the Third Order of Our Lady of the Rosary construction begins.
- 1711 - Maneta Revolt, two uprisings (Oct. 17 and Dec. 2) by military and public officials against local taxation
- 1723
  - São Francisco Church built.
  - Third Order of St. Dominic active.
- 1724 - Academia Brasílica dos Esquecidos founded.
- 1754 - Church of Nosso Senhor do Bonfim consecrated.
- 1759 -
  - Academia Brasílica dos Renascidos founded.
  - - December: Expulsion of the Jesuits from Bahia
- 1763 - Brazilian capital relocated from Salvador to Rio de Janeiro.
- 1765 - Basilica of the Immaculate Conception (church) consecrated.

== 19th century ==
- 1819 - Yellow fever outbreak.
- 1822 - 2 March: Siege of Salvador da Bahia begins.
- 1823 - 2 July: Siege of Salvador da Bahia ends.
- 1834 - Banco Econômico (bank) established.
- 1835
  - Malê revolt, a slave rebellion
  - Dois de Julho Society founded.
- 1836 - Campo Santo Cemetery established.
- 1857 - Revolution of the Ganhadores, a labor strike led by slaves and freedmen
- 1858 - Diário da Bahia, a newspaper, begins publication.
- 1860 - Bahia and San Francisco Railway begins operating.
- 1872 - Population: 129,109.
- 1873 - Elevador Lacerda begins operating.
- 1882 - Baptist congregation founded.
- 1890
  - Arquivo Público do Estado da Bahia established.
  - Population: 174,412.
- 1891 - Empório Industrial do Norte begins operating.
- 1894 - Instituto Geográfico e Histórico da Bahia founded.
- 1899 - Esporte Clube Vitória (football team) formed.
- 1900 - Population: 205,813.

== 20th century ==
- 1910 - Cine Teatro Jandaia opens.
- 1912 - A Tarde newspaper begins publication.
- 1916 - Avenida Sete de Setembro opens.
- 1918 - Bahia Museum of Art established.
- 1927 - American School established.
- 1930 - Associação Bahiana de Imprensa headquartered in city.
- 1931 - Esporte Clube Bahia, a football club, formed.
- 1933 - Old Cathedral of Salvador demolished.
- 1942 - Base Aérea de Salvador (air force base) established.
- 1950 - Population: 274,910 city; 389,422 metro.
- 1951 - Estádio Fonte Nova opens.
- 1958 - Castro Alves Theatre and Martim Gonçalves Theatre established.
- 1959 - Obras Sociais Irmã Dulce (charity) and Federal University of Bahia's Centro de Estudos Afro-Orientais founded.
- 1960 - Population: 393,207 city.
- 1961 - Catholic University of Salvador established.
- 1962 - Sister city relationship established with Los Angeles, USA.
- 1964 - Vila Velha Theater established.
- 1970 - Population: 998,258 city; 1,005,216 urban agglomeration.
- 1972 - Business School of Bahia established.
- 1973 - Pituaçu Metropolitan Park established.
- 1974
  - Avenida Luís Viana Filho inaugurated.
  - Ilê Aiyê musical group formed.
- 1975 - Iguatemi Salvador shopping center in business.
- 1979 - Olodum cultural organization founded.
- 1983 - 4 November: 1983 Copa América football tournament held.
- 1985 - Historic Center of Salvador designated a UNESCO World Heritage Site.
- 1987 - Shopping Barra in business.
- 1991 - Population: 2,072,058.
- 1993 - Population: 2,174,072 (estimate).
- 1995 - City joins the União das Cidades Capitais Luso-Afro-Américo-Asiáticas.
- 1997 - Salvador Metro construction begins.

== 21st century ==
- 2006 - Museu da Gastronomia Bahiana (food museum) opens.
- 2007
  - 25 November: Fonte Nova stadium collapses.
  - 22 May: Salvador Shopping, a mall, opens.
- 2008 - Espaco Unibanco de Cinema Glauber Rocha opens.
- 2010
  - Salvador Norte Shopping, a mall, opens.
  - Population: 2,675,656.
- 2012 - October: Salvador 2012 municipal election held.
- 2013
  - Itaipava Arena Fonte Nova opens.
  - ACM Neto becomes mayor.
- 2014 - Salvador Metro begins operation.
- 2016 - 2 October: Salvador 2016 municipal election held.

== See also ==
- History of Savador
- List of mayors of Salvador, Bahia
- History of Bahia
- List of national heritage sites of Bahia, including Salvador

== Bibliography ==
=== in English ===
- John Mawe (1812), "(Capitania of Bahia)", Travels in the Interior of Brazil, London: Longman, Hurst, Rees, Orme, and Brown
- Abraham Rees (1819), "Salvador", The Cyclopaedia, London: Longman, Hurst, Rees, Orme & Brown
- Charles Knight, ed. (1866). "Bahia". Geography. English Cyclopaedia. Vol. 1. London: Bradbury, Evans, & Co. hdl:2027/nyp.33433000064786.
- Michael George Mulhall; E.T. Mulhall (1877). "Bahia". Handbook of Brazil. Buenos Ayres. hdl:2027/mdp.39015014192523.
- Lamoureux, Andrew Jackson (1910). "Bahia (city)" . Encyclopædia Britannica. Vol. 3 (11th ed.). p. 210.
- Ernst B. Filsinger (1922), "Brazil: Bahia", Commercial Travelers' Guide to Latin America, Washington, DC: Government Printing Office
- A. J. R. Russell-Wood (1989). "Prestige, Power, and Piety in Colonial Brazil: The Third Orders of Salvador". Hispanic American Historical Review. 69 (1): 61–89. doi:10.1215/00182168-69.1.61. JSTOR 2516163.
- Dain Borges (1993). "Salvador's 1890s: Paternalism and Its Discontents". Luso-Brazilian Review. 30 (2): 47–57. JSTOR 3513953.
- Robert M. Levine (1993). "The Singular Brazilian City of Salvador". Luso-Brazilian Review. 30 (2): 59–69. JSTOR 3513954.
- Mieko Nishida (1993). "Manumission and Ethnicity in Urban Slavery: Salvador, Brazil, 1808-1888". Hispanic American Historical Review. 73 (3): 361–391. doi:10.2307/2517695. JSTOR 2517695.
- Trudy Ring and Robert M. Salkin, ed. (1995). "Salvador (Bahia, Brazil)". Americas. International Dictionary of Historic Places. Routledge. p. 586+. ISBN 978-1-134-25930-4.
- Hendrik Kraay (1999). "Between Brazil and Bahia: Celebrating Dois de Julho in Nineteenth-Century Salvador". Journal of Latin American Studies. 31 (2): 255–286. doi:10.1017/S0022216X99005283. JSTOR 157905. S2CID 145151506.
- David Marley (2005), "Salvador", Historic Cities of the Americas, vol. 1, Santa Barbara, California: ABC-CLIO, pp. 710+, ISBN 1-57607-027-1
- João José Reis [in Portuguese] (2013). "African Nations in Nineteenth-Century Salvador, Bahia". In Jorge Canizares-Esguerra; et al. (eds.). Black Urban Atlantic in the Age of the Slave Trade. University of Pennsylvania Press. ISBN 978-0-8122-0813-9.

=== in Portuguese ===
- J.C.R. Milliet de Saint-Adolphe (1863), "Bahia", Diccionario geographico, historico e descriptivo, do imperio do Brazil (in Portuguese), Paris: J. P. Aillaud, hdl:2027/wu.89006303085 – via HathiTrust
- Jorge Amado (1945). Bahia de Todos os Santos (in Portuguese).
