= Baroque in Brazil =

Dominant aesthetic in Brazil from the 17th century

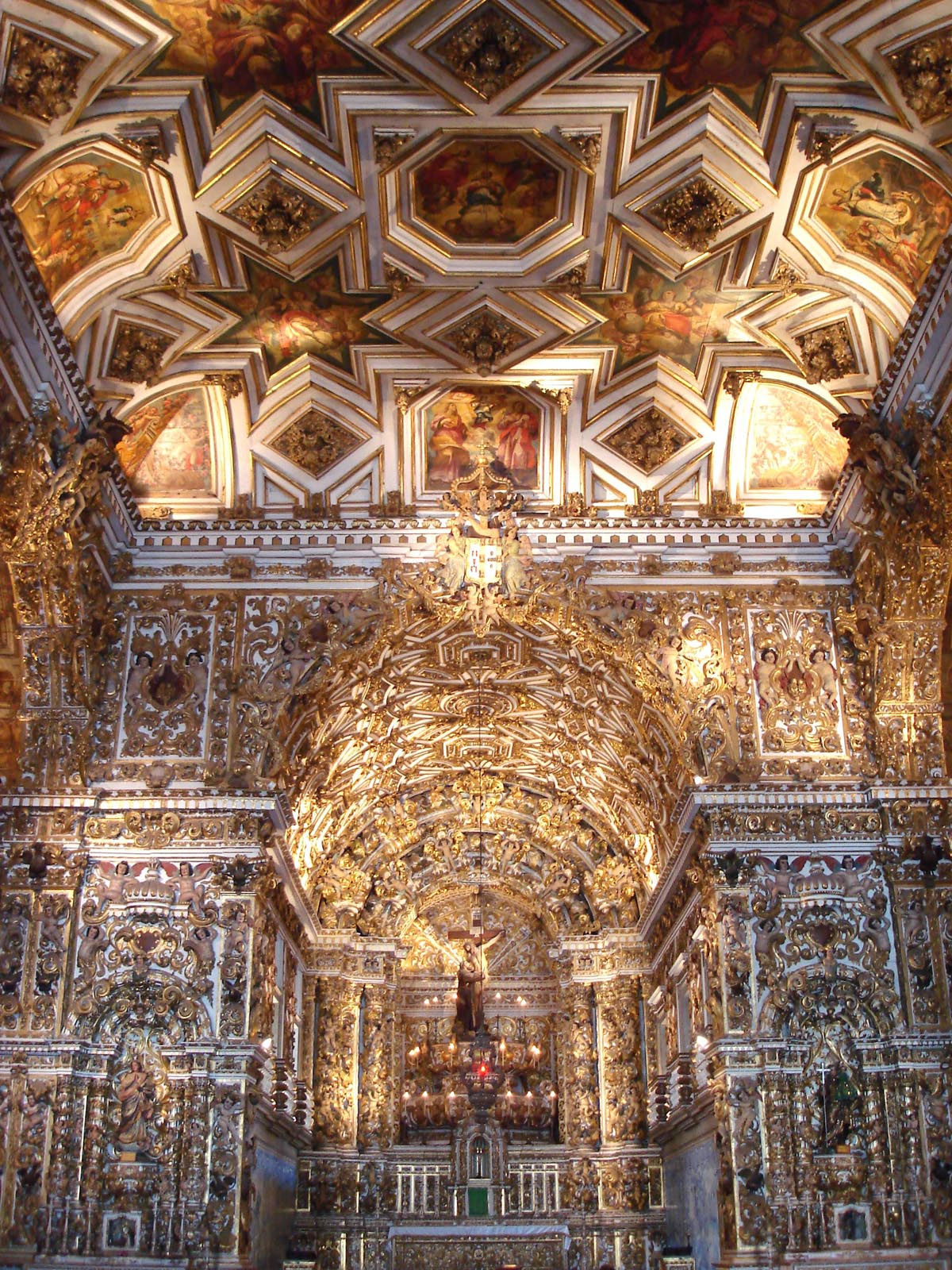
Church and Convent of São Francisco, Salvador

The Baroque in Brazil was the dominant artistic style during most of the colonial period, finding an open ground for a rich flowering. It made its appearance in the country at the beginning of the 17th century, introduced by Catholic missionaries, especially Jesuits, who went there in order to catechize and acculturate the native indigenous peoples and assist the Portuguese in the colonizing process. In the course of the Colonial period, expressed a close association between the Church and the State, but in the colony there was not a court that would serve as a patron of the arts, the elites did not bother to build palaces, or to help sponsor the profane arts, but at the end of the period, and how the religion had a strong influence on the daily lives of everyone in this group of factors derives from the vast majority of the legacy of the Brazilian Baroque period, is the sacred art: statuary, painting, and the work of carving for the decoration of churches and convents, or for private worship.

The most typical characteristics of the Baroque, usually described as a dynamic, narrative, ornamental, dramatic style, cultivating contrasts and a seductive plasticity, convey a programmatic content articulated with exquisite rhetoric and great pragmatism. Baroque art was an art in functional essence, paying very well for the purposes it was put to serve: in addition to its purely decorative function, it facilitated the absorption of Catholic doctrine and traditional customs by neophytes, being an efficient pedagogical and catechetic instrument.

In literature, Bento Teixeira's epic poem "Prosopopeia" (1601) is regarded as the initial landmark, reaching its zenith with the poet Gregório de Matos and the sacred orator Priest António Vieira. In the plastic arts its greatest exponents were Aleijadinho and Master Ataíde. In the field of architecture this school took root mainly in the Northeast and in Minas Gerais, but left large and numerous examples throughout almost the rest of the country, from Rio Grande do Sul to Pará. As for music, it is known from literary accounts that it was also prodigal, but, unlike the other arts, almost nothing was saved. With the development of Neoclassicism and Academism from the first decades of the 19th century, the Baroque tradition quickly fell into disuse in the elite culture. But it survived in popular culture, especially in interior regions, in the work of Santeiros and in some festivities.

In the beginning of the 20th century, a process of rescuing the national Baroque began. A large number of buildings and collections of art have already been protected by the government, through declarations of protected heritage, musealization, and other processes, attesting an official recognition of the importance Baroque holds in the history of Brazilian culture.

Baroque Historic Centers such as the cities of Ouro Preto, Olinda and Salvador, along with artistic ensembles such as the Sanctuary of the Bom Jesus de Matosinhos were granted the status of World Heritage Sites by the UNESCO seal.

This heritage is one of the attractions of cultural tourism in the country. It has become an identifier of Brazil, both for locals and for foreigners. Much of the material legacy of the Brazilian Baroque is in a poor state of conservation and require restoration or preventative care. There are often losses or degradation of valuable specimens in all artistic modalities, although National Museums are improving their techniques and procedures, and the government has invested frequently in this area.

== The European model in Brazil ==
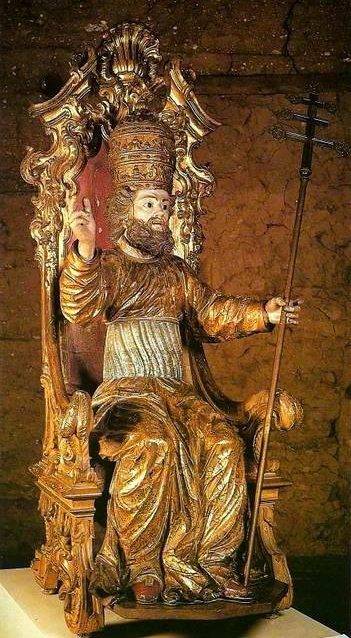
Pope St. Peter, from the most learned Portuguese school. Museum of Sacred Art of São Paulo

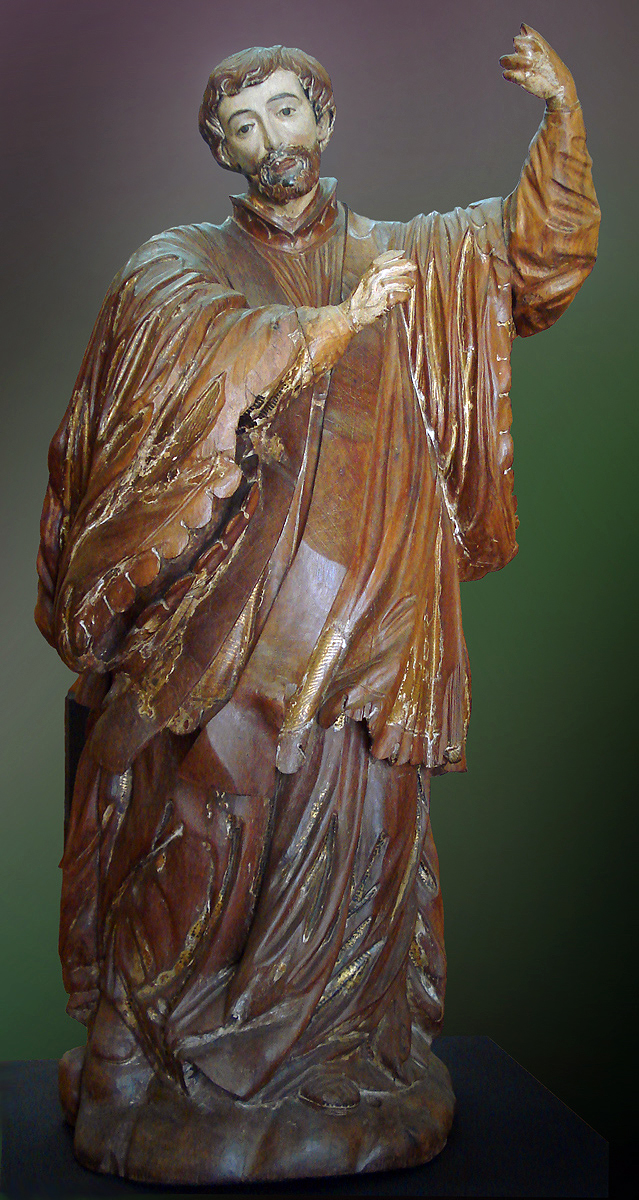
Art of the Jesuit Mission, of Spanish and Italian origin: São Francisco Xavier, Museu Júlio de Castilhos

The Baroque was born in Italy in the turn of the 16th to the 17th century, in the midst of one of the greatest spiritual crises Europe had ever faced: the Protestant Reformation, which split the continent's ancient religious unity and sparked an international political rearrangement in which the once almighty Catholic Church has lost strength and space. It was a style of reaction against Classicism of the Renaissance, whose foundations revolved around symmetry, proportionality, economics, rationality, and formal equilibrium. Thus, Baroque aesthetics prevailed by asymmetry, excess, expressive and irregular, so much so that the term "Baroque", which named the style, designated a bizarre and irregular shaped pearl. In addition to an aesthetic tendency, these traits constituted a true way of life and set the tone for the entire culture of the period, a culture that emphasized contrast, conflict, dynamic, dramatic, grandiloquent, dissolution of boundaries, along with an accentuated taste for the opulence of shapes and materials, making it a perfect vehicle for the Counter-Reformation Catholic Church and the rising absolutist monarchies to visibly express their ideals of glory and pomp. The monumental structures erected during the Baroque, such as the palaces and the great theaters and churches, sought to create a spectacular and exuberant nature impact, proposing an integration between the various artistic languages and trapping the viewer in a cathartic, apotheotic, engaging and passionate atmosphere. This aesthetic had wide acceptance in the Iberian Peninsula, especially in Portugal, whose culture, besides being essentially Catholic and monarchical, in which officially united Church and State and delimited loose and indistinct boundaries between public and private, was impregnated with millennialism and mysticism, favoring an ubiquitous and superstitious religiosity characterized by emotional intensity. And from Portugal the movement moved to its colony in South America, where the cultural context of the indigenous peoples, marked by ritualism and festivity, provided a receptive background.

The Baroque appeared in Brazil about one hundred years after the Portuguese colonization of Brazil. The population had grown beyond the first villages of the 16th century, and some local culture was taking root. The Portuguese, however, struggled to establish an essential economic infrastructure: they encountered a hostile climate and terrain, as well as resistance by indigenous peoples. Despite these conditions, the Portuguese heavily exploited the colony for crops and minerals. Slavery was a fundamental aspect of colonial Brazilian society, and was the basis of its workforce.

The Baroque in Brazil was born, therefore, in an environment of struggle and conquest. The colonizers were, at the same time, in awe of the magnificent landscape of the new colony, a feeling they held from the beginning. The Baroque flourished for several centuries in the new and immense country, its aesthetic and essence reflected in the contrast, drama, excess, and wonder, of daily life. It was perhaps able to mirror the continental magnitude of the colonizing enterprise, leaving a set of equally grandiose masterpieces in the Baroque style. More than merely an aesthetic movement, the Baroque was a cultural movement that penetrated all spheres and social strata. The Baroque, then, merges with, and shapes, a large portion of the Brazilian national identity and its concept of the past. According to Benedito Lima de Toledo, "a fundamental fact remains: for more than three centuries the Baroque has translated the aspirations and contradictions of Brazilian society, one that was eager to find its own path. It is art that expresses the yearnings of a nation in its long quest for self-affirmation." It is not by chance that Affonso Romano de Sant'Anna called the Baroque "the soul of Brazil". A significant part of this artistic heritage is now a UNESCO World Heritage Site, and a large number of Brazilian Baroque buildings are protected by the federal National Institute of Historic and Artistic Heritage (IPHAN) as well as state and municipal governments.

The Baroque in Brazil was formed by a complex web of European influences and local adaptations, generally colored by the Portuguese interpretation of the style. It is necessary to remember, however, that the context in which the Baroque developed in the colony was completely different from the one that gave rise to the movement in Europe.

That is why the Brazilian Baroque, despite all the gold in the national churches, has already been accused of a poverty of style and naivety when compared to the European Baroque, with its erudite, courtly, and sophisticated character. It was created by white European colonizers, and the production carried out in a rudimentary technique by artisans with little education. The artisans included enslaved people of African descent; freed people of mixed race; or pardos, and indigenous peoples. This hybrid, with its naive and uncultured features, is one of the elements that lends the Brazilian baroque its originality and distinctiveness. Lucio Costa observed that:

"It should be recognized from the outset that it is not always academically perfect works [...] that, in fact, have the greatest plastic value. Works with a popular taste, disfiguring in their own way the modular relationships of erudite standards, often create new and unforeseen plastic relations, full of spontaneity and a spirit of invention, which eventually places them in an artistically superior plane to that of well-behaved works, within the rules of style and good taste, but empty of creative juices and real meaning real."

Communication between the first population centers on the coast in Brazil was not easy, it was often more practical to go directly to Lisbon for all matters. Naturally, until the 17th century, Brazilian artistic works were often carried out in precarious conditions where improvisation and amateurism prevailed, and much without the knowledge of what was happening in other parts of the colony. This gave rise to idiosyncratic interpretations of the Baroque.Frequent contact with the metropolis, or Lisbon, enabled colonial art to have access to an uninterrupted source of new information, though this did not prevent local variations and interpretations. There were many erudite masters in their fields, who became heads of schools, initially Portuguese and later many Brazilians as well; the richest and most sophisticated examples of Baroque production are attributed to them. The religious figures active in Brazil came from different countries, and many of them were literati, architects, painters, and sculptors. They were, in general, well-educated and talented, and contributed decisively to the complex cultural situation in Brazil, bringing a variety of training. They were trained in countries such as Spain, Italy, and France, in addition to Portugal itself, and served as disseminators of European artistic currents. Contact with Asia via maritime trading companies also left its mark, with some Asian influence found in paintings, lacquers, porcelain, and ivory figurines. At the beginning of the 18th century, with better internal communication and working conditions, European theoretical treatises and practical manuals on art began to circulate in the studios of Brazil. Local artists avidly sought reproductions in engraving of European works, ancient and current, which presented them with a heterogeneous iconography to use as a formal model and adapt on a large scale in works across Brazil. The penetration of French influence can be observed from 1760 onwards in Brazil. It gave rise to another, more elegant, varied, and light movement, the so-called Rococo, which flourished most expressively in the churches of Minas Gerais. Even elements of already-obsolete styles such as Gothic and Renaissance were found in this environment of varying influences. It is as a result of these interwoven influences the original, eclectic, and sometimes contradictory Brazilian Baroque was born, which today can be seen across practically the entire coast of the country and in a large part of its interior. The Amazon region was the least affected, as it was the last to be populated. The south of Brazil, conquered from the mid-18th century onwards, also has relatively little Baroque heritage.

The Baroque was integrated in the Brazilian national context by the end of the 18th century, having produced innumerable works of high value. Two famous figures appeared at the culmination of the Baroque in Brazil, both in the cultural and economic center of Minas Gerais: Aleijadinho (Antônio Francisco Lisboa) in architecture and sculpture, and Master Ataíde (Manoel da Costa Ataíde) in painting. They epitomized an art movement that had managed to mature and adapt to the environment of a tropical country still dependent on Portugal, linking itself to regional resources and values, and constituting one of the first great moments of native originality, of genuine Brazilianness. The so-called Mineiro Baroque, or Baroque of Minas Gerais, represented by Aleijadinho and Master Ataíde, for many scholars is no longer Baroque but Rococo; this reflects the controversies that still exist regarding the identification of the Rococo as an independent style. The recent trend is to give autonomy to Rococo as a movement. But, until the mid-19th century, overlapping influences archaisms persisted, making characterization often impossible in the analysis of individual cases.

The great artistic cycle from which Aleijadinho and Master Ataíde emerged was abruptly interrupted with the official imposition of the neoclassical. It began with the arrival of the Portuguese court to Brazil in 1808 and the activity of the French Artistic Mission (Missão Artística Frances). From then on, losing official and elite favor, the Baroque gradually dissolved. But it is proof of the vigor of the Baroque in that its echoes were heard across Brazil, especially in provincial centers, and practiced by popular artisans until contemporary times. In fact, several writers have stated that the Baroque never died and is still very much alive in the national culture of Brazil, being constantly reinvented and reinvented.

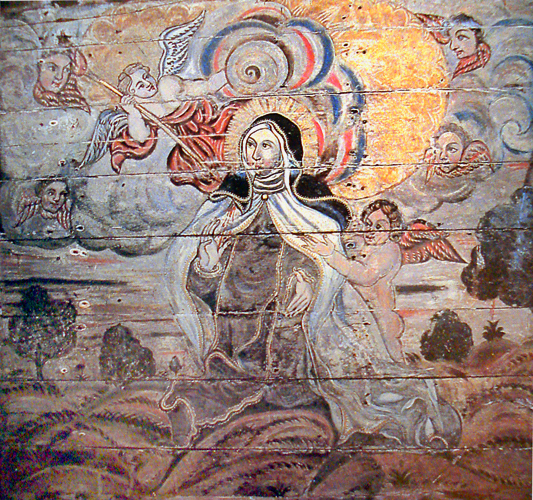
Anonymous. Êxtase de Santa Teresa, Igreja do Convento do Carmo, São Cristóvão.

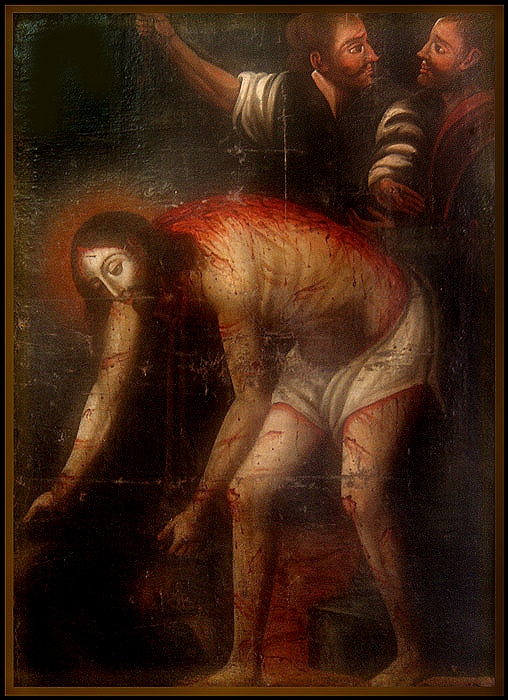
Cristo açoitado, today in the Museu de Arte Sacra de Pernambuco

== The role of the Catholic Church ==
The Catholic Church was, alongside the royal courts, the greatest patron of art in Europe in this period. There was no court in the immense colony of Brazil, and local administration was confusing and inefficient. A vast societal space remained vacant for the Church and its missionary entrepreneurs, among them the Jesuits. They administered, in addition to the divine offices, a series of civil services such as birth and death registrations. They were at the forefront of the conquest of the interior of the territory, and organized a good part of the urban space on the coast; they additionally led in teaching and social assistance; and maintaining schools, orphanages, hospitals, and asylums. The Jesuits and other brotherhoods built large religious structures decorated with luxury, commissioned musical pieces for worship, and immensely stimulated the cultural environment as a whole. They dictated rules in terms of themes and in the representation of Christian figures; the Church thus centralized Brazilian colonial art, with rare examples conspicuous profane expression. In Brazil, therefore, almost all Baroque art is sacred art. This is seen in the profusion of churches in the colony and the scarcity of Baroque palaces and other civil structures. Catholic churches were not just a place of worship, but the most important space for people to fraternize, a center for the transmission of basic social values, and often the only safe place in the turbulent and violent life of the population. There was a shift towards secularization in the arts, but not during the Baroque period in Brazil. Lay institutions increased in influence in the 18th century due to the multiplication of demands and administrative bodies in the developing colony, but they did not come to constitute a large market for artists. A civil administration was formed with the help of the Portuguese cooperation in 1808, which fundamentally transformed the governing infrastructure of Brazil.

As well as the other parts of the world where it flourished, the Brazil Baroque was a style moved largely by religious inspiration. At the same time is had an enormous emphasis on the senses and the richness of material and form, in a tacit and ambiguous agreement between spiritual glory and sensual pleasure. This agreement, when conditions allowed, created some works of art of enormous richness and formal complexity. Just entering one of the main temples of the Brazilian Baroque period is enough for the eyes to be immediately lost in an explosion of shapes and colors. Images of the saints were framed in radiant splendor, with caryatids, angels, garlands, columns and carvings in such a volume that in some cases they do not leave a square foot of space in view without decorative intervention. Walls and alters were completely covered with gold. The art historian Germain Bazin said "for the people of this period, all was a spectacle."

In the perspective of the time, this decorative profusion was justified: religious figures educated the population towards the appreciation of abstract virtues, seeking to seduce them first through the corporeal senses, especially through the beauty of form. Such wealth was also considered a tribute due to God, for his own glory. Despite the Protestant denunciation of the excessive luxury of Catholic art and architecture, and the Council of Trent's recommendation of austerity, in practice Catholics ignored the restrictions. In fact, the Council itself essentially convened to plan the fight against the advance of Protestantism. It orchestrated, mainly through the Jesuits, an aggressive proselytizing campaign via the arts, making Catholicism more attractive to popular taste by satisfying the need of lay people through its comprehensibility, touching on basic passions, hopes, and fears. It also added a systematic doctrinal character, introducing new themes, new modes of representation, and a whole new style. These factors created a cultural project that, in addition to pedagogical refinements, was a watershed in the various arts and promoted the emergence of a cornucopia of masterpieces. It provided the audience with an immersive environment in which they would receive a massive bombardment of varied sensory, intellectual, and emotional stimuli. Among the works of art were sacred narratives painted on canvas, grandiose and poignant music, the flickering of the candles placing mystical reflections from the gold in the rich carvings, and the pious staging of sacred mysteries. It included "miraculous" statues promising happiness to the believers and intimidating the sinners, a smell of incense creating a suggestive atmosphere, a chorus of litanies, festive processions with fireworks and the sumptuous ceremonies, and rhetorical sermons. In total, it can be seen that art "can seduce the soul, disturb it and enchant it in depths not perceived by reason; let this be done for the benefit of faith."

Unlike Europe of the period, the threat of Protestantism did not exist in colonial Brazil. The majority of its population, however, were non-Christians: indigenous Brazilians and enslaved people of African origin. The model of the Baroque, therefore, remained valid: it utilized seductive and didactic art that attempted to attract and convert non-Christian populations, as well as uneducated Portuguese colonists and their children. Baroque art and architecture served as a means of education for everyone, imposing on them beliefs, traditions, and models of virtue and conduct. It also aimed to strengthen the faith of Catholic believers, and encourage a deepening of their faith. There were insurmountable chasms between the social classes in colonial Brazilian society, where slavery prevailed. Indigenous and enslaved people, in practice and with rare exception, were not even considered human beings. They were mere private property in the view of Portuguese colonialists, an instrument of exploitation and a source of profit. A unified Catholic religion served as a way of cushioning serious inequalities and tensions. It additionally enabled the colonizing power to control all elements of society, and even justify slavery and exploitation, in the perspective of the formal union between Church and State. The Church contributed much to the colonial cause with its doctrine and art to maintain the social and political status quo. Alfredo Bosi explained:

In the bowels of the colonial condition, a rhetoric was conceived for the masses that could only assume in great allegorical schemes the doctrinal contents that the acculturating agent had proposed to instill. Allegory exerts a singular power of persuasion, often terrible for the simplicity of its images and the uniformity of the collective reading. Hence its use as an acculturation tool, hence its presence from the first hour of our spiritual life, planted in the Counter-Reformation that joined the ends of the Medieval period and the beginning of the Baroque.

In addition to the beauty of the forms and the richness of the materials, the Catholic Church emphatically made use of the emotional aspect of the Baroque movement. Love, devotion, and compassion visually represented the most dramatic moments in Church history. Images abound of the scourged Christ, the Virgin Mary with a heart pierced with knives, the bloody crucifixes. The roca processional images, which are real articulated puppets, were made of real human hair, teeth, and clothing. They were carried in solemn processions where wailing and physical mortifications were common among those along the procession routes, and sins were confessed aloud. Religious festivities were, in fact, more than a form of pious expression. They were also the most important moments of collective socialization in colonial life, often extending into the private sphere. The intensity of these events was recorded in many accounts of the time, such as that of Father Antônio Gonçalves, who participated in a Holy Week procession in Porto Seguro:

"I have never seen so many tears of passion as I have seen in this one, because from the beginning to the end, there was continuous screaming and there was no one who could hear what the priest was saying. And this happened with men as well as with women, and [referring to self-flagellation] about five or six people were left almost dead, who for a long time did not come to their senses.... And there were people who said they wanted to get involved, in part where they didn't see people and did all their life penance for their sins."

This was not an isolated example. On the contrary, the Baroque Catholic mentality was especially prone to exaggeration and drama. A strong belief in miracles and devotion to relics and saints was a general practice. These were often mixed with superstitions and practices viewed as unorthodox to the Catholic church. Many such practices were learned from indigenous peoples and enslaved Africans, elements of the population that presented great difficulty to the clergy. A fear that the faithful would deviate into witchcraft was pervasive; the reports of the visitors of the Inquisition said it was happening everywhere, even among the ignorant members of the clergy. Luiz Mott stated, "despite the concern of the Inquisition and Royal legislation itself prohibiting the practice of sorcery and superstition, in colonial Brazil, in every street, village, rural neighborhood or parish, there were the rezadeiras (women who offered prayers), faith healers, and diviners providing much valued services in their vicinity". But that same mystical and passionate devotion, which so often adored the tragic and the bizarre and came dangerously close to heresy and irreverence, also shaped countless scenes of ecstasy and celestial visions, Madonnas of naive and youthful grace and perennial charm, and images of Jesus as an infant who appealed to the simple hearts of the people was immediate and supremely effective. Bazin captured the essence of the process:

"Religion was the great principle of unity in Brazil. It imposed on the different races mixed here, each one emerging from a different psychic universe, a world of basic mental representations. They were easily superimposed on the pagan world, and in the case of indigenous and Afro-Brazilians through hagiography, so suitable to open the way to Christianity for those coming from polytheism".

== Architecture ==
=== Church Buildings ===
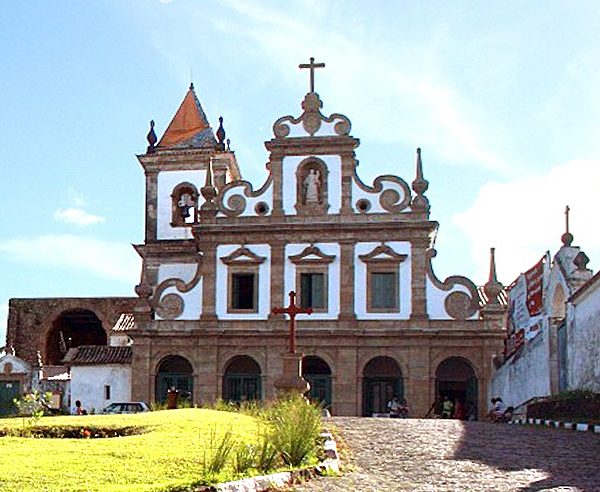
Convent and Church of Saint Anthony, Cairu

The first sacred buildings of any importance in Brazil were erected in the second half of the 16th century. Their construction was justified with the development of some populated settlement, as in the cases of Olinda and Salvador. The simplest ones used the wattle and daub technique and covered by palm fronds. Catholic missionaries were concerned with the durability and solidity of the buildings from the beginning. The preferred, whenever possible, to build in stone masonry, but were often forced to use rammed earth or adobe.

The plans sought, above all, functionality. They were typically composed of a quadrilateral plan without division into naves and without side chapels. They had a simple facade with a triangular pediment implanted on a rectangular base. There was a great preoccupation with ornaments in this early period. This style, a derivation of Mannerism, whose austerity referred to classical buildings, was known by the name of "plain architecture". The friar and architect Francisco Dias arrived in Salvador in 1577 with the declared mission of introducing technical improvements and aesthetic refinement in the churches of the colony. He was influenced by Giacomo Vignola, whose style had become popular with the Portuguese court. Vignola was also the author of the first baroque church building in Europe, the Church of the Gesù in Rome, which immediately became a model for many other Jesuit churches around the world. The model was adapted in Brazil maintaining the single nave scheme, but dispensing with the dome and transept. Towers were a favored element of church builders.

Jesuit buildings, concentrated in the Northeast, remained the traditional contours of great simplicity until the mid-17th century; this in turn influenced other religious orders in Brazil. Luxurious elements were reserved to interior areas, and included carved altars, paintings, and statuary. If the Jesuits were quite faithful to the original Italian model, the Franciscans allowed themselves to introduce variations in the facades. They were preceded by a porch or include a galilee, with the bell tower recessed from the front. The Franciscan chancel tended to be less deep than those found in the Jesuit model, and the absence of side aisles. They were replaced by two narrow, longitudinal ambulatories. The Convent and Church of Saint Anthony, Cairu followed the model, and is an early example of a church structure with clear baroque features. Its designer, Friar Daniel de São Francisco, created the façade in a staggered triangle scheme, with fanciful volutes on the pediment and sides. It was a complete novelty, unparalleled even in Europe.

Many Catholic church buildings were destroyed during Dutch occupation of northeast Brazil from 1630 to 1654; the colonia administrative center of Salvador was largely ruined, and occupied areas ranged from the present-day states of Sergipe to Maranhão. The Dutch were expelled from the mid-17th century, and resulted in a large-scale effort to restore pre-existing structures and build new ones. The baroque was the dominant style in this period, and led to architectural design of a similar type: the influence of Borromini, which led to more movement in façades via the addition of arched openings, railings, reliefs, and oculi. Interior the decoration also gained richness, but the schemes were somewhat static, and was conventionally called the "Portuguese national style".

Over time, the facades acquired more verticality and movement, with openings in unusual shapes—pear, diamond, star, oval, or circle; the pediments, more curved; and reliefs in stone and statuary. Examples includes the Parish Church of Saint Antony and the Concathedral of Saint Peter of the Clergymen, in Recife, and in Salvador, at the Church of the Third Order of Our Lady of the Rosary of the Black People in Salvador. A somewhat different phenomenon occurred in the Southern Reductions (Misiones Orientales), which in this period was territory that still belonged to Spain. Buildings in the Southern Reductions displayed a more monumental character than in the Northeast, with a greater variety of structural solutions. Elaborate porticos, colonnades, and frontispieces were all used. An urban program was developed for the forcible settlement of indigenous people in the Reductions. Today in ruins, part of this core of southern civil and religious architecture has been declared a UNESCO World Heritage Site.

Building exteriors began to lighten in proportions from the mid-18th century onwards. Under the influence of the French rococo, they became more elegant, with wider openings. This allowed for a greater penetration of external light. Stone relief was also used on a higher level. Rococo also bore important fruit in the northeast of Brazil. The Convent and Church of Saint Francis in João Pessoa was considered by Germain Bazin to be the most perfect of its kind in the region. If the façade and interior decorations became increasingly sumptuous and busy, the building plans did not deviate from a determined floor plan throughout the entire trajectory of the Baroque in Brazil. John Bury stated:

"Even in the 18th century, when façades, domes, towers, altarpieces, pulpits, and the internal ornamentation of churches in general were completely freed from all the previous limitations of static and rectilinear layouts, and the façades of Baroque and Rococo churches developed dynamism and a predilection for curved and sinuous forms almost unparalleled in Europe; yet the floor plans of these churches remained monotonously faithful to the severe rectangular layouts of the 16th and 17th centuries".

Projects of poorer communities, in parish churches and small chapels that dot the arid interior of the Brazilian sertão, contributed to the diversity of the style and the simplication of proportions, ornaments, techniques, and materials, often in creative solutions, of great plasticity. In parallel with the construction of churches, the Catholic Church built convents, monasteries, colleges, and hospitals, some of them of considerable dimensions. The convents and monasteries, in some cases, were decorated with luxury comparable to that found in the richest churches. The colleges, hospitals, and other facilities were simple and functional, stripped of ornaments.

=== Civil architecture ===
The Baroque left relatively few buildings in civil architecture, private or public, of great importance. In comparison to religious architecture, they were quite modest. On the other hand, the historic centers of Brazilian some cities (Salvador, Ouro Preto, Olinda, Diamantina, São Luís, and Goiás) have been declared UNESCO World Heritage Sites. The city center remain largely intact, presenting an extensive and invaluable uninterrupted landscape of civil architecture of the baroque. The demonstration urban design solutions that were often original, with abundant illustration of adaptations of the style to different social strata in Brazil and their transformations over the years. Smaller cities preserve significant clusters of colonial houses, such as Paraty, Penedo, Marechal Deodoro, Cananéia, and Rio Pardo.

Residences during the Baroque period were characterized by a great heterogeneity of structural solutions and use of materials. They often employed techniques learned from the indigenous communities. A common house inherited from Portuguese design was a one-story structure, with a façade opening directly onto the street and similar to the neighboring houses, with rooms in a row. They were often poorly ventilated and poorly lit. This simple design was expanded in two- or even four-story sobrados, or townhouses. Distinctive features of the Baroque can be more easily identified in some details of larger residences, such as the curved roofs with eaves ending in upturned ends, arches lowered in the lintels, and frames and ornamental shutters on the windows. Decorative painting and tiles were utilized, but colonial residence were austere structures, sparsely furnished and decorated. Residences in rural areas were less confined by urban design and show more diversity in design.

== See also ==
- Culture of Brazil
- Mannerism in Brazil
- José Joaquim da Rocha
