= Parish Church of Our Lady of Pilar =

Church and cemetery in Salvador, Brazil

- Igreja Matriz de Nossa Senhora do Pilar
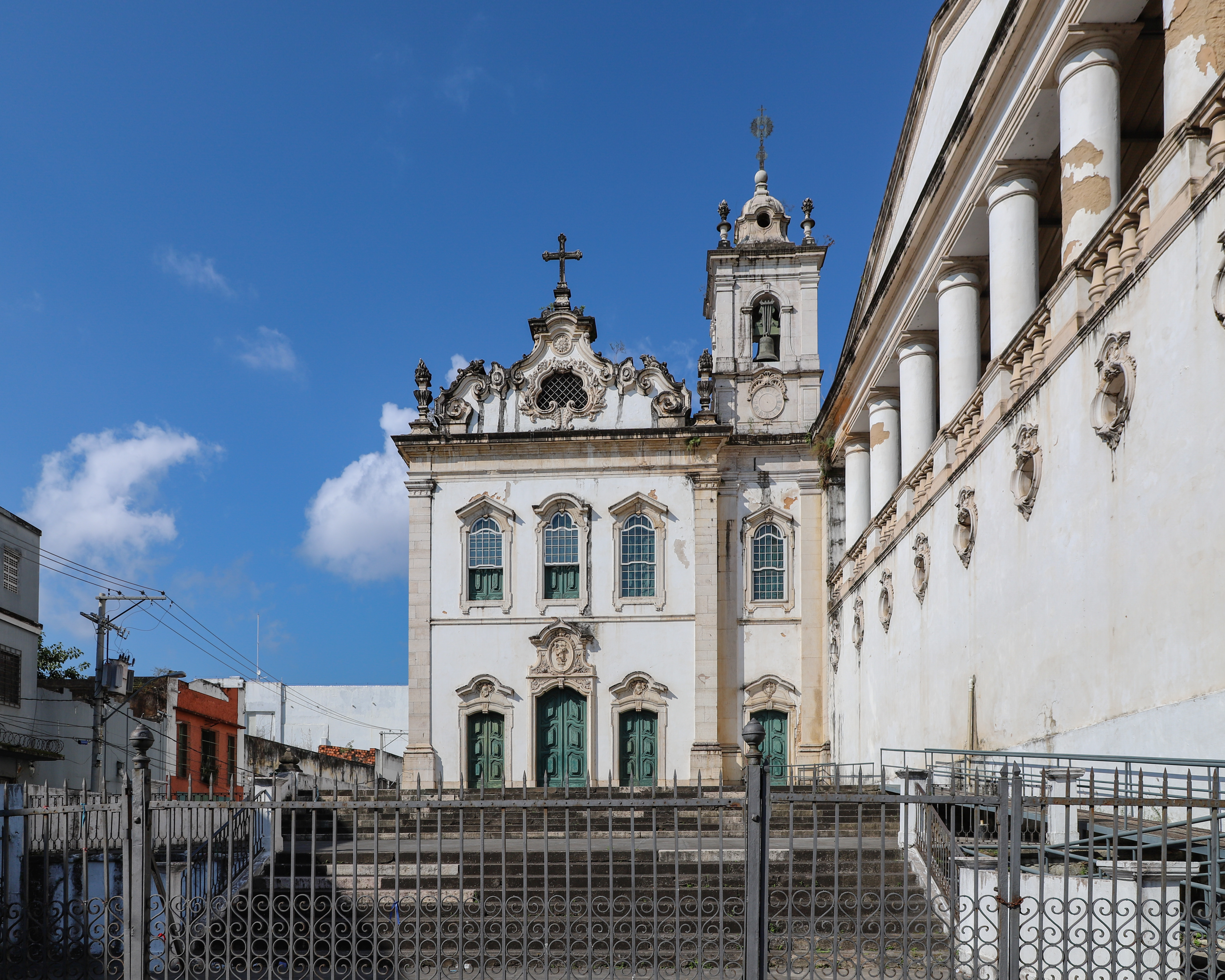
- Parish Church of Our Lady of Pilar, Salvador, Bahia, with view of cemetery at left

- Location of the Parish Church of Our Lady of Pilar in Brazil

Religion
- Affiliation: Catholic
- Diocese: Pilar
- Rite: Roman
- Ownership: Roman Catholic Archdiocese of São Salvador da Bahia

Location
- Municipality: Salvador
- State: Bahia
- Country: Brazil
- Interactive map of Parish Church of Our Lady of Pilar
- Coordinates: 12.966011°S 38.506717°W

Architecture
- Style: Baroque
- Established: 1700s
- Direction of façade: South-west

National Historic Heritage of Brazil
- Designated: 1938
- Reference no.: 122

The Parish Church of Our Lady of Pilar (Portuguese: Igreja Matriz de Nossa Senhora do Pilar) is an 18th-century Roman Catholic church located in Salvador, Bahia, Brazil. It includes a cemetery, constructed in the Neoclassical parallel to the nave of the church. The interior of the church has an extensive set of azulejo tiles in the rococo style. The historian Carlos Ott dated them to the late 18th century, and stated that they appear to be the work of the Juncal workshop in Portugal. The stonework of the church is in lioz stone, imported from Lisbon at great expense. The art historian Germain Bazin describes the church as a "refinement of forms", due to its long, narrow nave and lack of corridors in the nave.

The church closed in 1994 after heavy rains caused the collapse of a wall of the church; additionally, the cemetery was used by residents for waste disposal. A restoration project began in 2011, which included the removal of 2,500 tons of garbage from the cemetery. The Parish Church of Our Lady of Pilar reopened in 2015.

== Location ==
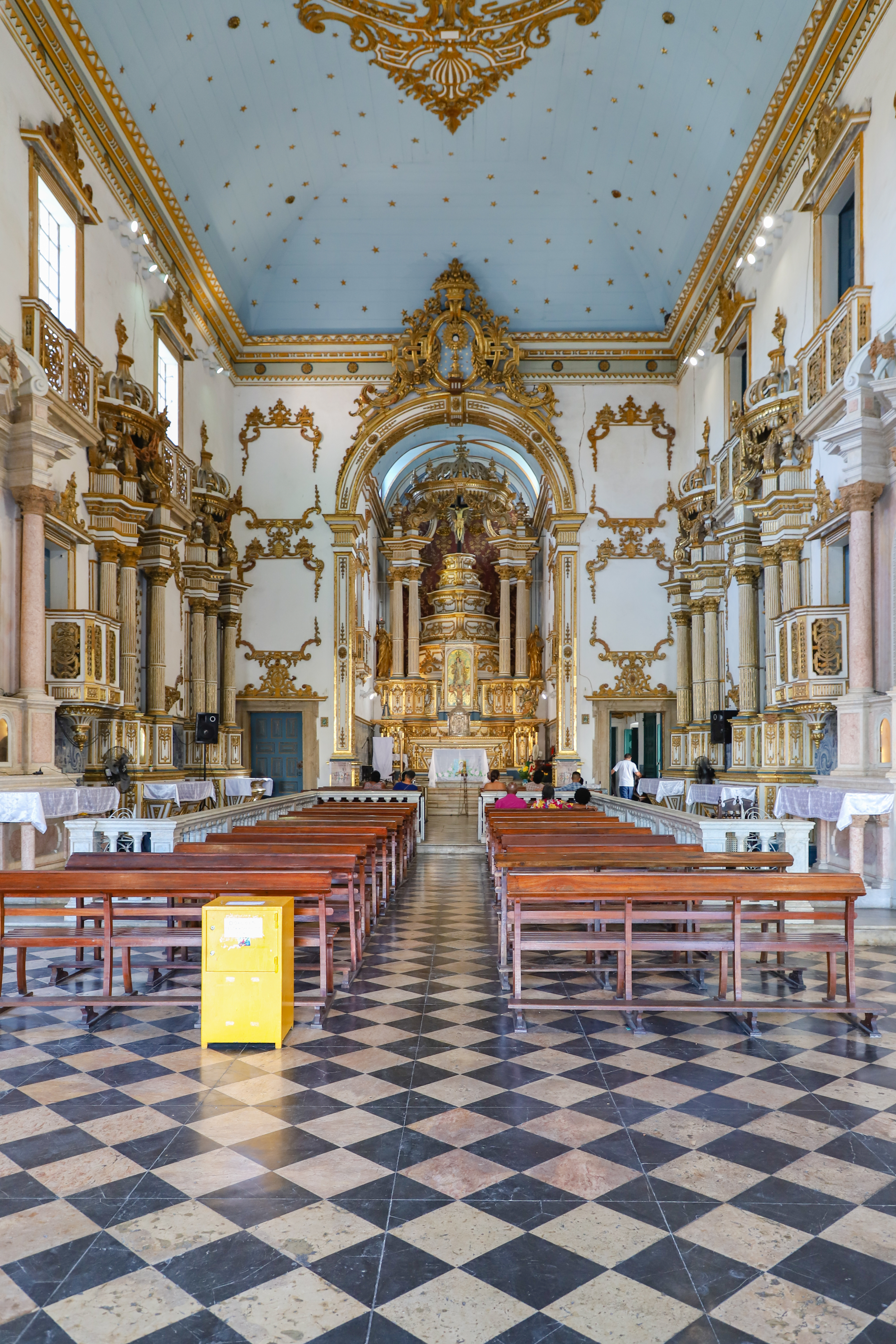
View of nave and chancel.

The Parish Church of Our Lady of Pilar is located in the Comércio district, in the historic lower city (cidade baixa) of Salvador. It was constructed at the base of a large slope below the Carmo district of the higher city. Its location at the base of the slope, which is largely unstabilized, has continually put the church at risk of damage caused by landslides.

== History ==
The Brotherhood of Our Lady of Pilar (Irmandade do Pilar) was established in Salvador in 1718. Construction of its church began in 1756 on an undeveloped slope of land beyond the lower city, or cidade baixa, or Salvador. The cemetery was completed in 1799 on a higher level of terrain than the church building in the Neoclassical style. The church, its internal patio with a fountain, and cemetery at a higher level formed an architectural complex unique to the city of Salvador.

Salvador was geographically divided into ten parishes, or freguesias, in the 19th century, uniting the functions of the state and church. The Parish Church of Our Lady of Pilar became the focal point of the freguesia of Santíssimo Sacramento do Pilar; residents were baptized, married, elected local officials, and were buried at the church. Pilar, as one of the commercial areas of the lower city, was home to both wealthy Portuguese merchants and enslaved and freed Afro-Brazilians; the latter worked in domestic labor, as fisherman, and as street vendors.

A fire occurred in December 1829 that damaged the dressing room (camirim) of the chancel and a tribune of the church. It also damaged many sculptures of saints, including the Lord of the Good Way (Senhor do Bom Caminho) and the statue of Our Lady of Pilar, the patron saint of the church. The fire also damage or completely melted sacred treasures of the church, including lamps, silver candlesticks, and the tabernacle. These were the work of Joaquim Alberto da Conceição e Matos. A landslide off the slope occurred on July 9, 1843. The consistory of the church was built above the cemetery, and was carried away in the landslide killing Father João Nepomuceno Moreira de Pinho, resident of the consistory.

== Structure ==
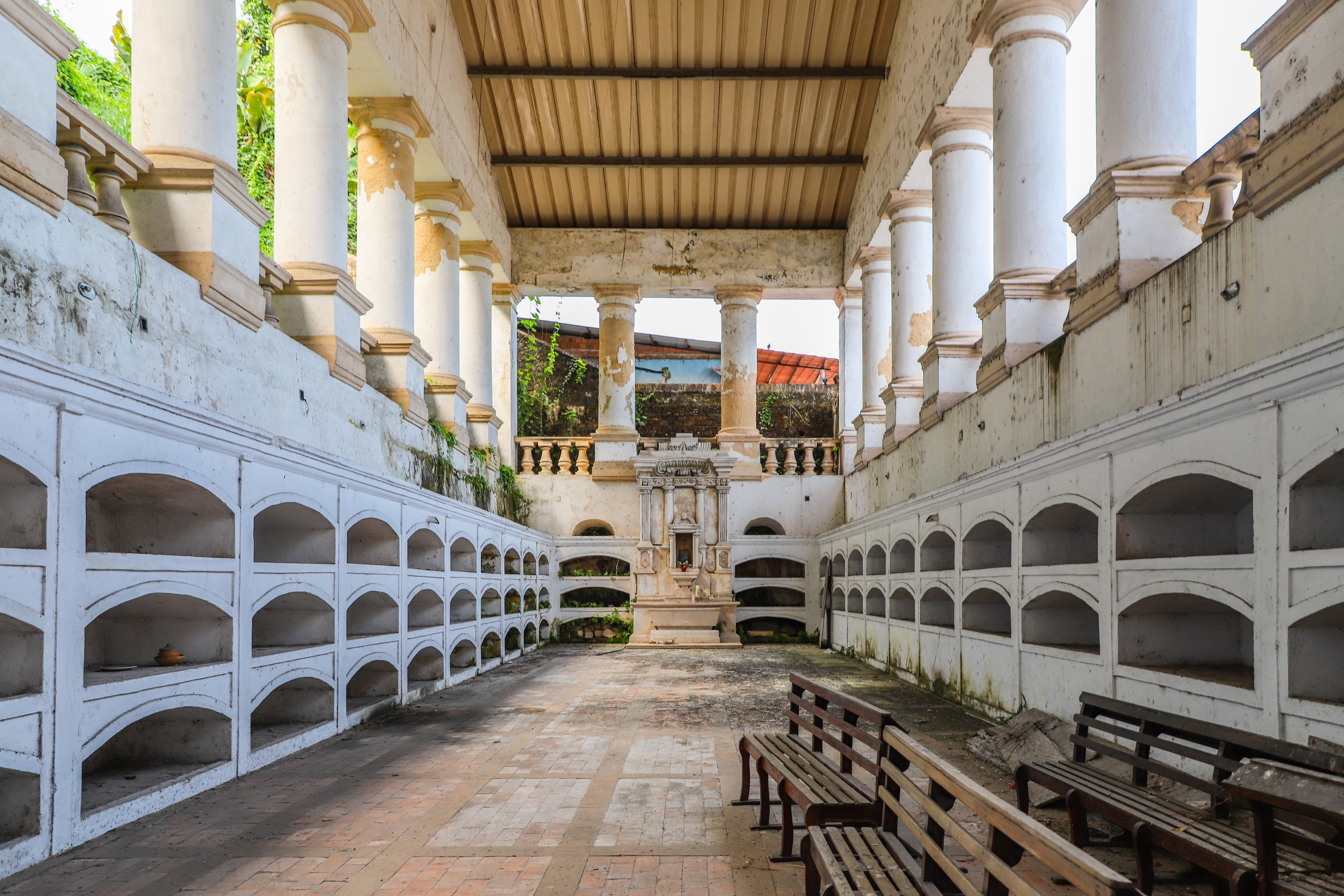
View of cemetery.

The façade of Parish Church of Our Lady of Pilar, other than its monumental pediment, doors, and windows, are in lioz limestone imported from Lisbon. The monument pediment in the Rococo style was added later. The church interior consists of a nave, altar, sacristy, tribunes that open to the inner courtyard rather than the interior, a former sacristy, and other smaller rooms. The art historian Germain Bazin describes the church structure as a "rare" design in Bahia: it lacks corridors with the nave, has only two narrow corridors that lead to the sacristy, and results in a "refinement of forms"; church design of this kind in the previous century is found first in Braga in Portugal and then in Minas Gerais in Brazil.

The painting on the ceiling of the nave is the work of José Teófilo de Jesus, completed in 1837. The master woodcarver Joaquim Francisco de Matos completed talha work on four altars of the nave, six tribunes, two pulpits, the carvings of the choir, and carvings of the baptismal font. The works were contracted in 1838 and completed in the following year; they were ultimately gilded in 1848.

The church is home to numerous works of art, including statues, painting, and metalwork. The statue of the Lord of the Good Way (Senhor do Bom Caminho) is the work of Manuel Inácio da Costa.

=== Sacristy ===
The sacristy of the Parish Church of Our Lady of Pilar is richly furnished and decorated. A large sacristy cabinet spans the length of the north wall of the room. Six richly painted panels are above the cabinet; they are the work of José Joaquim da Rocha (1737-1807) and completed in 1796. An ornate stone lavabo is on the south wall. The sacristy has azulejo tiles similar to those of the nave and halls.

== Fountain ==
A fountain dedicated to Saint Lucia is located in the interior churchyard at the base of the slope. The fountain is believed to have healing powers, especially for ocular problems. An annual festival dedicated to Saint Lucia takes place in September, and includes a Mass followed by a procession of the image of Saint Lucia throughout the Comercio district.

== Cemetery ==
The Parish Church of Our Lady of Pilar was the first Catholic church in Salvador to build an annexed cemetery. The large Neoclassical structure, designed by José de Anchieta Mesquita, was constructed in 1799. An exterior cemetery was an innovation of the period; burials within the church proper caused both sanitary problems and the spread of infectious diseases to parishioners. Other churches in Salvador followed the practice of the construction of an external cemetery in the 19th century.

Residents on the slope between the church and the upper Carmo district used the cemetery for waste disposal as early as the 19th century. The quantity of garbage caused the collapse of interior walls of the cemetery and cut off access to graves by the 20th century. The restoration project of 2011 saw the removal of 2,500 tons of garbage from the cemetery and restored access to the tombs and interior altar.

== Protected status ==
The Parish Church of Our Lady of Pilar was listed as a historic structure by the National Institute of Historic and Artistic Heritage in 1938. The church is part of the Historic Center of Salvador UNESCO World Heritage Site.

== Access ==
The Parish Church of Our Lady of Pilar is open to the public and may be visited.
