= José Joaquim da Rocha =

Brazilian painter

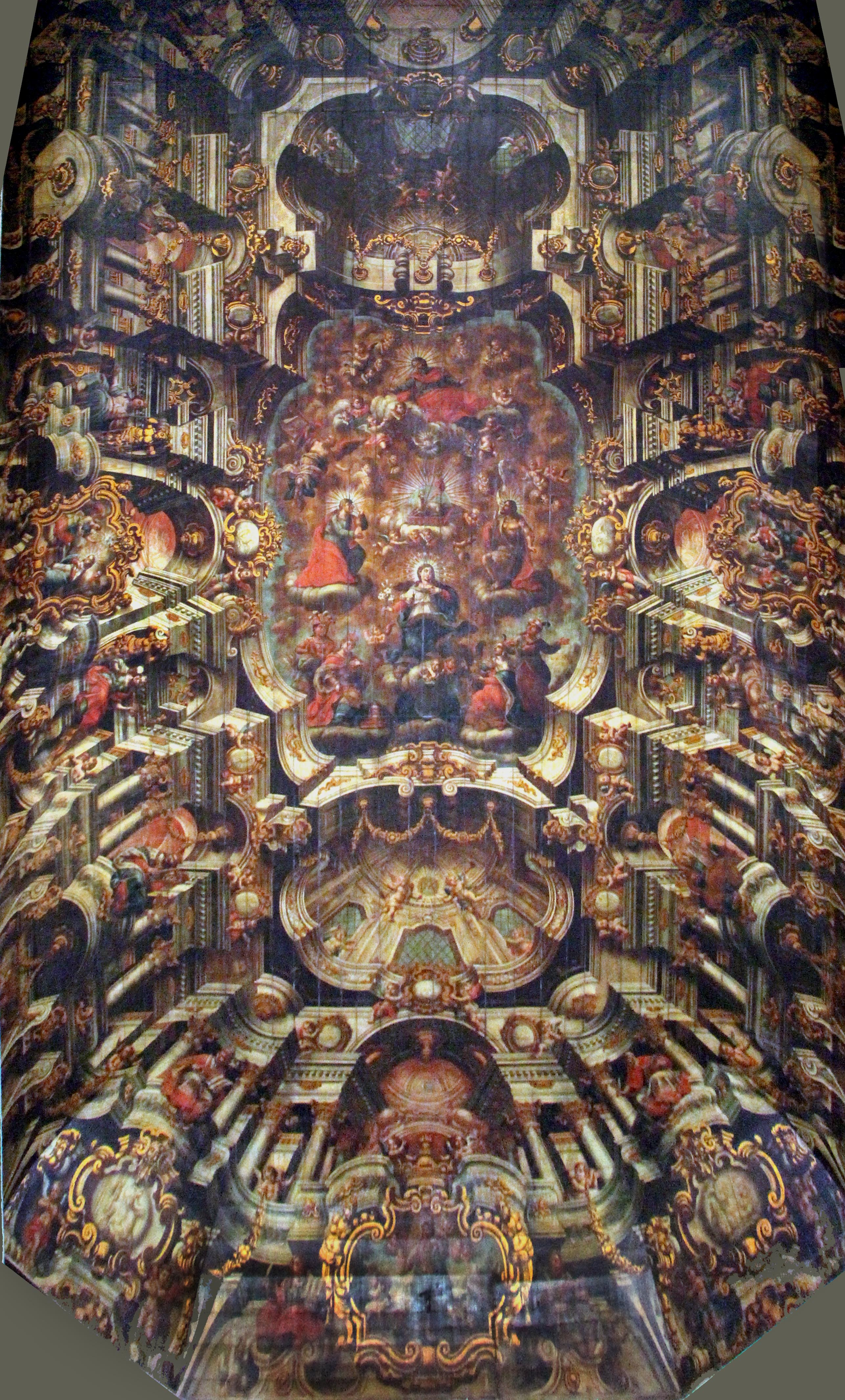
The ceiling of the Basilica of the Immaculate Conception, in Salvador, his most famous work

José Joaquim da Rocha (c. 1737 – October 12, 1807) was a Brazilian painter, engraver, gilder and restorer. His entire production was in the field of religious art, with the Catholic Church as his exclusive patron. He left numerous works of a scholarly character, moving away from the popular tradition that was common during the colonial period. Although his work has many moments of high level, it is uneven, partly because, since he became recognized, he always had many disciples and apprentices to assist him, to whom he delivered large portions of the work, and partly because of the use, as inspiration, of a varied iconography in engraving of irregular quality. Both practices were, however, common at the time.

He painted many easel pieces, but his most famous compositions are the great ceilings of churches made in the illusionistic perspective technique, organizing complex virtual architectural structures ornamented with garlands and scrolls, which support a central medallion, where the main scene of the set appears, usually showing Jesus or the Virgin Mary in glorifying situations. Like other works of the Baroque period, the painting should edify the observer and instruct him in the precepts of the Catholic Church, making use of a sumptuous plasticity that, through the seduction of the senses, leads the devotee to the contemplation of the beauties of the spirit.

Despite having garnered critical attention from various scholars, further exploration of his oeuvre remains necessary, particularly concerning authorship. As he did not sign his works, many attributions are based solely on oral tradition, lacking corroborative documentation. Nonetheless, José Joaquim da Rocha is recognized as a significant figure in the history of Brazilian art, noted as the founder of the Bahian school of painting and acknowledged as one of the masters of the Brazilian Baroque. He mentored several disciples and left a lasting influence on two generations of artists, who upheld the principles of his aesthetic until the mid-19th century.

== Biography ==
There is limited information available about his life, and most of the works attributed to him lack supporting documentation. An anonymous manuscript found by Carlos Ott in the National Library, dated between 1866 and 1876, suggests that José Joaquim originated from Minas Gerais, though this claim is questionable. Alternative sources propose Salvador, Rio de Janeiro, or even Portugal. The exact year of his birth remains uncertain, although it is reported that he was 70 years old at the time of his death in 1807.

Between 1764 and 1765, he was in Salvador, where he may have studied under Antônio Simões Ribeiro. During this period, he collaborated with Leandro Ferreira de Sousa on a panel painting of Christ tied to a column and on the gilding of the frame for a work commissioned by the Santa Casa da Misericórdia da Bahia. At that time, he resided in a modest two-story house owned by the Santa Casa.

There is no record of his life between January 22, 1766, and August 28, 1769. It is possible that he traveled to Joao Pessoa to work on the Convent and Church of St. Anthony, where the famous ceiling depicting the Glorification of the Franciscan Saints is attributed to him by some sources, though this attribution lacks documentation. According to oral tradition, he may have gone to Lisbon during this period to further his education and came into contact with Antonio Lobo and Jerônimo de Andrade - although it is not known who might have been his patron. However, researcher Maria de Fátima Campos argues that Salvador was already capable of providing a suitable education for a talented young artist. Upon his return, he was a mature painter competing for a major commission for illusionistic perspective painting—a technique requiring exceptional skill—in the Church of Our Lady of Health and Glory. Despite offering a more advantageous price, the commission was awarded to Domingos da Costa Filgueira.

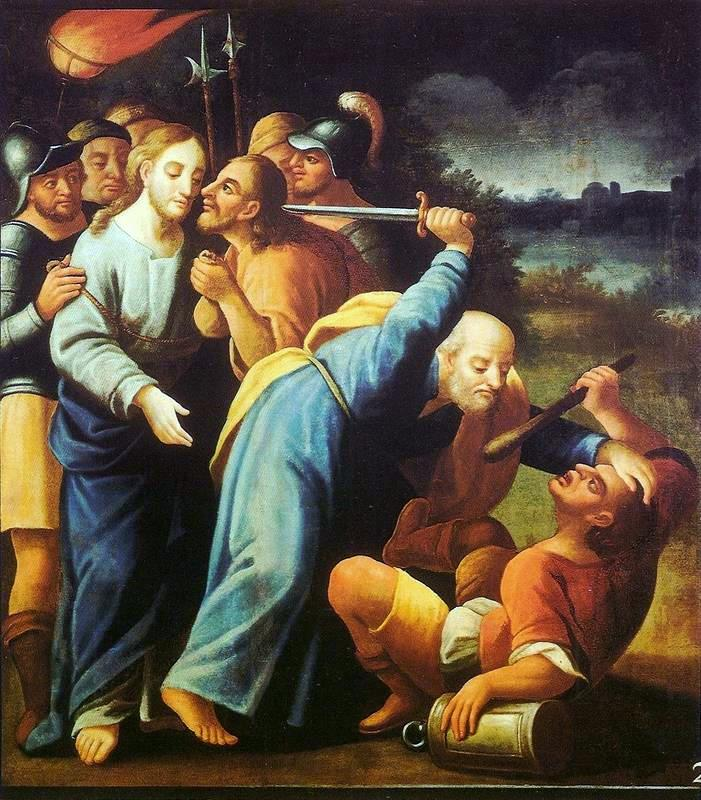
The kiss of Judas and Peter cutting off Malchus' ear. Flag of the Procession of Bonfires. Santa Casa da Misericórdia da Bahia

He may have traveled to Recife in 1769 to decorate the ceiling of the Church and Convent of Saint Antony, though the authorship of this work remains uncertain. In 1770, he might have decorated the Church of the Third Order of the Blessed Virgin Mary of Our Lady of the Conception of the Mulatto Brothers. By 1772 or 1773, he was in Salvador, where he was commissioned to paint an illusionistic perspective on the ceiling of the Basilica of the Immaculate Conception, one of the most important churches in Bahia at the time. This work became his masterpiece and is regarded as one of the most remarkable paintings of its kind in Brazil. It features a grand depiction of the Glorification of the Immaculate Conception, surrounded by allegories of the four continents, divine figures, and monumental illusionistic architecture. The contract also included painting the chancel and crafting a statue of Mary on the main altar. The success of the ceiling composition cemented his reputation as the foremost painter in Bahia. Following this, he was able to establish a permanent team of assistants and train disciples. In 1777, he undertook the task of painting a Visitation of Mary to Saint Elizabeth for the altarpiece of the chapel of the Santa Casa da Misericórdia, which is considered one of his finest works on canvas.

The subsequent period was notably productive. Between 1778 and 1780, the Third Order of Our Lady of Mount Carmel commissioned him to gild the altarpiece of the chancel, and he may also have created the panel featuring the image, though this work was lost in a fire shortly afterward. Around 1780, he painted another Visitation for the Secretariat of the Santa Casa while simultaneously working on the ceilings of the Church of the Good Jesus of the Afflicted (circa 1780), the Church of the Third Order of Our Lady of the Rosary of the Black People (1780) and the Church of the Third Order of Saint Dominic (1781). In 1785, he began work on the Church and Convent of Our Lady of the Palm, a project that would remain incomplete for several years. During the initial phase, he designed the central medallion and the perspective of the ceiling, but the actual execution was carried out by an unknown painter, possibly his disciple Veríssimo de Freitas.

During this time, he is also believed to have painted the ceiling of the Old Chapel of Saint Peter. While the contract for this work is not preserved, parish records indicate his appointment as Brother of the Resurrection in 1786, suggesting his involvement with the church. The painting was later retouched by José Rodrigues Nunes and, more recently, was destroyed along with the church. During the same period, he may also have created the ceiling and two canvases for the Parish of Our Lady of Nazareth in Salvador. Such a volume of significant commissions would have required him to have assembled a substantial team of assistants and apprentices to manage the workload.

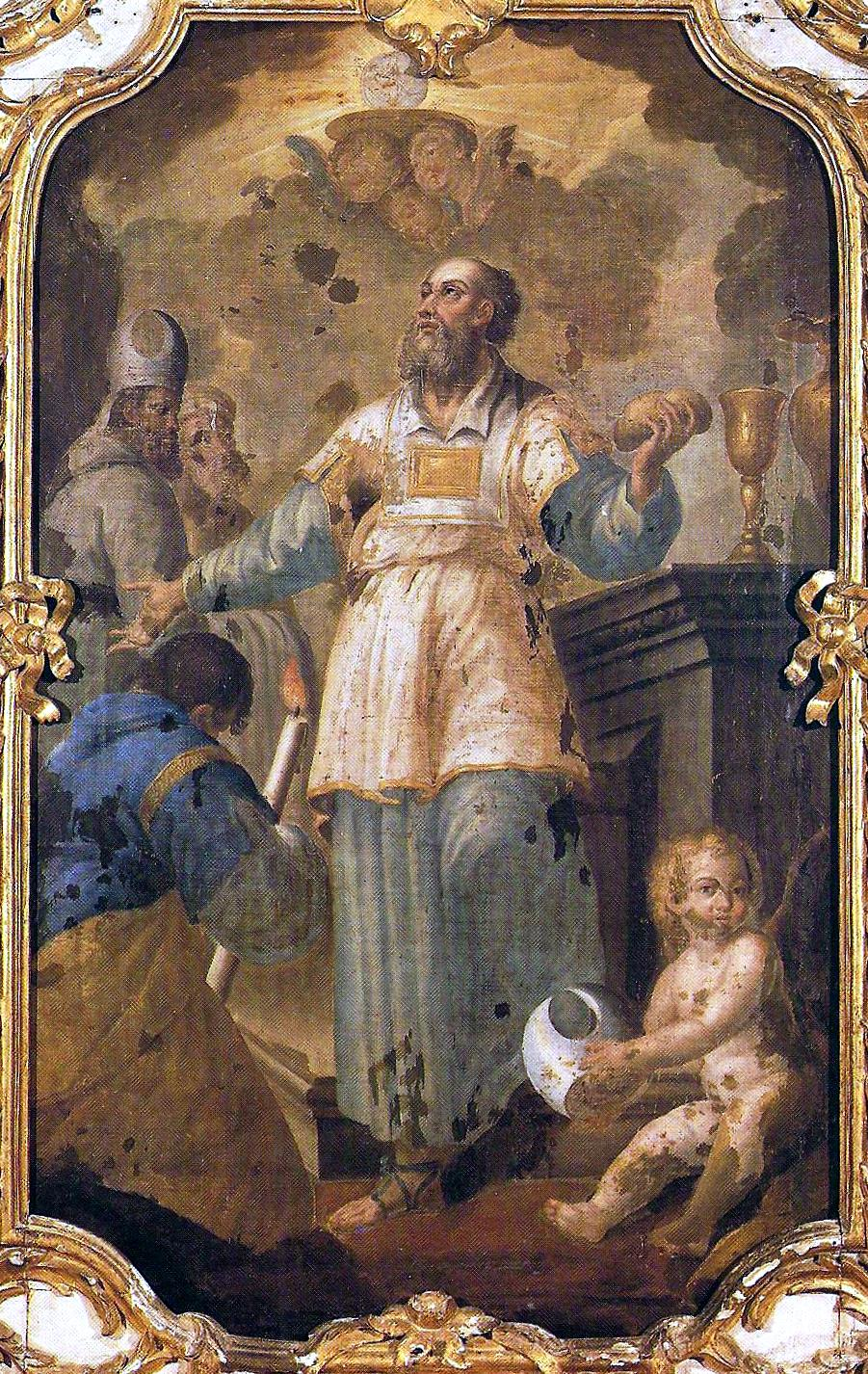
Jewish priest offering bread and wine, Museum of Sacred Art of Bahia

Around 1790, he completed another series of secondary panels for the Church and Convent of Our Lady of the Palm, with his authorship of these works being more securely established. Consequently, the church became the largest repository of José Joaquim's art. In recognition of his dedication, the Brotherhood of the Good Jesus of the Cross honored him with the title of Honorary Brother. In 1792, he created six large paintings for the chancel of the Santa Casa and was also responsible for gilding the frames. Shortly afterward, he contributed several panels to the Mercês Chapel.

Despite an improved economic situation compared to his earlier years, he never amassed great wealth, even with numerous commissions and the ability to set prices. In 1794, in his later years, he sold his house for an undisclosed reason. It is believed that he did this to support his favored disciple, José Teófilo de Jesus, who went to Europe to improve himself, at the master's expense.

His final significant commission came in 1796, involving six panels with gilding for the sacristy of the Parish Church of Our Lady of Pilar. After this, he focused on smaller works, including a depiction of Christ with a green cane for the Santa Casa da Misericórdia in 1796 and two paintings for the Church of the Third Order of Saint Francis. Subsequently, details about his life become scarce. Between 1802 and 1803, he resided in a modest rented house owned by the Third Order of Our Lady of Mount Carmel. His later years were marked by illness, and he spent them in a country house he owned in the Parish of Saint Anthony. He died on October 12, 1807, without having married or leaving any known descendants. He was buried in the Church and Convent of Our Lady of the Palm.

== Work and context ==
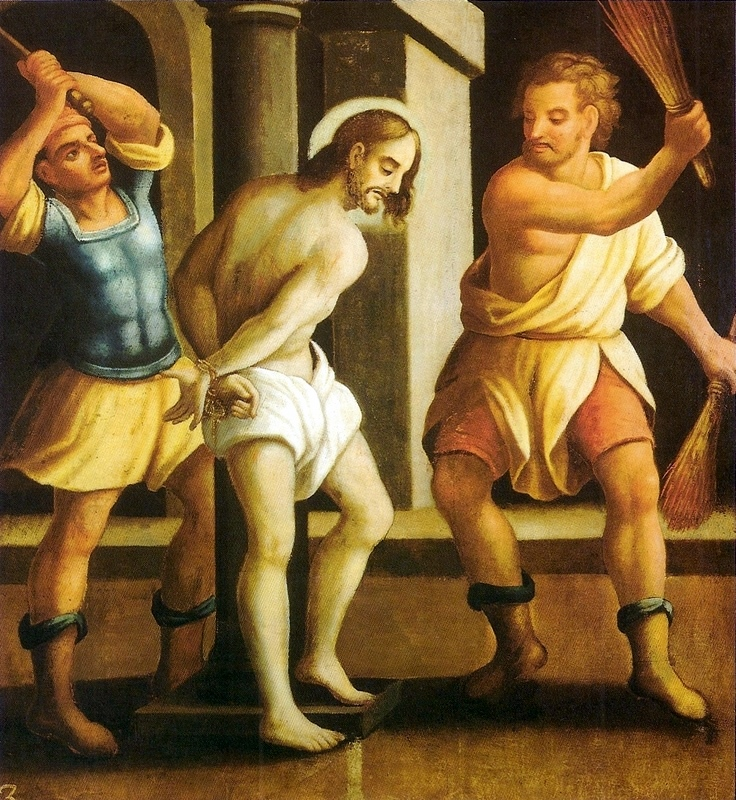
Flagellation of Christ. Flag of the Procession of Bonfires. Museum of Sacred Art of Bahia

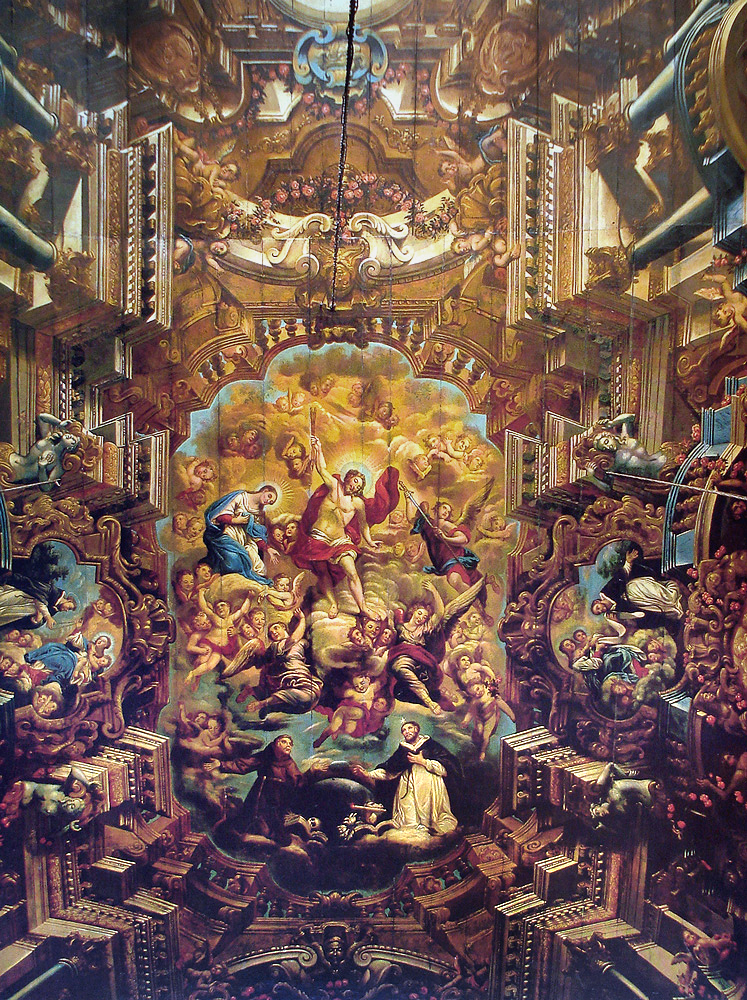
The ceiling of the Church of the Third Order of Penitence of Saint Dominic of Osma

During the period in question, the Catholic Church served as the primary patron of the arts in Brazil, leading to José Joaquim da Rocha's exclusive focus on sacred art due to the limited market for secular painting. His stylistic influences were derived from both direct learning from established masters—particularly from the Portuguese painting school—and from studying a rich array of engravings and prints circulating in the colony. This diverse array of European imports, many of which were copies of famous works, contributes to the imitative and creative nature of Brazilian Baroque and Joaquim's work. He often adapted established formulas in innovative ways, using these images as models, which accounts for the variability in the quality of his production. Additionally, his use of apprentices at different stages of training complicates the identification of his style and contributions. Nonetheless, such characteristics were typical of the period and helped define the Brazilian Baroque.

José Joaquim's work continues to be a subject for further study, with critics highlighting various aspects of his history and artistic individuality. His style is often described as dense and highly plastic, showcasing a level of refinement and technical skill that is notable among his contemporaries. His work reflects an erudite and disciplined character, adhering to the conventions of his time while still demonstrating notable creativity. As a result, he has inspired two generations of followers.

José Joaquim's works in an illusionistic perspective, notably on the ceilings of the Basilica of the Immaculate Conception, the Church of the Third Order of Saint Dominic, and the Church of the Third Order of Our Lady of the Rosary of the Black People (attribution), are among his most notable creations. This technique, highly valued in colonial Brazil, is rooted in a tradition initiated in Italy and perfected by Andrea Pozzo in the 17th century. Pozzo's approach created an illusion of three-dimensional space on ceilings, transforming them into visions of the sky. Mastery of this technique required extensive knowledge of perspective, achievable only by exceptionally skilled and well-trained artists. Though he may have learned this technique in Portugal, Pozzo’s influence was already present in Brazil by the early 18th century. It is possible that he encountered Pozzo’s renowned work, the ceiling of the Church of St. Ignatius of Loyola in Rome, through engravings. Carlos Ott proposed that Joaquim's supposed trip to Portugal might have included a visit to Italy, where he could have seen this celebrated painting. However, according to Paiva & Pires, Joaquim's interpretation of Pozzo's style aligns more closely with a Portuguese tradition. While Pozzo emphasized seamless integration of figures into the architectural illusion, Portuguese artists, including Joaquim, often created a well-defined central medallion with less pronounced outlines for figures, resulting in a flatter spatial effect. This approach, referred to as "relocated painting", mirrored the spatial composition typical of traditional wall panels.

The themes of José Joaquim's works were largely influenced by the preferences of the sponsoring brotherhoods. The most prevalent subjects featured the Virgin Mary, such as her marriage, the Annunciation, the Visitation, and the birth of Jesus. The scenes from the life of Christ, even though less common, left some works such as the Passion and Death, the Resurrection, and the Pentecost.

== Legacy ==
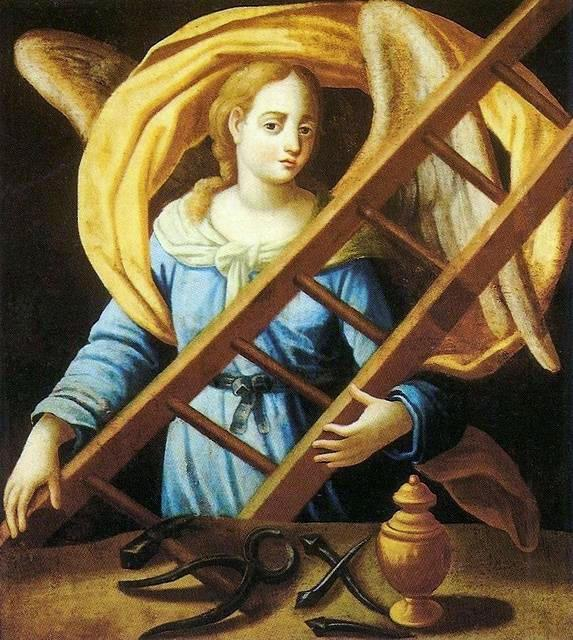
Angel with Instruments of the Passion: Ladder, cloves, and ointment jar, 1786. Bahia Museum of Art

Until José Joaquim's emergence, painting in Bahia was relatively modest. Although Salvador was the capital of the colony and a bustling commercial hub, it remained a small city, reaching a population of only 50,000 by 1808. It was also the principal cultural center of Brazil, but its culture was largely provincial, heavily influenced by religion, and reliant on slave labor. Artistically, Salvador depended on improvisation and poorly trained, underpaid craftsmen, including slaves and freedmen. Notable early artists included Calmão, Simões, Filgueira, and Maciel, who were predecessors and contemporaries of José Joaquim. While these artists made significant contributions as pioneers, Joaquim’s greatest legacy lies in his transformative impact on the Bahia school of painting. He is credited with revitalizing and advancing the school, establishing himself as its founder and most distinguished member, and preserving the baroque tradition well into the mid-19th century.

In a 1961 survey, Carlos Ott cataloged 52 works attributed to Joaquim, including both confirmed and disputed pieces. By 2005, Percival Tirapeli noted that the number of identified works had increased to 150. However, these figures may be subject to debate, as there is considerable controversy over the attributions. Most of Joaquim’s works remain in their original locations, but some of his easel paintings are housed in the Bahia Museum of Art, the Museum of Sacred Art of Bahia, and the Museum of the Santa Casa de Misericórdia of Bahia.

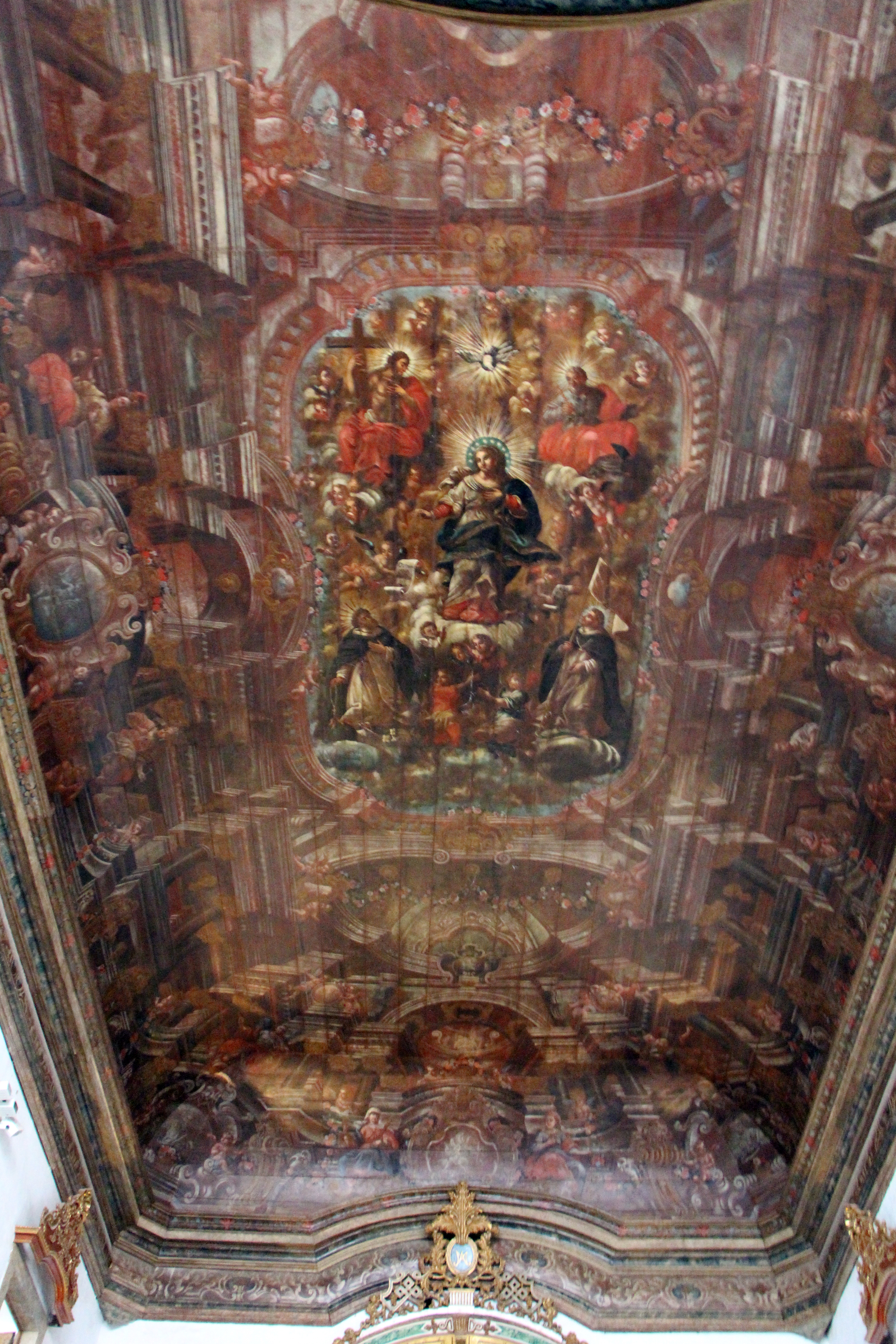
The ceiling of the Church of the Third Order of Our Lady of the Rosary of the Black People, attributed to Rocha by Carlos Ott.

Among José Joaquim's disciples were Sousa Coutinho, Franco Velasco, Lopes Marques, Antônio Dias, Nunes da Mota, Mateus Lopes, Veríssimo de Freitas, Rufino Capinam, and José Teófilo de Jesus, who was both the most significant of his pupils and his favorite. His work has been studied by Manuel Raimundo Querino (who introduced the concept of the "School of Bahia"), Carlos Ott, Clarival do Prado Valadares, Marieta Alves, and Maria de Fátima Campos, among others. However, further research is needed to resolve ongoing controversies and uncertainties, particularly concerning the attribution of authorship. Despite these issues, Joaquim's importance is widely recognized. As Carlos Ott succinctly put it:

Although he was inspired by Portuguese and particularly Italian painting, he created a new painting: the painting of Bahia. And this at a time when in Brazil, still a Portuguese colony, few artists reveal a typically Brazilian mentality. José Joaquim da Rocha's paintings are not about popular art, as is the case with countless paintings existing in the churches of Bahia. He went through a school and, what was more, founded a school for painters.

Joaquim's legacy also requires better preservation. The ceiling of the Basilica of the Immaculate Conception, his greatest work and one of the most important of the Brazilian Baroque, was for several years in the process of degradation, and according to technical reports, it almost collapsed, but the National Institute of Historic and Artistic Heritage (IPHAN) started an emergency restoration in 2012. The works of the Old Chapel of Saint Peter, considered among his best, were destroyed in a renovation in the 20th century. Similarly, the ceiling of the Church of the Third Order of Our Lady of the Rosary of the Black People, also regarded as one of his best (if it is indeed his work), was long obscured by repainting and forgotten. It was rediscovered during a restoration in 1979 but faced further deterioration from mold, dirt, moisture, and varnish oxidation. It was again "rediscovered" and restored in 2010.

== See also ==
- Andrea Pozzo
- Manoel da Costa Ataíde
