= Church of the Third Order of the Blessed Virgin Mary of Our Lady of the Conception of the Mulatto Brothers =

Roman Catholic church in Bahia, Brazil

- Igreja da Ordem Terceira da Beata Maria Virgem de Nossa Senhora da Conceição dos Irmãos Pardos
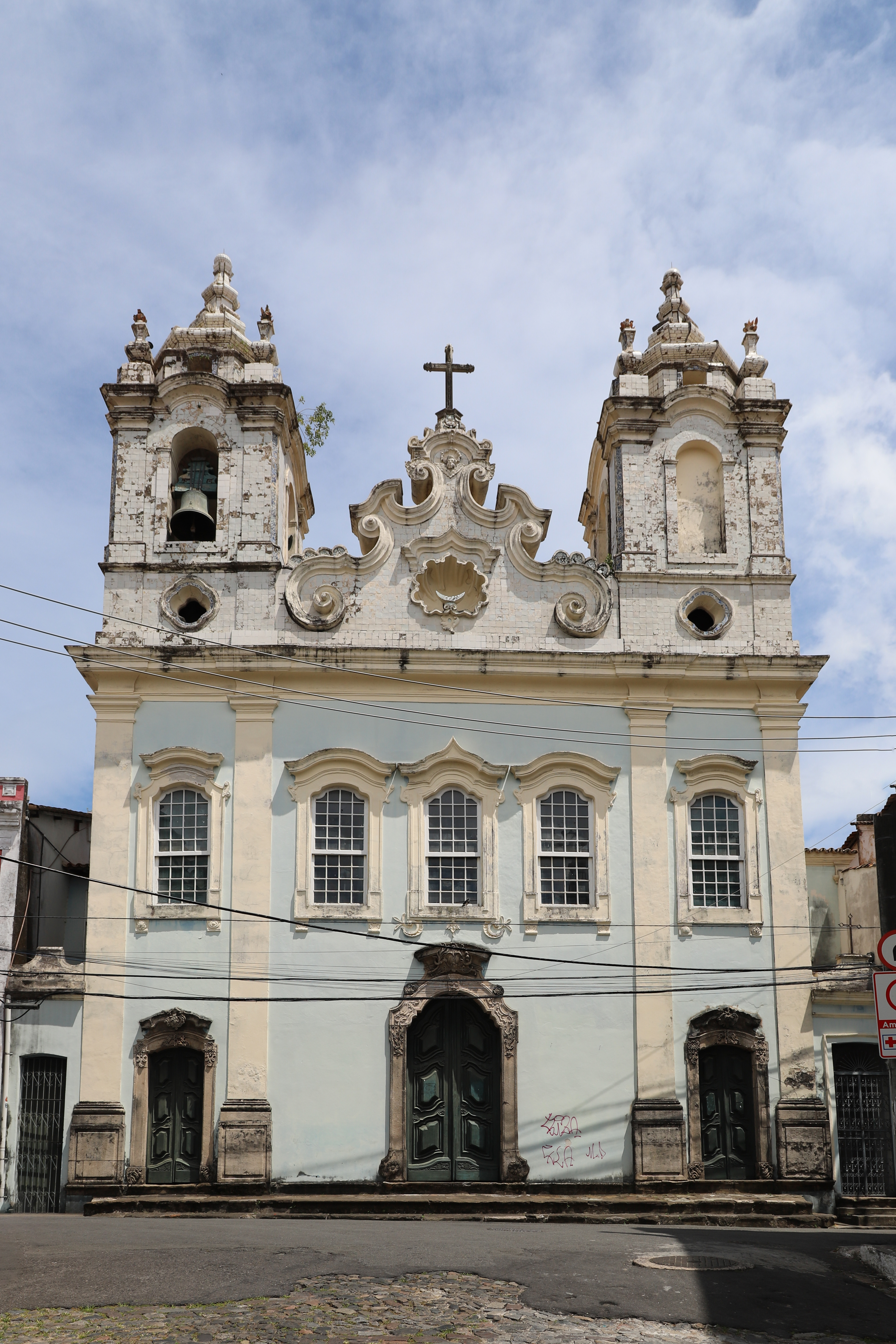
- Church of the Third Order of the Blessed Virgin Mary of Our Lady of the Conception of the Mulatto Brothers, Salvador, Bahia, Brazil

- Location of the Church of the Third Order of the Blessed Virgin Mary of Our Lady of the Conception of the Mulatto Brothers in Brazil Church of the Third Order of the Blessed Virgin Mary of Our Lady of the Conception of the Mulatto Brothers (South America)

Religion
- Affiliation: Catholic
- Rite: Roman

Location
- Municipality: Salvador
- State: Bahia
- Country: Brazil
- Interactive map of Church of the Third Order of the Blessed Virgin Mary of Our Lady of the Conception of the Mulatto Brothers
- Coordinates: 12.96628°S 38.50572°W

Architecture
- Established: 1732
- Direction of façade: West

National Historic Heritage of Brazil
- Designated: 1951
- Reference no.: 480

The Church of the Third Order of the Blessed Virgin Mary of Our Lady of the Conception of the Mulatto Brothers (Portuguese: Igreja da Ordem Terceira da Beata Maria Virgem de Nossa Senhora da Conceição dos Irmãos Pardos, Igreja da Ordem Terceira da Nossa Senhora da Conceição dos Boqueirão) is an 18th-century Roman Catholic church and former convent in Salvador, Bahia, Brazil. The church was constructed in a neighborhood formerly occupied by mixed-race and Afro-Brazilian artisans. The exterior of the church has an elaborate roccoco pediment and towers; the interior of the church has a Baroque-style ceiling painting in the nave and neoclassical side altars and chancel. The name of the church, boqueirão, refers to a large slope and trench constructed between the high city (cidade alta) and low city (cidade baixa) of Salvador; it served as a defense of the city against foreign invasion. It was listed as a historic structure by the National Historic and Artistic Heritage Institute in 1951.

== History ==
The Third Order of the Blessed Virgin Mary of Our Lady of the Conception of the Mulatto Brothers of Boqueirão was founded in the late 17th or early 18th century. The Brotherhood initially met at the Church of Santo António Além do Carmo. The church sits above a neighborhood formerly inhabited by mixed-race and Afro-Brazilian craftsmen and artisans. The Viceroy of Brazil granted the brotherhood in 1726, and work began on the church in 1727. It was carried out by members of the Brotherhood. The walls and triangular pediment were completed by 1758, and Manuel Oliveira Mendes, Master of Public Works in Salvador, carried out a survey of the building in 1773. The catacombs were completed below the church in the 19th century; the interior of the church was completed in the same period.

== Location ==
The Church of the Third Order of the Blessed Virgin Mary of Our Lady of the Conception of the Mulatto Brothers is located within the Historic Center of Salvador. It sits on Rua Direita de Santo Antônio. It faces a sloping square, the Boqueirão, that connects the Pelourinho to the Baixa dos Sapateiros. The rear of the church faces the Bay of All Saints. The church is surrounded by 19th-century sobrados, or colonial houses.

== Structure ==
The Church of the Third Order of the Blessed Virgin Mary of Our Lady of the Conception of the Mulatto Brothers is built on four levels. The ground-level floor consists of a nave, chancel, galleries, a large sacristy, consistory. Windows in the sacristy of the church offer broad views of the Bay of All Saints. The choir is located on the upper floor. A small oratório sits to the right of the structure and opens at street level; the stairs that access the catacombs are located behind it. The façade has two towers that frame a central body. It culminates in a monumental pediment in the rococo style typical of Bahian architecture of the period. The pediment has volutes and a central niche in the shape of a shell. It is tiled in azulejos and crowned by a cross on a pedestal. Both the pediment and towers are decorated with white azulejo tiles. The two towers that flank the central pediment have windows, flame urns, and bulbous spires with a ball finial. A rectangular oculus is located at four sides of the spire. Only the left tower contains bells; the windows of the right tower are blocked.

=== Interior ===
The interior of the church is in the Neoclassical style common to Bahian churches of the 19th century. The nave has a Baroque-style trompe-l'œil ceiling painting by José Joaquim da Rocha. It depicts a celestial vision of the Virgin Mary, under the title of the Immaculate Conception, and also depicts the glorification of the Holy Trinity. The church is noted for an image of Our Lady of Piety, sculpted by an unknown artist in the 18th century. Joaquim de Mattos completed carvings, or talha dourada, of the chancel; Antônio de Santa Rosa completed those of the chancel arch and side altars.

== Protected status ==
The Church of the Third Order of the Blessed Virgin Mary of Our Lady of the Conception of the Mulatto Brothers was listed as a historic structure by the National Historic and Artistic Heritage Institute in 1951. The structures were registered under the Book of Historical Works, Inscription no. 480.

== Access ==
The Church of the Third Order of the Blessed Virgin Mary of Our Lady of the Conception of the Mulatto Brothers is open to the public and may be visited.
