= Basilica of the Immaculate Conception, Salvador =

Church building in Salvador, Brazil

Basilica of the Immaculate Conception
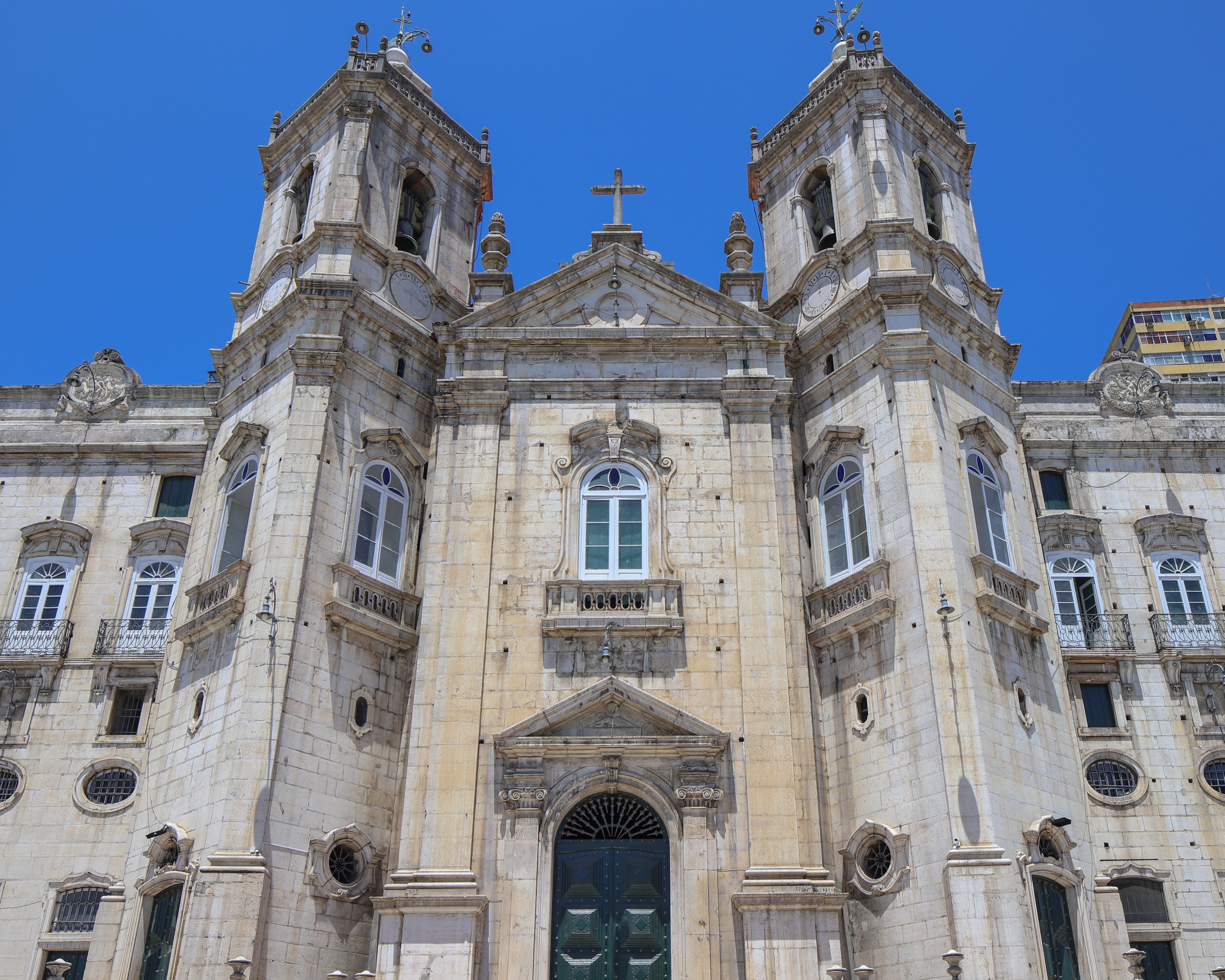
- Façade of Church of Nossa Senhora da Conceição da Praia

- Location of the Basilica of the Immaculate Conception in Brazil

Religion
- Affiliation: Catholic
- Rite: Roman

Location
- Municipality: Salvador
- State: Bahia
- Country: Brazil
- Interactive map of Basilica of the Immaculate Conception
- Coordinates: 12.975300°S 38.514290°W

Architecture
- Architect: Manuel Cardoso Saldanha
- Groundbreaking: 1739
- Completed: 1849

Specifications
- Length: 56 metres (184 ft)
- Width: 43.9 metres (144 ft)

National Historic Heritage of Brazil
- Designated: 1938
- Reference no.: 122

The Basilica of the Immaculate Conception (Portuguese: Basílica Nossa Senhora da Conceição da Praia), or the Basilica of the Conception, is a church in Salvador, Bahia, Brazil. It is affiliated with the Catholic Church and was built in 1623, making it one of the oldest parishes in the Roman Catholic Archdiocese of São Salvador da Bahia. It was the first church built by the first governor-general of Brazil, Tomé de Sousa. The current structure was prefabricated in Portugal and assembled in Salvador; its construction began in 1739 and ended in the mid-19th century. The art historian Germain Bazin classifies the church as Portuguese in design, rather than part of the Bahian tradition of religious structures of the 17th and 18th centuries.

Its monumental façade is a hybrid of Baroque and Neoclassical styles, and is based on church façades of the period in Portugal. The building was designed by Manuel Cardoso Saldanha; the master bricklayer and architect Eugénio da Mota prepared the stonework in Portugal and accompanied it to Salvador. Its elevation to the status of basilica took place in 1946. Pope Pius XII declared Our Lady of Conception the sole patron of the State of Bahia. Robert C. Smith described the structure as the "first and most complete expression in Brazil of the new Baroque style that succeeded Mannerism in Portugal in the early years of John V's reign." The Portuguese art historian João Miguel dos Santos Simões stated that "Among the remarkable examples of 18th-century architecture that the Portuguese built on Brazilian soil, this one, honoring the patron saint of the Kingdom, stands out in historical importance and majesty."

== Location ==
The Basilica of the Immaculate Conception faces directly northwest onto the Bay of All Saints. The church once sat on the shore of the bay, and parts of the church, notably the chancel, were built directly into the cliff between the lower and upper city. Prior to its elevation to a basilica, it was known as the Igreja da Nossa Senhora da Conceição da Praia, or literally "Our Lady of the Conception of the Beach." Landfill and extensive port expansion of the cidade baixa, or lower city of Salvador, was carried out in the 19th century. The church no longer sits directly on the bay, but rather faces a facility of the Brazilian Navy. The port facilities of the 19th century were replaced by high-rise buildings and a commercial center in the 20th century, in contrast to the Baroque-style structure.

== History ==
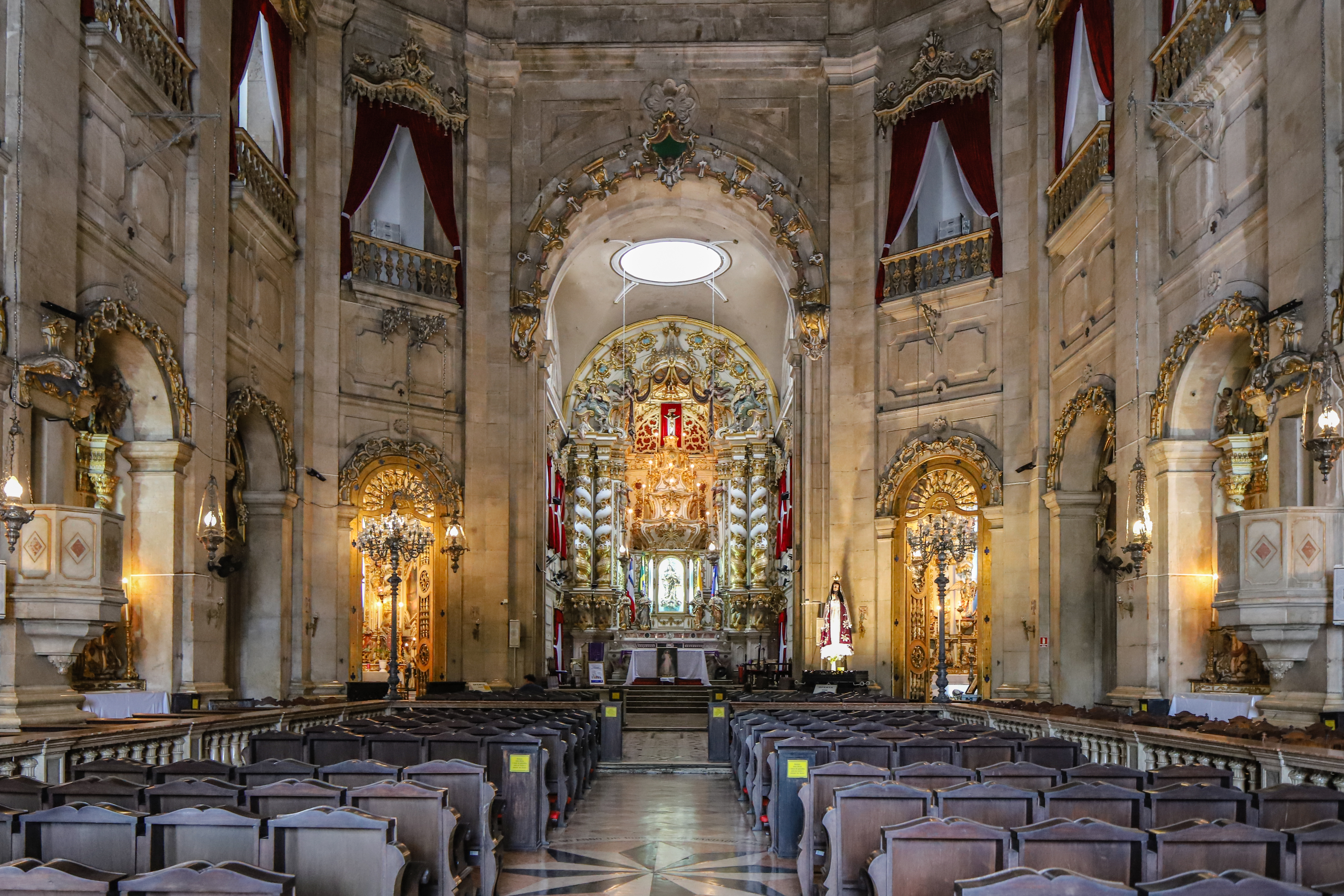
View of nave and chancel

=== Early history ===
The present church structure is the third to be built on the site. Tomé de Sousa (1503-1579), the first governor-general of the Portuguese colony of Brazil, established a primitive settlement and chapel in 1549 on the site of the current church in the initial period of construction of Salvador. Father Manuel da Nóbrega (1517-1570) and six Jesuit clergymen personally built a small mud-walled chapel at the base of the slope between the current upper and lower city. The chapel was dedicated to Our Lady of the Conception and housed an image of the saint brought by Tomé de Sousa from Portugal. The site sits close to the oceanfront and was a place of worship for sailors and tradesmen arriving in Brazil; they christened the church the Conception of the Beach (Conceição da Praia), a name that remained during subsequent reconstructions.

=== 17th century ===
The growth of the population of the Cidade Baixa and area near the port of Salvador necessitated the construction of a larger church. Marcos Teixeira de Mendonça (1578-1624), a bishop and resistance leader against the Dutch attacks against Brazil, expanded the structure in 1623. It was renamed Matriz da Nova Freguesia de Nossa Senhora da Conceição da Praia and was financed by wealthy Portuguese merchants in the area.

=== 18th century ===
The Santíssimo Sacramento da Imaculada Conceição, a fraternal order, decided to completely rebuild the church in 1736. The military engineer Manuel Cardoso de Saldanha planned the church and Manuel Vicente, a master stonemason, supervised its construction. The master bricklayer and architect Eugénio da Mota prepared the lioz stonework in Portugal and accompanied it to Salvador. The import of lioz stonework from Portugal for use as architectural elements in Brazil began in the 16th century; it additionally served as ballast for Portuguese ships travelling to Brazil. The church is the second in Brazil constructed entirely of lioz, the first being the Jesuit church of Salvador, now the Cathedral Basilica of Salvador. The art historian Germain Bazin classifies it as the only Portuguese church in Bahia, and outside of the progression of design of other religious structures in the region.

Construction on the church began in 1739 but was delayed in 1758 by a financial downturn in Bahia. The woodcarver Lourenço Rodrigues Lançarote completed the elaborate side altars in 1765; he had earlier completed similar work in the Church of the Third Order of Mount Carmel. João Moreira de Espírito Santo completed the high altar between 1765 and 1773. The new structure, still unfinished, was dedicated on December 8 of the same year by the Archbishop of Bahia, Frei Manuel de Santa Inês Ferreira (1704-1771). Eugénio da Mota returned to Lisbon in 1769, "aged and nearly blind". The structure, but not its interior decorative elements, were completed in 1773.

=== 19th century ===
Four Portuguese masons succeeded Da Mota. The completion of the central section and left wing of the church in 1820 marked the end of major construction of the structure. By 1820 the fraternal order had spent 208,234,000 Portuguese réis on the church, making it one of the costliest in Bahia. The massive staircase in lioz and right wing of the structure were completed in 1850.

The church of the Immaculate Conception received the title of minor basilica by the Apostolic Letter "Coruscantis sideris" of the 7 of October 1946, by decision of the Holy See.

== Structure ==
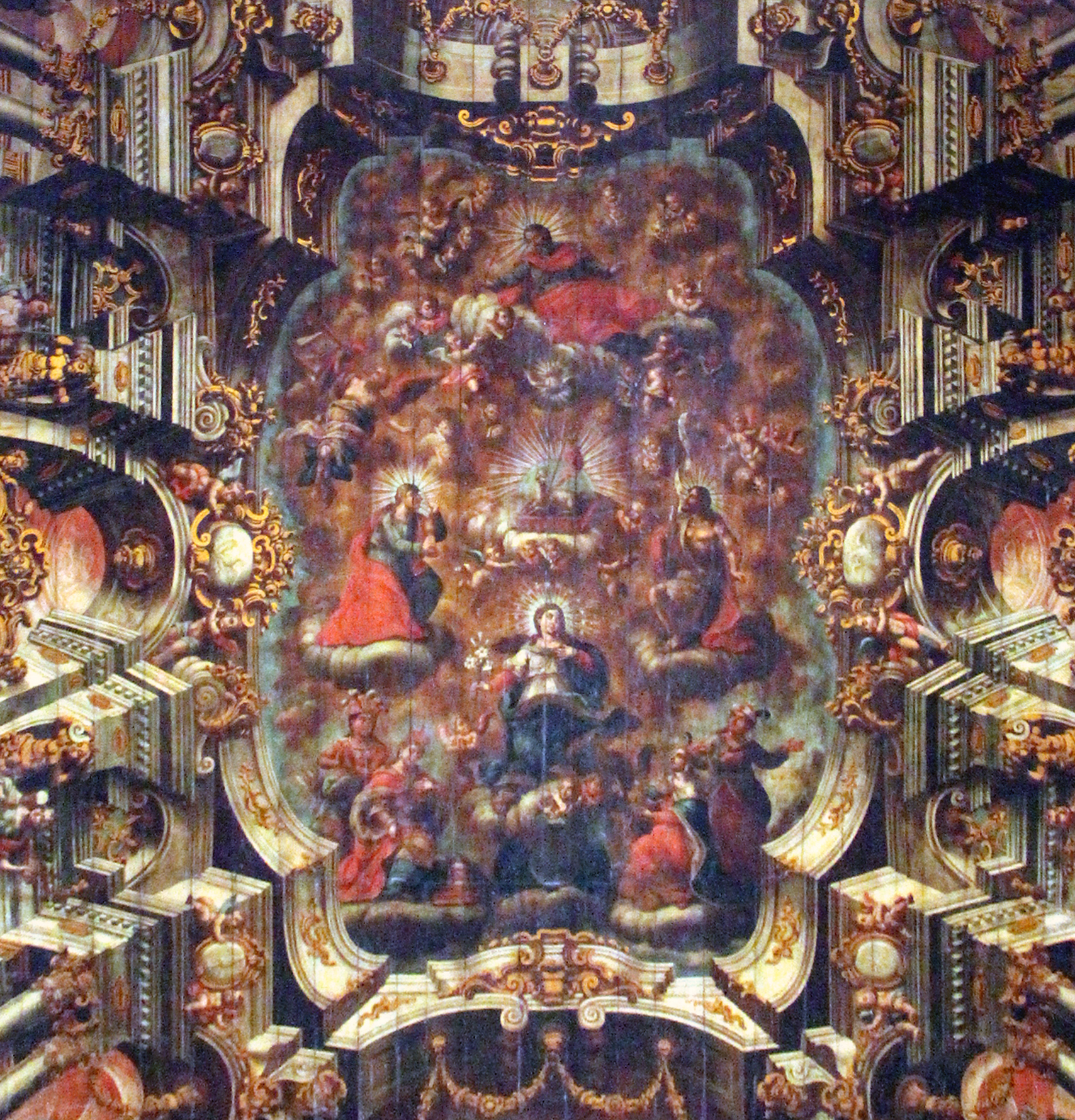
Monumental nave ceiling painting, José Joaquim da Rocha, 1772-1776

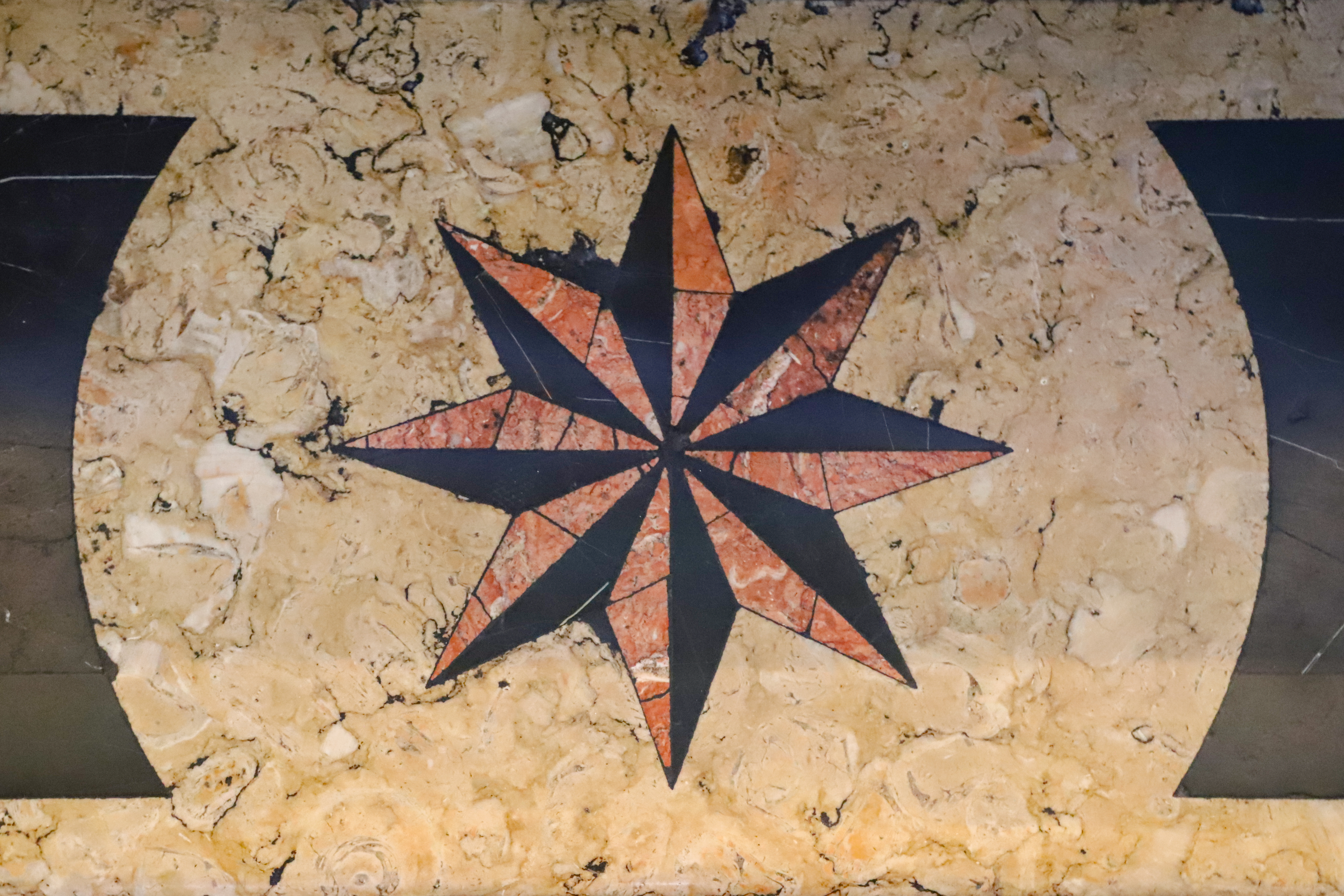
Lioz inlay, flooring of chancel.

The Basilica of the Immaculate Conception has a monumental façade of lioz, with straight lines and rectangular details. The façade is flanked by two diagonal towers which "give a baroque touch to the design of the church box." The church is noted for its use of natural light: it has a copula above the chancel and faces directly west to utilize light from the Bay of All Saints via numerous doors and windows.

=== Church bells ===
The basilica has 16 church bells. They served as an alarm system to the entire city of Salvador from the 18th century. The bells fell into disuse by 1990. They were restored and reactivated in 2021, and ring at 12 noon and 6pm. The bells can additionally play hymns for special occasions.

=== Interior ===
The interior of the church is the first complete example of the Baroque style of John V of Portugal; it was partially altered in the Neoclassical style in the 19th century. The high altar is ornate, with monumental Solomonic columns, an altar in silver, and an image of Our Lady of the Conception at center. The master carver João Moreira do Espírito Santo completed the carving of the high altar in cedar between 1765 and 1773. Domingos Luiz Soares, among others, is responsible for the gilding of the high altar. The Italianate Solomonic columns, which are white with gilded floral garlands and acanthus details, resemble those of the baldachin of St. Peter's Basilica. A copula and two massive oculi in the chancel ceiling provides natural light to the chancel and high altar. The chancel additionally has a rich collection of baroque-style furniture in jacaranda wood and candlesticks and lamps in silver. The portals between the nave and chancel and the lateral portals are in an Italianate style, and the only baroque elements of the interior of the church.

=== Nave ceiling ===
The ceiling of the nave has a large-scale painting of Our Lady of the Conception. It was painted in the Italianate Baroque illusionist style and by José Joaquim da Rocha (c. 1737–1807). The painting was executed in oil on wood between 1772 and 1776. João Miguel dos Santos Simões considers it Rocha's most important work.

=== Side chapels ===
The church has eight side chapels: three along each side of the nave and one at either side of the high altar. The chapel at the right of the higher altar is dedicated to the Holy Christ (Capela do Santo Cristo).

At the left of the nave, from left to right:

- Chapel of Saint Joseph (Capela de São José)
- Chapel of Our Lady of Sorrows (Capela de Nossa Senhora das Dôres)
- Chapel of Saint John the Baptist (Capela de São João Batista), with an image of Our Lady of Fátima below

At the right of the nave, from left to right:

- Chapel of Our Lady of the Rosary (Capela Nossa Senhora do Rosário), with an image of Saint Pantaleon below
- Chapel of Saint Anthony (Capela de Santo Antônio), with an image of Saint Joseph below
- Chapel of Saint Benedict (Capela de Sao Benedito)

=== Baptismal font ===
A large-scale baptismal font sits in a niche at the rear of the nave. It is of rare marble of the Arrábida region of Portugal, and is a dark reddish-brown color. The walls of the niche are lined with blue, yellow, and white azulejos.

=== Patio ===
A lateral corridor on the north side of the nave leads to an interior patio with a fountain. The lateral corridor is simple and decorated with azulejos of the 19th century, while the patio and its elements are entirely constructed of lioz. The patio has a staircase leading to the meeting room of the Brotherhood.

== Protected status ==
The Basilica of the Immaculate Conception was listed as a historic structure by the National Institute of Historic and Artistic Heritage in 1938. It is listed in the Book of Historical Works process no. 112-T, inscription no. 126.

== Access ==
The Basilica of the Immaculate Conception is located in the Comercio district near the Lacerda Elevator and Modelo Market and may be visited.

== See also ==
- Roman Catholicism in Brazil
- Our Lady of the Immaculate Conception
