= Bahia Museum of Art =

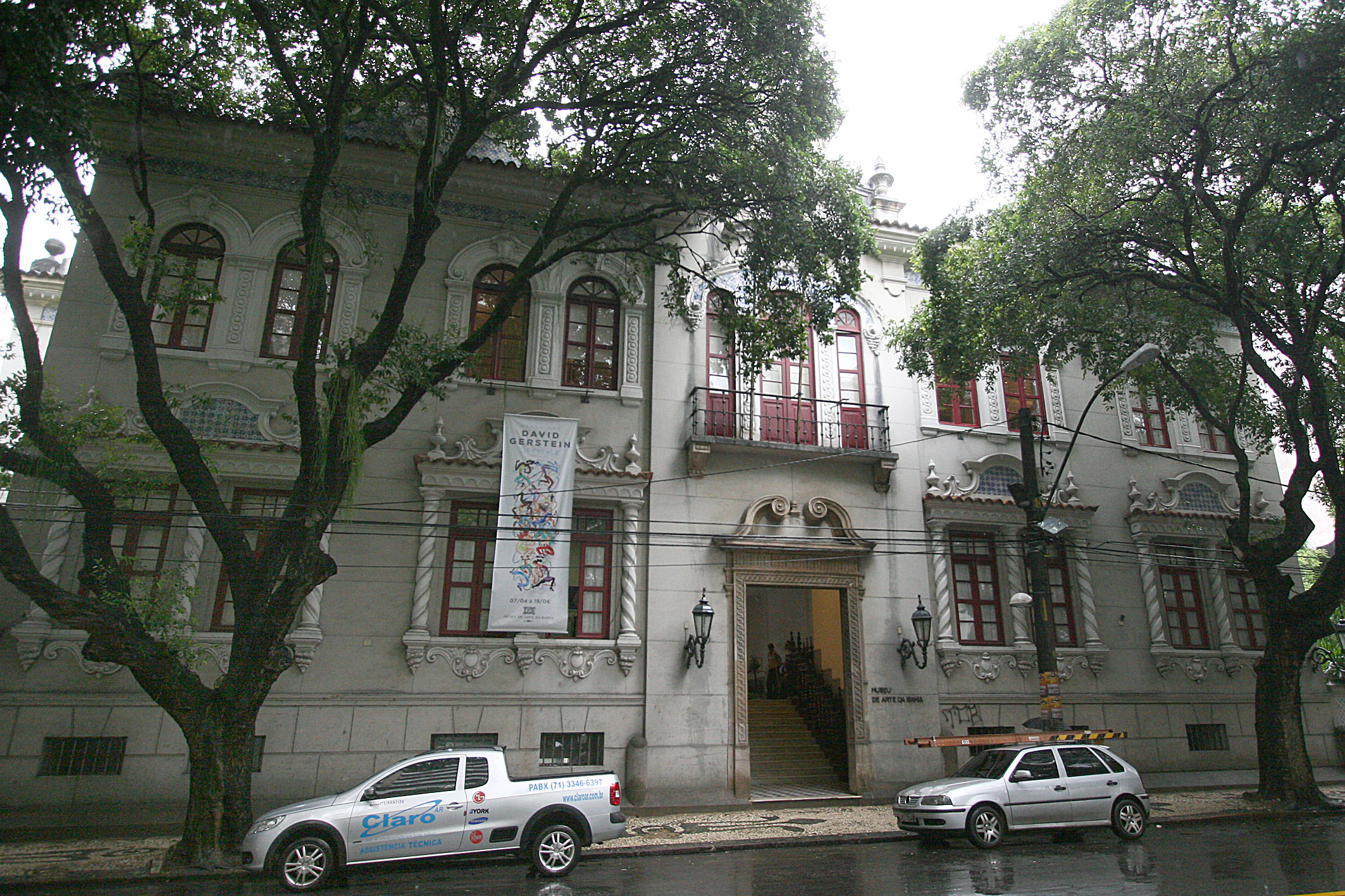
- Established: July 23, 1918; 107 years ago
- Location: Salvador, Brazil
- Coordinates: 12.993657°S 38.525977°W
- Type: Art museum

The Bahia Museum of Art (Portuguese: Museu de Arte da Bahia) is a museum located in Salvador de Bahia, Brazil. This museum is one of the oldest museums in the State of Bahia. Founded in 1918, it is the oldest museum in Bahia and one of the first ten founded in Brazil.

== History ==
The museum was created to preserve the historical and ethnographic heritage of Salvador de Bahia, over time, the museum focused on expanding its catalog of collections in the arts. The museum was founded in 1918. In 1982, the museum moved to the Vitória Palace. The Vitória Palace was formerly used as the headquarters of the Secretary of Education. In 2019, the museum was awarded the medal "Diploma and Medal for Museological Merit" by the Brazilian Regional Museology Council. In 2020, the museum joined the Google Arts & Culture platform, in which an adapted version of Google Street View was added to the museum's interior.

== Collections ==
The museum has 5,000 works of art including religious sculptures, paintings, ceramics, photographs, documents and glass art. The museum contains pieces of decorative arts of Brazilian, Oriental and European origin. The museum includes works of art by Brazilian artists José Teófilo de Jesus, José Joaquim da Rocha, Alberto Valença, Manoel Ignácio de Mendonça Filho and Presciliano Silva. The museum has a library with 12,000 books as well as plastic arts exhibits. The museum also houses collections of the historian Góis Calmon. Among the museum's collections are 19th century tiles and various antiques. In 2017, the museum organized an exhibition of Judite Pimentel's artwork. The museum also has a collection of statues made of marble.

== Gallery ==
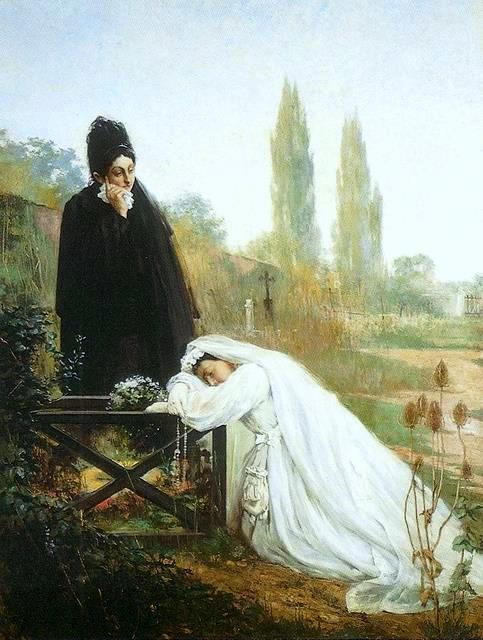

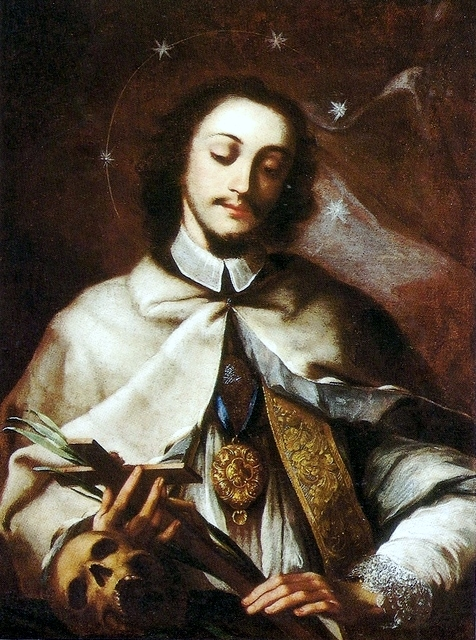

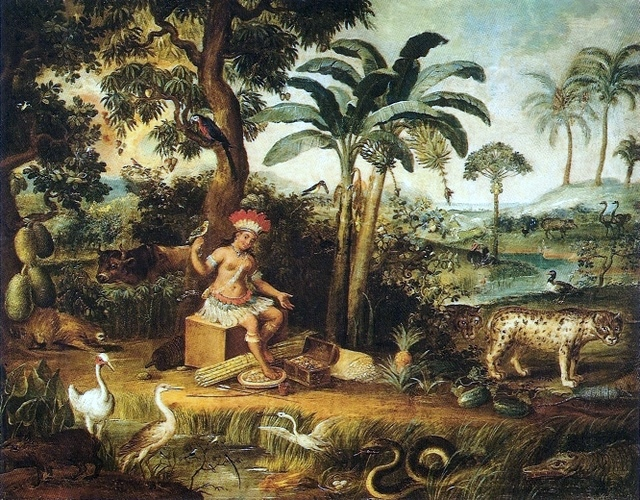
