= Church of Nossa Senhora do Rosário dos Pretos, Salvador =

Roman Catholic church in Bahia, Brazil

Church of the Third Order of Our Lady of the Rosary of the Black People
- Igreja da Ordem Terceira de Nossa Senhora do Rosário dos Pretos
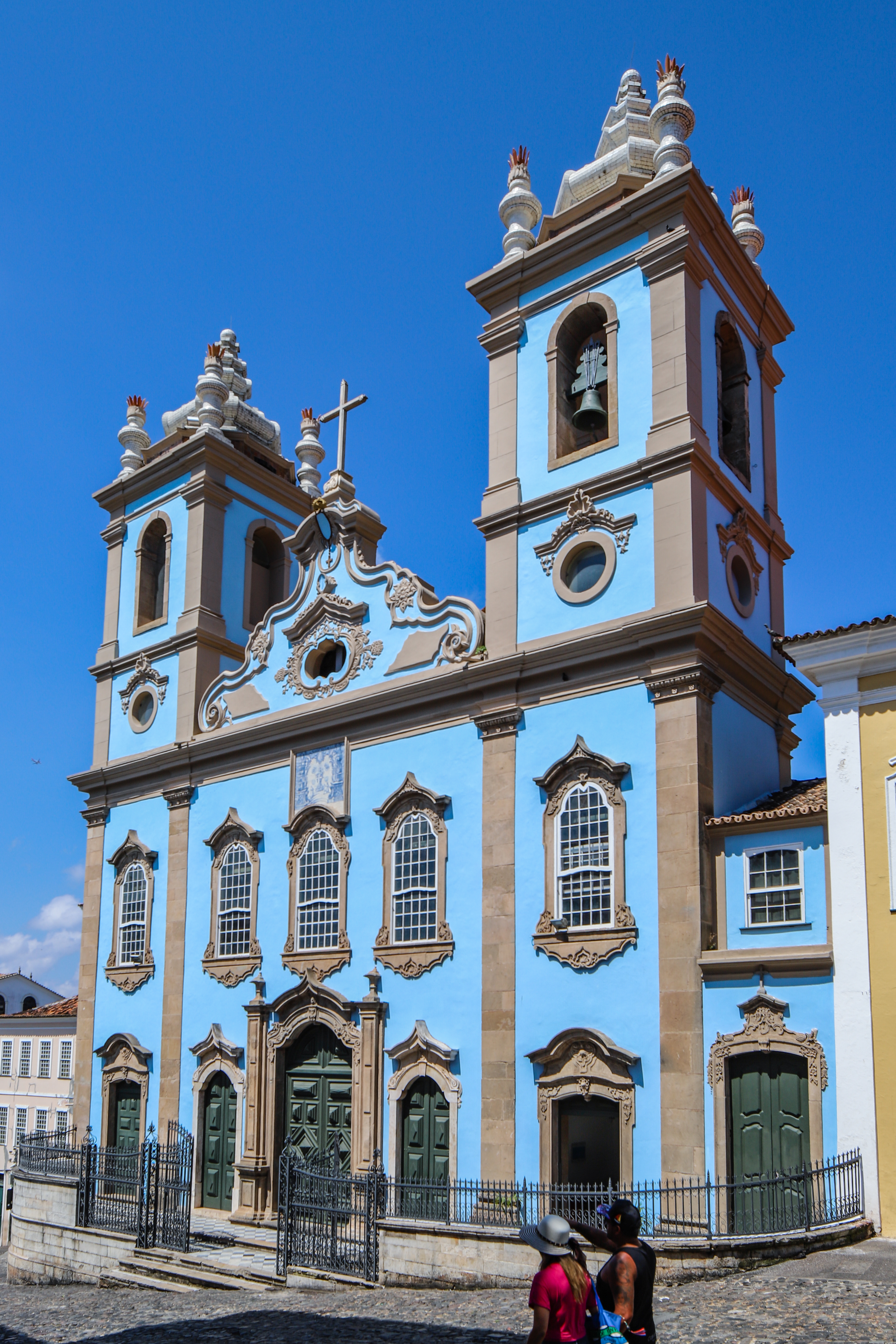
- Church of the Third Order of Our Lady of the Rosary of the Black People in the Pelourinho

- Location of the Church of the Third Order of Our Lady of the Rosary of the Black People in Brazil

Religion
- Affiliation: Catholic
- Rite: Roman

Location
- Municipality: Salvador
- State: Bahia
- Country: Brazil
- Coordinates: 12.969201°S 38.507507°W

Architecture
- Style: Baroque
- Completed: 1709

National Historic Heritage of Brazil
- Designated: 1938
- Reference no.: 82

The Church of the Third Order of Our Lady of the Rosary of the Black People (Portuguese: Igreja da Ordem Terceira de Nossa Senhora do Rosário dos Pretos) is an 18th-century Roman Catholic church in Salvador, Bahia, Brazil. The construction of the church took almost 100 years. It is dedicated to Our Lady of the Rosary and belongs to the Archdiocese of São Salvador da Bahia. The church was listed as a historic structure by National Institute of Historic and Artistic Heritage (IPHAN) in 1938 and is part of the Historic Center of Salvador UNESCO World Heritage Site.

== History ==
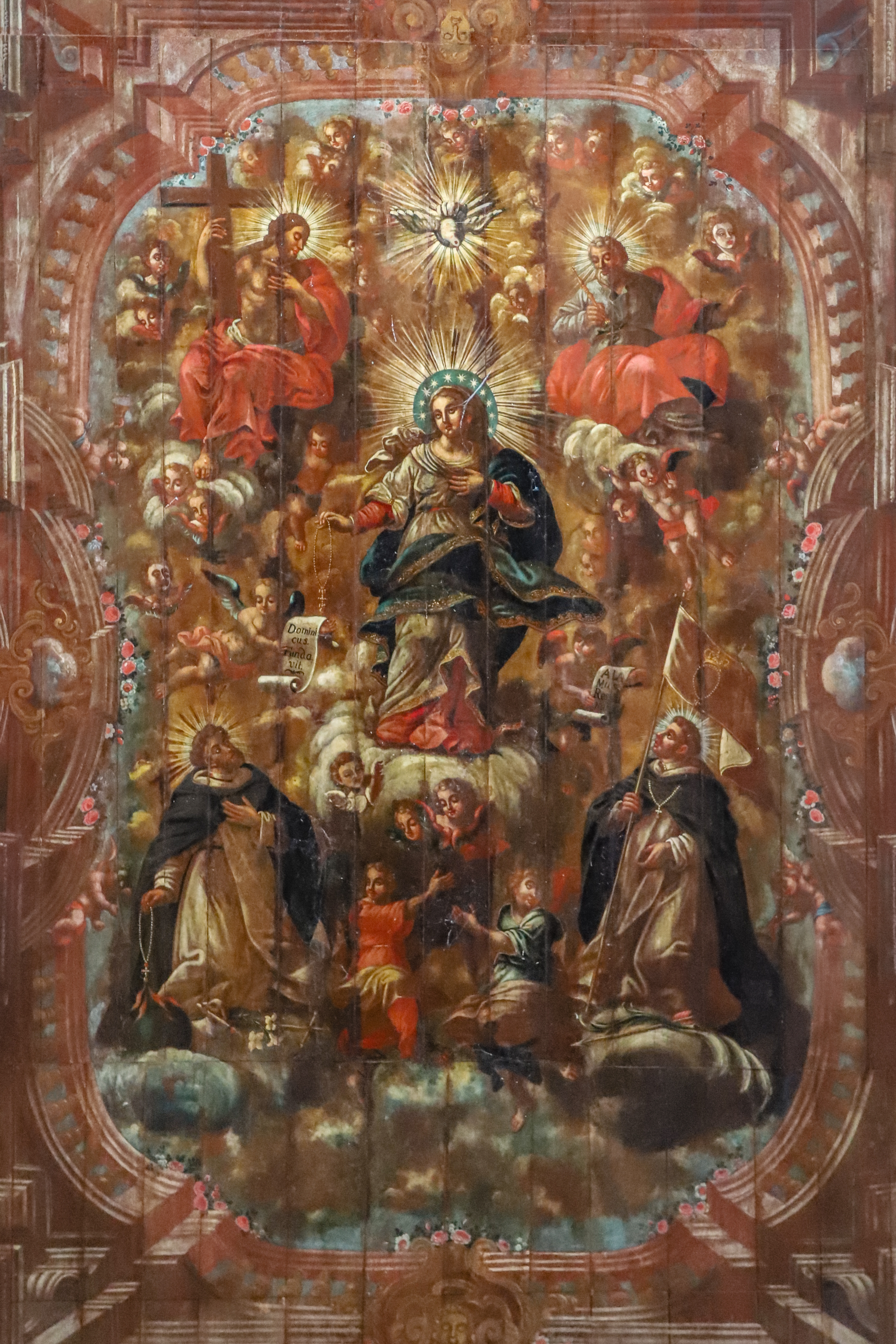
Ceiling painting of the nave

Slaves and freeman, like the Portuguese, organized themselves into brotherhoods, confraternities, or mutual aid societies, known as irmandades or confrarias. Afro-Brazilian brotherhoods began to congregate at the side altars of parish and other churches; the brotherhood in Salvador was known, formally, as the Irmandade de Nossa Senhora do Rósario dos Homens Pretos de Pelourinho. Slaves and freedman worshiped at a side altar of Our Lady of the Rosary in the Basilica of the Immaculate Conception, Salvador from the beginning of the seventeenth century.

The Brotherhood of Our Lady of the Rosary of Salvador first received the consent of the Jesuit provincial João Pereira and statutory confirmation by Archbishop of Salvador da Bahia João da Madre de Deus Araújo (1621–1686) in 1685. Its charter followed that of similar orders established in Olinda (mid-sixteenth century), Rio de Janeiro (mid-seventeenth century), Recife (1654) and Belém do Pará (1682). Our Lady of the Rosary was the subject of particular devotion to slaves and freedmen of African descent in colonial Brazil. Saint Benedict, Saint Ephigenia of Ethiopia, and Saint Elesbão (Saint Kaleb of Axum) were also venerated in the Our Lady of the Rosary churches.

By 1704 the Brotherhood raised sufficient funds to construct a church. The organization petitioned and received permission to build a church from Archbishop Dom Sebastião Monteiro de Vide for the construction of a proper church.

Membership to the Brotherhood was strictly limited by an agreement with the Archbishop to Africans born south of the Equator, referred to as Banto; there were generally from Congo and Mozambique. Membership was extended only to people of Bantu background and their descendants. The Brotherhood petitioned the crown in Lisbon in 1786 to celebrate the mass using "masks, dances in the Angolan language with the relevant instruments, songs, and praises", as was done "in many countries of Christendom." The petition was rejected. Additionally, despite its role in the ministry and social support of Afro-Brazilians, members of the Brotherhood were also slaveholders.

Restriction to membership of the Brotherhood to those of Bantu background led to the establishment of the Brotherhood of Quinze Mistérios (Irmandade do Quinze Mistérios), which accepted only people of Yoruba background. The Brotherhood of Quinze Mistérios subsequently established their own church, the Church of Quinze Mistérios in the 19th century. The distinction in ethnic background became obsolete with the abolition of slavery in Brazil under the Lei Áurea in 1888. Membership to the Brotherhood was and extended to all Brazilians of African descent in 1896.

== Construction ==
Construction of the Church of the Rosary was a slow process and continued for one hundred years. Members of the irmandade were poor and the building was constructed by members of the brotherhood in their free hours: it required the labor of skilled carpenters, masons, and iron workers. From 1718 the church was also the headquarters of the newly created parish of Senhor do Passo, a situation that continued until about 1740. The square church structure of the nave was constructed first. The elaborate façade and church towers followed in 1780 under the direction of Caetano José da Costa.

Two lateral corridors were added in the same period that correspond to the tower structures. The interior of the church was renovated in the late 19th century; two new altars in the Neoclassical style were added, in addition to numerous paintings.

== Location ==
The church is located in the old Rua das Portas do Carmo in a triangular-shaped square. The square emerged from the demolition of the "knight" and a gate that served as a defense to the city. The punishment and execution of slaves dates to the period of Dutch occupation of Brazil. The Dutch hanged 50 slaves accused of espionage for the Spanish.

The Largo do Pelourinho, with its 19th century townhouses, is "one of the most interesting urban spaces in Salvador." The square sits in the middle of the historic center that extends from the Praço de Sé to Passo, first designated by IPHAN, and later as part of the Historic Center of Salvador UNESCO World Heritage Site.

== Structure ==
The Church of the Rosary of the Blacks is an imposing structure accessed from the sloping Rua do Carmo by a patio. The patio, which serves as the churchyard, has a low iron fence. The façade has a central body of two floors, crowned by a pediment of gable wreaths, and flanked by bell towers whose finish has superimposed bulbs covered with tiles. There are five doors at the ground floor. The central door is broad, imposing, and framed by a separate frontispiece. The fifth door, at the base of the right tower, provides access to the oratory; this design is also seen in the church of Santo Antônio Alem do Carmo and the Church of Boqueirão. Above the five doors are five windows of delicate design.

The design of the facade, built after 1780, is attributed to the master craftsman Caetano José da Costa. The frontispiece of the Church of the Rosary is highly complex. It is similar to that of Parish Church of Saint Bartholomew in Maragogipe, constructed in the second half of the 17th century.

The two church towers are in plain stone masonry, in contrast to the blue limestone of the facade. The towers have rectangular belfries with oculi on four sides below the church bell windows. The belfries are surmounted by tiled bulbous structures. Each cornier of the belfry has a stylized torchère.

A graveyard is located to the rear of the church.

== Alterations and additions ==
The renovation of 1870/1871 introduced significant changes to the church. Tribunes of the chancel were altered to become balconies. Conservation works carried out by IPHAN in 1943; the facade was stabilized between 1951 and 1952. The City of Salvador painted the exterior of the church in 1969 without the authorization of the IPHAN. The church was seriously damaged in 1998 when a concrete mixer truck went down Ladeira do Pelourinho uncontrolled and in reverse. It hit the church severely damaged the protective iron railing of the church steps and the right-side portal of the façade. They were subsequently repaired.

== Access ==
The church is open to the public and may be visited.
