= Germain Bazin =

French art historian (1901–1990)

Germain René Michel Bazin (24 September 1901 – 2 May 1990) was a French art historian, curator at the Louvre Museum from 1951 to 1965.

== Life ==
Germain Bazin was born in Suresnes on 24 September 1901. He studied art history at the University of Paris. Bazin became an art professor at the University of Brussels in 1934 before returning to Paris to work at the Louvre in 1936. From 1951 to 1965 he was chief curator of paintings at the Louvre. From 1965 to 1970 he was in charge of painting restoration for France's national museum system. In 1981 he became member of the Royal Academie.

He died 2 May 1990.

== Works ==
- Le Mont-Saint-Michel. Preface by Marcel Aubert. Paris: Auguste Picard, 1933
- La France en guerre. Preface by André Siegfried. Paris: Plon, 1940
- L'époque impressionniste: avec notices biographiques et bibliographiques, Paris: P. Tisné, 1947
- Le Livre des Saisons: Les Trésors de la Peinture Française. Geneva: Skira, 1948
- History of Classic Painting. Translated from the French by Rosamund Frost. New York: Hyperion Press, 1951
- L'Histoire de l’art de la prehistoire à nos jours, 1953
- The Louvre. Translated by M. I. Martin. London: Thames and Hudson, 1957
- A Concise History of Art, Part One: From the Beginnings to the Fifteenth Century, "The World of Art Library" series. London: Thames & Hudson, 1958.
- A Concise History of Art, Part Two: From the Renaissance to the Present Day, "The World of Art Library" series. London: Thames & Hudson, 1958.
- The Loom of Art. Translated by Jonathan Griffin. New York: Simon and Schuster, 1962
- The Museum Age. Translated by Jane van Nuis Cahill. New York: Universe Books 1967
- Histoire de l'avant-garde en peinture de XIIIe au XXe siècle, Paris: Hathette, 1969. Translated by Simon Watson Taylor as The Avant-garde in Painting, New York: Simon & Schuster, 1969.
- The Baroque: Principles, Styles, Modes, Themes. Translation by Pat Wardroper. Greenwich, CT: New York Graphic Society, 1968; Corot. Paris: Hachette, 1973
- Paradeisos: The Art of the Garden Societe Nouvelle des Editions du Chene 1988. Translation Little Brown and Company 1990
- Histoire de l'histoire de l'art: de Vasari à nos jours, Paris: A. Michel, 1986
- Théodore Géricault : étude critique, documents et catalogue raisonné. Paris: La Bibliothèque des arts, 1987-1997
