= Largo do Pelourinho =

Public square in Salvador, Bahia, Brazil

- Praça José de Alencar
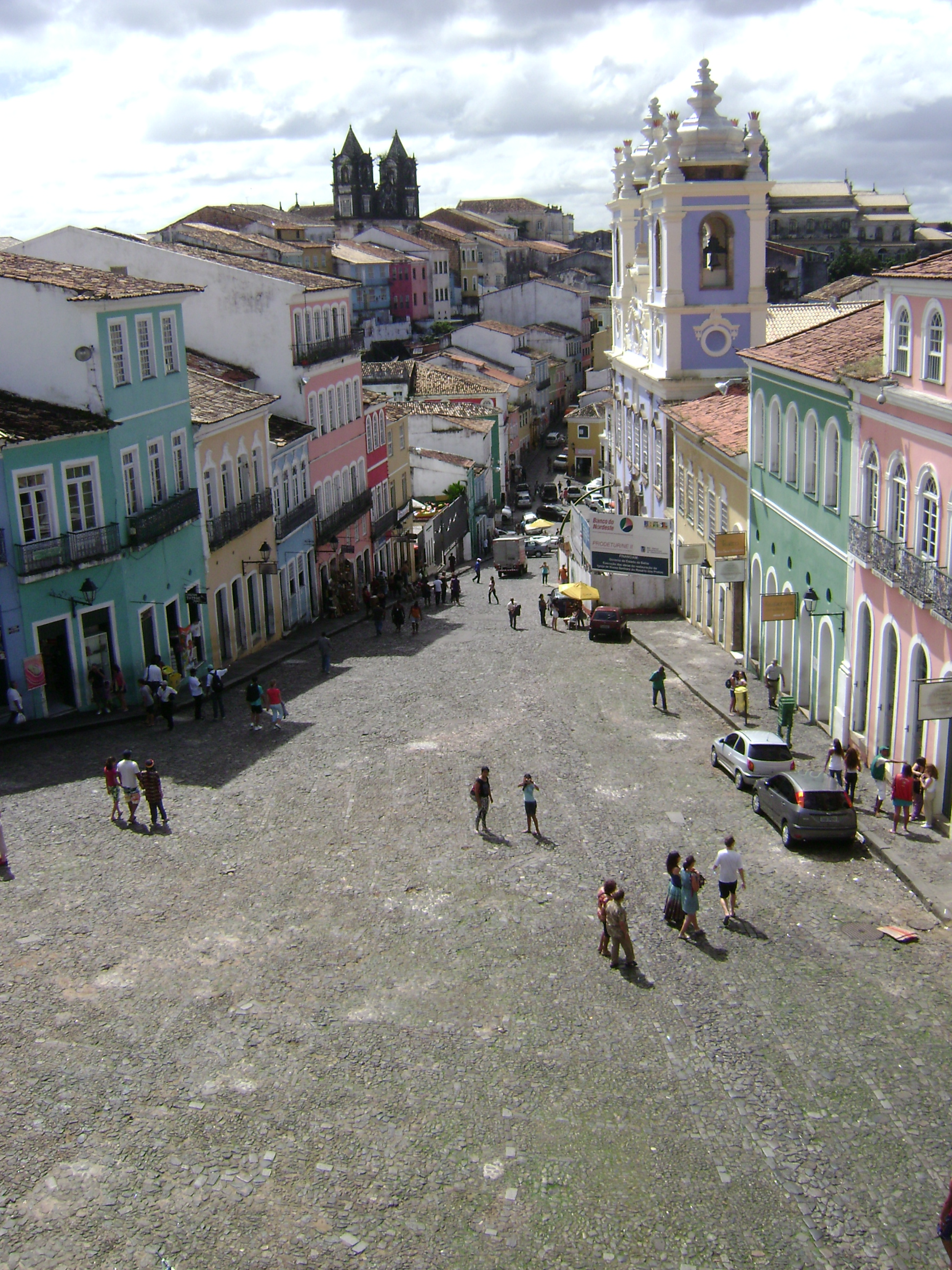
- Aerial view of the lower part of Largo do Pelourinho in 2011, when the Church of Nossa Senhora do Rosário dos Pretos was under construction.
- Location: Salvador, Bahia, Brazil
- Interactive map of Largo do Pelourinho
- Coordinates: 12°58′18″S 38°30′30″W

Largo do Pelourinho (nicknamed Pelô and officially known as Praça José de Alencar) is a public square in the Historic Center neighborhood of Salvador, the capital city of the Brazilian state of Bahia. By extension, the area surrounding it up to Terreiro de Jesus is also known as Pelourinho and forms part of the Historic Center of Salvador (CHS), a protected area recognized as a World Heritage Site by the United Nations Educational, Scientific and Cultural Organization (UNESCO) for its well-preserved Brazilian Baroque colonial architecture.

The term pelourinho refers to a stone pillar, usually located in the center of a square, where criminals were publicly shamed and punished. In colonial Brazil, however, it was mainly used to punish enslaved people, but also freed people. Officially, it is named after José de Alencar, a writer specializing in indigenous themes (author of the trilogy consisting of the novels The Guarani, Iracema, and Ubirajara), Minister of Justice during the Second Empire, and a defender of slavery in Brazil.

== History ==
View of Largo do Pelourinho from the Fundação Casa de Jorge Amado.

The history of the area surrounding the square has its origins in the early urban expansion of Salvador; thus, it is linked to the history of the city itself, founded in 1549 by Tomé de Sousa, Brazil’s first governor-general, who chose the site of what is now Thomé de Souza Square for its strategic location, on high ground, close to the Port of Salvador and featuring a natural barrier formed by a steep rise in the terrain, a veritable wall up to ninety meters high and fifteen kilometers long, which facilitated the city’s defense. The construction of the Jesuit High School, the Old Cathedral of Salvador, and the Jesuit church that gave rise to the city’s current cathedral outside the walled area, beyond the North Gate, spurred urban expansion toward Largo do Pelourinho. In the 17th century, the colonial administration ordered the construction of a new defensive structure, the Fortress of Santa Catarina (Second North Gate), in the Pelourinho area to defend against Dutch and French invasions at that point in the Taboão gorge, where there was a narrow strip of land near the sea. With the wall demolished in 1790 and the 1808 Decree Opening the Ports to Friendly Nations, the mansions in Pelourinho began to grow in size.

It was part of the Freguesia da Sé, and was primarily a residential area, where the finest homes were concentrated until the early 20th century, as well as serving as a commercial and administrative center. Starting in the 1950s, the area surrounding Largo do Pelourinho underwent a severe process of decline, driven by the city’s modernization and the shift of economic activities to other parts of the capital of Bahia. This transformed that part of the Historic Center into a neglected area, which gradually became a low-income residential neighborhood and a hub for the city’s Black culture. This demographic shift transformed the area surrounding Largo do Pelourinho into a predominantly Black neighborhood over the course of the 20th century. It gave rise to cultural and community groups based in the neighborhood that, in the 1980s and 1990s, became important political actors in Brazil’s redemocratization, such as Olodum. Still in the 1980s, the Fundação Casa de Jorge Amado was established there, dedicated to the memory of the writer and his wife, Zélia Gattai and Bahian literature.

Starting in the early 1990s, the Largo area was at the heart of the Historic Center’s revitalization process, which involved the expropriation of residents’ properties to make way for bars, stores, small businesses, and schools, as well as the restoration of building facades and structures.

Largo do Peloruinho is also home to the Museu da Cidade, which opened in 1973, the Casa do Benin, a cultural center opened in 1988 that seeks to reflect the relationship between Bahia and Benin,from which people were trafficked as slaves to this part of Brazil, a forced migration that fostered cultural exchange between the two places, and the Church of Nossa Senhora do Rosário dos Pretos, a Catholic church rooted in brotherhoods that served as a means of integrating Black people into society, since they were not allowed to attend the church of the slave owners; it was an exclusive place of worship for Black Brazilians.

== In popular culture ==
In 1996, American singer Michael Jackson filmed the music video for the song They Don’t Care About Us at Largo do Peloruinho with the band Olodum, directed by filmmaker Spike Lee. During filming, the singer climbed onto one of the mansions, which was later rented by businessman Carlos Alberto. It became known as “Michael Jackson’s House,” and its balcony was turned into a tourist attraction featuring an image of Jackson that remained on site until 2026, when the space was closed.

Following the 2007 film Ó Paí, Ó, two buildings located in the lower part of the square became well-known. One of them is the tenement where, according to the film’s setting, most of the characters lived. The other is the former Bar e Restaurante Ceará, which became known by the name of its fictional owner (Bar de Neusão) and served as the setting for one of the film’s classic scenes, in which several characters dance to the song “I Miss Her” by Olodum.

TV Globo productions have also filmed on location there. Scenes from Gilberto Braga’s soap opera Paraíso Tropical were filmed there in 2007. In 2018, it served as one of the main settings for the soap opera Segundo Sol, written by João Emanuel Carneiro. It was also one of the main settings for the miniseries O Canto da Sereia, based on the book by Nelson Motta and starring Ísis Valverde.

The location was the setting for music videos such as Back in Brazil by British musician Paul McCartney, Mal Acostumbrado by Spanish singer Julio Iglesias, The Obvious Child by American Paul Simon, Me Gusta by Anitta, and Apaixonadinha, by Marília Mendonça featuring Léo Santana and Banda Didá. The place is also mentioned in the songs Menino do Pelô, a song by Daniela Mercury featuring Olodum; Ladeira do Pelô, by Bamdamel; Protesto do Olodum, by Olodum, and Haiti by Gilberto Gil and Caetano Veloso. In 2015, the band Babado Novo recorded the CD and DVD Ao Vivo no Pelourinho, featuring a concert recorded at that venue.
