= Bar de Neuzão =

Bar located in Salvador, Bahia

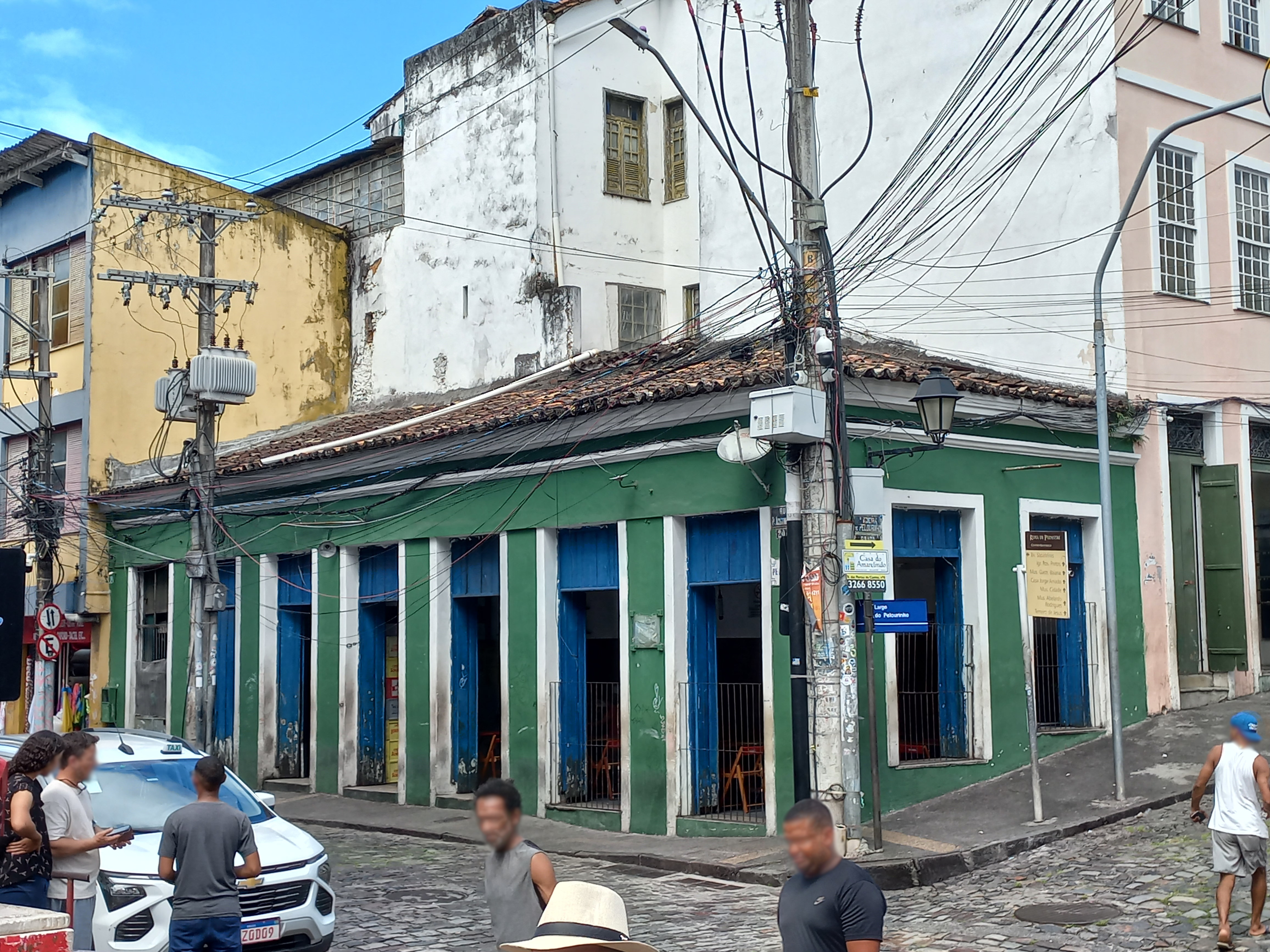
- Bar de Neuzão in 2026

- Location within Brazil

Restaurant information
- Food type: Brazilian
- Location: R. Pe Agostinho Gomes, 20, Salvador, Bahia, Brazil
- Coordinates: 12°58′14.8609″S 38°30′28.1426″W
- Other information: Filming location for Ó Paí, Ó and Ó Paí, Ó 2

Bar de Neuzão is a traditional bar located in Largo do Pelourinho in Salvador, Bahia. The bar became known for being one of the filming locations for the movie O Pai, Ó, directed by Monique Gardenberg and starring Lázaro Ramos and Wagner Moura.

== History ==
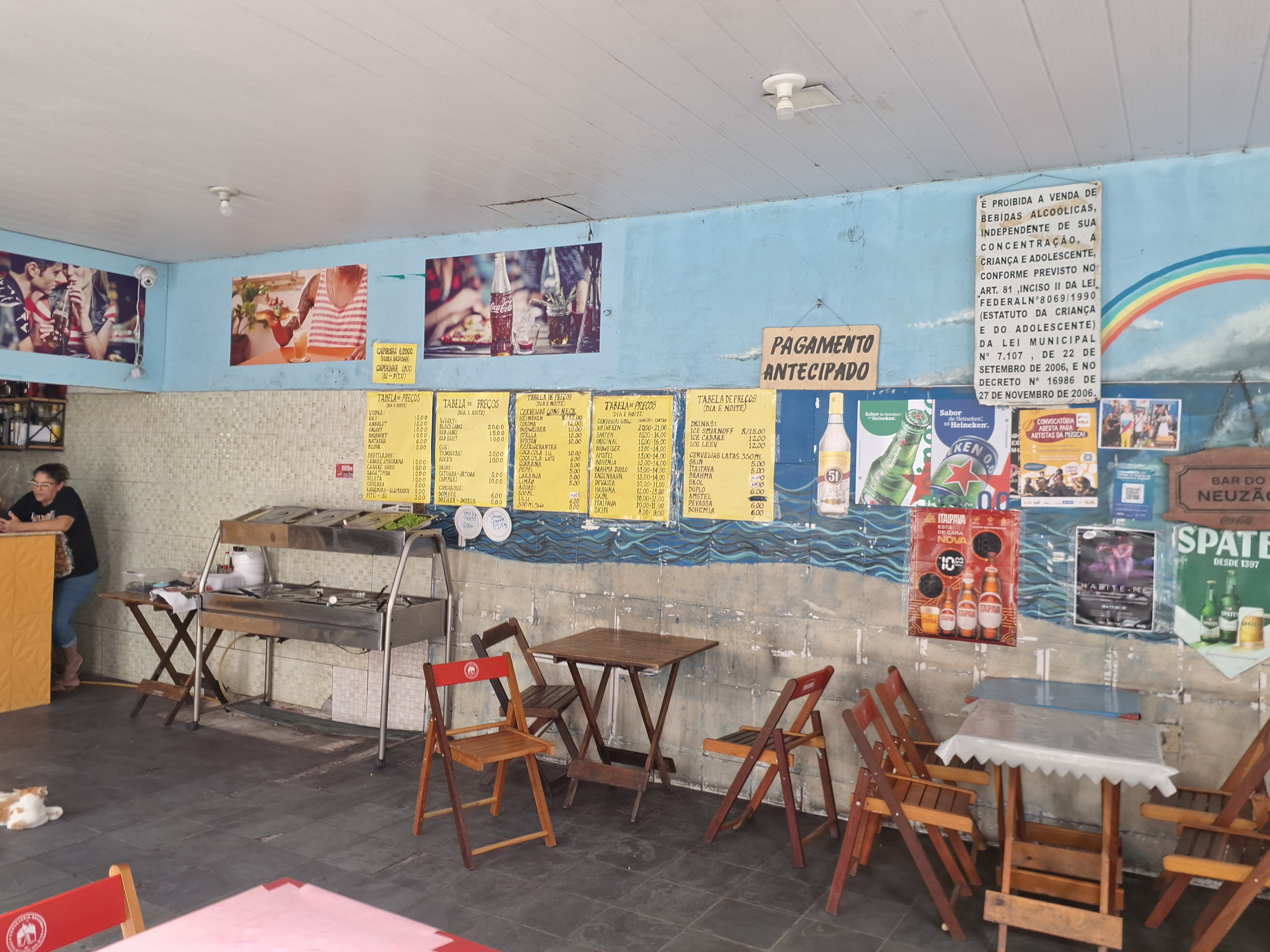
Interior of Neuzão's Bar in 2025

Located at the corner of Rua J.J. Seabra and Baixa do Sapateiro on Padre Agostinho Gomes Street, in Largo do Pelourinho, in the historic center of Salvador, Bahia, Bar do Neuzão is a traditional bar in the capital of Bahia. In addition to selling craft beers and cachaça, the place also serves feijoada, bobó de camarão, caruru, and fried chicken.

The bar gained national fame in Brazil for being one of the filming locations for the movie O Pai, Ó, directed by Monique Gardenberg and starring Lázaro Ramos and Wagner Moura. The bar owner in the movie was played by actress Tânia Toko. Following the 2023 film Ó Paí, Ó 2, directed by Viviane Ferreira and starring Lázaro Ramos and Dira Paes, Neuzão’s bar was once again used as a filming location.
