= Camila de Moraes =

Brazilian film director and journalist

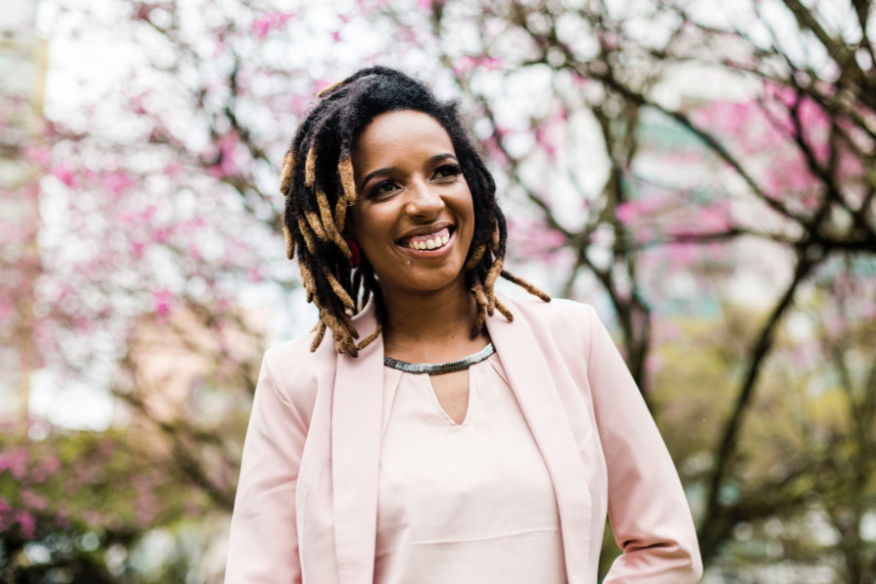
- Moraes in 2019
- Born: April 1988; Porto Alegre, Rio Grande do Sul
- Occupation: Film director
- Notable work: The Case of the Wrong Man

Camila de Moraes (born April 1988) is a Brazilian film director and journalist. Her career in journalism began after graduating from Centro Metodista do Sul in Brazil. She later graduated from the Federal University of Bahia, specialising in audio-visual, and left her career in journalism to become a film director. Moraes has since directed a number of films, including the feature-length documentary O Caso do Homem Errado (The Case of the Wrong Man) and the short film A Escrita do Seu Corpo.

== Early life ==
Camila de Moraes was born in April 1988 in Porto Alegre, Rio Grande do Sul to actress Vera Lopes and poet, writer, journalist and screenwriter Paulo Ricardo de Moraes. According to an interview in Cine Loou in 2021, Moraes is said to have been heavily influenced by her parents' artistic occupations from a young age.

In 2001, at the age of 14, Moraes first visited the capital of Bahia, Salvador, while vacationing with her family. On this vacation, Moraes became captivated by the prominence of the black community within the Bahian capital, having herself grown up in a city where the black community only made up three percent of the population.

Feeling at home in Salvador as a child, Moraes later moved to the Bahian capital during her adulthood and has resided there since.

== Career ==
In 2016, Moraes directed A Escrita do Seu Corpo, a short film centred around gender and racial identity told through poetry.

The following year in 2017, she directed O Caso do Homem Errado (The Case of the Wrong Man), a feature-length documentary about Julio Cesar, a young Brazilian man who was wrongfully accused of committing robbery and shot dead by police in 1987. Cesar was the godfather of Moraes' brother.

The documentary received critical acclaim and was shortlisted for Best Foreign Film at the 2019 Academy Awards, also winning Best Documentary at the Los Angeles Brazilian Film Festival the next year.

After the release of O Case do Homem Errado, Moraes became the second black woman in 36 years to have a film released in a commercial theatre in Brazil. The first being Adelia Sampaio in 1984 with her fiction feature Amor Maldito.

Moraes also co-wrote and produced the documentary Mae de Gay, earning her two Golden Greyhounds at the Gramado Festival.

Moraes is the creator of the Cinema Negro em Acao (Black Film Festival in Action), a film festival that celebrates inclusion and diversity by representing films by black filmmakers.
