= Old Cathedral of Salvador =

Cathedral in Salvador da Bahia, Brazil

Old Cathedral of Salvador (demolished)
- Sé da Bahia (defunct)
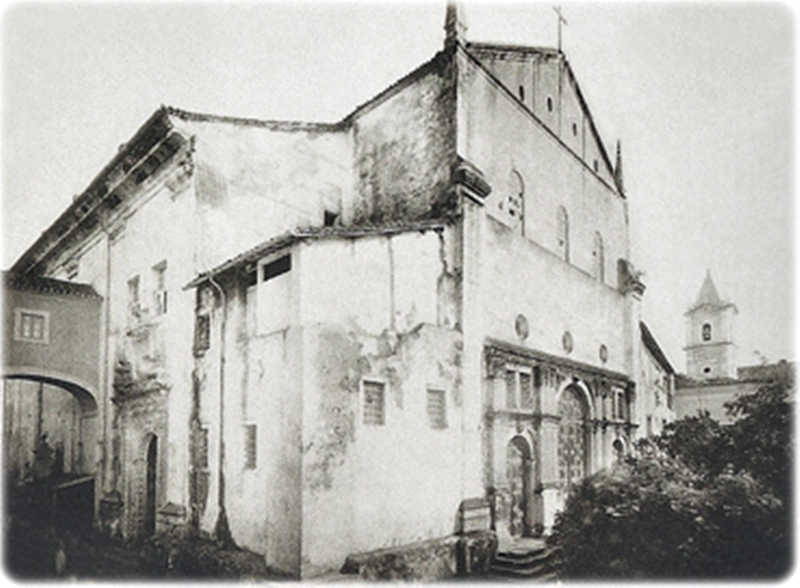

Religion
- Affiliation: Catholic
- Rite: Roman Rite

Location
- Municipality: Salvador
- State: Bahia
- Country: Brazil

Architecture
- Style: Mannerist, Baroque
- Demolished: 1933

The Old Cathedral of Salvador (antiga Sé da Bahia in Portuguese) was the cathedral of the diocese and later archdiocese of Salvador da Bahia, Brazil, from the 16th century until 1765. The seat of the archdiocese moved to the current Cathedral of Salvador. Despite its historical significance, the Old Cathedral was demolished in 1933 under Archbishop Augusto Álvaro da Silva (1876-1968) during a wave of redevelopment in Salvador's historic center. Demolition of the cathedral allowed tram routes to enter into the historic center of the city. The current Cathedral of Salvador is a former Jesuit church.

== History ==
The Diocese of São Salvador da Bahia de Todos os Santos, the first in the Portuguese colony of Brazil, was created in 1551, only two years after the founding of Salvador by nobleman, Tomé de Sousa. The first bishop, Pero Fernandes Sardinha, arrived in 1552 and for several years a small chapel constructed by the Jesuits served as the cathedral.

=== Construction ===
Construction on a new cathedral began during the rule of Tomé de Sousa. This site, outside the walls of Salvador's initial city settlement, was later known as the Terreiro de Jesus because it was dominated by the Jesuit college and church. The exact dates of construction are not known, but in 1570, Governor Mem de Sá wrote that the building was of stone masonry with three naves. Writing in 1587, explorer Gabriel Soares de Souza, described it as "very well constructed and decorated, and two side altars flanking the main chapel."

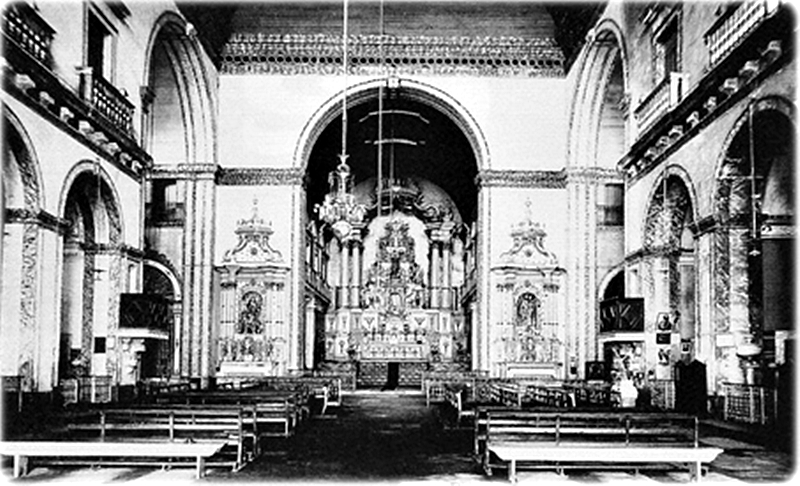
Interior of the Cathedral of Salvador, c. 1930.

Another stage of cathedral construction began on the Old Cathedral of Salvador at the beginning of the 17th century, during the rule of Governor Gaspar de Souza (1612-1617). This building was located on the same site in the Terreiro de Jesus as the previous church, with the facade oriented to face the bay; however, this time the interior was a single nave. During the Dutch Invasion in 1624, the Old Cathedral was used as a military base and was badly damaged when the Portuguese retook the city in 1625. The Diocese was vacant for a decade, recovering its bishop only in 1634 with the arrival of D. Pedro da Silva Sampaio. Starting in 1637, repairs were made on the Old Cathedral to improve its poor condition.

=== Reconstruction ===
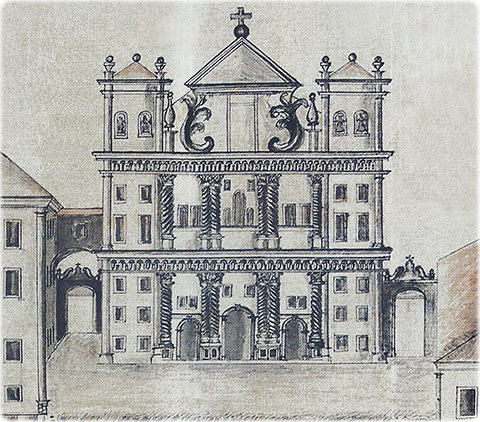
1802 drawing by Luís dos Santos Vilhena showing a hypothetical reconstruction of the Old Cathedral as it may have been in the 18th century.

In the second half of the 17th century, a major reconstruction project began in the Old Cathedral. This was a period when many colonial religious buildings were remade into a larger, more grandiose scale. Unfortunately, documents that record the definitive date or architect for this project do not survive, however, it is probable that the building was designed in Portugal, given the attention that the central government gave to the work of the diocese. The cathedral was large for the period, with a facade flanked by two towers oriented towards the bay. The main structure was completed in the early 18th century, but the internal decorations (altars, floors, paintings, ceiling, etc.) were only completed in the 1730s.

Historical records suggest that throughout the 18th century, the cathedral suffered from neglect. Manuel Cardoso de Saldanha, a Portuguese military engineer and designer of the Church of Nossa Senhora da Conceição da Praia (now the Basilica of the Immaculate Conception), carried out a survey of the building. In 1761, with the Jesuit expulsion from Brazil, their school and church in the Terreiro de Jesus became vacant. In a letter dated 1765, King Joseph I, offered Archbishop Dom José Botelho de Matos, the former Jesuit Church as a temporary site until the cathedral could be restored.

=== Dilapidation ===
By the early 19th century, the Cathedral facade was falling into ruin and its wall was repaired in an attempt to prevent the towers from falling. Nonetheless, the wall itself fell into ruin leading to the preventative demolition of the towers and a great part of the facade masonry. The enormous building, not preserved by ecclesiastical authorities, was transferred to the brotherhood of the Santíssimo Sacramento da Sé (Brotherhood of the Holy Sacrament). The brotherhood did some restoration work including replacing some interior altarpieces.

== Demolition and commemoration ==
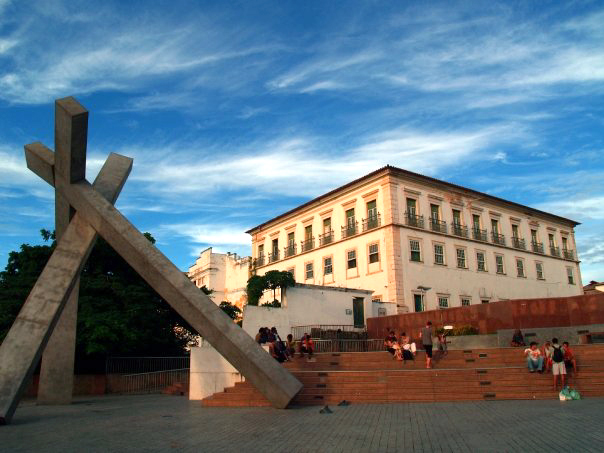
Mário Cravo's sculpture Cruz Caida (Fallen Cross) erected upon the site of the Old Salvador Cathedral in 1999.

On August 7, 1933, after years of debate, the Old Cathedral of Salvador was demolished, along with two other colonial buildings in Salvador's Historic Center, as part of a larger urban renewal project. The destruction of these buildings allowed the extension of tram routes run by the Companhia Linha Circular de Carris da Bahia. Some interior elements of the Old Cathedral were transferred to other Catholic institutions in Salvador; its silver altar was moved to the Convent of Saint Theresa (Convento de Santa Teresa), now the "Museum of Sacred Art of Bahia". The new space created by the demolition of the Old Cathedral was named the Praça da Sé. Initially it served to store the new trolleys.

=== Commemoration ===
In 1956, as homage to the religious and historical significance of the site, city officials erected a bronze bust of Dom Pero Fernandes Sardinha, first Bishop of Brazil and a supporter of the construction of the first cathedral. In 1999, the sculptor Mário Cravo Júnior, erected a stainless steel sculpture Cruz Caída (Fallen Cross) to commemorate the destruction of the historic Cathedral.
