= Carybé =

Argentine-Brazilian artist and historian (1911–1997)

- Born: Héctor Julio Páride Bernabó; 7 February 1911; Lanús, Argentina
- Died: 2 October 1997 (aged 86); Salvador, Bahia, Brazil
- Known for: Painter, engraver, draughtsman, illustrator, potter, sculptor, mural painter, researcher, historian and journalist

Héctor Julio Páride Bernabó (7 February 1911 – 2 October 1997) was an Argentine-Brazilian artist, researcher, writer, historian and journalist. His nickname and artistic name, Carybé, a type of piranha, comes from his time in the scouts. He died of heart failure after the meeting of a candomblé community's lay board of directors, the Cruz Santa Opô Afonjá Society, of which he was a member.

He produced thousands of works, including paintings, drawings, sculptures and sketches. He was an Obá de Xangô, an honorary position at Ilê Axé Opô Afonjá.

== Orixá panels in the Afro-Brazilian Museum in Salvador ==
Some of Carybé's work can be found in the Afro-Brazilian Museum in Salvador: 27 cedar panels representing different orixás or divinities of the Afro-Brazilian religion candomblé. Each panel shows a divinity with their associated implements and animal. The work was commissioned by the former Banco da Bahia S.A., now Banco BBM S.A., which originally installed them in its branch on Avenida Sete de Setembro in 1968.

== Murals at Miami International Airport ==
American Airlines, Odebrecht and the Miami-Dade Aviation Department partnered to install two of Carybé's murals at Miami International Airport. They have been displayed in the American Airlines terminal at John F. Kennedy International Airport in New York since 1960. The 16.5 x 53-foot murals were accredited when Carybé won the first and the second prize in a contest of public art pieces for JFK airport.

As its terminal at that airport was due for demolition, American Airlines donated the murals to Miami-Dade County, and Odebrecht invested in a project to remove, restore, transport and install the murals at Miami International Airport.

The mural "Rejoicing and Festival of the Americas" portrays colorful scenes from popular festivals throughout the Americas, and "Discovery and Settlement of the West" depicts the pioneers’ journey into the American West.

== Carybé's woodcuts in Gabriel García Márquez's books ==
Carybé illustrated four books by the Colombian writer Gabriel García Márquez, including One Hundred Years of Solitude, The Autumn of the Patriarch, Chronicle of a Death Foretold, and Love in the Time of Cholera "Carybé: um mestre da cultura baiana". ArqBahia | Arquitetura, design, arte e lifestyle (in Brazilian Portuguese). 26 April 2023.. In particular, the woodcuts in One Hundred Years of Solitude are well-known for providing a visual image of the fictional town of Macondo, where the story takes place. The illustrations depict the colorful and winding houses, the railway bridge, and the hot and humid climate of the region, contributing to the reader's immersion in the story.

Carybé's woodcuts are, therefore, an important part of Gabriel García Márquez's literary legacy, bringing a visual dimension to his stories that further enriches the reader's experience.

== Timeline ==
- 1911 – Birth in Lanús, Argentina.
- 1919 – Moved to Brazil.
- 1921 – The name Carybé is first given to him by the Clube do Flamengo scouts group, in Rio de Janeiro.
- 1925 – Beginning of his artistic endeavours, going to the pottery workshop of his elder brother, Arnaldo Bernabó, in Rio de Janeiro.
- 1927–1929 – Studies at the National School of Fine Arts, in Rio de Janeiro.
- 1930 – Worked for the newspaper Noticias Gráficas, in Buenos Aires, Argentina.
- 1935–1936 – Works with the writer Julio Cortázar and as a draughtsman for the El Diario newspaper.
- 1938 – Sent to Salvador by newspaper Prégon.
- 1939 – First collective exhibition, with the artist Clemente Moreau, at the Buenos Aires City Museum of Fine Arts, Argentina; illustrates the book Macumba, Relatos de la Tierra Verde, by Bernardo Kardon, published by Tiempo Nuestro.
- 1940 – Illustrates the book Macunaíma, by Mário de Andrade.
- 1941 – Draws the Esso Almanach, the payment for which allows him to set on a long journey through Uruguay, Brazil, Bolivia, and Argentina.
- 1941–1942 – Study trip around several South American countries.
- 1942 – Illustration for the book La Carreta by Henrique Amorim, published by El Ateneo (Buenos Aires, Argentina).
- 1943 – Together with Raul Brié, translates the book Macunaíma, by Mário de Andrade, into Spanish; produces the illustrations for the works Maracatu, Motivos Típicos y Carnavalescos, by Newton Freitas, published by Pigmaleon, Luna Muerta, by Manoel Castilla, published by Schapire, and Amores de Juventud, by Casanova Callabero; also publishes and illustrates Me voy al Norte, for the quarterly magazine Libertad Creadora; awarded First Prize by the Cámara Argentina del Libro (Argentine Book Council) for the illustration of the book Juvenília, by Miguel Cané (Buenos Aires, Argentina).
- 1944 – Illustrates the books The Complete Poetry of Walt Whitmann and A Cabana do Pai Tomás, both published by Schapire; as well as and Los Quatro Gigantes del Alma by Mira y Lopez, Salvador BA; attends capoeira classes, visits candomblé meetings and makes drawings and paintings.
- 1945 – Does the illustrations for Daniel Defoe's Robinson Crusoe, for the Viau publishing house.
- 1946 – Helps in setting up the Tribuna da Imprensa newspaper, in Rio de Janeiro.
- 1947 – Works for the O Diário Carioca newspaper, in Rio de Janeiro.
- 1948 – Produces texts and illustrations for the book Ajtuss, Ediciones Botella al Mar (Buenos Aires, Argentina).
- 1949–1950 – Invited by Carlos Lacerda to work at the Tribuna da Imprensa, in Rio de Janeiro.
- 1950 – Invited by the Education Secretary Anísio Teixeira, moves to Bahia, and produces two panels for the Carneiro Ribeiro Education Center (Park School), in Salvador, Bahia.
- 1950–1997 – Settles in Salvador, Bahia.
- 1950–1960 – Actively participate in the plastic arts renewal movement, alongside Mário Cravo Júnior, Genaro de Carvalho, and Jenner Augusto.
- 1951 – Produces texts and illustrations for the works of the Coleção Recôncavo, published by Tipografia Beneditina and illustrations for the book, Bahia, Imagens da Terra e do Povo, by Odorico Tavares, published by José Olímpio in Rio de Janeiro; for the latter work he receives the gold medal at the 1st Biennial of Books and Graphic Arts.
- 1952 – Makes roughly 1,600 drawings for the scenes of the movie O Cangaceiro, by Lima Barreto; also works as the art director and as an extra on the film (São Paulo, SP).
- 1953 – Illustrations for the book A Borboleta Amarela, by Rubem Braga, published by José Olímpio (Rio de Janeiro, RJ).
- 1955 – Illustrates the work O Torso da Baiana, edited by the Modern Art Museum of Bahia.
- 1957 – Produces etchings, with original designs, for the special edition of Mário de Andrade's Macunaíma, published by the Sociedade dos 100 Bibliófilos do Brasil.
- 1958 – Makes an oil painting mural for the Petrobras Office in New York, US; illustrates the book As Três Mulheres de Xangô, by Zora Seljan, published by Editora G. R. D. (Rio de Janeiro, RJ); Receives a scholarship grant in New York, US.
- 1959 – Takes part in the competition for the New York International Airport panels project, in New York, US, winning first and second prizes.
- 1961 – Illustrates the book Jubiabá, by Jorge Amado, published by Martins Fontes (São Paulo, SP).
- 1963 – Awarded the title of Honorary Citizen of Salvador, Bahia.
- 1965 – Illustrates A Muito Leal e Heróica Cidade de São Sebastião do Rio de Janeiro, published by Raymundo Castro Maya (Rio de Janeiro, RJ).
- 1966 – With Jorge Amado, co-authors Bahia, Boa Terra Bahia, published by Image (Rio de Janeiro, RJ); writes and illustrates the book Olha o Boi, published by Cultrix (São Paulo, SP).
- 1967 – Receives the Odorico Tavares Prize – Best Plastic Artist of 1967, in a competition ran by the state government to stimulate the development of plastic arts in Bahia; makes the Orixás Panels for the Banco da Bahia (currently at the UFBA Afro-Brazilian Museum) (Salvador, BA).
- 1968 – Illustrates the books Carta de Pero Vaz de Caminha ao Rei Dom Manuel, published by Sabiá (Rio de Janeiro) and Capoeira Angolana, by Waldeloir Rego, published by Itapoã (Bahia).
- 1969 – Produces the illustrations for the book Ninguém Escreve ao Coronel, by Gabriel Garcia Marquez, published by Sabiá (Rio de Janeiro, RJ).
- 1970 – Illustrates the books O Enterro do Diabo and Os Funerais de Mamãe Grande, published by Sabiá (Rio de Janeiro, RJ), Agotimé her Legend, by Judith Gleason, published by Grossman Publishers (New York, US).
- 1971 – Illustrates the books One Hundred Years of Solitude, by Gabriel Garcia Marquez and A Casa Verde by Mario Vargas Llosa, both published by Sabiá (Rio de Janeiro, RJ); produces texts and illustrations for the book Candomblé da Bahia, published by Brunner (São Paulo, SP).
- 1973 – Illustrations for Gabriel Garcia Marquez's A Incrível e Triste História de Cândida Erendira e sua Avó Desalmada (Rio de Janeiro, RJ); paints the mural for the Legislative Assembly and the panel for the Bahia State Secretary of the Treasury.
- 1974 – Produces woodcuts for the book Visitações da Bahia, published by Onile.
- 1976 – Illustrates the book O Gato Malhado e a Andorinha Sinhá: uma história de amor, by Jorge Amado (Salvador, BA); receives the title of Knight of the Order of Merit of Bahia.
- 1977 – Certified with the Honor for Afro-Brazilian Cult Spiritual Merit, Xangô das Pedrinhas ao Obá de Xangô Carybé (Magé, RJ).
- 1978 – Makes the concrete sculpture Oxóssi, in the Catacumba Park; illustrates the book A Morte e a Morte de Quincas Berro D´Água, by Jorge Amado, published by Edições Alumbramento (Rio de Janeiro, RJ).
- 1979 – Produces woodcuts for the book Sete Lendas Africanas da Bahia, published by Onile.
- 1980 – Designs the costumes and scenery for the ballet Quincas Berro D´Água, at the Teatro Municipal in Rio de Janeiro.
- 1981 – Publication of the book Iconografia dos Deuses Africanos no Candomblé da Bahia (Ed. Raízes), following thirty years of research.
- 1982 – Receives the title of Honorary Doctor of the Federal University of Bahia.
- 1983 – Makes the panel for the Brazilian Embassy in Lagos, Nigeria.
- 1984 – Receives the Jerônimo Monteiro Commendation – Level of Knight (Espírito Santo); receives the Castro Alves Medal of Merit, granted by the UFBA Academy of Arts and Letters; makes the bronze sculpture Homenagem à mulher baiana (Homage to the Bahian woman), at the Iguatemi Shopping Center (Salvador, BA).
- 1985 – Designs the costumes and sets for the spectacle La Bohème, at the Castro Alves Theater; illustrates the book Lendas Africanas dos Orixás, by Pierre Verger, published by Currupio.
- 1992 – Illustrates the book O sumiço da santa: uma história de feitiçaria, by Jorge Amado (Rio de Janeiro, RJ).
- 1995 – Illustration of the book O uso das plantas na sociedade iorubá, by Pierre Verger (São Paulo, SP).
- 1996 – Making of the short film Capeta Carybé, by Agnaldo Siri Azevedo, adapted from the book O Capeta Carybé, by Jorge Amado, about the artist Carybé, who was born in Argentina and became the most Bahian of all Brazilians.
- 1997 – Illustration of the book Poesias de Castro Alves.

== Exhibitions ==
=== Individual exhibitions ===
- 1943 – Buenos Aires (Argentina) – First individual exhibition, at the Nordiska Gallery
- 1944 – Salta (Argentina) – at the Consejo General de Educacion
- 1945 – Salta (Argentina) – Amigos del Arte, Buenos Aires (Argentina) – Motivos de América, at the Amauta Gallery, Rio de Janeiro RJ – individual exhibition at the IAB/RJ
- 1947 – Salta (Argentina) – Agrupación Cultural Femenina
- 1950 – Salvador BA – First individual exhibit in Bahia, at the Bar Anjo Azul; São Paulo SP – MASP.
- 1952 – São Paulo SP – MAM/SP
- 1954 – Salvador BA – Oxumaré Gallery
- 1957 – New York (US) – Bodley Gallery; Buenos Aires (Argentina) – Bonino Gallery * 1958 - New York (US) – Bodley Gallery
- 1962 – Salvador BA - MAM/BA
- 1963 – Rio de Janeiro RJ – Bonino Gallery
- 1965 – Rio de Janeiro RJ – Bonino Gallery
- 1966 – São Paulo SP – Astrea Gallery
- 1967 – Rio de Janeiro RJ – Santa Rosa Gallery
- 1969 – London (England) – Varig Airlines
- 1970 – Rio de Janeiro RJ – Galeria da Praça
- 1971 – Rio de Janeiro RJ – MAM/RJ, São Paulo SP – A Galeria; Belo Horizonte MG, Brasília DF, Curitiba PR, Florianopolis SC, Porto Alegre RS, Rio de Janeiro RJ and São Paulo SP – The Orixás Panel (exhibition tour), at the Casa da Cultura in Belo Horizonte, MAM/DF, the Public Library of Paraná, the Legislative Assembly of Santa Catarina State, the Legislative Assembly of Rio Grande do Sul, MAM/RJ and MAM/SP
- 1972 – The Orixás Panel in Fortaleza CE – at the Ceará Federal University Art Museum, and in Recife PE – at the Santa Isabel Theater
- 1973 – São Paulo SP – A Galeria
- 1976 – Salvador BA – at the Church of the Nossa Senhora do Carmo Convent
- 1980 – São Paulo SP – A Galeria
- 1981 – Lisbon (Portugal) – Cassino Estoril
- 1982 – São Paulo SP – Renot Art Gallery, São Paulo SP – A Galeria
- 1983 – New York (US) – Iconografia dos Deuses Africanos no Candomblé da Bahia, The Caribbean Cultural Center
- 1984 – Philadelphia (US) – Art Institute of Philadelphia; Mexico – Museo Nacional de Las Culturas; São Paulo SP – Galeria de Arte André
- 1986 – Lisbon (Portugal) – Cassino Estoril; Salvador BA – As Artes de Carybé, Núcleo de Artes Desenbanco
- 1989 – Lisbon (Portugal) – Cassino Estoril; São Paulo SP – MASP
- 1995 – São Paulo SP – Documenta Galeria de Arte, São Paulo SP – Casa das Artes Galeria, Campinas SP – Galeria Croqui, Curitiba PR – Galeria de Arte Fraletti e Rubbo, Belo Horizonte MG – Nuance Galeria de Arte, Foz do Iguaçu PR – Ita Galeria de Arte, Porto Alegre RS – Bublitz Decaedro Galeria de Artes, Cuiabá MT – Só Vi Arte Galeria, Goiânia GO – Época Galeria de Arte, São Paulo SP – Artebela Galeria Arte Molduras, Fortaleza CE – Galeria Casa D'Arte, Salvador BA – Oxum Casa de Arte

=== Collective exhibitions ===
- 1939 – Buenos Aires (Argentina) – Carybé and Clemente Moreau Exhibition, at the Museo Municipal de Belas Artes
- 1943 – Buenos Aires (Argentina) – 29th Salon de Acuarelistas y Grabadores – first prize
- 1946 – Buenos Aires (Argentina) – Drawings by Argentine Artists, at the Kraft Gallery
- 1948 – Washington (US) – Artists of Argentina, at the Pan American Union Gallery
- 1949 – Buenos Aires (Argentina) – Carybé and Gertrudis Chale, at the Viau Gallery; Salvador BA – Bahian Showroom of Fine Arts, at the Hotel Bahia
- 1950 – Salvador BA – 2nd Bahian Showroom of Fine Arts; São Paulo SP – MAM/SP
- 1951 – São Paulo SP – 1st São Paulo Art Biennial, Trianon Pavilion.
- 1952 – Salvador BA – 3rd Bahian Showroom of Fine Arts, at Belvedere da Sé; São Paulo SP – MAM/SP
- 1953 – Recife PE – Mario Cravo Júnior and Carybé, at the Santa Isabel Theater; São Paulo SP – 2nd São Paulo Art Biennial, at MAM/SP
- 1954 – Salvador BA – 4th Bahian Showroom of Fine Arts, at the Hotel Bahia. – Bronze medal
- 1955 – São Paulo SP – 3rd São Paulo Art Biennial, at MAM/SP – first prize for drawing
- 1956 – Salvador BA – Modern Artists of Bahia, at the Oxumaré Gallery; Venice (Italy) – 28th Venice Biennial
- 1957 – Rio de Janeiro RJ – 6th National Modern Art Show – exemption from the jury; São Paulo SP – Artists from Bahia, at the MAM/SP
- 1958 – San Francisco (US) – Works by Brazilian Artists, at the Fine Arts Museums of San Francisco, Washington and New York (US) – Works by Brazilian Artists, at the Pan American Union and the MoMA
- 1959 – Seattle (US) – 30th International Exhibition, at the Seattle Art Museum; Salvador BA – Modern Artists of Bahia, at the Dentistry School.
- 1961 – São Paulo SP – 6th São Paulo Art Biennial, at MAM/SP – special room
- 1963 – Lagos (Nigeria) – Brazilian Contemporary Artists, at the Nigerian Museum; São Paulo SP – 7th São Paulo Art Biennial Bienal, at the Fundação Bienal
- 1964 – Salvador BA – Christmas Exhibition, at the Galeria Querino
- 1966 – Baghdad (Iraq) – collective exhibition sponsored by the Calouste Gulbenkian Foundation; Madrid (Spain) – Artists of Bahia, at the Hispanic Culture Institute; Rome (Italy) – Piero Cartona Palace; Salvador BA – 1st National Biennial of Plastic Arts (Bienal da Bahia) – special room; Salvador BA – Draughtsmen of Bahia, at the Convivium Gallery
- 1967 – Salvador BA – Christmas Exhibition at the Panorama Art Gallery; São Paulo SP – Artists of Bahia, at the A Gallery
- 1968 – São Paulo SP – Bahian Artists, at the A Gallery
- 1969 – London (England) – Tryon Gallery; São Paulo SP – 1st Panorama of Current Brazilian Art at the MAM/SP; São Paulo SP – Carybé, Carlos Bastos and Mario Cravo Jr., at the Portal Art Gallery.
- 1970 – Liverpool (England) – 12 Contemporary Brazilian Artists, at Liverpool University; Rio de Janeiro RJ – Painters from Bahia at the Marte 21 Gallery; Reopening Exhibition for the Panorama Art Gallery; Porto Alegre RS – São Paulo Modern Art Museum Collection, at the UFRGS Art School; São Paulo SP – Christmas Exhibition, at the Irlandini Gallery
- 1971 – São Paulo SP – 11th São Paulo Art Biennial, at the Fundação Bienal – special room; São Paulo SP – 3rd Panorama of Current Brazilian Art, at MAM/SP
- 1972 – São Paulo SP – Art/Brazil/Today: 50 years later, at the Galeria da Collectio; Recife PE – Bahian Art Today, at the Hotel Miramar; São Paulo SP - 50 Years of Modern Art in Brazil, at the A Gallery
- 1973 – Salvador BA – 150 Years of Painting in Bahia, at MAM/BA; São Paulo SP – 12th São Paulo Art Biennial, at the Fundação Bienal – special room; Tokyo, Atami, Osaka (Japan), São Paulo SP, Rio de Janeiro RJ and Brasília DF – 1st Brazil-Japan Fine Arts Exhibition – gold medal; São Paulo SP – Carybé and Ramiro Bernabó, at the A Gallery; Belo Horizonte MG – Jorge Amado and the Artists of Teresa Batista Cansada de Guerra, at the Ami Art Gallery
- 1974 – Salvador BA – Plastic Arts of Bahia; Salvador BA – Art Exhibition Room of the Bahia Engineering Club
- 1975 – Rio de Janeiro RJ – Carybé and Aldemir Martins, at the Mini Gallery; Salvador BA – The Bahia Fair; Tokyo, Atami, Osaka (Japan), São Paulo SP, Rio de Janeiro RJ and Brasília DF – 2nd Brazil-Japan Fine Arts Exhibition
- 1976 – São Paulo SP - Carybé and Preti, at the Grifo Art Gallery; São Paulo SP – Art Show, Grupo Financeiro BBI; Tokyo, Atami, Osaka (Japan), São Paulo SP, Rio de Janeiro RJ and Brasília DF – 3rd Brazil – Japan Fine Arts Exhibition
- 1979 – São Paulo SP – 15th São Paulo Art Biennial, at the Fundação Bienal; Tokyo, Kyoto, Atami (Japan), Rio de Janeiro RJ and São Paulo SP – 4th Brazil-Japan Fine Arts Exhibition
- 1980 – Dakar (Senegal) – Bahian Painters; São Paulo SP – Econtemporary Art Exhibition, at the Chapel Art Show; Lisbon (Portugal) – Bahia Week, at the Cassino Estoril; Fortaleza CE – 11 Artists from Bahia, at Ceará Federal University; Salvador BA – Engravings of the Antonio Celestino Collection, at the Carlos Costa Pinto Museum; Penápolis SP – 4th Northeastern Plastic Arts Exhibition, at the Penápolis Arts Foundation – guest artist
- 1981 – Nekai, Tokyo, Kyoto, Atami (Japan), Brasília DF, Rio de Janeiro RJ and São Paulo SP – 5th Brazil-Japan Fine Arts Exhibition
- 1982 – Salvador BA – Brazilian Art of the Odorico Tavares Collection, at the Carlos Costa Pinto Museum; Brasília DF – Three Artists from Bahia, at the Centro Cultural Thomas Jefferson
- 1983 – Salvador BA – Artistas Amigos do Bistrô do Luiz (Artist Friends of Luiz's Bistro)
- 1984 – Salvador BA – Influência de Mãe Menininha do Gantois na Cultura Baiana (The influence of Mãe Menininha do Gantois on Brazilian Culture), at the Bahia Art Museum; Fortaleza CE – Artists from Bahia, at the Edson Queiroz University Foundation; Dakar (Senegal) – Artists from Bahia, at the National Gallery; Aracajú SE – Bahian Artists Collective, at the J. Inácio Art Gallery, São Paulo SP – Tradition and Rupture: The synthesis of art and Brazilian culture, at the Fundação Bienal
- 1985 – San José (Costa Rica) – Bahian Art Collective, at Galeria 2.000; São Paulo SP - 100 Itaú Works, at MASP
- 1986 – Brasília DF – Bahians in Brasília, at Casa da Manchete
- 1986 – Curitiba PR – An Artist Gifts the city, at the Solar do Barão
- 1986 – Salvador BA - 39 Drawings of the Recôncavo Collection, at the Bahia Art Museum
- 1987 – Salvador BA – Twelve Brazilian Artists, at the Anarte Gallery
- 1987 – São Paulo SP – 20th Contemporary Art Exhibition, at the Chapel Art Show
- 1988 – Salvador BA – The illustrated works of Jorge Amado, at the Fundação Casa de Jorge Amado
- 1988 – São Paulo SP - 15 Years of the Brazil-Japan Fine Arts Exhibition, at the Mokiti Okada Foundation
- 1988 – São Paulo SP – Rhythms and Shapes: contemporary Brazilian art, at Sesc Pompéia
- 1989 – Copenhagen (Denmark) – Rhythms and Shapes: contemporary Brazilian art, Charlottenborg Museum
- 1992 – Santo André SP – Litho engraving: methods and concepts, at the Paço Municipal; Zurich (Switzerland) - Brasilien: Entdeckung und Selbstentdeckung, at the Kunsthaus Zürich
- 1994 – São Paulo SP – Engraving: subtleties and mysteries, printing techniques, at the State Pinacoteca.
- 1996 – São Paulo SP - Norfest 96: Visual Arts, at D&D Shopping
- 1998 – São Paulo SP - Prints: the art of Brazilian engraving, at the Espaço Cultural Banespa-Paulista; São Paulo SP – Seascapes in Great São Paulo Collections, at the Espaço Cultural da Marinha
- 1999 – Rio de Janeiro RJ – Mostra Rio Gravura. Modern Brazilian Engraving: the National Fine Arts Museum Collection.
- 1999 – Salvador BA - 100 Plastic Artists from Bahia, at the Museu de Arte Sacra
- 1999 – São Paulo SP – The Reconsecration of Art, at Sesc Pompéia
- 1999 – São Paulo SP - Cotidiano/Arte. O Consumo – Paratodos (Everyday/Art. Consumption – Forall), at the Itaú Cultural Center
- 1999 – São Paulo SP - Cotidiano/Arte. O Consumo – Metamorfose do Consumo (Everyday/Art. Consumption – Metamorphosis of Consumption), at the Itaú Cultural Center
- 2000 – São Paulo SP - Brazil + 500 Exhibition of the Rediscovery, at the Fundação Bienal
- 2001 – Rio de Janeiro RJ - Aquarela Brasileira, at the Centro Cultural Light
- 2001 – São Paulo SP - 4 Decades, at the André Art Gallery
- 2001 – São Paulo SP – Figures and Faces, at the A Gallery

== Collections ==
- Banco Itaú Collection – São Paulo SP
- Modern Art Center of the Calouste Gulbenkian Foundation – Lisbon (Portugal)
- Raymundo de Castro Maya Foundation – Rio de Janeiro RJ
- MAM – Salvador BA
- MAM – São Paulo SP
- MoMA – New York (US)
- Afro Brazilian Museum – Salvador BA
- The City Museum – Salvador BA
- National Contemporary Art Museum – Lisbon (Portugal)
- Bahia Art Museum – Salvador BA
- Casa da Manchete – Rio de Janeiro RJ
- Museum Rade – Reinbek (Germany)
- Núcleo de Artes do Desenbanco – Salvador BA
- Pinacoteca Ruben Berta – Porto Alegre RS

== "Nureyev" designs by Carybé ==
"Thanks to choreographers Gerry Maretski and Hector Zaraspe, I was able to watch Nureyev's rehearsals in Rio de Janeiro's Municipal Theater, April 1971.

The dancer was rehearsing Stravinsky's 'Apollon Musagéte'. Patiently meshing with the musicians, he repeated parts, argued with the orchestra leader and perfected his rhythms and movements. Then, he began all over again until music and movement coincided with mathematical precision in such perfect coordination that you could not tell whether a note signaled a step or whether it was Nureyev's body that struck the notes.

During those two days, I too worked exhaustively trying to catch the weightlessness and harmony of this man who seemed to fly. I made dozens of drawings which were assembled in an album as a tribute to Apollo's Muses. For if there was anything mythological about the performance, it was Nureyev himself shot into the air by the triggers of his feet and returned to earth with the lightness of a feather."

== Tributes ==
In O Capeta Carybé, Jorge Amado tells numerous stories about Carybé, including: survival adventures, marriage, wanderings from Buenos Aires, in his homeland, to Bahia. Throughout his works, Carybé portrayed traditional Brazilian scenes and settings, such as fishing villages, ballerinas, exits from the church and cowboys taking a break. That is why Jorge Amado refers to Carybé as "a remarkable example in his art, who recreates the reality of the country and the popular life that he knew like very few others, for having lived it like no other."
