= Viviane Ferreira =

Brazilian filmmaker

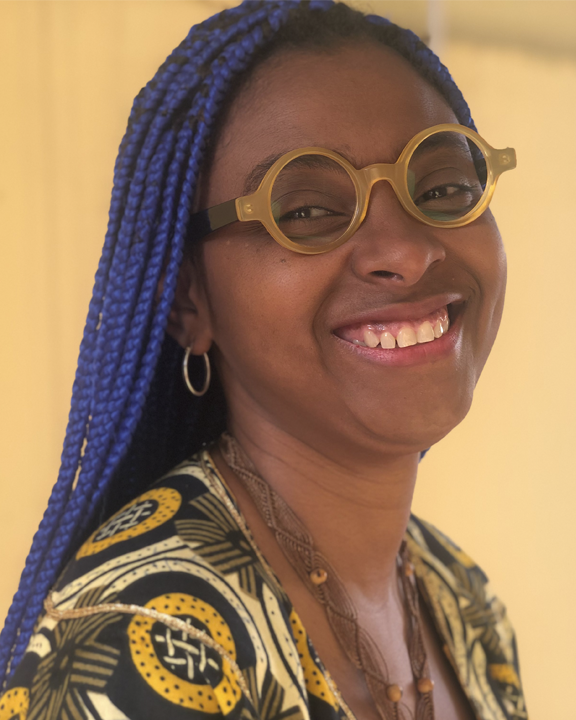
- Viviane Ferreira
- Born: 1985 (age 39–40); Salvador, Brazil
- Occupation(s): Film director, producer, screenwriter
- Years active: 2008–present

Viviane Ferreira (born in Salvador in 1985) is a Brazilian director, screenwriter and producer. She is also a lawyer and an activist of the Black movement and founder of Odun Filmes. She is also president and co-founder of the Brazilian Association of Black Audiovisual Professionals (APAN). Her film O Dia de Jerusa (2014), starring Léa Garcia, was shown at the Short Film Corner at the Cannes Film Festival. The short was transformed into the feature A Day With Jerusa (2020) and with it Viviane became only the second black woman to direct a fiction feature film in Brazil, the first being Adélia Sampaio.

== Biography ==
Viviane was born in the neighborhood of Coqueiro Grande, Salvador, Bahia. She moved to São Paulo at the age of 19 and has been living there since. She graduated in Film at the Stanislavsky Film School and Institute and in Law at the Universidade Paulista - UNIP, specializing in Public Law with focus on Copyright. She did her master's in Communication and Culture Policies at the University of Brasília (UnB).

In 2008, she made her first documentary short, Dê Sua Ideia, Debata. In that same year she founded Odun Filmes, a production company dedicated to identities in the audiovisual, cultural and educational production.

Born in the periphery, she combines her education as a lawyer and as a filmmaker through Black activism. She participated in the youth collective of Ceafro (an organization of Black women in Salvador), and was president of the Associação Mulheres de Odun, an organization for Black feminism, until 2017.

In 2014, her short film O Dia de Jerusa was screened at the Cannes Film Festival.

In 2020, Viviane became the second black woman in Brazil to individually direct a feature film, being preceded by Adélia Sampaio with Amor Maldito in 1984. Her feature, A Day With Jerusa (2020) was nominated for Best Feature Film at the 23rd edition of the Tiradentes Film Festival. Based on her 2014 short documentary, the film addresses themes such as loneliness and the ancestry of black women through the encounter of characters from different generations. The entire cast of the film is made up of Black actors.

Viviane was president of the 2021 Brazilian Academy Awards Selection Committee that submitted the documentary Babenco: Tell Me When I Die to represent Brazil in the Academy Award for Best International Feature Film. However, the film was not chosen by the Academy.

== Filmography ==
Filmography
Year	Title	Director	Screenwriter	Producer	Notes
2008	Dê Sua Ideia, Debata	Yes	Yes	Yes	Documentary Short
2009	XIII Marcha Noturna	Yes	Yes	Yes	Documentary Short
2009	Festa da Mãe Negra	Yes	Yes	Yes	Documentary Short
2010	Mumbi7Cenas pós Burkina	Yes	Yes	Yes	Experimental Short
2011	Jennifer	No	No	Yes	Fiction Short
2012	Samba de Cururuquara	No	No	Yes	Documentary Short
2014	O Dia de Jerusa	Yes	Yes	Yes	Fiction Short Official Selection: Cannes Film Festival (Short Film Corner)
2014	Peregrinação	Yes	Yes	Yes	Documentary Short
2017	O Som do Silêncio	No	No	Yes	Fiction Short
2017	Dara a Primeira Vez Que Foi ao Céu	No	No	Yes	Fiction Short Co-production: Dandara Produções
2018	Simone: Estórias em Estação de Transferência	No	No	Yes	Fiction Short Co-production: Dandara Produções
2019	Mato Adentro	No	No	Yes	Curta ficcional
2019	Pessoas - contar para viver	Yes	Yes	No	Segment: "Esquinas"
2020	Um Dia com Jerusa (A Day With Jerusa)	Yes	Yes	Yes	First Feature Film Nominated as Best Feature Film at the 23rd Tiradentes Film Festival
