= Church of the Third Order of Penitence of Saint Dominic of Osma =

Roman Catholic church in Bahia, Brazil

- Igreja da Ordem Terceira da Penitência de São Domingos de Gusmão
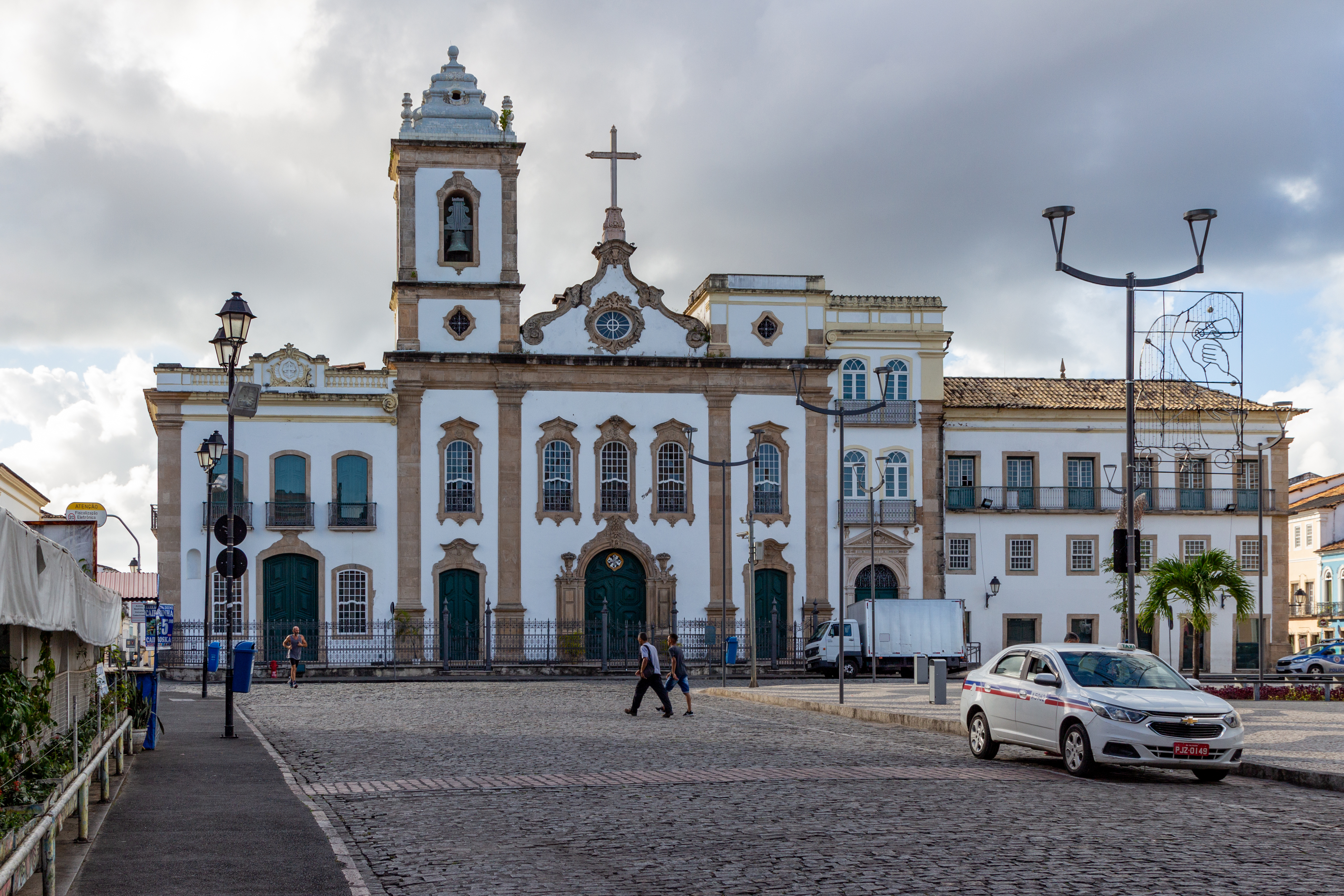
- View of the Church of the Third Order of Penitence of Saint Dominic of Osma

- Location of the Church of the Third Order of Penitence of Saint Dominic of Osma in Brazil Church of the Third Order of Penitence of Saint Dominic of Osma (South America)

Religion
- Affiliation: Catholic
- Rite: Roman
- Ownership: Roman Catholic Archdiocese of São Salvador da Bahia

Location
- Municipality: Salvador
- State: Bahia
- Country: Brazil
- Interactive map of Church of the Third Order of Penitence of Saint Dominic of Osma
- Coordinates: 12.973391°S 38.509343°W

Architecture
- Style: Baroque
- Established: 1800s
- Direction of façade: North-west

National Historic Heritage of Brazil
- Designated: 1938
- Reference no.: 83

The Church of the Third Order of Penitence of Saint Dominic of Osma (Portuguese: Igreja da Ordem Terceira da Penitência de São Domingos de Gusmão, Portuguese: Igreja e Casa da Ordem Terceira de São Domingos) is an 18th-century Roman Catholic church in Salvador, Bahia, Brazil. The church is dedicated to Saint Dominic, a Castilian priest and founder of the Dominican Order. It belongs to the Roman Catholic Archdiocese of São Salvador da Bahia. It occupies the north-west perimeter of the Terreiro de Jesus, opposite the Cathedral Basilica of Salvador. The church was listed as a historic structure by the National Historic and Artistic Heritage Institute in 1938.

== Location ==
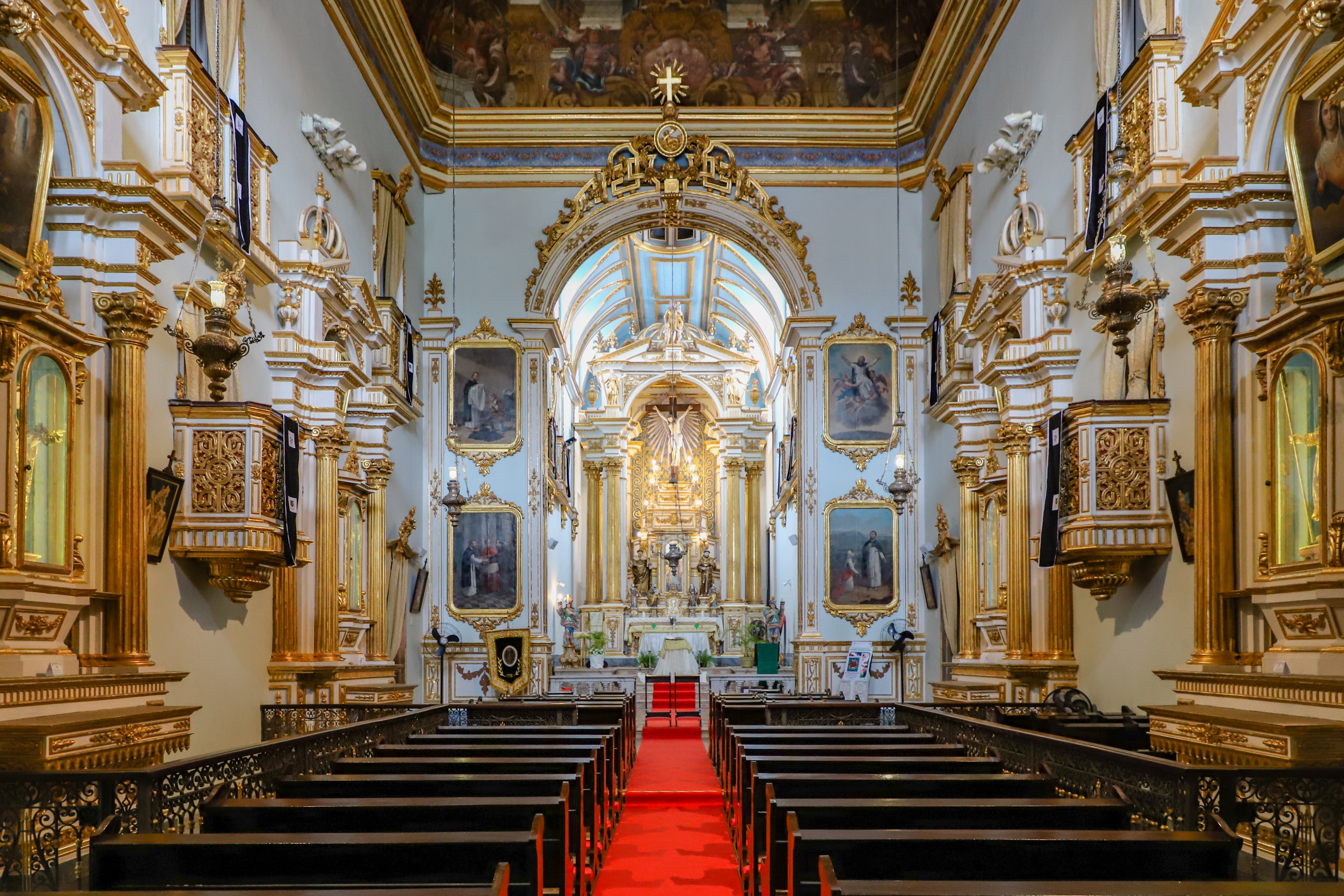
View of nave and chancel

The Church of the Third Order of Penitence of Saint Dominic occupies the north-west perimeter of the Terreiro de Jesus. The Church of Saint Peter of the Clergymen sits to the left of the Third Order church on the Terreiro de Jesus; the Cathedral of Salvador is located on the opposite end of the square.

== History ==
The Bahian chapter of the Brotherhood of the Third Order of Saint Dominic was founded on October 30, 1723. Membership to the Third Order, as with other Carmelite and Franciscan Third Orders, was limited to citizens of pure Portuguese descent, and excluded those of Jewish, Moorish, or African descent; of "an impeccable moral record"; of financial means to support the Brotherhood; and after 1759, not a member of the Society of Jesus. Vasco Fernandes César de Meneses (1673–1741), Viceroy of Brazil, was present at the inaugural ceremony, and was admitted to the order on the same day. The Brotherhood had its first headquarters in the Church and Monastery of Saint Benedict; it soon transferred to the Hospício da Palma. The Third Order had two religious festivals: the patron's saint day of Saint Dominic and the festival of Our Lady of the Rosary in October.

Construction of the seat of the Brotherhood on the Terreiro de Jesus was carried out by João Antunes dos Reis. The church was built and decorated in a short, uninterrupted period of time between 1730 and 1747; the lack of delays in the construction of the church is in contrast to other churches of the period, and to the economic strength of the brotherhood.

The structure had a monumental nave, novitiate, and sacristy. Antônio Mendes da Silva carved an elaborate retable in the chancel between 1745 and 1748. Joaquim José da Rocha (c. 1737–1807) completed the Baroque trompe-l'œil ceiling painting of the nave in the 18th century; it survived subsequent renovations of the structure. The relationship between the Third Order of Saint Dominic and the Third Order of Saint Francis was initially "cordial", but fell into a dispute over properties in the mid-18th century. The Third Order of Saint Dominic attempted to purchase three houses from the Franciscans to expand its headquarters; the sale fell into dispute and was only settled in 1781. The austere House of Saints (Casa dos Santos) was completed in the same year.

The Third Order planned the construction of a carved frontispiece in Portugal. After many difficulties, the idea was abandoned and the current frontispiece was installed in 1787. The wealth of the Third Order is reflected in the elaborate decoration and use of jacaranda throughout the building.

The interior of the church was greatly altered beginning in 1873, most notably in the chancel. The baroque-style altar, altarpiece, carvings, and paintings were removed and replaced with those of a neoclassical design. The walls and ceiling of the chancel are painted a light blue, and lack the paintings and azulejo tiling of churches in Bahia of the same period. A chancel arch and new floor of Italian marble was installed in 1887.

== Structure ==
The Church of the Third Order of Penitence of Saint Dominic was built of stone masonry and lime. It interior has a single monumental nave, a choir, a chancel and high altar, a sacristy, two lateral corridors, a room dedicated to Our Lady of Death (Nossa Senhora da Boa Morte), a chapel dedicated to Our Lady of Death, a massive circular stairway of jacaranda wood, and miscellaneous other rooms. The room dedicated to Our Lady of Death now functions as a display room for artworks, primarily statues of saints, of the church.

The painting of the ceiling of the nave is titled The Vision of Saint Dominic (Visão de São Domingos) and depicts the Virgin Mary, Jesus, and Saint Dominic. The painting, while monumental, probably lacks details of the original; an inscription states that it was first painted in 1749, but restored in 1875. The nave ceiling painting is similar to those of Franciscan churches of the interior Recôncavo region, notably that of the Church and Convent of Saint Antony in Cairu and of the Convent of Saint Francis in São Francisco do Conde.

The chancel has a ceiling with six vaulted windows. It was originally richly painted, like that of the Church and Convent of Our Lady of the Conception of Lapa, and had a rich collection of azulejos. These elements have disappeared, and the ceiling and walls are now painted in plain blue.

== Protected status ==
The Church of the Third Order of Penitence of Saint Dominic of Osma was listed as a historic structure by the National Institute of Historic and Artistic Heritage in 1938 under inscription number 83.

== Access ==
The Church of the Third Order of Penitence of Saint Dominic of Osma is open to the public and may be visited.
