= Fundação Casa de Jorge Amado =

Museum in Salvador, Bahia, Brazil

- Fundação Casa de Jorge Amado
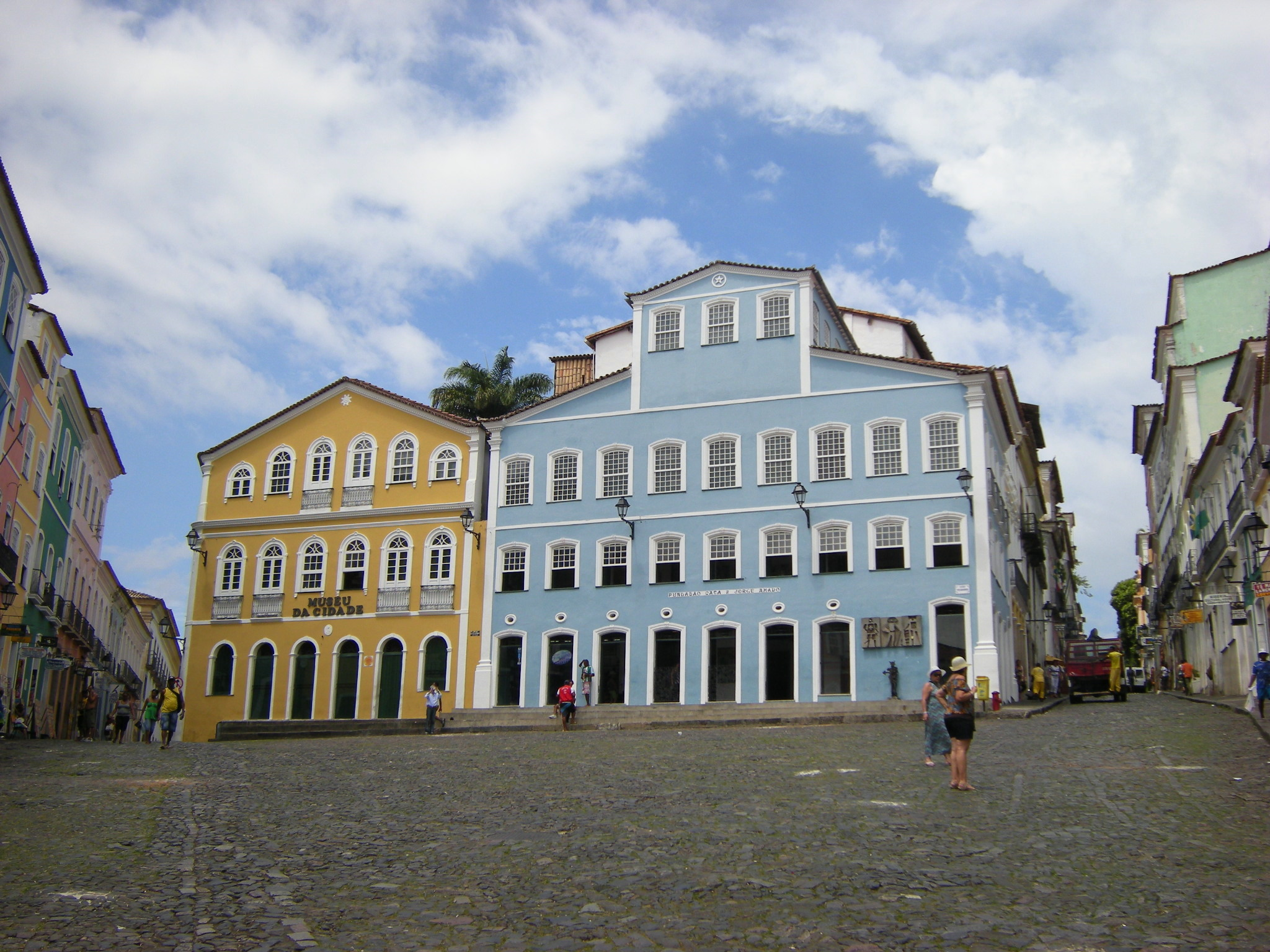
- Fundação Casa de Jorge Amado in 2010

- Location within Brazil
- Established: 1986
- Location: Largo do Pelourinho, Historic Center of Salvador, Salvador, Bahia, Brazil
- Coordinates: 12.971507219170027°S 38.50842788465575°W
- Type: Literary museum, cultural center, research institution
- Key holdings: Jorge Amado and Zélia Gattai collections
- Collections: Manuscripts, correspondence, photographs, books, audiovisual materials, artworks, periodicals
- Collection size: Approximately 250,000 documents
- Founders: Jorge Amado, Zélia Gattai, Myriam Fraga
- Owner: Fundação Casa de Jorge Amado
- Website: www.jorgeamado.org.br

The Fundação Casa de Jorge Amado is a Brazilian non-governmental, non-profit organization headquartered in the mansion facing Largo do Pelourinho in Salvador, Bahia. It is a cultural institution offering a variety of activities and housing a research center with documentation on Jorge Amado, Zélia Gattai, and Bahian literature. The center is open to the public and features courses, seminars, workshops, lecture series, talks, book and album launches, and exhibitions, with a focus on literary, artistic, and humanities themes.

Its goal is to preserve, research, and promote Jorge Amado’s literary and artistic collections, as well as to encourage and support studies and research on the writer’s life and on Bahian art and literature. The foundation is also committed to creating a permanent forum for discussions on Bahian culture, particularly regarding the struggle to overcome racial and class discrimination.

Its creation was made possible thanks to the essential collaboration of Jorge Amado himself and his wife, Zélia Gattai, as well as the writer Myriam Fraga.

== History ==
In 1982, Jorge Amado celebrated his 70th birthday and 50 years as a writer. At that time, several institutions in Brazil and abroad were pressuring the writer to donate his literary collection so that it could be better preserved and studied. However, his wife, the writer Zélia Gattai, opposed the idea, stating that the collection belonged to the people of Bahia and, therefore, should remain in Bahia.

Two years later, the writer Myriam Fraga once again raised the issue of the need to establish an institution to house Jorge’s collection. The Federal University of Bahia (UFBA), whose president at the time was Germano Tabacof, undertook the task of organizing the documents, through a process of appraisal, cataloging, and preparation of the collection, which until then had been stored at the writer’s home in the Rio Vermelho neighborhood of Salvador. The work was carried out by a team of professors from the School of Library Science at the Federal University of Bahia.

The collection was truly significant, although a large portion of the documents, dating from before 1950, had been destroyed, not only as a result of political persecution during the Estado Novo regime, but also due to their natural dispersal during the years of exile. Jorge Amado was forced into exile in Argentina and Uruguay after being persecuted by Getúlio Vargas due to his activism and his affiliation with the Brazilian Communist Party (PCB).

Many politicians and business leaders were involved in the creation of the Foundation. José Sarney, who was president at the time, promised his full support for the project. The two mansions chosen to house the Foundation, designated as Historic Landmarks, were donated by the State Government of Bahia and Banco do Estado da Bahia (BANEB). The construction company Odebrecht (now Novonor) handled the electrical and plumbing installations, as well as fire prevention equipment to ensure the safety of the collection.

In 1986, the Jorge Amado House Foundation was established, and it was officially opened on March 7, 1987. The opening ceremony lasted all day. It began at 11 a.m. with a speech by President José Sarney. The abbot of Monastery of São Bento, D. Timóteo Amoroso Anastácio, performed the Catholic blessing of the premises, and the babalorixá Luís da Muriçoca proceeded to cleanse the House with incense and sacred leaves. In the afternoon, the padê took place, a ceremony that marks the beginning of the obligations of Candomblé, in which some of Bahia’s most important casas-de-santo participated through their representatives. The evening celebration featured performances by various artists, many of whom are connected to Bahian culture, including Zezé Motta, Batatinha, João Gilberto, Dorival Caymmi, Gilberto Gil, Caetano Veloso, Alceu Valença, Djavan, Maria Bethânia, Gal Costa, Moraes Moreira, Geraldo Azevedo, Nana Caymmi, Juca Chaves, Filhos de Gandhy,Olodum, Ara Ketu, Edil Pacheco, Paulinho Camafeu, and, Riachão. The Bahian actress Nilda Spencer hosted the party, which was attended by more than 20,000 people. Amado said, “I watched the start of the party from a window; I couldn't stay until the end—the heart has its limits.”

Due to the COVID-19 pandemic, the museum's activities have been suspended. With a budget of 2 million reais, in December 2025, the foundation underwent a renovation—the largest restoration and conservation project since its founding on March 7, 1987. The renovation took nine months. The renovation gave greater prominence to exhibitions by Zélia Gattai and Mãe Stella de Oxóssi, while also renovating and updating the foundation’s infrastructure.

== Headquarters ==
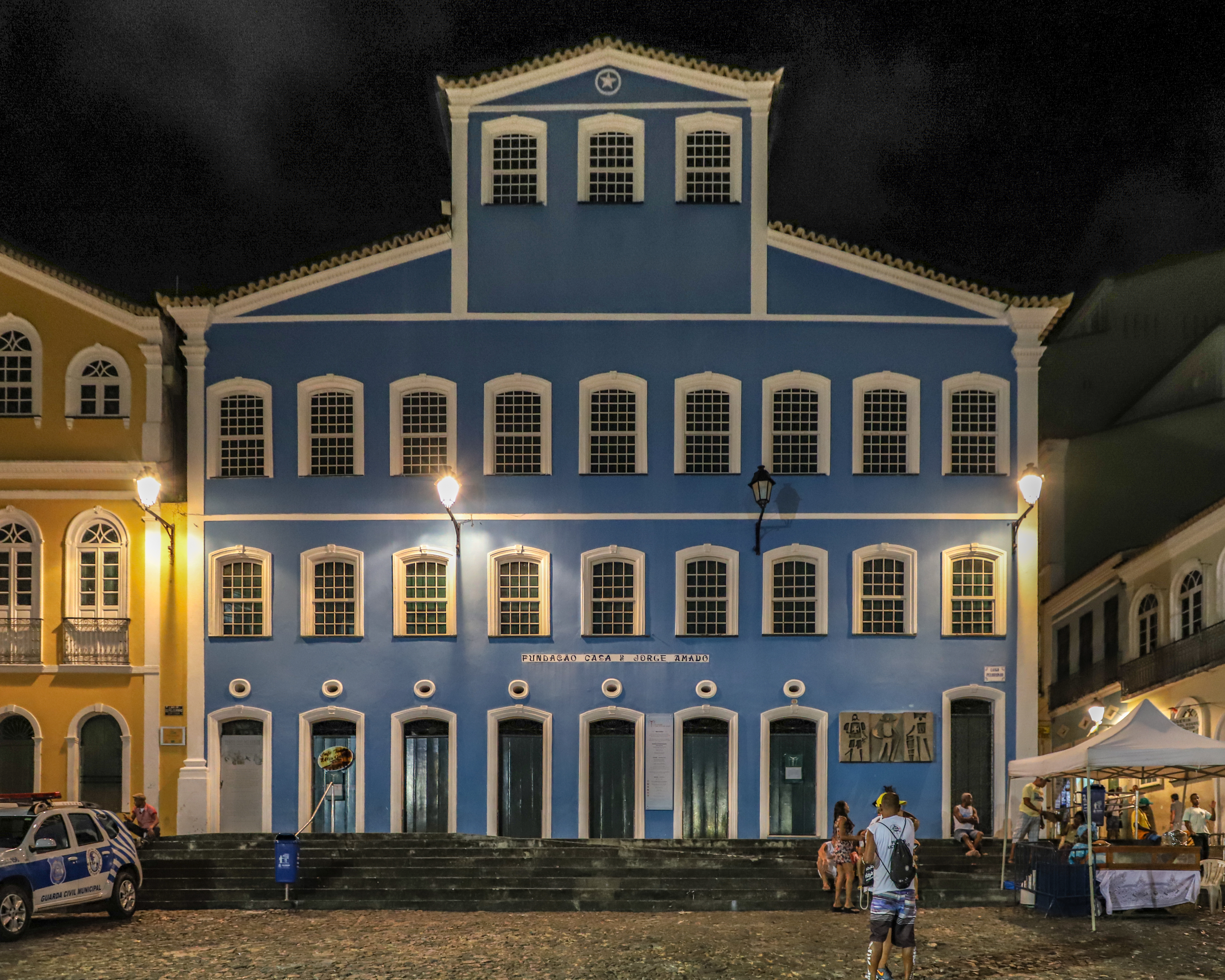
Night view of Jorge Amado's House in 2018.

The Jorge Amado House Foundation is located in the mansions at numbers 47, 49, and 51 in the Historic Center of Salvador. Jorge Amado lived in the mansion at number 68 on Alfredo Brito Street, also known as Portas do Carmo Street, just a few meters from the Foundation’s headquarters.

== Symbols ==
At the request of Jorge Amado himself, Eshu, one of the most powerful orixás in the Candomblé liturgy, was chosen as the symbol and guardian of the Foundation. Lord of the crossroads, Eshu opens doors, closes paths, protects his godchildren, and guards the doors of the Foundation, placed there in a solemn ritual by Mãe Stella de Oxóssi, one of the most respected ialorixás in Bahia, represented by the iron sculpture by Brazilian sculptor Tatti Moreno, donated by the writer Jorge Amado.

Once the symbol was chosen, Carybé, a close friend of Jorge Amado and a founding member of the institution, set out to embody it through a drawing that, through the simplicity of its lines and the power of its representation, would identify the Foundation, giving it a distinct character and recognition for its proposals and actions.

== Activities ==
To keep the memory of the writer alive, whose books have been translated into 49 languages and published in 55 countries, the Jorge Amado House has featured a permanent exhibition of documents, photographs, books, popular interpretations of his work, adaptations, and related objects since it opened. Also on display are awards received by Jorge and photos taken by Zélia Gattai, documenting the author’s daily life.

In addition, to address the lack of a publishing movement in Bahia, revitalize literature, and foster the emergence of new writers, the Casa de Palavras Publishing Project was created, which already boasts 142 publications. The Casa de Jorge Amado Foundation also aims to support and encourage studies on Bahian literature, discuss Brazilian society, and revitalize literature.

The institution also organizes courses, seminars, workshops, lecture series, talks, book and album launches, and exhibitions, both independently and in collaboration with other institutions.

The adoption, suggested by the author himself, Jorge Amado, of the phrase “If you come in peace, you may enter” as the House’s motto sought to express the desire of those who chose this space as a place where understanding between opposing sides would be prioritized, in the pursuit of harmony and brotherhood, against all forms of discrimination.

=== Research and Documentation Division ===
The Research and Documentation Division holds approximately 250,000 documents, distributed across three collections.

The main collection, the Jorge Amado Collection, brings together the writer’s personal papers and records of the creation, publication, translations, circulation, and reception of his work. These include books he authored in Brazilian and Portuguese editions, as well as translations into 44 languages; publications in periodicals; articles; song lyrics and co-authored works; works as a translator and editor; personal documents; correspondence; originals; certificates; diplomas; awards; trophies; medals; and plaques received in Brazil and abroad. In addition to theses, studies, and citations about the author, biographies, adaptations of her work for film, theater, and television, photographs, films, videotapes, records, posters, and other items.

The Zélia Gattai Collection comprises a collection of works published by the writer, translations, critical reception, and a valuable archive of photographs (estimated at 21,000 negatives) documenting Jorge Amado’s career over the past sixty years. Part of this collection of photographs was published in 1986 by Corrupio under the title Reportagem Incompleta, now out of print; in the book Jorge Amado Fotobiografia, by Alumbramento; and in issue no. 28 of Exu magazine.

The third collection brings together documents about the Foundation itself, ranging from the initial ideas and steps taken to establish it to records of its activities and events over the course of its 24-year history. This collection also includes paintings, sculptures, and other works of art donated to the institution, as well as the complete collection of the magazine Exu and the books published by the Casa de Palavras series.

=== Programs and Projects ===
Since the Jorge Amado House Foundation is primarily dedicated to literary creation, it is abundantly clear that it was conceived as a hub for initiatives aimed at literary production, supporting and promoting the professional work of writers. To this end, the Foundation has organized courses, workshops, seminars, and lectures, in addition to coordinating and facilitating school visits, accompanied by guides, with the aim of sparking students’ interest.

=== Casa de Palavras ===
Seeking to stimulate, develop, and promote literary creation in Bahia and Brazil, the Jorge Amado House Foundation launched the Casa de Palavras publishing program.

The first publication released was the magazine Exu, whose 36 issues achieved great success, reaching a circulation of five thousand copies. With the goal of serving as a voice for the Jorge Amado House, Exu also sought to promote Bahian writers, illustrators, and designers, recognizing and publicizing their work. The Casa de Palavras Collection was created to foster the Bahian publishing movement and currently comprises 12 editorial lines: Essays, Poetry, Art, Jorge Amado Collection, Memoirs, Fiction, Literature, Co-publications, Unpublished Works, Drawings, Theater, and Recôncavo.

== In popular culture ==
The institution is mentioned in the song Haiti, written by Caetano Veloso and Gilberto Gil and released on the 1993 album Tropicália 2.
