= Augusto da Silva =

Brazilian catholic cardinal

His Eminence Augusto Álvaro da Silva
- Archbishop of São Salvador da Bahia
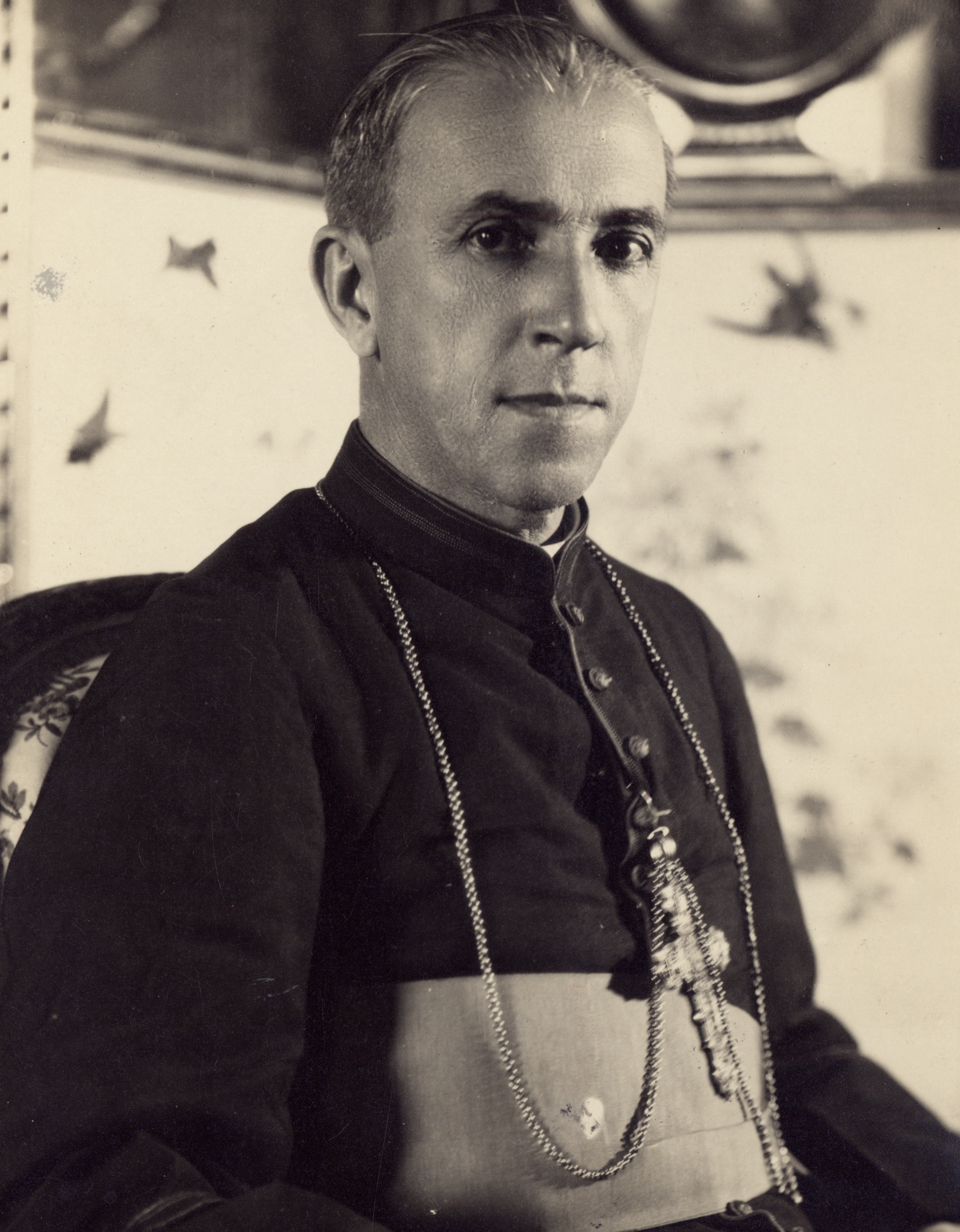
- Church: Roman Catholic Church
- Archdiocese: São Salvador da Bahia
- See: São Salvador da Bahia
- Appointed: 18 December 1924
- Installed: 20 May 1925
- Term ended: 14 August 1968
- Predecessor: Jerônimo Tomé da Silva
- Successor: Eugênio de Araújo Sales
- Other post: Cardinal-Priest pro hac vice of Sant'Angelo in Pescheria (1953–1968)
- Previous posts: Bishop of Floresta (1911–1915); Bishop of Barra (1915–1924)

Orders
- Ordination: 5 March 1899
- Consecration: 22 October 1911 by Luís Raimundo da Silva Brito
- Created cardinal: 12 January 1953 by Pope Pius XII
- Rank: Cardinal-Priest

Personal details
- Born: Augusto Álvaro da Silva; 8 April 1876 Recife, Brazil
- Died: 14 August 1968 (aged 92) Salvador, Bahia, Brazil
- Motto: Per crucem ad lucem
- Coat of arms

Styles of Augusto da Silva
- Reference style: His Eminence
- Spoken style: Your Eminence
- Religious style: São Salvador da Bahia
- Informal style: Cardinal
- See: São Salvador da Bahia

Augusto Álvaro da Silva (April 8, 1876 – August 14, 1968) was a Brazilian Cardinal of the Roman Catholic Church. He served as Archbishop of São Salvador da Bahia from 1924 until his death in 1968, and was elevated to the cardinalate in 1953 by Pope Pius XII.

== Biography ==
Born in Recife, Augusto da Silva studied at the seminary in Olinda before being ordained to the priesthood on March 5, 1899. He then did pastoral work in Olinda, and also served as Master of Ceremonies to the cathedral. Silva was raised to the rank of Privy Chamberlain of His Holiness on September 30, 1908.

On May 12, 1911, Silva was appointed the first Bishop of Floresta by Pope Pius X. He received his episcopal consecration on the following October 22 from Archbishop Luís da Silva Brito, with Bishops Francisco de Paula Silva, CM, and Joaquim d'Almeida serving as co-consecrators. Silva was later named Bishop of Barra do Rio Grande on June 25, 1915, and Archbishop of São Salvador da Bahia on December 17, 1924. In virtue of his position as Archbishop of São Salvador da Bahia, he was also Primate of the Church in Brazil.

Pope Pius XII created Silva Cardinal-Priest of S. Angelo in Pescheria in the consistory of January 12, 1953. He attended the first General Conference of the Latin American Episcopal Conference in 1955, and the Second Vatican Council from 1962 to 1965. Silva was one of the cardinal electors in the 1958 papal conclave that selected Pope John XXIII, and again participated in the conclave of 1963, which resulted in the election of Pope Paul VI.

He died in São Salvador da Bahia, at age 92. He is buried in the Cathedral-Basilica of the Transfiguration of the Lord.

== Demolition of the Old Cathedral of Salvador ==
As Archbishop of São Salvador da Bahia Augusto da Silva allowed the demolition of three colonial buildings in the Historic Center of Salvador. The 16th-century Old Cathedral of Salvador was demolished on August 7, 1933 to make room tram routes into the upper city and trolley storage. The lines were soon abandoned. The former Jesuit church of Salvador became the new Cathedral of Salvador in the same year.

Catholic Church titles
Preceded by none	Bishop of Floresta; 1911–1915	Succeeded by José de Oliveira Lopes
Preceded by none	Bishop of Barra do Rio Grande; 1915–1924	Succeeded by Adalberto Accioli Sobral
Preceded by Jerónimo Thomé da Silva	Archbishop of São Salvador da Bahia; 1924–1968	Succeeded by Eugênio de Araújo Sales
Records
Preceded by Carlos María de la Torre	Oldest living Member of the College of Cardinals; 31 July – 14 August 1968	Succeeded by Giuseppe Pizzardo
