= Terreiro de Jesus =

Plaza in Salvador, Brazil

Coordinates: 12°58′23″S 38°30′36″W

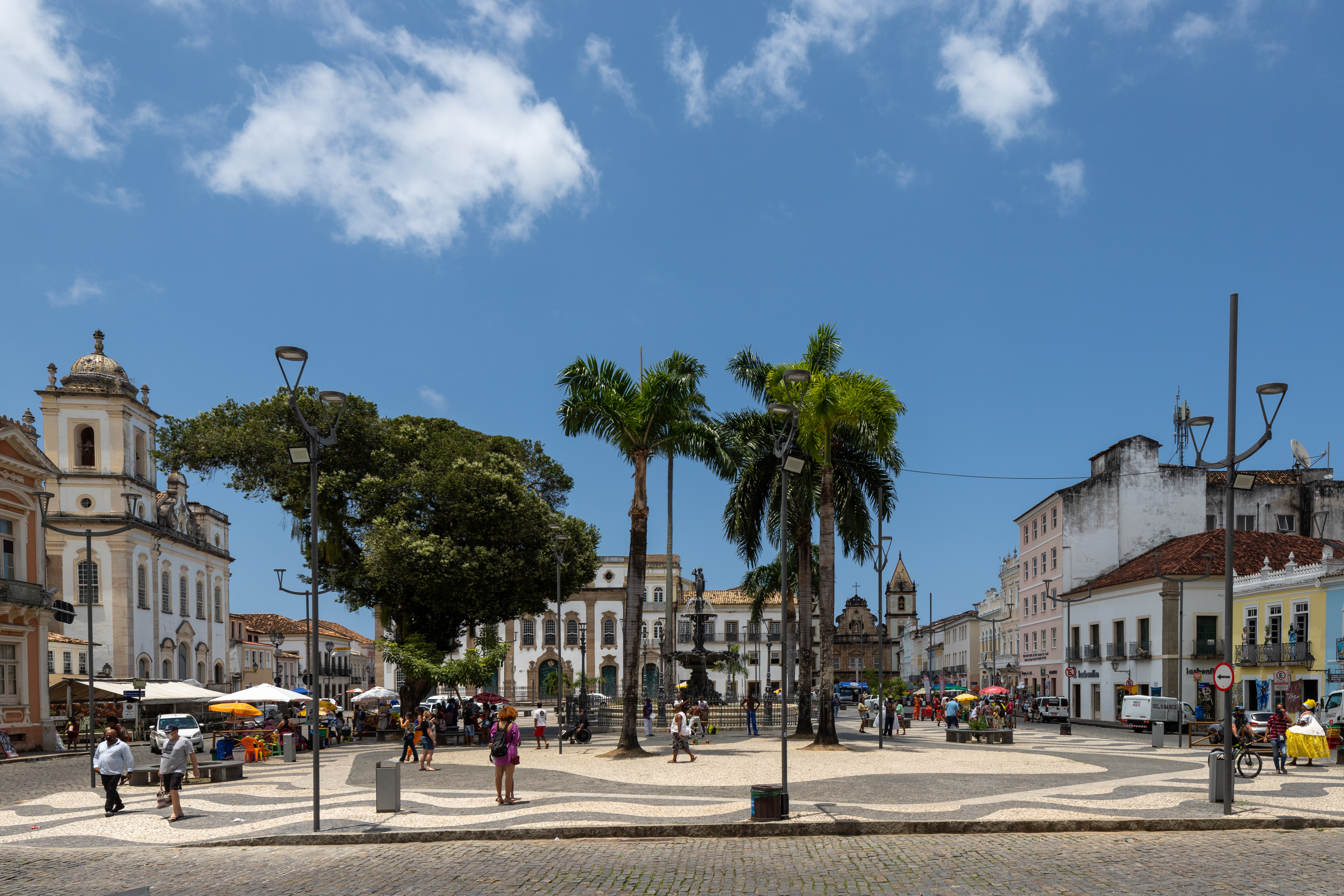
Terreiro de Jesus in 2021

The Terreiro de Jesus is a plaza located in the Historic Center of Salvador de Bahia in Brazil. The square is located in the oldest part of the city and abuts the Praça da Sé. The Cathedral Basilica of Salvador, formerly the school and church of the Jesuits, is the most prominent structure in the Terreiro de Jesus, and occupies the west of the square. The plaza takes its names from the society. It was renovated in the mid-20th century by the landscape architect Roberto Burle Marx. It is officially known as the Praça 15 de Novembro, and forms a central cultural and historical center of the city.

== History ==
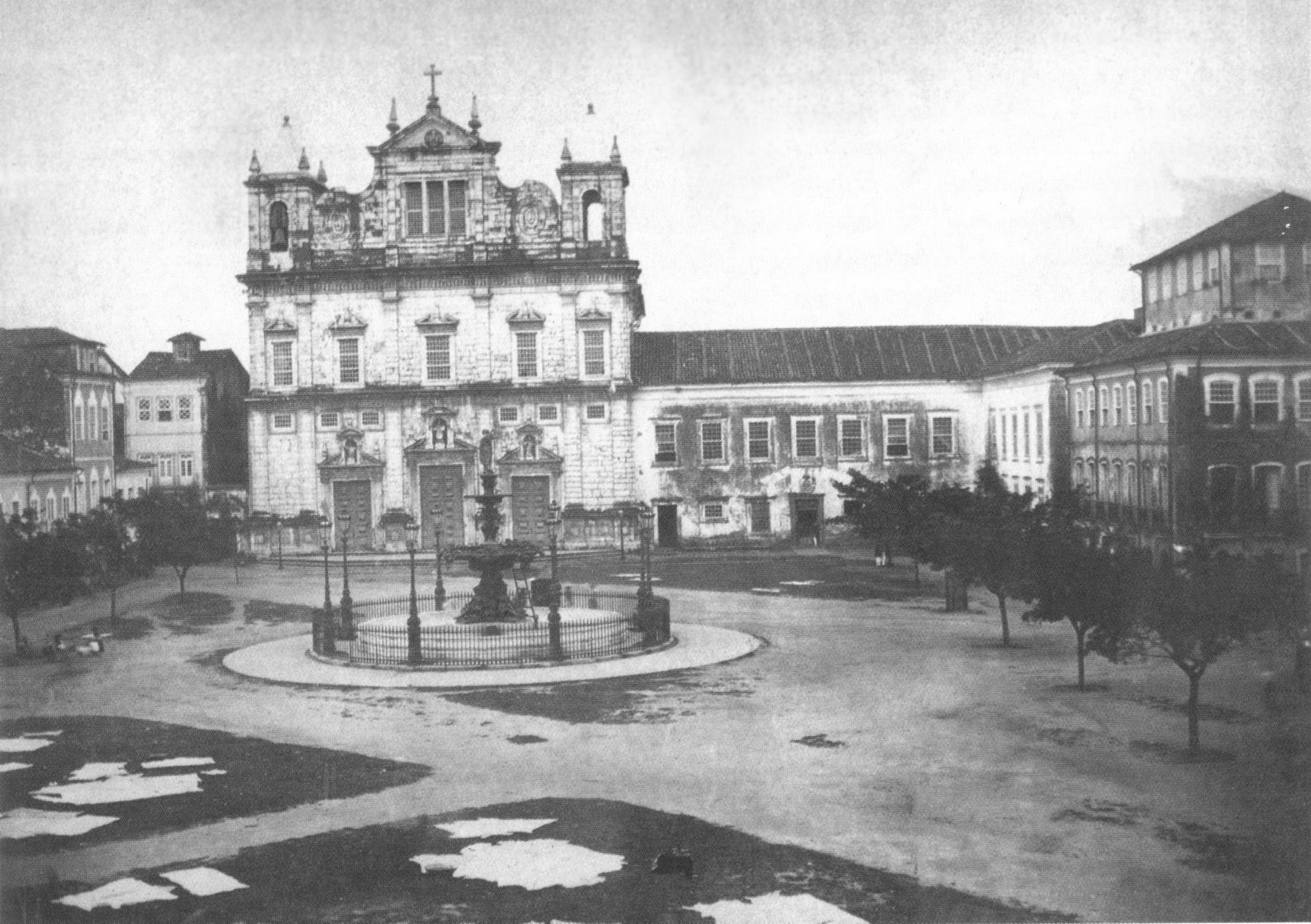
View of the Terreiro de Jesus, with the Cathedral in the background, photographed in 1862. The old Colégio dos Jesuítas de Salvador (Salvador Jesuit School) is next to the church

After the foundation of Salvador by the Portuguese, Governor-General Tomé de Sousa granted the Jesuits a land grant in the northern section of the new city. The Jesuits, led by Father Manuel da Nóbrega constructed a small chapel and the Colégio dos Jesuítas (Jesuit School). The presence of many Jesuit priests in the area surrounding the church and school led to the plaza being known as the "Terreiro de Jesus." Construction on the Jesuit School finished in 1590. Portuguese explorer and naturalist 1584, Gabriel Soares de Sousa, who visited Salvador in 1584, wrote one of the first descriptions of the Terreiro de Jesus. In his book Notícia do Brasil (1587) Gabriel Soares de Sousa described the Terrerio de Jesus as "... ocupa este terreiro e parte da rua da banda do mar um suntuoso colégio dos padres da Companhia de Jesus, com uma formosa e alegre igreja..."

The initial church constructed on the site in the sixteenth century was very small. Between 1652 and 1672, the Jesuits build a larger, palatial church, which contemporary observers considered to be the most impressive religious building in 17th century Brazil. The Mannerist facade of the building was built with lioz stone, a kind of limestone imported from Portugal. The interior had magnificent tile walls, an elaborate painted wood ceiling depicting notable Jesuits, and furniture inlaid with tortoise shell.

In the early nineteenth century, the old Jesuit School building functioned as a hospital. In 1808, it became home to the first medical school in Brazil. The colonial building was destroyed in a fire in 1905, and was replaced by a new building with eclectic style and neoclassical design.

=== 20th century ===
The Urban Planning Commission of the City of Salvador (CPUCS) invited the landscape architect Roberto Burle Marx to modernize the square in 1948. Marx replaced the existing flooring with a parterre of sinuous Portuguese tiles in black and white, and local materials such as shells and beach pebbles. Marx retained the existing fountain and existing vegetation. The renovation of the square by Marx was strongly criticized in the press of Salvador.

== See also ==
- Cathedral of Salvador
- Historic Center of Salvador
- List of Jesuit sites
