= Ó Paí, Ó =

2007 film directed by Monique Gardenberg

- Directed by: Monique Gardenberg
- Written by: Monique Gardenberg
- Based on: Ó Paí, Ó by Márcio Mello
- Produced by: Augusto Casé; Paula Lavigne; Sara Silveira
- Starring: Lázaro Ramos; Wagner Moura; Dira Paes
- Cinematography: Dudu Miranda
- Edited by: Giba Assis Brasil; João Paulo Carvalho
- Music by: Davi Moraes; Caetano Veloso
- Production company: Dueto Filmes
- Distributed by: Europa Filmes
- Release date: March 30, 2007
- Running time: 96 minutes
- Country: Brazil
- Language: Portuguese
- Box office: R$3,172,654

Ó Paí, Ó (colloquial form of "Olhe Para Isso, Olhe", translated as Look At This, Look) is a 2007 Brazilian drama film directed by Monique Gardenberg. It tells the story of cortiço residents in Pelourinho, the historical center of Salvador, Bahia on the last day of carnaval. Lacking money but not desire for amusement, they get by on creativity, irony, sensuality, and music.

The film inspired a TV series, also named Ó Paí, Ó, broadcast on Rede Globo. The 10-episode show premiered on October 31, 2008, and also stars Lázaro Ramos.

== Plot ==
The story takes place in a lively tenement building in the historic center of Pelourinho, in Salvador, during the final days of Carnival. The residents share a passion for Carnival, but they also have a common pet peeve: the building manager, Dona Joana (Luciana Souza). Everyone tries to find their place during the final days of the Carnival festivities, whether by working or having fun.

Everything unfolds on the last day of Carnival, until Dona Joana, a devout evangelical Christian, annoyed by the residents’ revelry, decides to put an end to the party by shutting off the building’s water supply. The residents, aspiring singer Roque (Lázaro Ramos), taxi driver Reginaldo (Érico Brás) and his wife Maria (Valdinéia Soriano), drag queen Yolanda (Lyu Arisson), shell game player Raimunda (Cássia Vale), bar owner Neuzão (Tânia Tôko) and her sultry niece Rosa (Emanuelle Araújo), Carmen (Auristela Sá), who performs clandestine abortions and runs an orphanage in her apartment, Psilene (Dira Paes), and Baiana (Rejane Maia), then find themselves facing the challenge of coping with the water shortage.

== Cast ==
- Lázaro Ramos as Roque
- Wagner Moura as Boca
- Dira Paes as Psilene
- Stênio Garcia as Seu Jerônimo
- Luciana Souza as Dona Joana
- Érico Brás as Reginaldo
- Tânia Tôko as Neusão da Rocha
- Emanuelle Araújo as Rosa
- Virginia Rodrigues as Bioncetão
