= Bamdamel =

Brazilian axé band

- Origin: Salvador, Bahia, Brazil
- Genres: Axé; samba reggae
- Years active: 1984–2002; 2014

Bamdamel (initially also known as Banda Mel until 1994) is an axé music band from Salvador, Bahia. It was formed in 1984 as a carnival block, Bloco Mel, and in 1987 it became a musical group. With 3 million copies sold, the band scored hits such as "Protesto do Olodum", "Prefixo de Verão", "Baianidade Nagô, "Ladeira do Pelô", "Bateu Saudade", "Na Bahia Tudo é Festa" and "Crença e Fé".

The band won the Multishow Brazilian Music Award for New Artist in 1995.

== Discography ==
=== Studio albums ===
- Força Interior (1987)
- E Lá Vou Eu (1988)
- Banda Mel do Brasil (1989)
- Prefixo de Verão (1990)
- Negra (1991)
- Mel (1992)
- Mãe Preta (1993)
- O Pulo da Gata (1994)
- Todo Mundo Dança (1995)
- Alegria (1996)
- Jeitinho de Dançar (1997)
- Pra Te Balançar (2001)

=== Live albums ===
- Ao Vivo I (1998)
- Ao Vivo II (1999)
- Ao Vivo III: Nossa História (2002)
- Ao Vivo IV: Made in Brazil (2006)
