= Cathedral Basilica of Salvador =

Church in Salvador, Brazil

- Catedral Basílica de Salvador
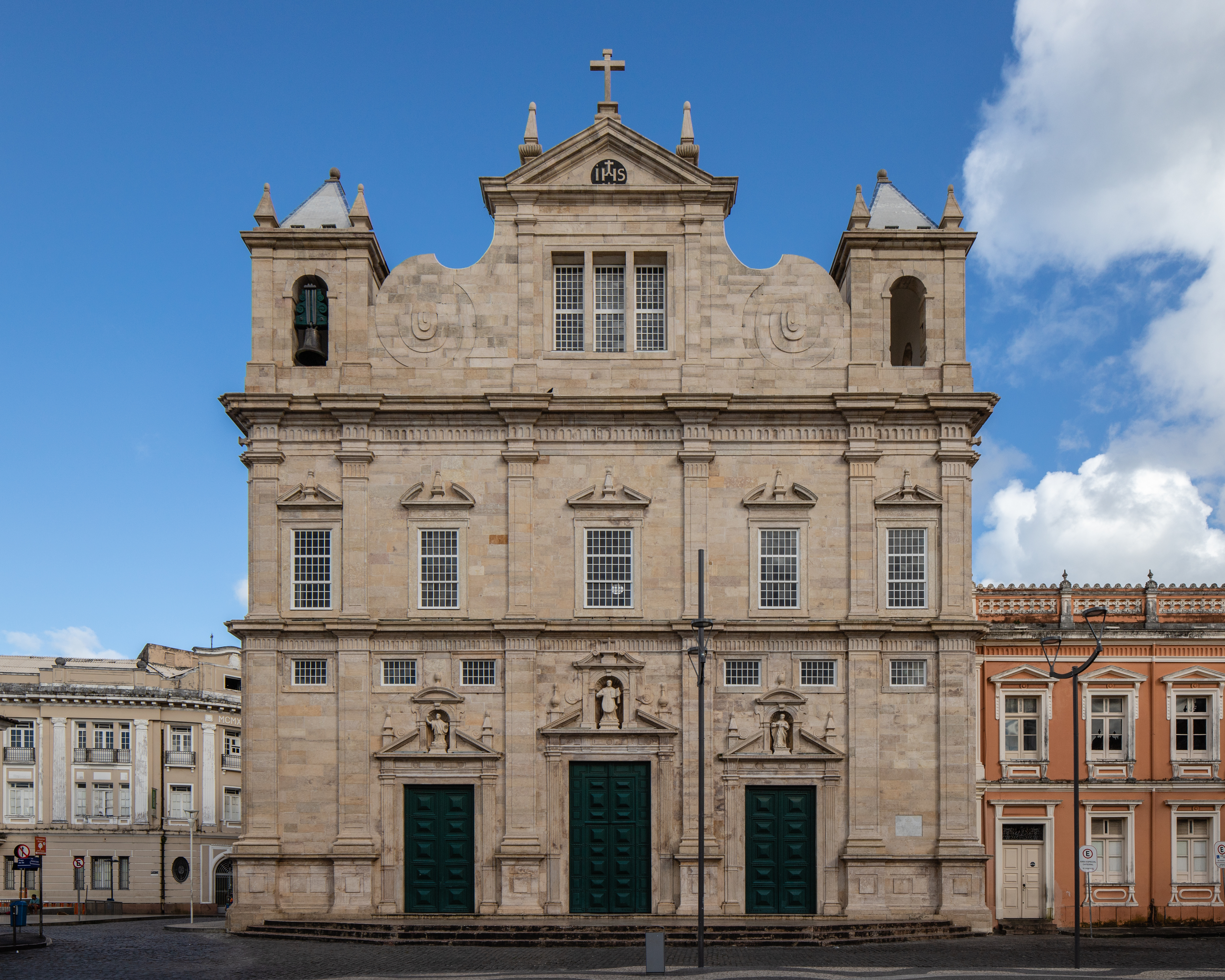
- Façade of the Cathedral of Salvador, Bahia, Brazil, formerly a Jesuit church.

- Location of the Catedral Basílica de Salvador

Religion
- Affiliation: Catholic
- Province: Roman Catholic Archdiocese of São Salvador da Bahia
- Rite: Roman Rite

Location
- Municipality: Salvador
- State: Bahia
- Country: Brazil
- Coordinates: 12°58′22″S 38°30′37″W

Architecture
- Direction of façade: Northwest

National Historic Heritage of Brazil
- Designated: 1938
- Reference no.: 84

The Cathedral Basilica of Salvador (Catedral Basílica de Salvador), officially dedicated to the Transfiguration of Christ and named Primatial Cathedral Basilica of the Transfiguration of the Lord is the seat of the Archbishop of the city of Salvador, in the State of Bahia, in Brazil. The Archbishop of Salvador is also ex officio Primate of Brazil. The structure was built by the Society of Jesus as part of a large Jesuit monastic and educational complex. The current church is the fourth built on the site, and was consecrated in 1672. After the expulsion of the Jesuits from Brazil in 1759, the school and church were transferred to the Archbishopric of Bahia. Archbishop Augusto Álvaro da Silva ordered the demolition of the existing cathedral of Salvador in 1933 to construct a tram line, and elevated the existing Jesuit structure to the status of basilica.

The cathedral is considered one of the finest examples of Mannerism in the Portuguese empire and strongly resembles the Jesuit Church of Coimbra. The façade and other elements of the structure utilize Lioz stone from Portugal. The interior of the cathedral has a large nave, elaborate baroque-style side altars, a sacristy, library, and ossuary.

The Cathedral Basilica of Salvador faces a broad plaza, the Terreiro de Jesus, is flanked by the broad Praça da Sé to the south, and overlooks the Bay of All Saints to the rear. It is a focal point of the Historic Center of Salvador, a UNESCO World Heritage Site.

== History ==
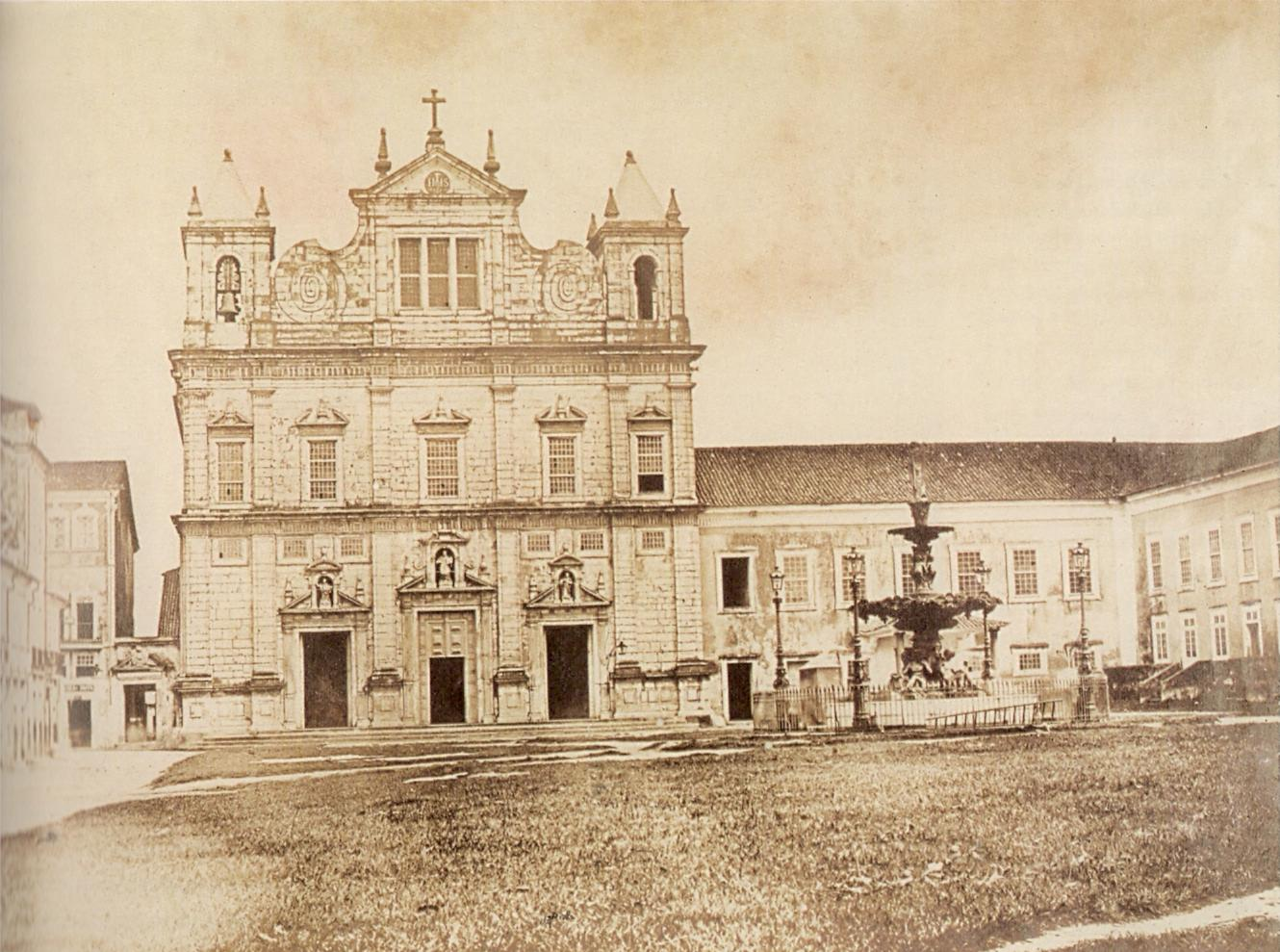
View of the Cathedral in 1858

The Jesuits arrived in the city in the 1549 and planned a Jesuit college under Father Manuel da Nóbrega (1517-1570). The Diocese of São Salvador da Bahia de Todos os Santos, the first in the Portuguese colony of Brazil, was created in 1551, only two years after the founding of Salvador by the Portuguese nobleman Tomé de Sousa. The first bishop, Pero Fernandes Sardinha, arrived in 1552, and a Jesuit college was established in 1564. The Colégio de Jesus (School of Jesus) was completed in 1585 through the financial support of the first governor-general of Bahia, Mem de Sá. Separately, a cathedral was built in the centre of Salvador around this time. Three Jesuit church buildings were erected on the site of the present-day cathedral, the final being destroyed during the Dutch occupation of Brazil.

=== Dutch occupation ===
The Dutch, upon their entry into Salvador in 1624, stripped the interior of the Jesuit college of its silverwork and a relic reportedly used by St. Francis Xavier. The Dutch used the Jesuit chapel as a warehouse to store barrels of wine confiscated from the city. Salvador was reoccupied by the Portuguese in 1625, but the church and most buildings of the city were heavily damaged and remained under siege by the Dutch until 1654.

=== Reconstruction of Jesuit complex ===
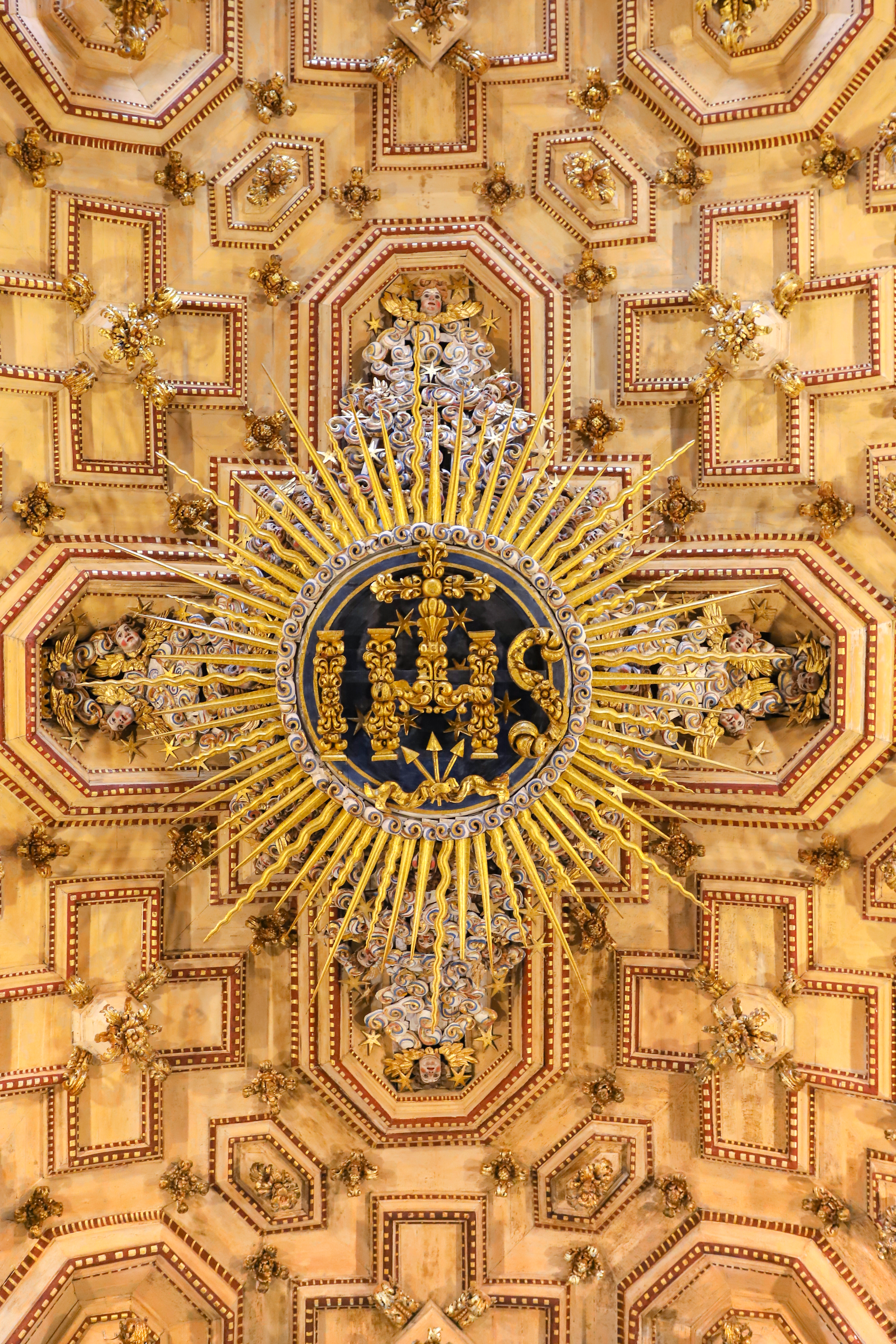
Barrel vaulted ceiling with emblem of the Jesuits at center

The Jesuits gathered to build a fourth church, the present structure, in 1654. The cornerstone of the present structure was laid in 1657 at a grand ceremony and mass attended by Governor-General Jerónimo de Ataíde, the Conde de Atouguia (1610-1665) and numerous government and military figures. The mass was celebrated by Father Simão de Vasconcelos. The structure was completed in 1672. Its frontispiece dates to 1679 and its steeples were completed in 1694. The images of Saint Ignatius, Saint Francis Xavier, and Saint Francis of Borja were placed on the frontispiece in 1746. Housing for three religious communities, the father, the Escolásticas, and the Brotherhood; a smaller chapel; a refectory and kitchen; a novitiate; and a small school were completed soon after the opening of the church. The religious community numbered approximately 150, as evidenced by the seating of the domestic chapel. The novitiate was moved to the lower city in 1728 to the present-day Casa Pia and College of the Orphans of Saint Joachim.

=== Expulsion of the Jesuits ===
The Jesuit Order was expelled from Brazil by a Royal Letter dated August 28, 1759. The college was besieged by soldiers and all its inhabitants, including priests, students, and brothers, were detained on December 26, 1759. It was one of the final acts of governor Marcos de Noronha before the arrival of the new governor from Portugal, Antônio de Almeida Soares. Soares moved the entire community of Jesuits on January 7, 1760 into the domestic chapel of the college and sealed the doors and windows. The members of the community, now prisoners, were taken by armed soldiers to Novitiate of Jiquitaia in the lower city; other troops guarded the route to ward off observers. The community was held until April 18, 1760, when they boarded two boats. The Jesuits were taken to either dungeons in Lisbon or dispersed to pontifical territories in Italy. Their church was transferred to the Archbishopric in 1765 under Manuel de Santa Inês.

=== 20th century ===
The remains of the school of the Jesuits, north of the current structure, burned in 1905. The church became the only remnant of the Jesuit complex. The Jesuit school was replaced by the Medical School of Bahia, and a corridor was built to connect the school to the church. The Old Cathedral of Salvador, built in the late 16th century, was demolished in 1933 under Archbishop Augusto Álvaro da Silva (1876-1968) in order to construct a tram route in Salvador. The former Jesuit church became the cathedral of the city.

== Location ==
The Cathedral Basilica of Salvador is located on the edge of the bluff of the historic center of Salvador. It façade faces west and church doors open to the wide Terreiro de Jesus, a public square. The cathedral looks directly towards the Church of Saint Dominic at the opposite end of the square; the Medical School of Bahia and church Church of Saint Peter of the Clergymen to the north of the square; and 19th-century sobrados at the south of the square. The rear of the church faces the Bay of All Saints and the lower city. The cathedral is connected to the Medical School of Bahia by a corridor. The medical school dates to the early 20th century, and replaced the burned-out school of the Jesuits, once part of the church complex. The southern façade of the cathedral was connected to the Old Cathedral of Salvador until its demolition in 1933. The Praça da Sé, a broad square, was built after the demolition of the cathedral and the south façade of the Cathedral Basilica of Salvador, obscured for many centuries, looks onto the square.

== Art and architecture ==
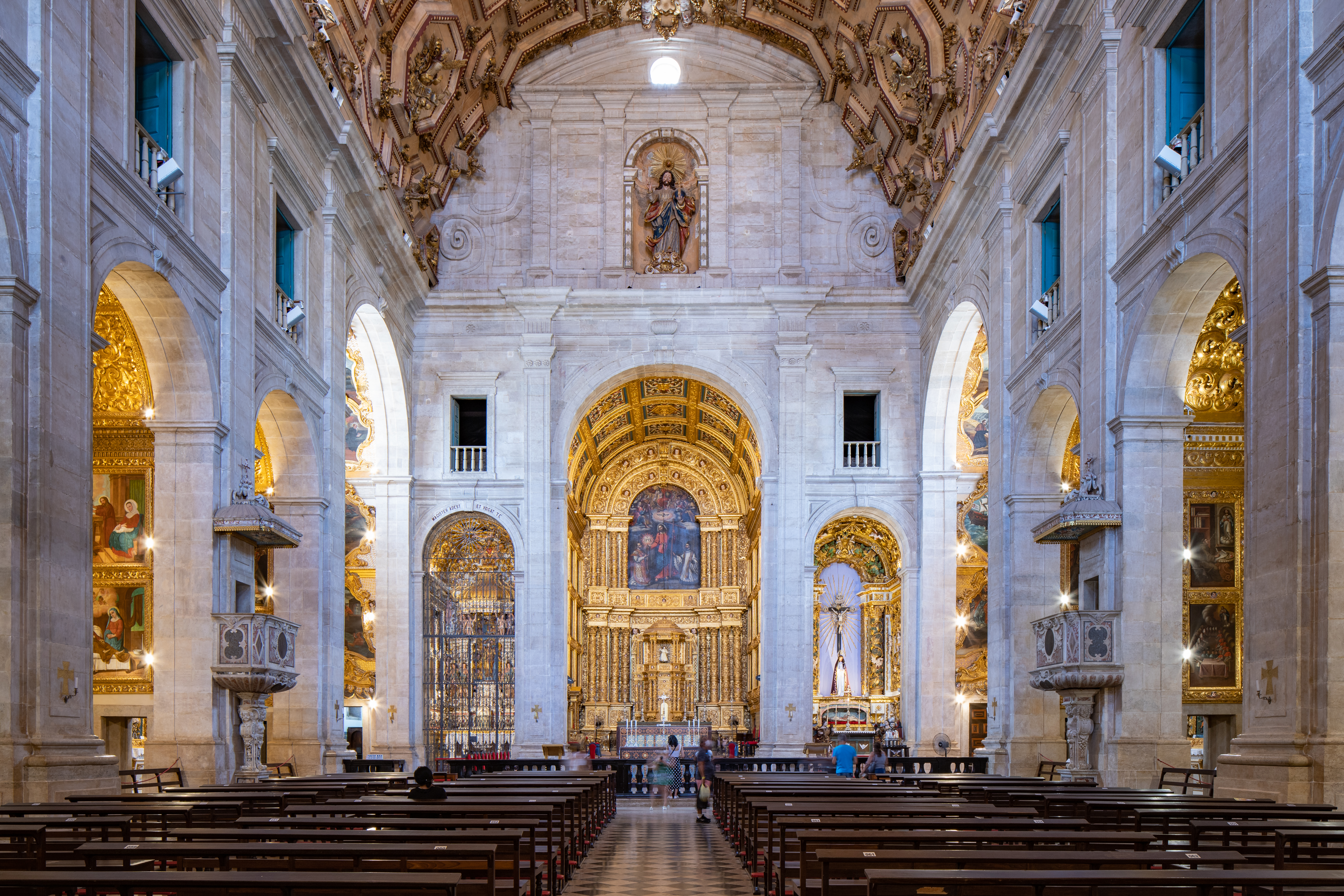
View of the nave and chancel

=== Façade ===
The Jesuits built the current church structure in the Mannerist style then fashionable in Portugal. The façade is very similar to contemporary Portuguese churches like the Jesuit Church of Coimbra. The façade is made in light Lioz stone brought from Portugal, a feature also found in the Basilica of the Immaculate Conception in the lower city of Salvador. The facade is flanked by two short bell towers. It has three portals with statues of Jesuit saints, Ignatius of Loyola, Francis Xavier and Francis Borgia. The gable on the upper storey of the façade is flanked by typical Mannerist volutes.

=== Interior ===
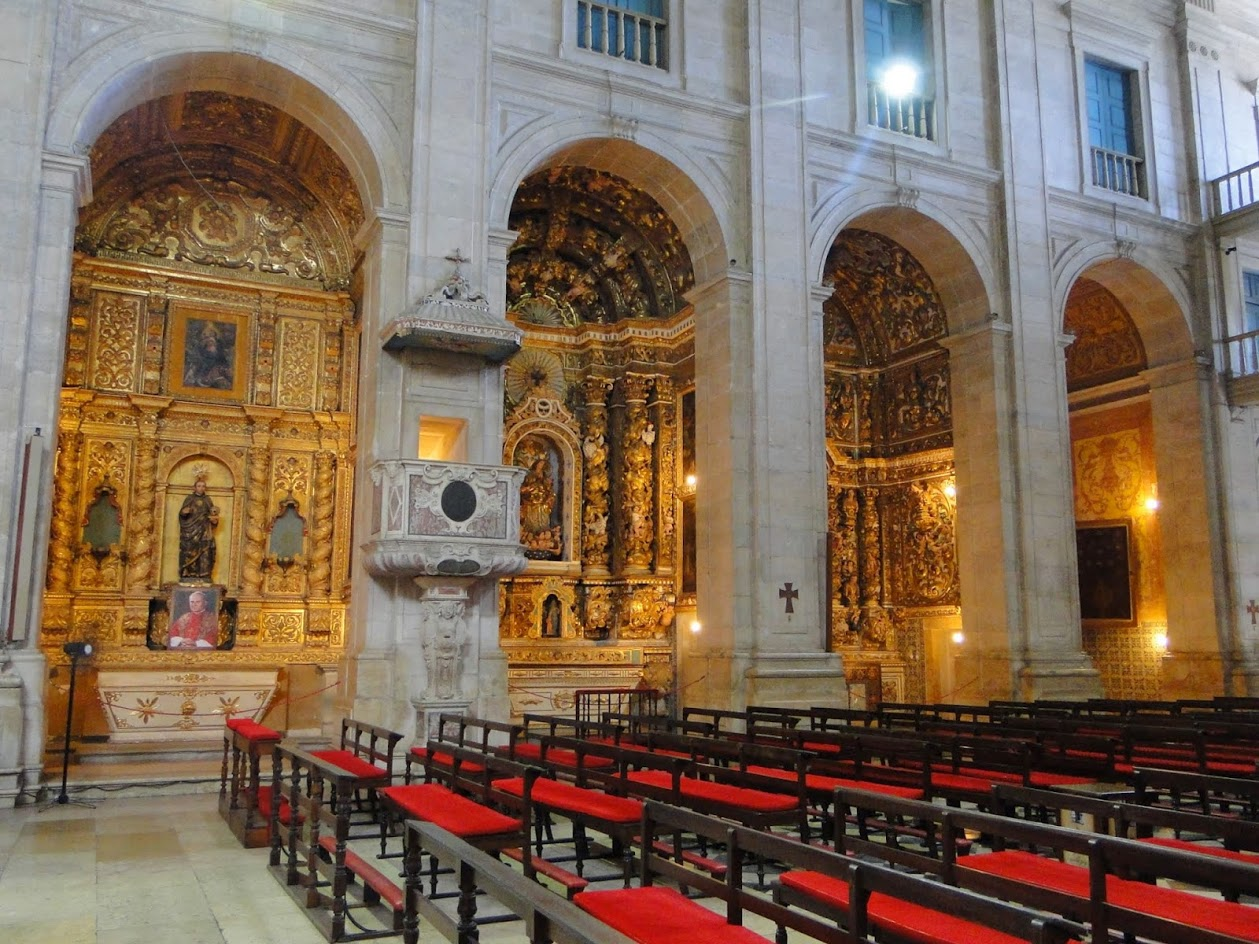
Side Chapels in the Cathedral Basilica of Salvador

Inside, the cathedral is a one-aisled church of rectangular shape, without transept and with a very shallow main chapel. The interior of the church, similar to its frontispiece, is lined with lioz stone from Portugal. The side walls of the church have a series of lateral chapels decorated with altarpieces. This floorplan scheme is based on the Church of São Roque in Lisbon, the Jesuit church of the Portuguese capital, built a century earlier. The nave of the church has a deep central altar, two lateral chapels, two chapels at the transept, and three chapels at each side of the nave. The chapels were constructed at different times and reflect numerous architectural periods and styles.

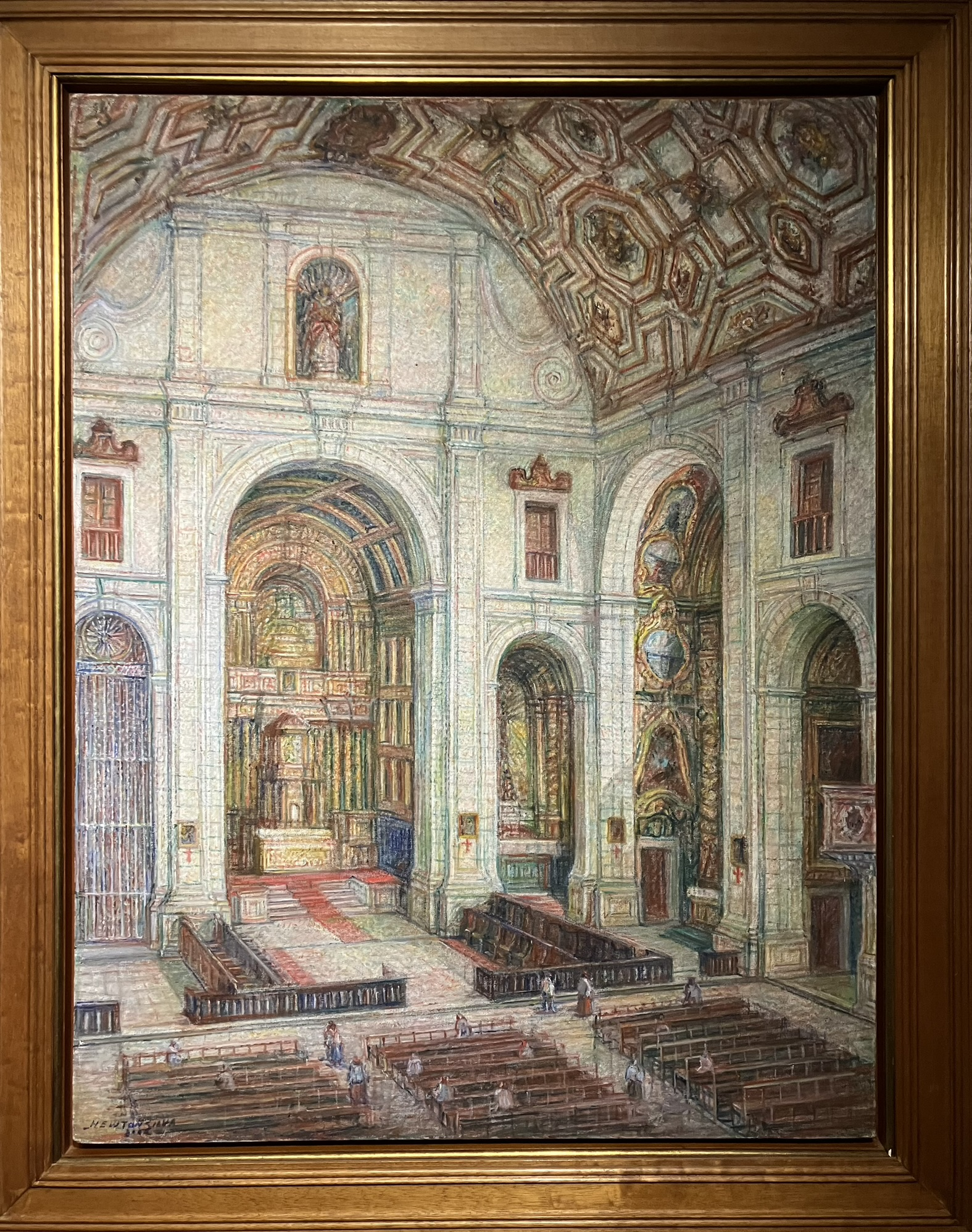
Painting of the Catedral-Basílica Primacial de São Salvador's interior (c. 1970)

The chapels of the cathedral offer an interesting showcase of altarpiece art from the late 16th through the mid-18th centuries, all decorated with sculptures and paintings. Very rare are two 16th century Renaissance altarpieces that belonged to the previous Jesuit church and were reused in the new building. The altarpiece of the main chapel is a fine example of 17th-century Mannerist art. Other chapels have Baroque altarpieces from the mid-18th century. The barrel vault covering the nave of the church is decorated with wooden panels dating from the 18th century. A massive emblem at center displays the Jesuit emblem "IHS". The paintings at the base of the nave are in vivid colors with an Asian design. They were painted by Charles Belleville (1657-1730), a Jesuit who had lived in Macau for ten years prior to his arrival in Bahia.

The Jesuit church lacked a baptistery as it was not a parish church. The baptismal font of the Cathedral Basilica was transferred from the Former See prior to its demolition in 1933 and installed in the Cathedral Basilica.

The façade and floorplan of the Jesuit church of Salvador influenced several other colonial churches in Northeast Brazil, including the São Francisco Church of Salvador. The tomb of Mem de Sá's, the third governor-general of Bahia, is located beneath high altar.

=== Sacristy ===
The sacristy of the church dates to 1694 and faces west towards the Bay of All Saints. The sacristy is called "Brazil's most exquisite". It was described in 1703 in the diary of an anonymous author as having "walls, floors, and a ceiling of jacaranda wood with fine paintings; extraordinary furniture, cabinets and gilded closets; with true perfection of joinery." The sacristy now has three altars and is richly decorated with Baroque-style furniture.

The sacristy cabinet dates to the 17th century and has paintings of the life of Jesus on copper panels with an altar in the center. The walls are covered in 17th-century Portuguese azulejos. The coffered ceiling of the sacristy has wooden panels painted with Mannerist motifs and portraits of noted members of the Jesuit order.

== Protected status ==
The Cathedral of Salvador was listed as a historic structure by the National Institute of Historic and Artistic Heritage in 1938. The structure was registered under the Book of Historical Works, Inscription 77 and Book of Fine Arts, fls. 14. The directive is dated May 25, 1938.

== Access ==
The cathedral is open to the public and may be visited.

== See also ==
- List of Jesuit sites
