= Gabriel Soares de Sousa =

Portuguese naturalist (1540–1591)

- Born: 1540; Kingdom of Portugal
- Died: 1591 (aged 50–51); Bahia, colony of Brazil
- Occupations: Explorer, naturalist, writer

Gabriel Soares de Sousa (1540–1591) was a Portuguese explorer and naturalist. A participant in Francisco Barretos Africa expeditions, he settled in the Portuguese colony of Brazil living there for seventeen years. He wrote Tratado Descritivo do Brasil (A Descriptive Treatise of Brazil), published in 1587. This part encyclopaedia and part personal narrative describes flora and cultivated plants, gives an account of the culture of cotton, the medicinal qualities of tobacco and the so-called “trees reaes” or royal trees, trees of commercial value. It also covers native tribes. In 1591 he led an expedition along the São Francisco River.
