= Adélia Sampaio =

Brazilian filmmaker

Adélia Sampaio (born 1944) is a Brazilian filmmaker, the first black woman to direct a film in Brazil, the 1984 feature Amor Maldito (Cursed Love).

== Life and career ==
Sampaio was born in 1944 in Belo Horizonte; her mother was a domestic worker. She moved with her family to Rio de Janeiro when she was four years old. Sampaio's interest in film was encouraged by her sister Eliana, after watching Sergei Eisenstein's Ivan the Terrible at the movies; Eliana later became her producer. In 1969 went to work as a telephone operator at Difilm, a Brazilian distributor linked to Cinema Novo. Sampaio began to organize the company's film club, which projected films in 16mm. She also started to work in the production of films, in various functions, such as continuist, makeup artist, camera operator, editor and producer. Her debut as a director was in 1979, with the short film Denúncia Vazia.

In 1984 she released her first feature, Amor Maldito, based on the real-life case of a trial of a lesbian woman accused of killing her partner, of which she was also a screenwriter (with José Louzeiro) and producer. Thus, she became the first black woman to direct a feature film in Brazil. In 1987 she directed the documentary Fugindo do Passado: Um Drink para Tetéia e História Banal, about the Brazilian military dictatorship. In 2018 she directed O mundo de dentro, shown at the São Paulo International Short Film Festival.
