= Divine Shepherdess =

Divine Shepherdess or Divina Pastora may refer to:

- Cathedral of the Divine Shepherdess, seat of the Apostolic Vicariate of Tucupita, Venezuela
- Daughters of the Divine Shepherdess, a religious order founded by Manuel Míguez González
- Divina Pastora, a municipality in Brazil
- Divina Pastora (Barquisimeto), a statue in Barquisimeto, Venezuela
- National Shrine of Virgen La Divina Pastora, a church in the Philippines
- La Divina Pastora, a statue in Siparia, Trinidad
- Divine Shepherdess, patron saint of Cojedes, Venezuela, with multiple buildings, statues, and events

== See also ==
- Our Lady of the Good Shepherd (disambiguation)
