= Our Lady of the Good Shepherd =

Our Lady of the Good Shepherd is a title which refers to Mary, mother of Jesus, in connection with Jesus's role as the "Good Shepherd". This title and its variants may refer to:

- Congregation of Our Lady of Charity of the Good Shepherd, a French religious order
- Our Lady of the Good Shepherd Cathedral, Djibouti
- Feast of Our Lady Mother of the Good Shepherd, a feast day locally celebrated on or near the Third Sunday of Easter
- Parish Church of Our Lady of the Divine Shepherd, a church in Brazil
- Mother of the Good Shepherd

== See also ==
- Divine Shepherdess (disambiguation)
- Divina Pastora (Barquisimeto)
