= Convent of Bom Jesus dos Perdões and Chapel of Mercy =

Church and convent in Bahia, Brazil

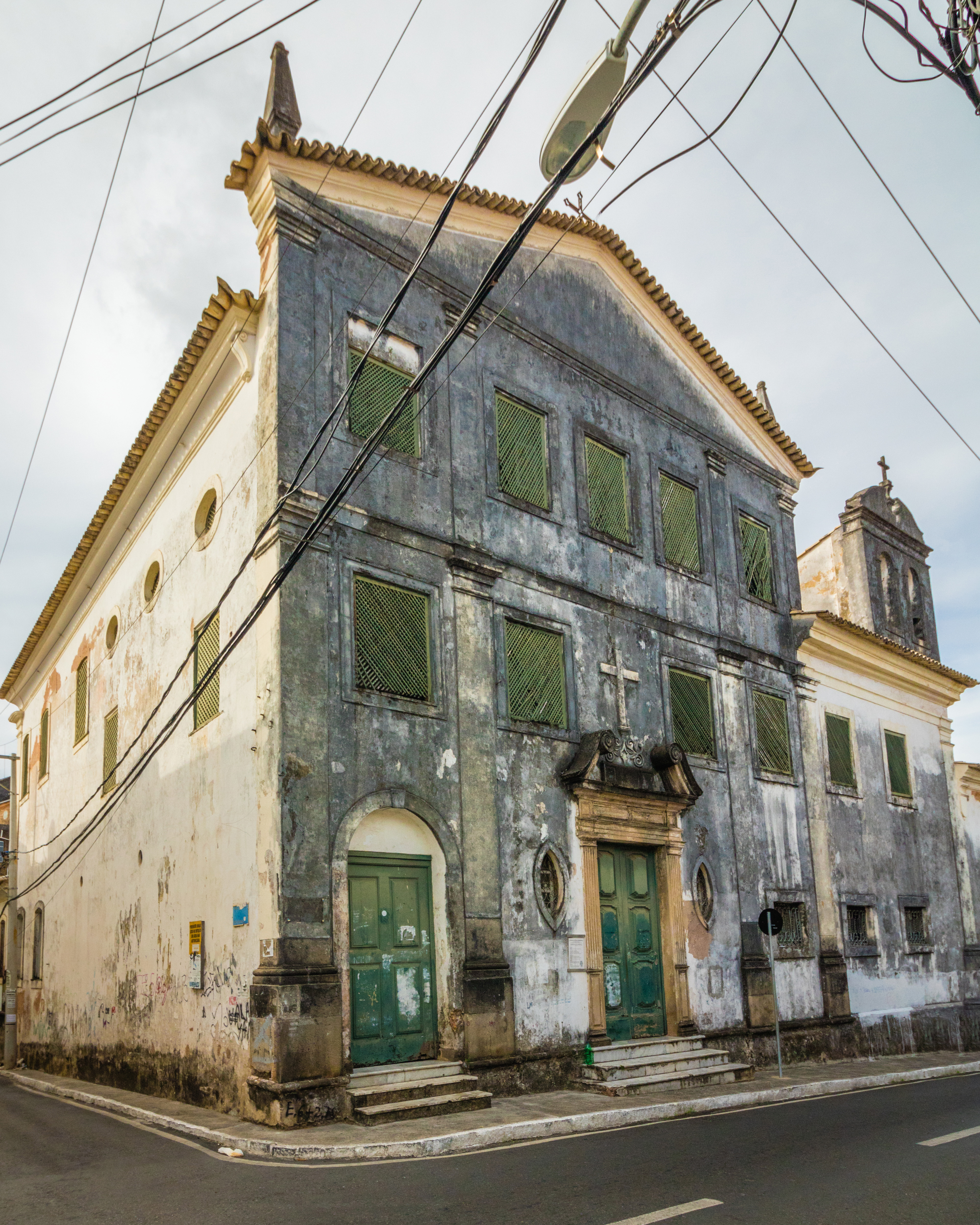
- Convent of Bom Jesus dos Perdões and Chapel of Mercy in Salvador

- Location of the Convent of Bom Jesus dos Perdões and Chapel of Mercy in Brazil

Religion
- Affiliation: Catholic
- Rite: Roman

Location
- Municipality: Salvador
- State: Bahia
- Country: Brazil
- Interactive map of Convent of Bom Jesus dos Perdões and Chapel of Mercy
- Coordinates: 12.9693°S 38.5028°W

Architecture
- Established: 1789

National Historic Heritage of Brazil
- Designated: 1943
- Reference no.: 264

The Convent of Bom Jesus dos Perdões and Chapel of Mercy (Portuguese: Capela de Nossa Senhora da Piedade e Recolhimento de Bom Jesus dos Perdões) is an 18th-century Roman Catholic church and convent located in Salvador, Bahia, Brazil. It was listed as a historic structure by National Institute of Historic and Artistic Heritage (IPHAN) in 1943 and is a contributing property of the Historic Center of Salvador UNESCO World Heritage Site.

== Location ==
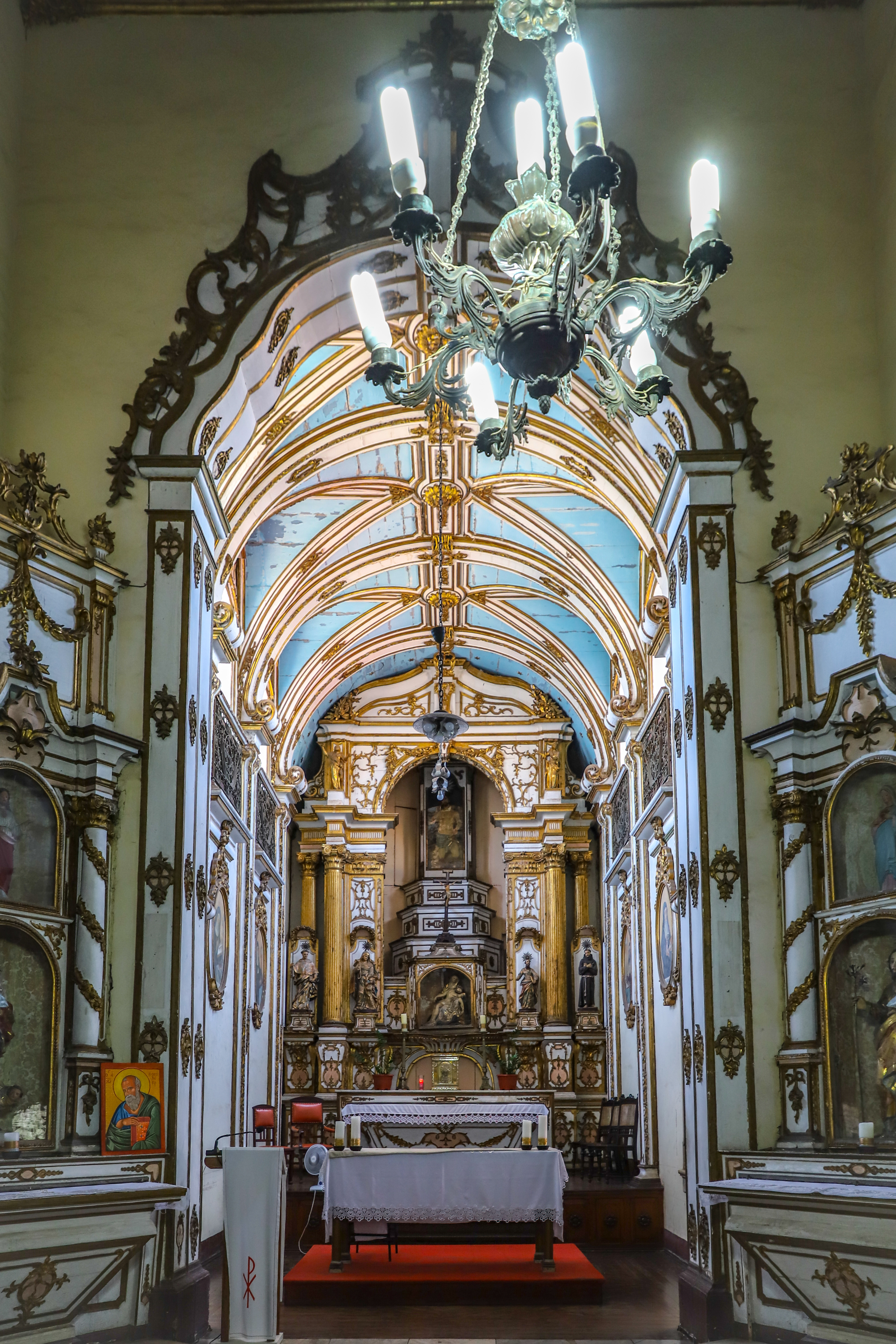
View of nave and chancel

The Convent of Bom Jesus dos Perdões was built on the first range of hills beyond the city center of Salvador. It sits on a narrow street, Rua dos Perdões below the Largo do Santo Antonio, a public square, and both the Church of Santo Antonio Além do Carmo and Forte de Santo Antônio Além do Carmo. The church and convent sit in a dense urban area of small houses and sobrados built at the end of the 19th century.

== History ==
Archbishop Luís Álvares gave permission for the construction of a small church and convent as early as 1732. Domingos do Rosario and Francisco Chagas built a chapel and dedicated to Our Lady of Mercy and a small convent dedicated to the Lord Good Jesus of Pardons. The L-shaped convent is the oldest part of the building. The chapel and convent were expanded in 1789 by Teodósio Gonçalves da Silva and his wife Ana de Souza Queiroz. The expansion included 40 new cells, a sacristy, tower, a refectory, kitchen, lobby, and bathrooms. This constructed continued until the early 19th century. The chapel was gilded in 1819. The convent was greatly modified in the 20th century; its early layout is now difficult to discern.

The building underwent numerous reforms in the 20th century. The building was used by the Legião Brasileira de Assistência in 1943, and a small pavilion was built in 1950. The painted in 1950, under the permission of IPHAN. The side wall and roofs of the nave and chancel were stabilized between 1959 and 1961; stabilization works were carried out again in 1962. The exterior was again painted in 1974 by IPHAN, but is now in a state of advanced decay.

== Structure ==
The chapel has a simple façade with a single portal with fluted pilasters, apparently modified in the 19th century in the Neoclassical style. The portal, which no longer aligns with the building after modifications in the 19th century, has a pediment with volutes and a cross at center; its design was inspired by that of the Church of Saint Michael, located to the south below the Pelourinho. Similar pediments can be found at Solar Ferrão, also in the Pelourinho; the building of the Museum of Art of Bahia and the Casa de Oração dos Jesuítas

The nave of the chapel has a single aisle on one side. Tribunes are along the single aisle with two choirs to the rear of the structure. The two-tiered choir resembles that of the chapel of the Santa Casa de Misericórdia. The convent has a high altar that dates to the late 18th century. Two altars are placed to either side of the chancel arch. The nave ceiling and choir ceiling paintings are attributed to José Teófilo de Jesus.

The convent has three stories: one built below street level with stories above. The convent has a narrow, rectangular courtyard.

== Protected status ==
The Convent of Bom Jesus dos Perdões and Chapel of Mercy was listed as a historic structure by the National Institute of Historic and Artistic Heritage in 1943. It was listed in the Book of Historical Works no. 264.

== Access ==
The church is open to the public and may be visited.
