= Parish Church of Our Lady of Victory =

Church in São Cristovão, Brazil

- Igreja Matriz de Nossa Senhora da Vitória
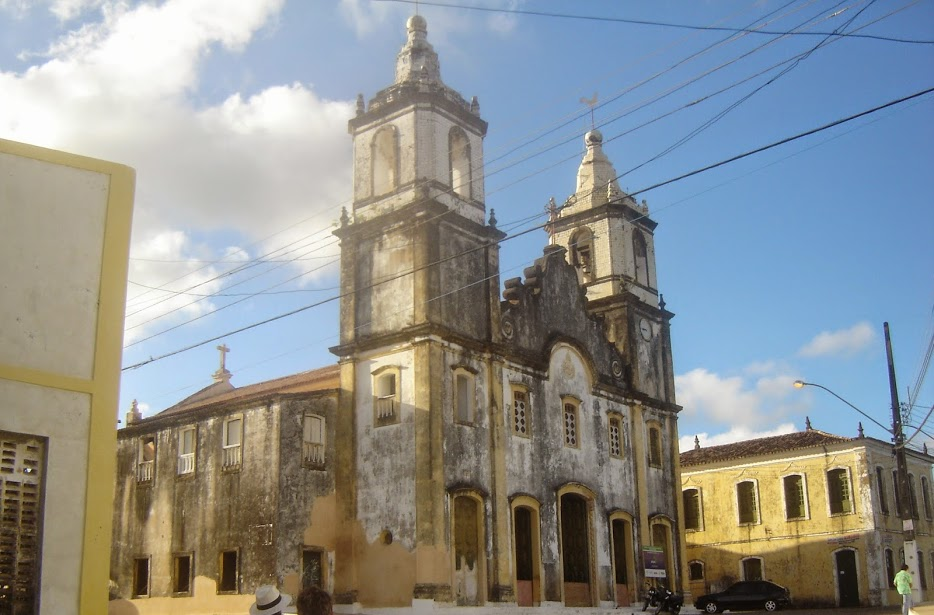
- Parish Church of Our Lady of Victory in São Cristóvão

- Location of the Parish Church of Our Lady of Victory in Brazil

Religion
- Affiliation: Catholic
- Rite: Roman

Location
- Municipality: São Cristóvão
- State: Sergipe
- Country: Brazil
- Interactive map of Parish Church of Our Lady of Victory
- Coordinates: 11.013998°S 37.207901°W

Architecture
- Direction of façade: East

The Parish Church of Our Lady of Victory (Portuguese: Igreja Matriz de Nossa Senhora da Vitória) is a 17th-century Roman Catholic church in São Cristóvão, Sergipe, Brazil. The church is one of the earliest remaining structures in both the municipality of São Cristóvão and the state of Sergipe; it is also one of the main elements of the UNESCO World Heritage Site of the São Francisco Square in the Town of São Cristóvão. The church is dedicated to Our Lady of Victory and remains home to an active congregation and belongs to the Archdiocese of Aracaju. While the church was constructed in 1608, it was heavily damaged during the Dutch occupation of São Cristóvão from 1637 to 1645. It was restored in the 17th century and subsequently modified in the 19th century. While the interior of the church is simple, it has paintings attributed to the artist José Teófilo de Jesus (1758-1847). The Parish Church of Our Lady of Victory was listed as a historic structure by the National Historic and Artistic Heritage Institute (IPHAN) in 1943.

== History ==
The Parish Church of Our Lady of Victory was the first parish church in Sergipe. Our Lady of Victory was built as a parish church in 1608 by Dom Constantino Barradas, the fourth Bishop of Bahia, during the pontificate of Pope Paul V. It was built under the direction of Jesuit brothers, and bears the crest of Philip IV of Spain as Brazil was a colony within the Iberian Union (1580-1640). The church was eventually elevated to an Episcopal See. It remained the only parish in Sergipe until the late 17th century; it remained the only link of the region between Bahia and also to Portugal. Priests periodically came from Salvador to teach and catechize in Sergipe.

The church reflects the sharp racial and social division of São Cristóvão in colonial Brazil: the church was reserved for white residents of Portuguese descent. Churches were later built in the town for mixed-race peoples and people of African descent. The church was heavily damaged during the eight years of Dutch rule in São Cristóvão, from 1637 to 1645; the city served alternately as a base for Portuguese guerillas and as a seat of power for the Dutch. São Cristóvão had 400 inhabitants at beginning of the Dutch conflict; it was in complete ruins at the end.

São Cristóvão was greatly expanded after the end of Dutch rule and Our Lady of Victory was reconstructed by residents of the town. The town sent an appeal to the King Peter II of Portugal for money for a full renovation of the church in 1666, and eventually received 4,000 cruzados in 1702. Our Lady of Victory served as a nucleus for the construction of other religious structures in São Cristóvão in the 17th century. Its renovation was followed by the construction of the Church and Convent of Santa Cruz (Convent of San Francisco) (1693), the Convent and Church of the Order of Carmo (1699), Misericórdia Hospital and Church and the Church of Our Lady of the Rosary of Black Men (1743).

The church was significantly renovated in the 19th century. The first alterations were made in 1837. White tiles were placed on the upper parts of the towers in 1845 and 1855. The domes of the bell towers date to the same period. The interior was modified in the same period; decorative features of the nave were removed, and aisles were added. The chancel and altars are in the Neoclassical style of the 19th century, in white with gilded wood carving. German Franciscan fathers arrived in São Cristóvão in the late 19th century. Father Joaquim Benke supervised reforms of the church building in 1910, and Friar José Pohlmann in 1917.

== Structure ==
Our Lady of Victory was constructed on the side of a hill on the highest point in the city. Due to its prestige, it formed part of the upper city (cidade alta), in contrast the poorer lower city (cidade baixa). It opens to Praça da Matriz, a broad public plaza, now known as Praça Getulio. It has an imposing façade flanked by two bell towers with belfries covered in white Portuguese tile. Each belfry is topped by a tiled dome with a ball finial. The lower level of the church has three portals at center with corresponding portals to each bell tower. Three sash windows are at the upper, or choir level, corresponding to the portals before. These are surmounted by a massive pediment with volutes. The doors of the church are of carved, decorated wood. The interior of the church is simple with paintings attributed to José Teófilo de Jesus (1758-1847). The chancel arch has two angels and an image of Saint Christopher in limestone.

== Protected status ==
The Parish Church of Our Lady of Victory was listed as a historic structure by the National Historic and Artistic Heritage Institute (IPHAN) in 1976. The structures were registered under the Book of Historical Works, Inscription 263-A and Book of Fine Arts, Inscription fls. 57. Both directives are dated March 20, 1943.

== Access ==
The church is open to the public and may be visited.

== See also ==
- Church of Our Lady of the Rosary of Black Men
- Church of Our Lady of Protection
- Church of the Third Order of Mount Carmel
- Church and Convent of Santa Cruz
- Misericórdia Hospital and Church
