= Mother of the Good Shepherd =

Title of Mary, mother of Jesus

Our Lady, Mother of the Good Shepherd (French: Notre Dame de Brebières), or The Divine Shepherdess (French: Le Divine Bergère) is a title of Mary, mother of Jesus from France. The feast day associated with this title is September 3.

== Two Origins ==
The title is based on a statue found in the town of Albert, Somme, France. The history of this French source of the title dates back to legendary sources in the 12th century of a statue miraculously found by a shepherd. A French Franciscan Poor Clare, Colette of Corbie (1380-1447), helped spread devotion to Notre Dame de Brebieres.

The devotion also is found in the 18th-century writings of Capuchin Franciscans in Spain: In the year 1703, Brother Isidore of Sevilla, a very popular preacher, was inspired to carry with him a banner with a very particular representation of the Blessed Virgin Mary: dressed in the humble clothes of a shepherdess, sitting on a rock, wearing an ordinary wide-brimmed hat, surrounded by lambs.

A pious devotion developed around this portrayal of Mary which first spread through Spain and later in Latin America. Devotion to Mary as a "Shepherdess of Souls," also known as the "Divine Shepherdess," expanded rapidly with the creation of many pious groups of the faithful. They became known as Mary’s Flock. Divina Pastora in Venezuela is one example.

The Capuchin province of Central Canada is named after Mary, Mother of the Good Shepherd. To this day all Capuchin missions around the world are entrusted to Our Lady of the Good Shepherd:

"We entrust this great undertaking to the intercession of the Blessed Virgin Mary, Mother of the Good Shepherd, who gave birth to Christ, the light and salvation of all nations, and who, on the morning of Pentecost, overshadowed by the Holy Spirit, presided in prayer at the dawn of evangelization."

== Feast day ==
While this feast is not celebrated on the universal calendar of the Catholic Church, some Spanish-speaking countries and the Philippines have various traditions and processions connected to this devotion, in addition to the French devotion. Some would commemorate this title on the Saturday before the Third Sunday of Easter, commonly called "Sunday of the Good Shepherd."

While this describes the Franciscan devotion, the title is found in the ancient Akathist Hymn:

Hail Mary! Mother of the Lamb and of the Good Shepherd; Hail, fold for the sheep of his pasture. Intercede for us with the Lord.
