= Church of Saint Michael (Salvador) =

18th-century church in Bahia, Brazil

- Igreja de São Miguel
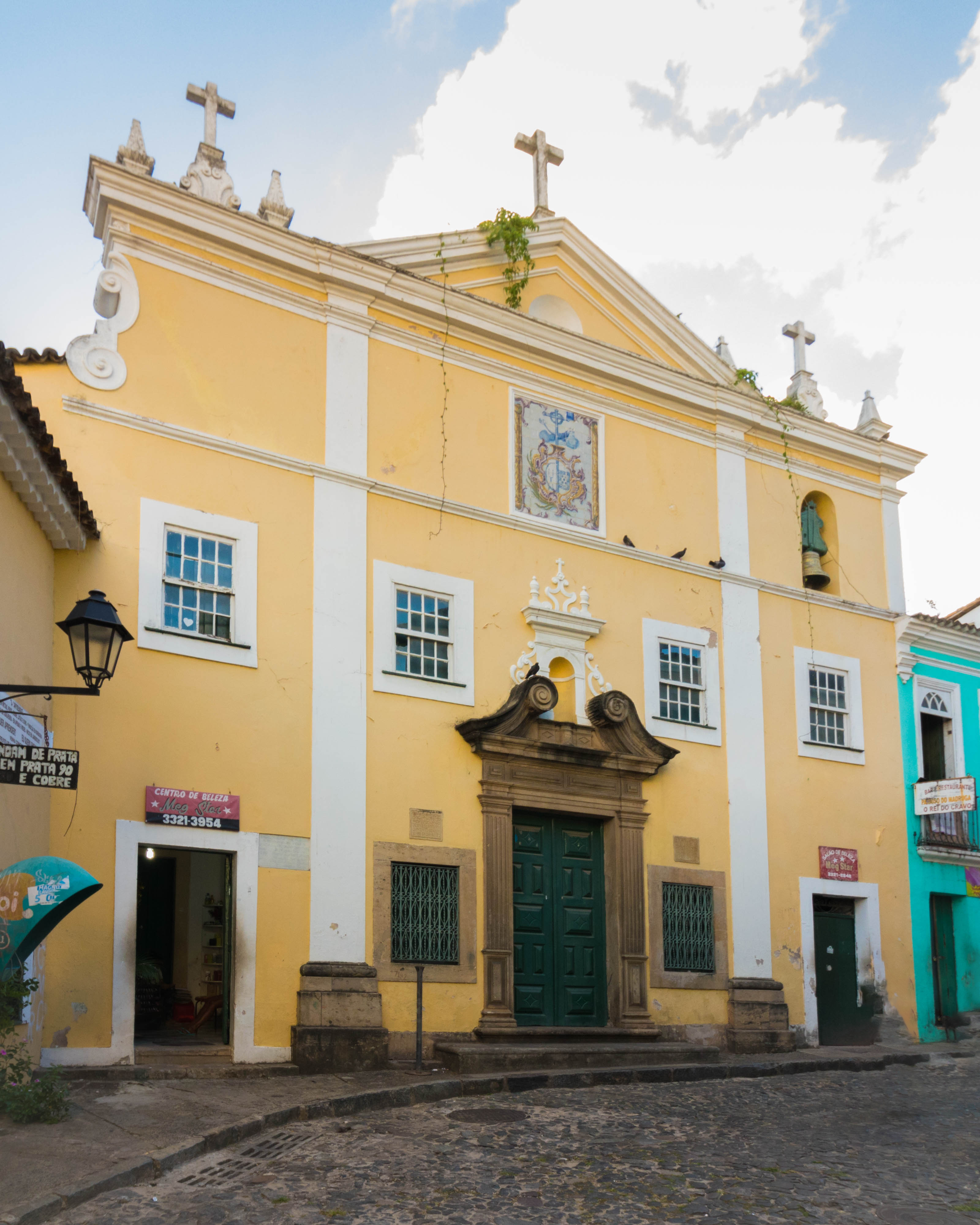
- Church of Saint Michael, Salvador, Bahia, Brazil

- Location of the Church of Saint Michael in Brazil Church of Saint Michael (Salvador) (South America)

Religion
- Affiliation: Catholic
- Rite: Roman

Location
- Municipality: Salvador
- State: Bahia
- Country: Brazil
- Interactive map of Church of Saint Michael
- Coordinates: 12.97414°S 38.50779°W

Architecture
- Established: 1732
- Direction of façade: West

National Historic Heritage of Brazil
- Designated: 1938
- Reference no.: 89

The Church of Saint Michael (Portuguese: Igreja de São Miguel), formerly known as the Capela do Senhor Bom Jesus da Via Sacra e São Miguel, is an 18th-century Roman Catholic church and former convent in Salvador, Bahia, Brazil. The church is dedicated, as evidenced by its original name, to Our Lord Jesus Crucified of the Via Sacra and Saint Michael the Archange. The church was donated to the Third Order of Saint Francis in 1744. It was listed as a historic structure by the National Historic and Artistic Heritage Institute in 1938.

== Location ==
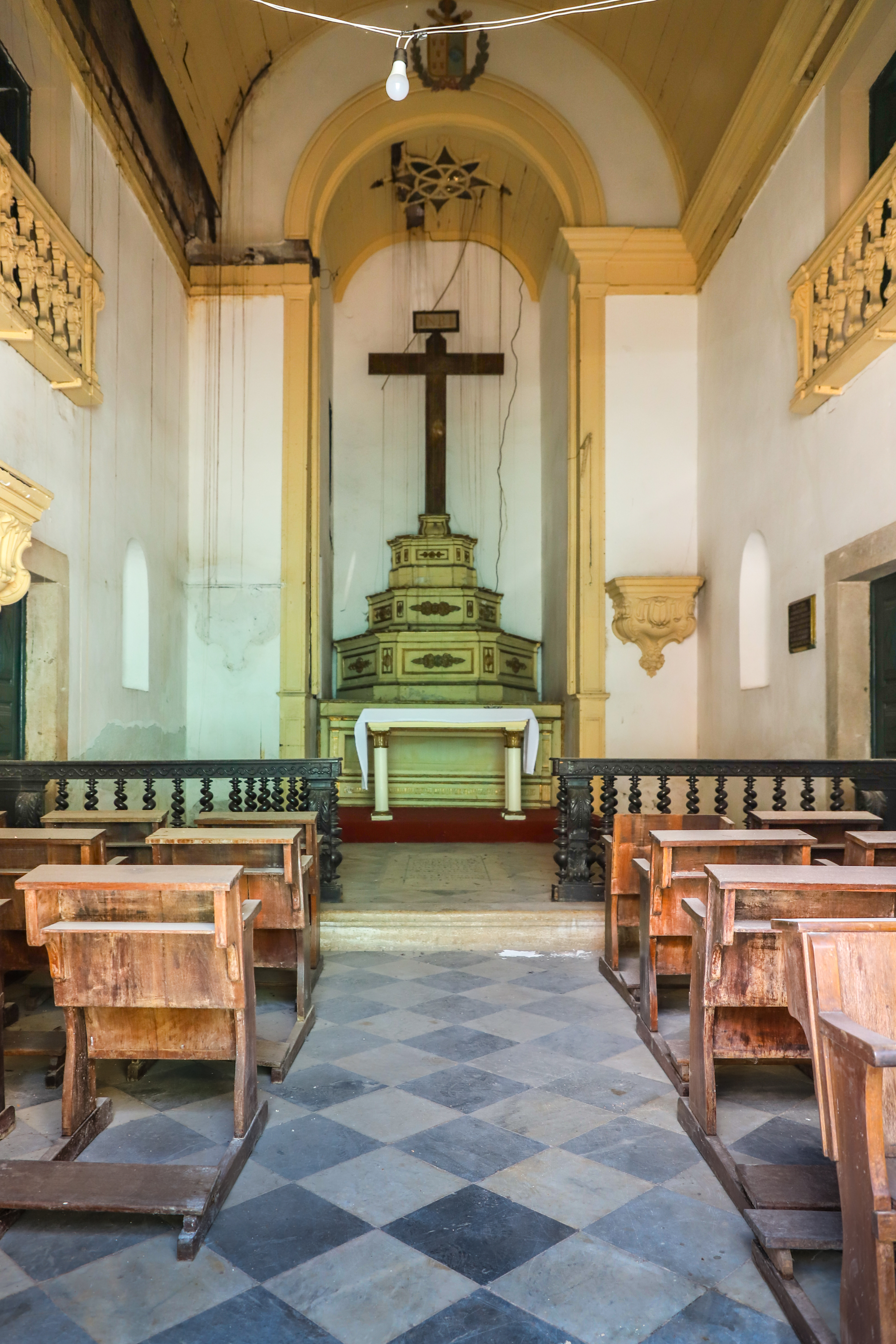
View of nave and chancel

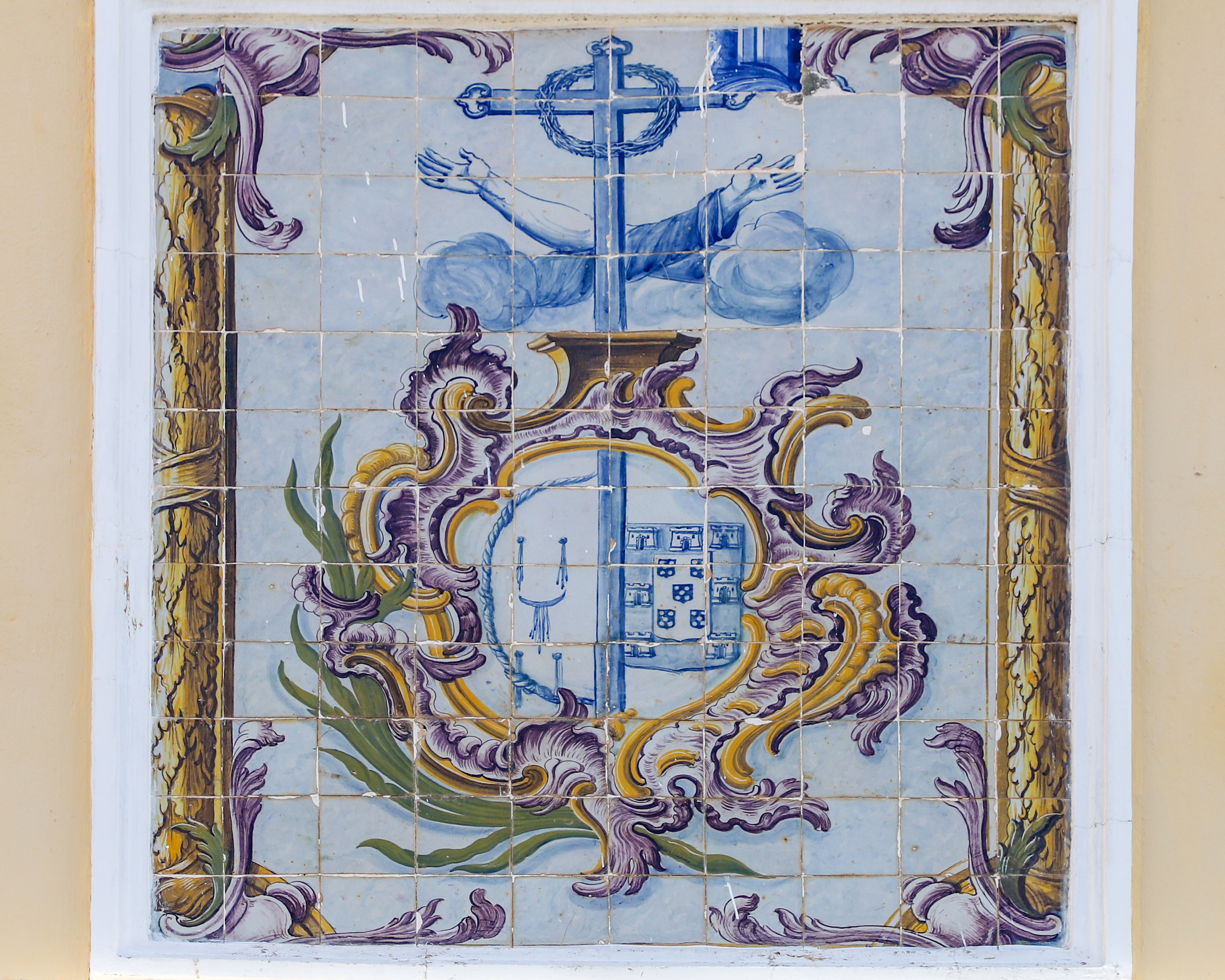
Polychromatic panel of azuejos with emblem of the Third Order of Saint Francis

The Church of Saint Michael is located within the Historic Center of Salvador. It sits in close alignment to Rua Frei Vicente, a cobblestone street that connects the Pelourinho to Baixa dos Sapateiros. The church is surrounded by 19th century houses.

== History ==
Francisco Gomes do Rego, a member of the Third Order of Saint Francis, donated land for the construction of the Church of Saint Michael. Construction of the church began in 1725 as a house of prayer. It was completed in 1732 by Francisco Rego as a church. The church, adjacent house, and 33 other houses were donated to the Third Order of Saint Francis after Rego's death in 1745. His ornate tombstone in the church has the inscription Francisco, great sinner and unworthy founder of this chapel, asks for mercy from brother of the Third Order. The Third Order installed a panel of azulejo tiles with an emblem of the order in approximately 1790.

== Structure ==
The Church of Saint Michael has a façade with a triangular pediment. The façade is divided into two sections horizontally below the pediment and three sections vertically by means of simple white pilasters. The lower horizontal section is quite high and the upper much smaller. An elaborate portal at center of the façade is in carved stone, with a baroque-style triangular pediment with volutes. A nice is located above the monumental portal between two choir windows. An image of the Virgin Mary sat in the niche, but is now removed. The church has four windows at the choir level, two of which open to the choir. A belfry is located at the left of the upper section of the church, at the same level of the panel of azulejos. The belfry has two openings, one to Rua Frei Vicente and one to the west. A single bell remains in the church.

A rectangular panel of polychromatic azulejo tiles is situated above the portal. It was produced in Lisbon between 1780 and 1790, and is composed of 120 tiles, 10 high by 12 across. The panel is polychromatic, in blue, green, yellow, and purple on a faint blue background. It depicts the emblem of the Third Order of Saint Francis at center framed by rococo-style festoons.

=== Interior ===
The interior of the church has a rectangular nave with a choir and chancel, side aisles and tribunes, a sacristy, and smaller miscellaneous rooms. Both the nave and chancel have barrel-vaulted ceilings; their original paintings are now lost, and are simply painted yellow. The altar originally had an image of the Our Lord Jesus of Bouças; it was replaced in 1854 by an image of Christ Crucified from the collection of the Church of the Third Order of Saint Francis in 1854. An image of Saint Michael sat below. The altar rail is of finely carved jacaranda with floral motifs. While much smaller in scale, the altar rail resembles those of the Church and Convent of São Francisco and Church of the Third Order of Mount Carmel.

The lioz tombstone of Francisco Gomes do Rego sits in front of the altar at the center of the floor of the chancel. The choir is narrow with a simple wood rail.

== Protected status ==
The Church of Saint Michael was listed as a historic structure by the National Historic and Artistic Heritage Institute in 1938. The structures were registered under the Book of Historical Works, Inscription no. 89.

== Access ==
The Church of Saint Michael is closed to the public and may not be visited.
