= Church of the Third Order of Mount Carmel =

Roman Catholic church in Bahia, Brazil

- Igreja da Ordem Terceira do Carmo
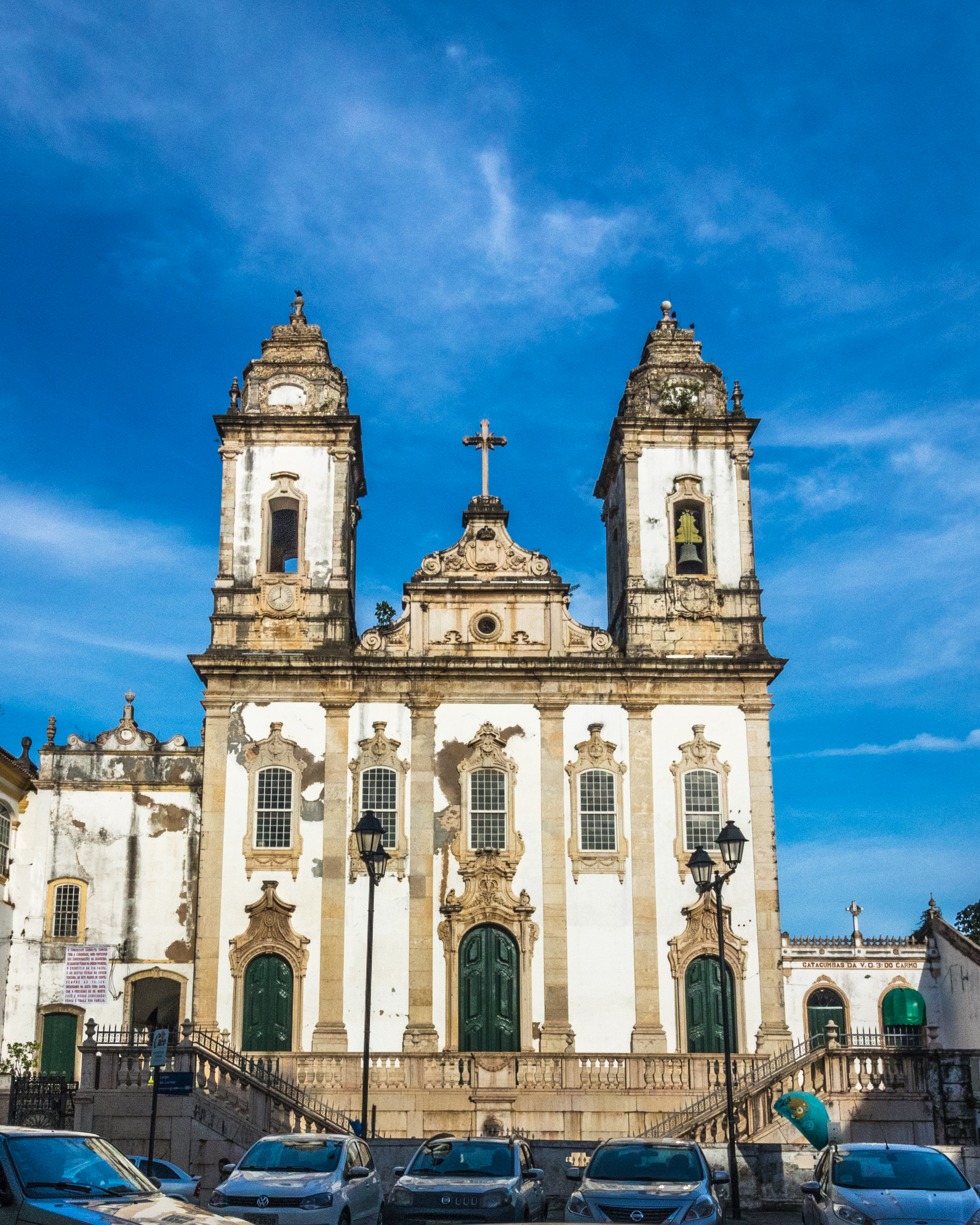
- Facade of the Church of the Third Order of Mount Carmel

- Location of the Church of the Third Order of Mount Carmel in Brazil

Religion
- Affiliation: Catholic
- Rite: Roman

Location
- Municipality: Salvador
- State: Bahia
- Country: Brazil
- Coordinates: 12.969201°S 38.507507°W

Architecture
- Style: Baroque
- Established: ca. 1644
- Completed: 1855

National Historic Heritage of Brazil
- Designated: 1938
- Reference no.: 82

The Church of the Third Order of Mount Carmel (Portuguese: Igreja da Ordem Terceira do Carmo, also known as the Igreja da Ordem Terceira do Monte do Carmo) is an 18th-century Roman Catholic church in Salvador, Bahia, Brazil. It is located adjacent to the Church and Convent of Our Lady of Mount Carmel (Igreja e Convento de Nossa Senhora do Carmo). Work on the church began in 1644. It was destroyed by fire in 1788 and subsequently rebuilt. The church is a large complex consisting of a nave, chancel, choir, corridors, tribunes, meeting rooms, and a sacristy. The interior was richly decorated in the 18th century; the painting of the ceiling of the nave is the first major work by José Teófilo de Jesus. The Church of the Third Order of Mount Carmel was listed as a historic structure by National Institute of Historic and Artistic Heritage (IPHAN) in 1938 and is part of the Historic Center of Salvador UNESCO World Heritage Site.

== History ==
The Third Order of Mount Carmel was founded in Portugal in 1629, following the establishment of the Carmelites in Portugal in 1251. The Third Order of Mount Carmel in Salvador was established in 1636 in Bahia by Pedro Alves Botelho, a wholesale trader; Pedro da Silva, 1st Count of São Lourenço, the governor of Bahia, was its first prior. Third Third Order Brotherhood was restricted to members of "pure" Portuguese descent, wealthy, and without Jewish ancestry. It was rivalled in size only by the Third Order Brotherhood of Saint Francis. The Carmelite brotherhood gave preference to merchants, while the Franciscans gave preference to "intellectuals." The order held a great religious procession in Salvador on Good Friday from the 17th century, one of many elaborate processions in the city. The procession once included members of other brotherhoods, but was reduced to the Carmelite brotherhood in the 19th due to quarreling among the Third Order brotherhoods in Salvador.

Construction of the first church structure began in 1644 with permission from the Convent of Our Lady of Mount Carmel; the land was donated by residents of Salvador. The brotherhood was recognized by a papal bull on December 12, 1695, under the name of "Venerável Ordem Terceira da Mãe Santíssima e Soberana Senhora do Monte do Carmo", or the Venerable Third Order of the Holy Mother and Sovereign Lady of Monte do Carmo. The master woodcarver Lourenço Rodrigues Lançarote completed extensive work on the church between 1733 and 1734; he later carved the ornate side altars of the Basilica of the Immaculate Conception, Salvador.

The church was destroyed by fire on the night of March 21, 1788. The building was completely destroyed, but numerous images and other artwork were saved or salvaged from the building. The order began reconstruction of the church in 1788, the same year of the fire, but was delayed by a lack of funds through the 19th century. Work began on the current structure in 1803. Due to lack of funds, its façade in lioz from Portugal was only completed in 1855. A second bell tower was added at the same time; the work continued five years to completion. The interior of the church was richly decorated, and completed at the end of the 19th century. Manoel Inácio da Costa sculpted six scenes of the Passion of Jesus, and José Teófilo de Jesus completed the monumental painting of the nave ceiling. A severe collapse of the cornice of the nave to the chancel arch occurred on September 7, 1882. The church was closed until 1984 for the repair of the choir and side altars.

== Structure ==
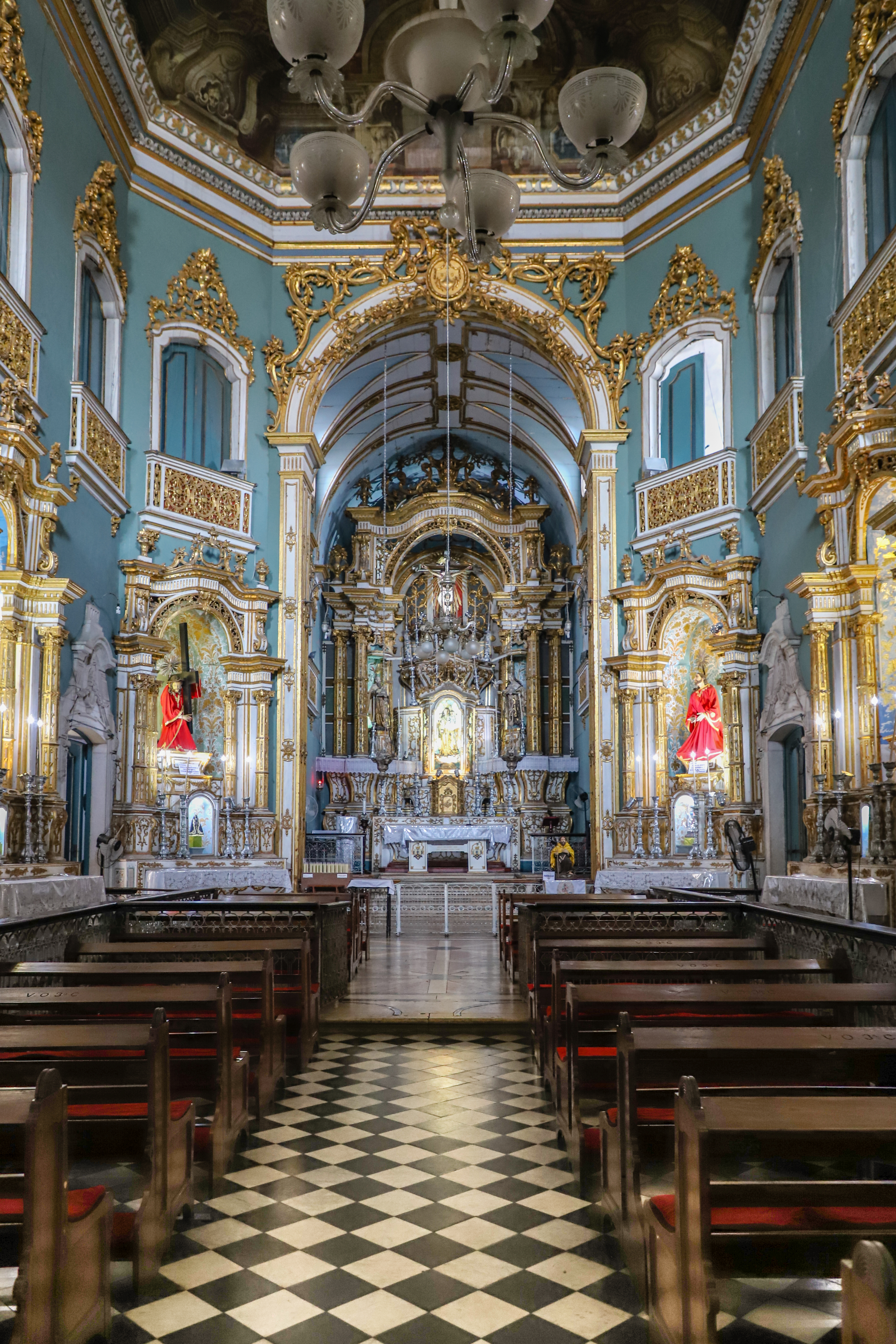
View of nave and chancel

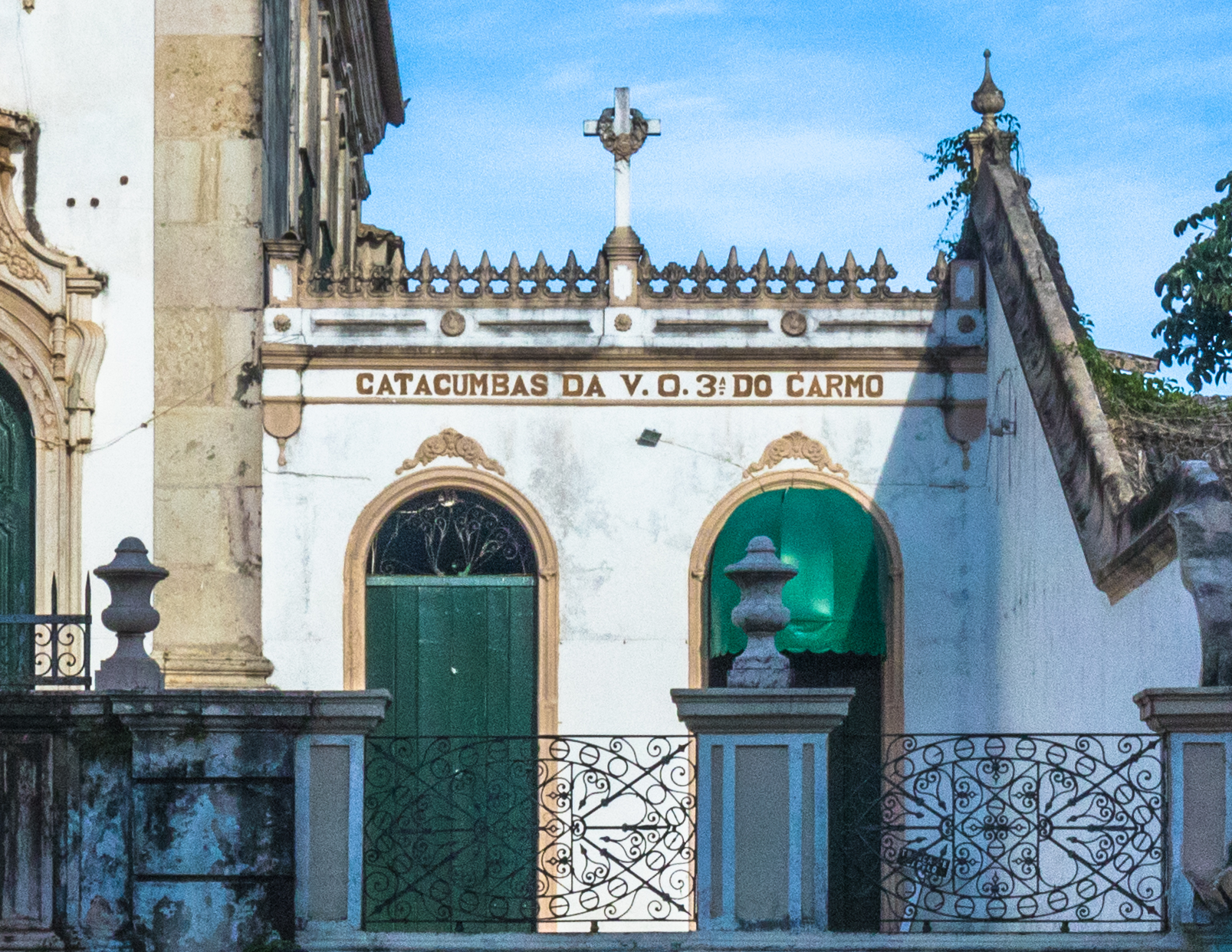
Catacombs of the Third Order of Mount Carmel

The Church of the Third Order of Mount Carmel sits at the top of Ladeira do Carmo, a street leading north from the main squares of the Pelourinho. It is in close proximity to the Church of the Blessed Sacrament at Rua do Passo. The structure, of brick and stone masonry, is slightly set back from street level and is approached via a large staircase in stone. The structure is built around two courtyards. Its plan is vast in scale and consists of the church and sacristy, an ossuary, a consistory room (casa da mesa), and a house of saints (casa dos santos). The galleries are glazed.

=== Exterior ===
The exterior of the church features a staircase, two towers with a frontispiece and pilasters, doorways of lioz stone. The style of the facade is eclectic; it has both Neoclassical elements of the period and Roccoco elements common to other churches in the Pelourinho. The facade is crowned by a cross and a relief of the coat of arms of the Carmelites. The decorative elements of the towers were considered old-fashioned at the time.

=== Interior ===
The floor plan of Church of the Third Order of Mount Carmel is typical of eighteenth-century Bahian religious architecture. It has a single nave, side altars, side aisles with tribunes, a chancel, and a sacristy. The sacristy provides access to the ossuary in the lower level. The interior of the church is in the Neoclassical style, common to both church architecture in Salvador and across Brazil in the 18th century. The chancel arch is high, with straight columns with capitals. It is white with talha dourado, or gilded woodwork, and surmounted by a small cartouche with the emblem of the Carmelite order. The nave has an organ imported from France. The principal work of the church is cedar carving of Christ inlaid with rubies; the rubies represent 2,000 drops of blood. It is the work of Francisco Xavier Chagas and dates to 1730. The statue of Our Lady of Mount Carmel on the altar is said to be a likeness of Isabel II, daughter of Garcia d'Ávila. Gilding in the nave and chancel was completed by Manuel Vaz da Costa (1831–1902) in the late 19th century; Euclides Teles da Cruz (1848–1904) restored the altar and central images in the same period.

==== Nave ceiling ====
The painting of the ceiling of the nave and gilded woodwork was executed by José Teófilo de Jesus and between 1815 and 1817. The figurative painting consists of a central image, Virgem entregando o escapulário a Santa Teresa e a Santo Elias, da Ordem Carmelitana, cercada de um Coro de arcanjos ("English: Virgin delivering the scapular to St. Teresa and St. Elias, of the Carmelite Order, surrounded by a Choir of Archangels"). The central image is surrounded by medallions featuring Carmelite saints. Teófilo de Jesus hired assistants to complete the gilded woodwork and focused primarily on the painting. The nave ceiling painting of the Church of the Third Order was the artist's first major commission, and led to similar work at the Convent of Bom Jesus dos Perdões and Chapel of Mercy in 1819. The painting was restored in the late 19th century by José Antônio da Cunha Couto (1832–1894).

== Notable artwork ==
- Apresentação do Menino Jesus no Templo (panel painting in the sacristy), ca. 1730, José Pinhão de Matos.
- Nossa Senhora do Carmo entregando o escapulário a Santa Teresa D'Ávila e a São João da Cruz (nave ceiling), ca. 1815–1817, José Teófilo de Jesus
- Senhor Assentado na Pedra, attributed to Francisco das Chagas
- Senhor com a Cruz às Costas, attributed to Francisco das Chagas
- Senhor Crucificado, attributed to Francisco das Chagas
- Santo Elias, José Antônio da Cunha Couto
- Santa Teresa, José Antônio da Cunha Couto
- A Virgem, José Antônio da Cunha Couto, a reproduction of a painting by Bartolomé Esteban Murillo

== Protected status ==
The Church of the Third Order of Mount Carmel was listed as a historic structure by the National Institute of Historic and Artistic Heritage in 1938. It is listed in the Book of Historical Works process no. 82.

== Access ==
The church is open to the public and may be visited.

== See also ==
- Church of the Third Order of Mount Carmel, São Cristóvão
