= Parish Church of Our Lady of the Divine Shepherd =

Church building in Divina Pastora, Brazil

- Igreja Matriz de Nossa Senhora Divina Pastora
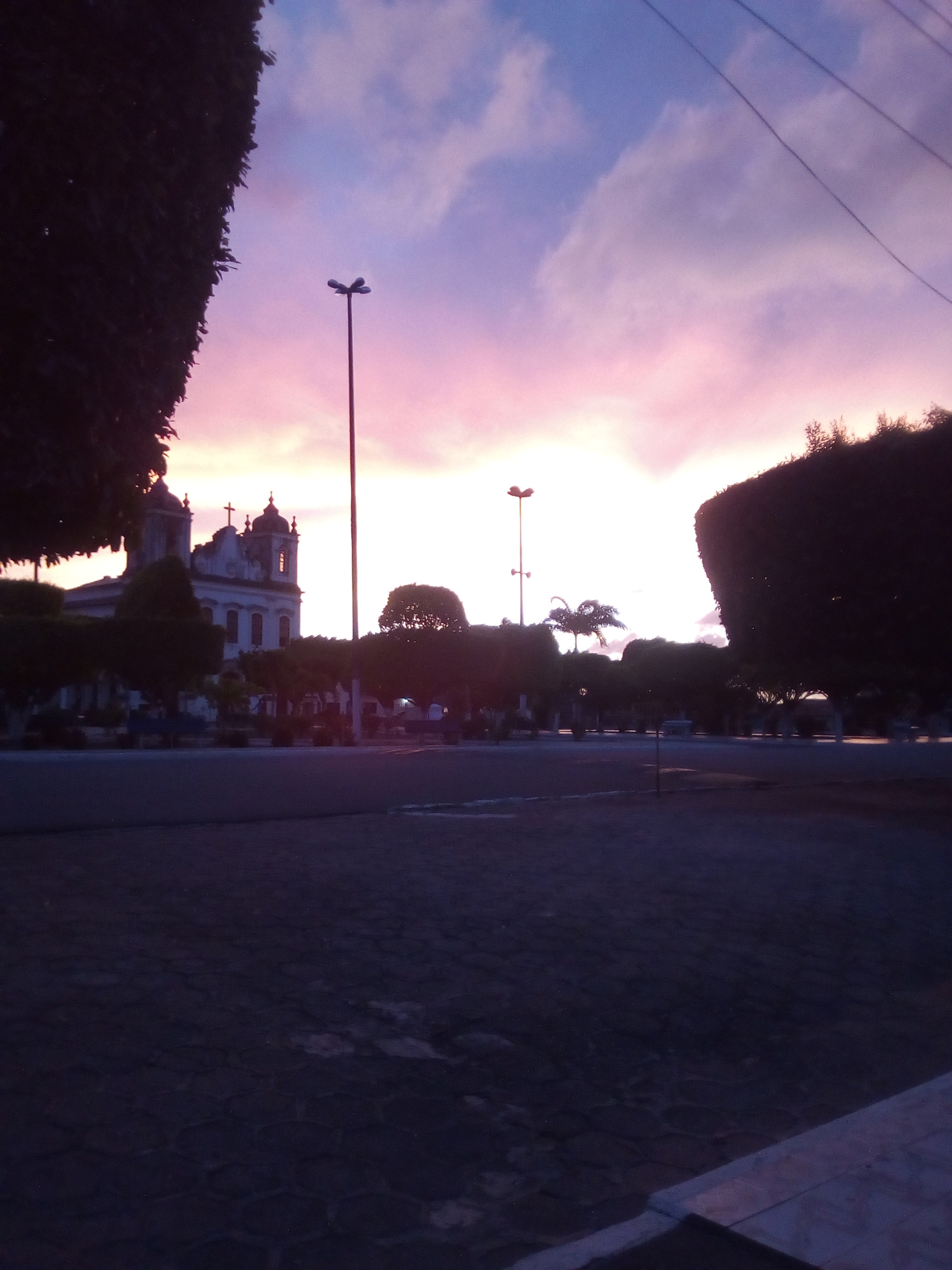

- Location in Brazil

Religion
- Affiliation: Catholic
- Rite: Roman Rite
- Status: Active

Location
- Municipality: Divina Pastora
- State: Sergipe
- Country: Brazil
- Interactive map of Parish Church of Our Lady of the Divine Shepherd
- Coordinates: 10°40′45.45″S 37°8′52.83″W

Architecture
- Style: Baroque
- Direction of façade: Northwest

National Historic Heritage of Brazil
- Designated: 1943
- Reference no.: 195

The Parish Church of Our Lady of the Divine Shepherd (Portuguese: Igreja Matriz de Nossa Senhora Divina Pastora, also Igreja Matriz da Divina Pastora) is an 18th-century Roman Catholic church in the city of Divina Pastora, Sergipe, Brazil. The church venerates the Blessed Virgin Mary under her title Our Lady of the Divine Shepherd, also known as the Divina Pastora. The church is located approximately 39 kilometres (24 mi) from the state capital of Aracaju at the east of the city center of Divina Pastora.

== Architecture ==
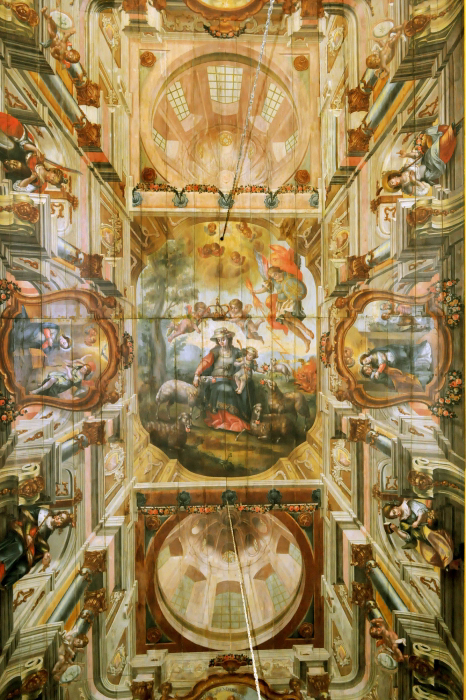
Ceiling painted by José Teófilo de Jesus

The date 1782 is inscribed on the façade of the church, indicating its probable date of completion.

The frontispiece of the church is typical of Jesuit church architecture of the Northeast Region of Brazil. Divina Pastora is noted for its artwork by the Bahian artist José Teófilo de Jesus (1758-1847), who created a perspective painting on the ceiling of the nave depicting the Divina Pastora. Porticos along the exterior of the nave were created to shelter pilgrims. Similar porticos are found at Church of Nosso Senhor do Bonfim, Salvador, constructed in 1740 in Salvador, Bahia.

== Protected status ==
The parish church was listed as a historic structure by National Institute of Historic and Artistic Heritage (IPHAN) in 1943. Both the structure and its contents were included in the IPHAN directive, which include Book of Historical Works, Inscription 195 and Book of Fine Arts, Inscription 261-A. Both directives are dated March 20, 1943.

== See also ==
- Catholic Church in Brazil
