= Lavagem do Bonfim =

Brazilian religious celebration

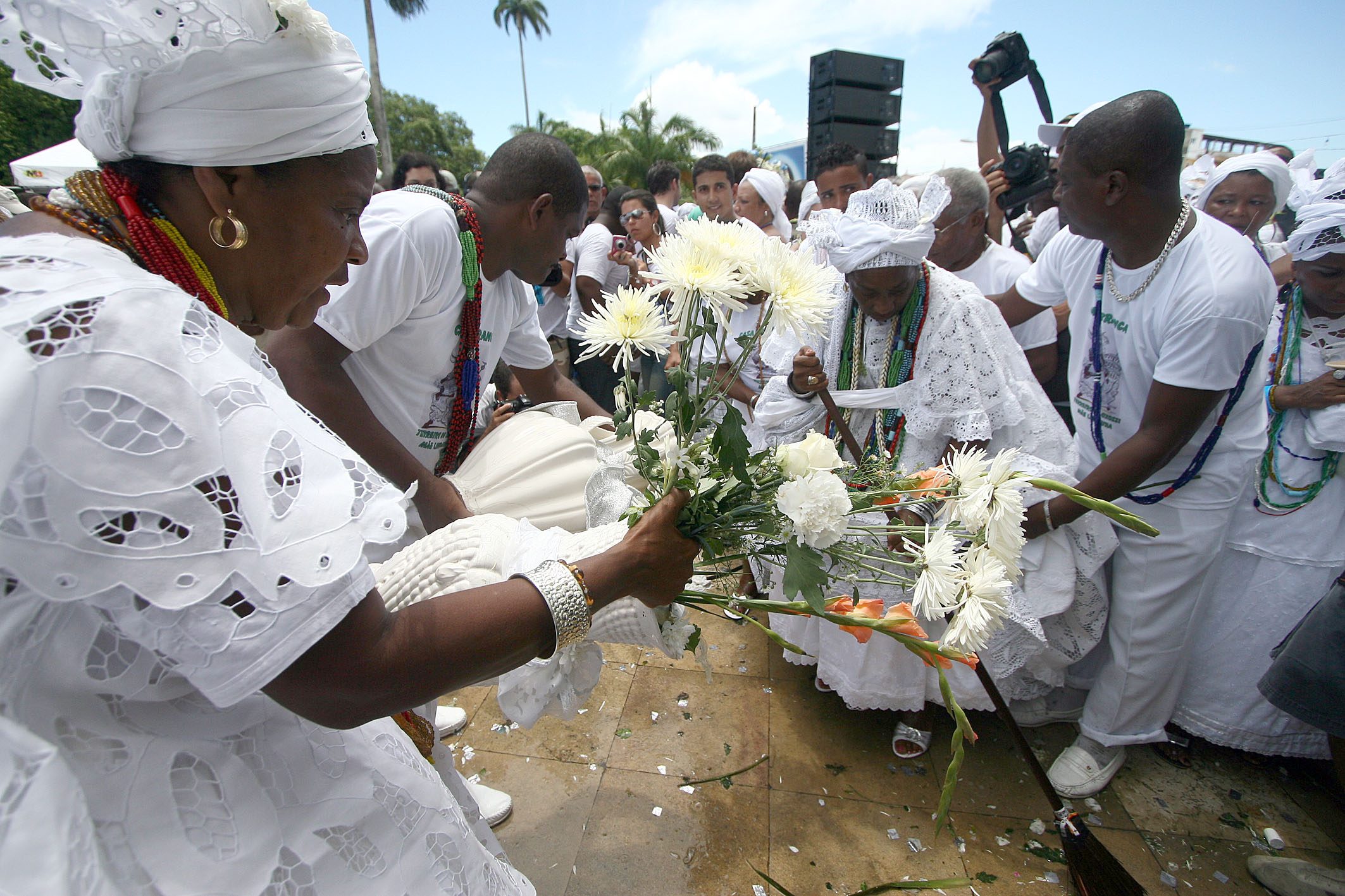
- Lavagem do Bonfim in 2010
- Observed by: Catholics; Candomblecists
- Liturgical color: White
- Type: Cultural; Historic
- Date: Thursday before the second Sunday after Three Kings' Day
- Frequency: Annual

The Lavagem do Bonfim (English: Washing of the Bonfim) is an inter-religious celebration that is celebrated in the Brazilian city of Salvador, in the state of Bahia, during the month of January, on the Thursday before the second Sunday after Three Kings' Day. In the same period, there is also a solemn novenary and exposition of the Blessed Sacrament, interrupted only on the day of the washing, when there is a procession between the Basilica of the Conception and the Church of Our Lord of Bonfim, along with the exposition of a small image of Our Lord of Bonfim on the facade of the temple by the church chaplain and a special blessing for all those present. The traditional washing should not be confused with the Festa do Bonfim (English: Feast of Bonfim), event that concludes the novenary on the following Sunday, when mass is celebrated to the saint.

The event began in 1773, when the members of the Devotion of Our Lord of Bonfim, composed of lay devotees, forced the enslaved to wash and decorate the church as part of the preparations for the feast. Later, for Candomblé followers, the Lavagem do Bonfim became part of the ceremony of the Waters of Oxalá. Afterwards, the Archdiocese of Salvador banned washing inside the church and moved the ritual to the steps and churchyard. During the traditional washing, the doors of the church remain closed and the baianas pour scented water on the steps and in the churchyard to the sound of Afro-religious songs and chants (although the ritual now has an ecumenical aspect).

== Origin ==
Teodósio Rodrigues de Farias, an officer in the Portuguese Navy, brought from Lisbon an image of Christ which, in 1745, was taken with great fanfare to the Basilica Sanctuary of Our Lady of Penha, in Itapagipe, in the city of Salvador. In July 1754, the image was transferred in procession to its own church on the Colina Sagrada, where the attribution of miraculous powers made Our Lord of Bonfim an object of popular devotion and a center of mystical and syncretic pilgrimage.

== The procession ==
The Lavagem do Bonfim begins with the traditional procession of baianas departing from the Basilica of the Conception on Thursday morning to the top of Bonfim. Everyone dresses in white, the color of the orisha, and walks 8 kilometers in procession from Largo da Conceição to Largo do Bonfim.

The highlight of the celebration is when the steps of the church are washed by around 200 baianas dressed in character who, from their "quartinhas" - pots that they carry on their shoulders - pour water onto the steps and into the church atrium, to the sound of clapping, drumming and chants of African origin. Once the religious part is over, the festivities continue in Largo do Bonfim, with batucadas, dances and stalls selling drinks and typical food.

On the Sunday after the washing, the devotees gather at the Church of Our Lady of the Seas for the procession of the Three Requests, which runs along the Largo de Roma towards Bonfim. On arrival at Colina Sagrada, the faithful circle the Basilica three times and make three requests. A sermon, a solemn mass and the blessing of the Blessed Sacrament end the celebration.

== See also ==
- Afro-Brazilian culture
- Syncretism
