= Cathedral of Our Lady of Mount Carmel, Barquisimeto =

Roman Catholic cathedral in Barquisimeto, Venezuela

Coordinates: 10.0736°N 69.3215°W

Barquisimeto Metropolitan Cathedral Catedral Metropolitana de Barquisimeto
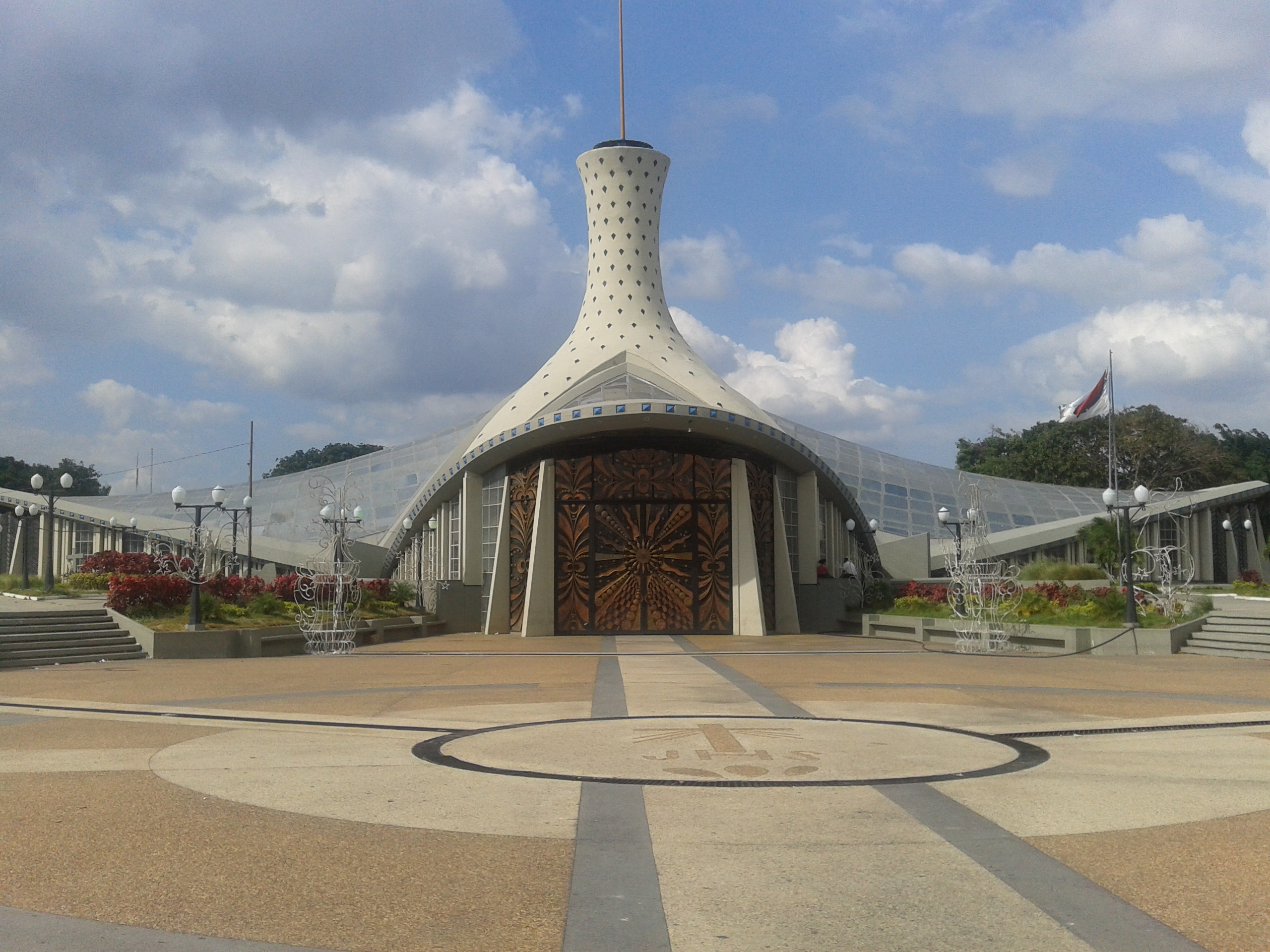

Religion
- Affiliation: Roman Catholic

Location
- Location: Barquisimeto, Venezuela
- Interactive map of Barquisimeto Metropolitan Cathedral; Catedral Metropolitana de Barquisimeto

Architecture
- Architect: Jan Bergkamp
- Style: Modern
- Completed: 1968

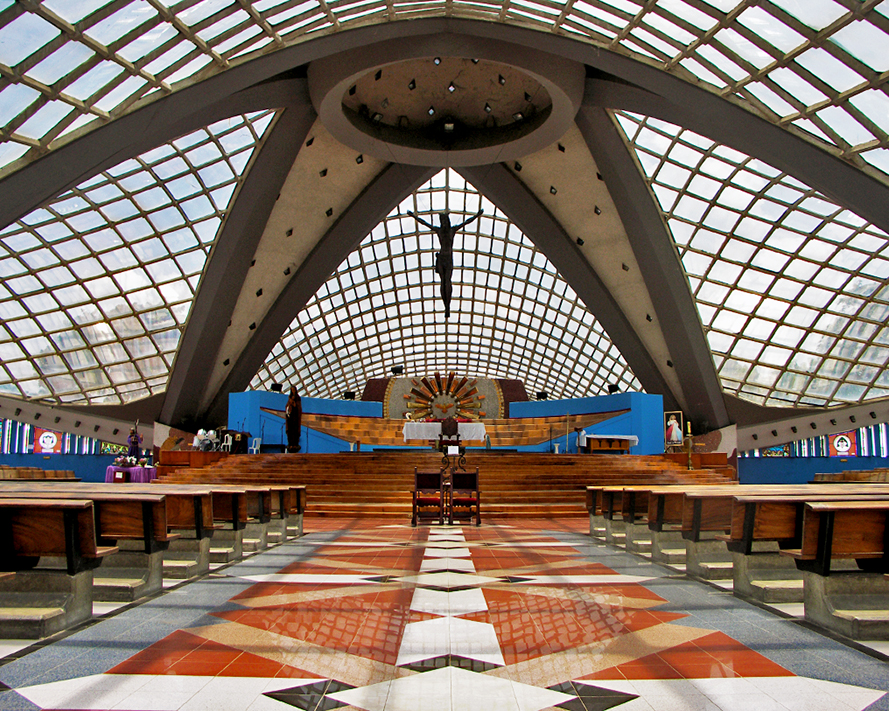
Interior

Barquisimeto Cathedral (Catedral Metropolitana de Barquisimeto) is a Roman Catholic cathedral in Barquisimeto, Venezuela. It is one of the most modern cathedrals in Latin America, considered original in style. Designed by Jan Bergkamp, it was his first major project. Its exterior shape is an upside down flower, with a bell tower external to the building. It is located on Avenida Venezuela between Avenida Simón Rodríguez and Calle 30. Considered to be advanced engineering for its time, it was completed in 1968. This unconventionally-shaped cathedral is a hyperbolic paraboloid with two wings connected by a central tower. It required extensive structural precision. The cathedral ceiling consists of acrylic panels supported by a network of steel wires.

== History ==
A Franciscan chapel was built in this location in 1636, when a permit was conferred by Governor Francisco Núñez Melián, enacted from his home in Puerto Rico. The 1812 earthquake reduced the building to rubble. In 1865, construction of a new building was completed. Venezuela's 1950 earthquake, which was felt in Barquisimeto, lead to significant destruction within the chapel. As a result, the building was demolished, leaving only the bell tower (1865) and clock (1888). The construction of the present church building began in 1953 to a design of the architect Jahn Bergkamp. It features four naves and is considered an expression of modern art. Every year on January 14, the Divina Pastora returns to the cathedral. It was vandalized in 2014.

== See also ==
- Catholic Church in Venezuela
- List of cathedrals in Venezuela
