= Church and Convent of Our Lady of Mount Carmel =

Church in Salvador, Bahia, Brazil

- Igreja e Convento de Nossa Senhora do Carmo
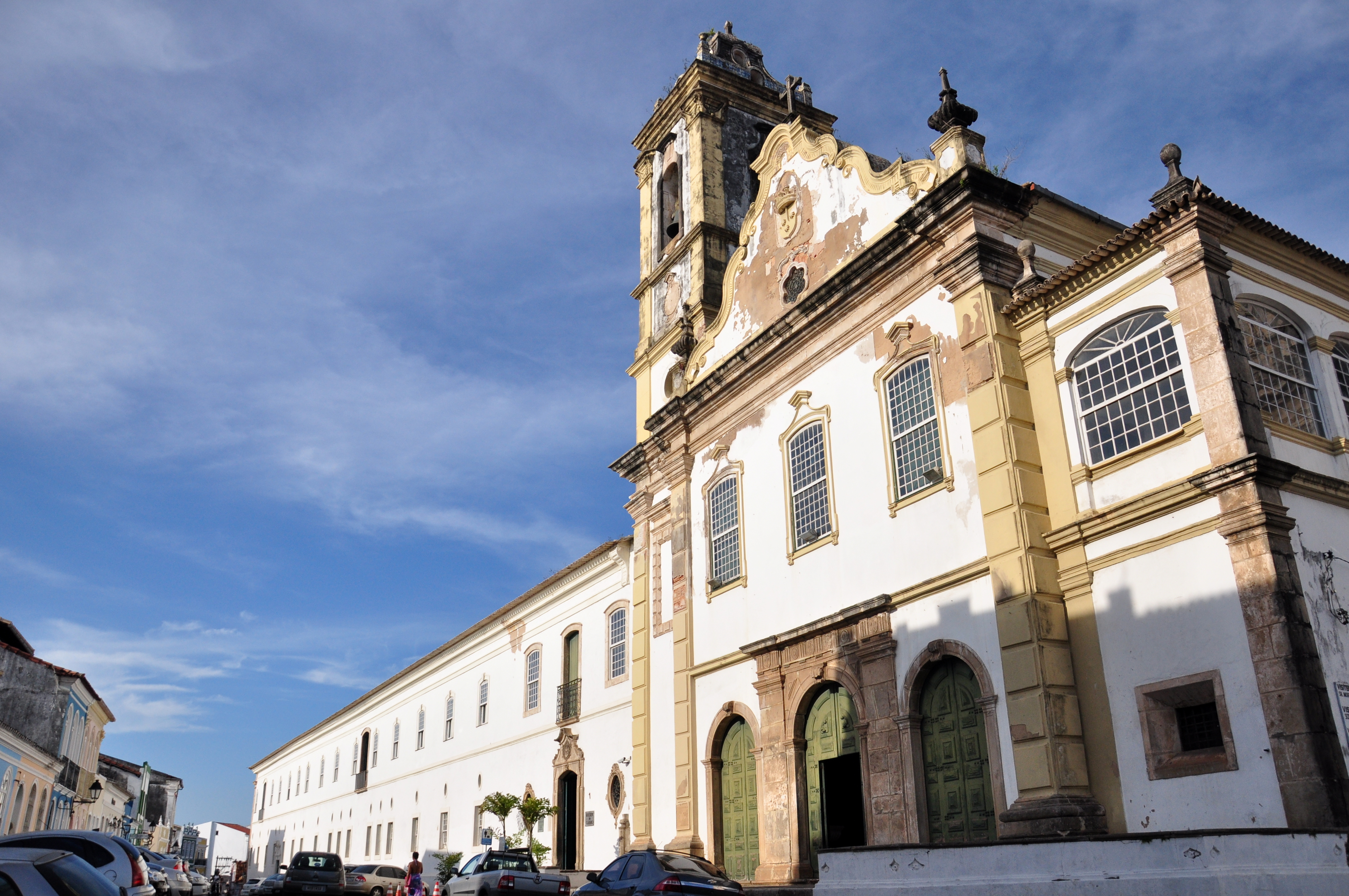
- Church and Convent of Our Lady of Mount Carmel, Salvador, Bahia, Brazil

- Location of the Church and Convent of Our Lady of Mount Carmel in Brazil Church and Convent of Our Lady of Mount Carmel (South America)

Religion
- Affiliation: Catholic
- Rite: Roman

Location
- Municipality: Salvador
- State: Bahia
- Country: Brazil
- Interactive map of Church and Convent of Our Lady of Mount Carmel
- Coordinates: 12.968559°S 38.50721°W

Architecture
- Established: 1711
- Direction of façade: West

National Historic Heritage of Brazil
- Designated: 1938
- Reference no.: 90

The Church and Convent of Our Lady of Mount Carmel (Portuguese: Igreja e Convento de Nossa Senhora do Carmo) is a 17th-century Roman Catholic church and former convent in Salvador, Bahia, Brazil. The church is dedicated to Our Lady of Mount Carmel. The complex is adjacent to the Church of the Third Order of Mount Carmel. The Church and Convent of Our Lady of Mount Carmel was listed as a historic structure by National Institute of Historic and Artistic Heritage (IPHAN) in 1938 and is part of the Historic Center of Salvador UNESCO World Heritage Site.

== History ==
Members of the Carmelite Order arrived in Bahia in the 1580s. They built a convent in 1586 on Mount Calvário, a small hill overlooking the Bay of All Saints north the small settlement of Salvador. It was built outside the protective walls of the small settlement. After the Dutch occupation of Brazil (1630–1654) the Portuguese used the church as a gunpowder storehouse and the church as a barracks. A new convent, the existing structure, dates to 1681.

== Location ==
The Church and Convent of Our Lady of Mount Carmel is located at the north of the Historic Centre of Salvador. It sits on Rua do Carmo, a cobblestone street, in the Santo Antônio Além do Carmo district. The church is adjacent to the Church of the Third Order of Mount Carmel.

== Structure ==
=== Church ===
The Church Our Lady of Mount Carmel has a single nave and layout typical of 17th-century church architecture in Bahia. The church has a single bell tower to the left of the façade and a three wide portals. Three windows at the choir level correspond to the portals below. The high altar of the church has a silver front that dates to the 18th century, but the church was largely redesigned and renovated in the neoclassical style in the early 19th century. Lioz limestone was imported from Portugal at great expense, and like other churches of the Historic Center of Salvador was utilized in the flooring, stoups, baptismal font, and other elements of the interior of the church. The Church Our Lady of Mount Carmel has a sacristy in the rococo style.

=== Convent ===
The Convent Our Lady of Mount Carmel occupies the majority of the complex. The convent has two cloisters; the smaller dates to the 17th century and the larger to the second half of the 18th century. The convent has two stories that overlook the cloister.

== Protected status ==
The Church and Convent of Our Lady of Mount Carmel, both the structure and its contents, was listed as a historic structure by the National Institute of Historic and Artistic Heritage in 1938 under inscription number 90.

== Access ==
The Church of Our Lady of Mount Carmel is open to the public and may be visited.
