= Divina Pastora =

Municipality in Sergipe, Brazil

Coordinates: 10°41′20″S 37°08′52″W

- Municipality
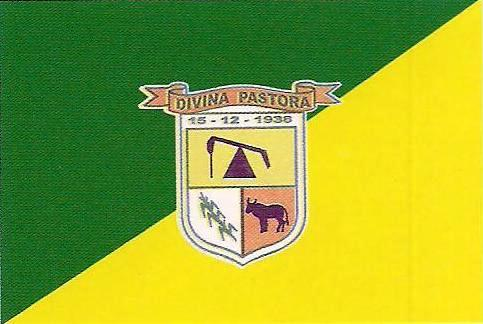
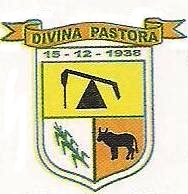
- Flag Coat of arms
- Interactive map of Divina Pastora
- Country: Brazil
- Time zone: UTC−3 (BRT)

Divina Pastora (Brazilian Portuguese pronunciation: [diˈvinɐ pɐʃˈtoɾɐ], alternatively diˈɦinɐ pɐʃˈtoɾɐ) is a municipality located in the Brazilian state of Sergipe. The Parish Church of Our Lady of the Divine Shepherd (Igreja Matriz de Nossa Senhora Divina Pastora), a listed historic structure by the National Institute of Historic and Artistic Heritage (IPHAN), was constructed in the late 18th century and is located at the east of the city center. Its population was 5,215 (2020) and its area is 92 square kilometres (36 mi^{2}).

== See also ==
- Divina Pastora (Barquisimeto)
- List of municipalities in Sergipe
