= Church of Nosso Senhor do Bonfim, Salvador =

Catholic church in Salvador, Bahia, Brazil

Church of Nosso Senhor do Bonfim
- Igreja de Nosso Senhor do Bonfim
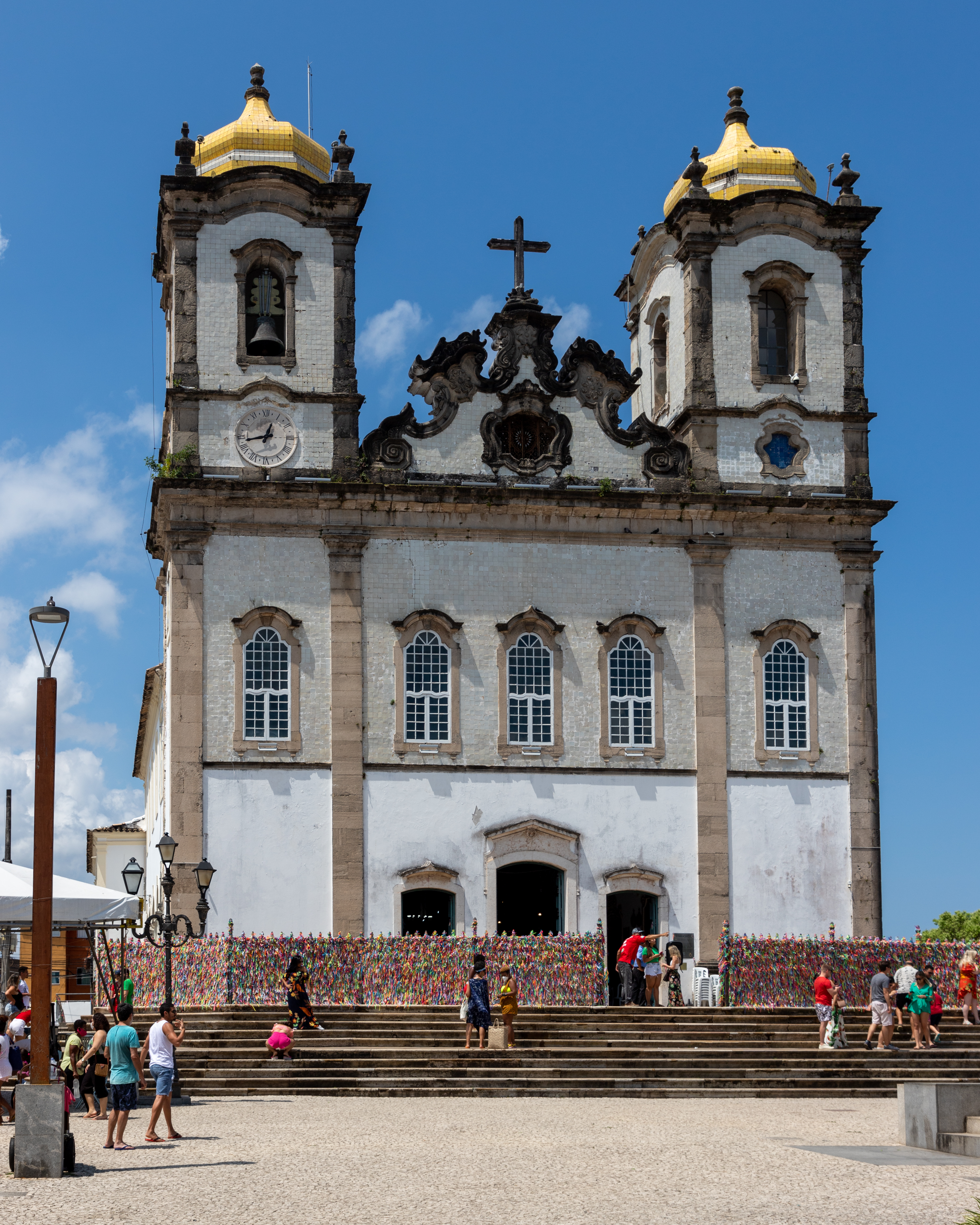
- Main façade of the Church of Nosso Senhor do Bonfim

- Location of the Church of Nosso Senhor do Bonfim in Brazil

Religion
- Affiliation: Roman Catholic
- Rite: Roman

Location
- Municipality: Salvador
- State: Bahia
- Country: Brazil
- Coordinates: 12.923743°S 38.508093°W

National Historic Heritage of Brazil
- Designated: 1938
- Reference no.: 122

The Church of Our Lord of Bonfim (Portuguese: Igreja de Nosso Senhor do Bonfim) is the most famous of the Catholic churches of Salvador, in the State of Bahia, Brazil. It was built in the 18th century on the only line of hills in the Itapagipe Peninsula, in the lower town of Salvador. The church is the subject of intense religious devotion by the people of Salvador and is the site of a famous celebration held every year in January, the Festa do Senhor do Bonfim. The church is the cathedral of the Roman Catholic Diocese of Bonfim. The church is noted for the Festa do Bonfim ("Feast of Bonfim"), held annually the second Thursday after Three Kings Day. The festival combines elements of both Catholicism and Candomblé. It was listed as a historic structure by the National Historic and Artistic Heritage Institute in 1938.

== History ==
The veneration of Nosso Senhor do Bonfim (Our Lord of the Good End, represented by the crucified Jesus in the moment of his death) is an old tradition in Portugal that was brought to Brazil during colonial times. In 1740, while pursuing a vow, Captain Teodósio Rodrigues de Faria of the Portuguese Navy brought a statue of Nosso Senhor do Bonfim from Setúbal, Portugal, to Salvador. Some years later a religious brotherhood (irmandade) dedicated to Our Lord of Bonfim was founded and a church to house the statue—the current Church of Nosso Senhor do Bonfim—began being built on top of Montserrat hill, in the Itapagipe Peninsula, in the lower town of Salvador. The church sits on the only line of hills on the Itapagipe Peninsula on an elevation now called the Colina Sagrada ("Holy Mount"). Construction on the church began in 1740 and it was inaugurated in 1754. The towers were finished around 1772.

In the 19th century, the Bonfim Brotherhood built houses in the square in front of the church to house the pilgrims (romeiros) that come to Salvador every year to honour Our Lord of Bonfim.

== Structure ==
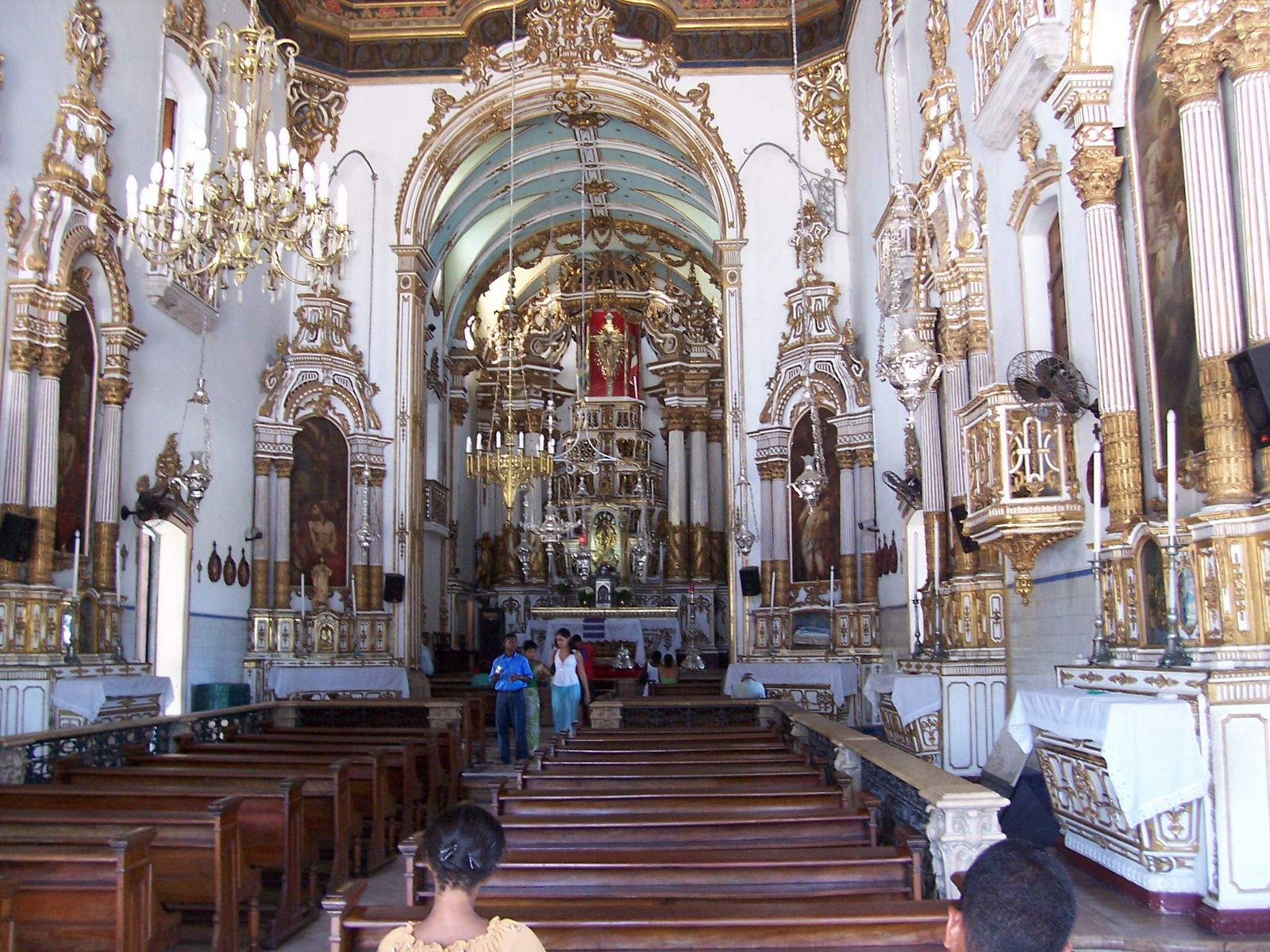
Interior of the Church of Nosso Senhor do Bonfim

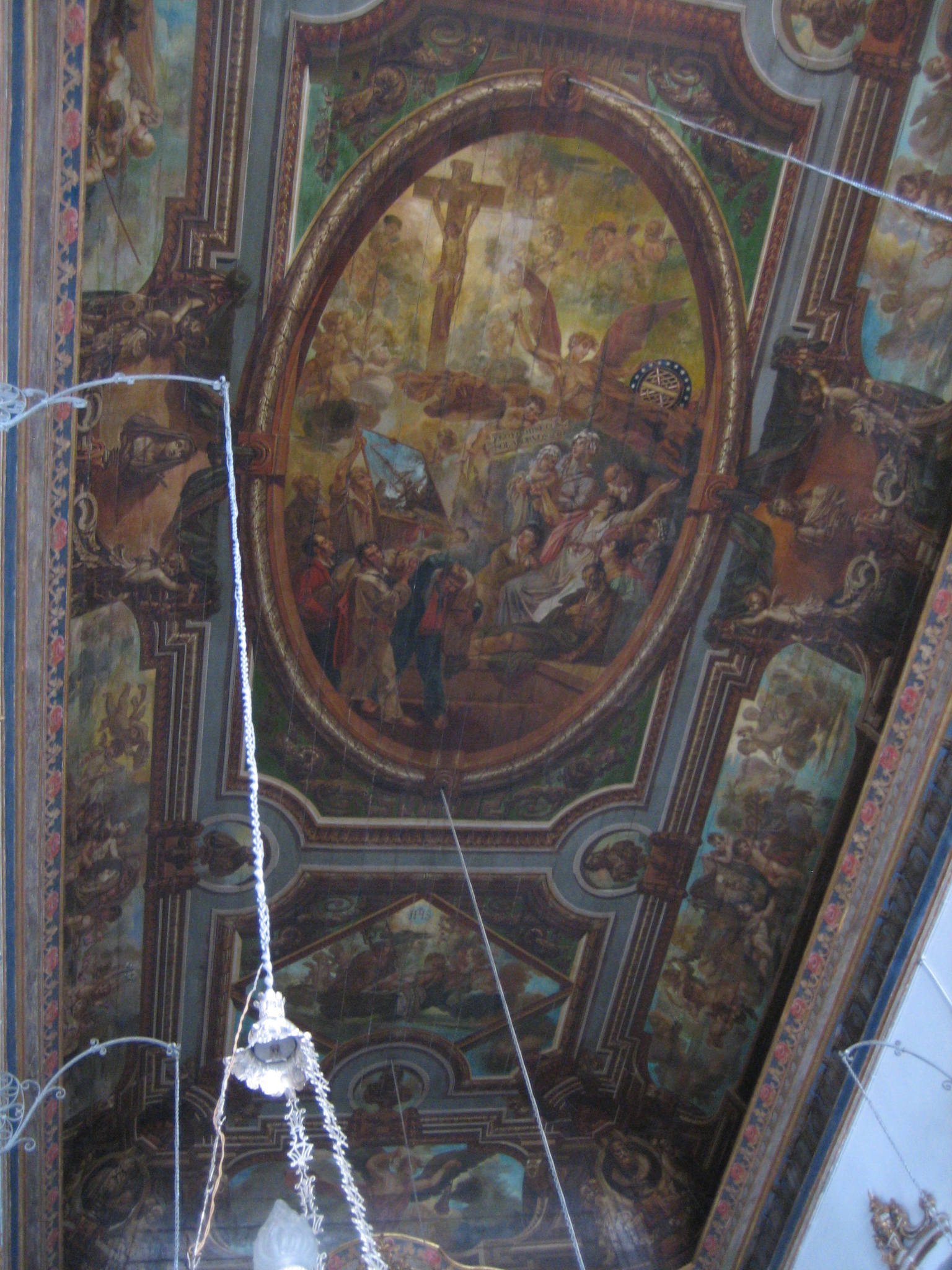
Wooden ceiling of the church painted 1818–1820 by Franco Velasco.

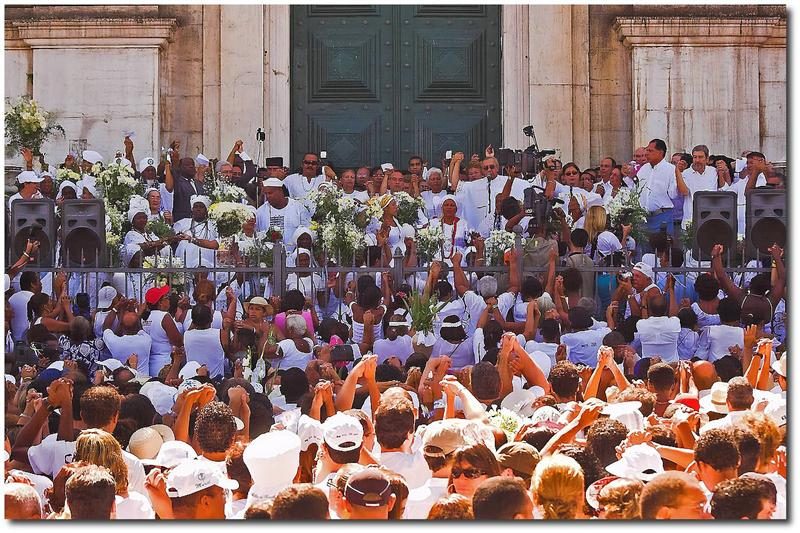
Multitude praying in front of the Church of Conceição da Praia during the Bonfim festivities.

The Church of Nosso Senhor do Bonfim is constructed of brick and stone masonry. The façade of the church is two-dimensional, with a central body flanked by two towers. The windows and elaborate volutes of the gable of the pediment of the façade are in the Rococo style. The lower parts of the façade were covered by industrial Portuguese azulejo tiles in 1873. They are white with a yellow tint and were designed to resemble those of the Church of Saint Francis in the Historic Center of Salvador. The church has two bell towers; they were crowned with bulbous roofs at the end of the 19th century.

=== Interior ===
The interior decoration of the church was finished in the 19th century, and consists of a rich archive of painting, azulejos, gilded woodcarvings, and furniture. The nave has a single aisle. The church has six side altars; two on each of the lateral walls and two at the front of the nave. The Neoclassical main altarpiece, which has the form of a baldachin with a cupola sustained by volutes, was carved by the master sculptor Antônio Joaquim dos Santos between 1813 and 1814; he is likely also responsible for its design. The side altars have paintings by José Teófilo de Jesus (ca. 1758–1847) at center in place of the gilded wooden images of saints found in other churches of Bahia. The interior of the church has a great number of azulejos. There are 28 large-scale azulejo panels on the lateral walls of the church depicting the life of Christ. They were painted by Tomáz do Carmo in Lisbon in 1855. Similar panels of azulejos were ordered from Portugal in the same decade to decorate the sacristy, but were never installed. The nave and sacristy have plain azulejos. Between 1816 and 1817 Antônio de Santa Rosa carved the ceiling of the chancel, its tribunes, the chancel arch, and two side altars.

Another notable feature of the church is the wooden ceiling painted by Bahia artist Franco Velasco between 1818 and 1820, showing people thanking Our Lord of Bonfim for having survived a shipwreck. The sacristy, nave and other rooms of the church display paintings by another notable Bahia painter, José Teófilo de Jesus and were done in the 1830s.

=== Noted artwork ===
- Nave ceiling, Franco Velasco
- Cristo com a Adúltera (Christ with the Adultereress), José Theófilo de Jesus, sacristy
- A Morte do Pecador (Death of the Sinner), attributed to Bento Capinam
- A Morte do Justo (Death of the Just), attributed to Tito Nicolau Capinam

== Festa do Bonfim ==
The Festa do Bonfim (Portuguese: [ˈfɛstɐ du bõˈfĩ], "Feast of Bonfim") is annual religious celebration in Salvador, starting on the second Thursday after Three Kings Day (January 6). The festival dates to the 18th century, when Captain Theodózio Rodrigues de Fria survived a storm at sea en route to Lisbon; he returned to Brazil with an image of the Senhor do Bonfim to the church, and celebrated its festival date within the chancel and nave of the church. The festival became a city-wide celebration by the 19th century, as noted in newspapers of the period. On the Thursday after Three Kings Day, the faithful gather in front of the Church of Conceição da Praia, in the Cidade Baixa of Salvador, in present-day Comércio. It is led by a group of bahianas, or women in traditional white costume, with turbans and long, round skirts. After mass, the faithful take part on a procession that leaves the Church of Conceição da Praia, cross 8 kilometres (5.0 mi) to the hill of the Bonfim Church. Upon reaching the top, the bahianas, who are associated with Candomblé, wash the steps and the square (adro) in front of the church with aromatised water while dancing and singing chants in the Yoruba language. The washing ritual is called the Lavagem do Bonfim (Washing of Bonfim) and attracts both Catholic and adherents of Candomblé, as well as tourists.

The celebrations last ten days and end with a large-scale mass in the Bonfim Church. Many worshippers come from far away to honour vows taken to Our Lord of Bonfim. The church has a museum of ex-votos brought by the worshipers in gratitude after receiving a divine grace. The feast includes stands serving traditional food, souvenirs, traditional dances and concerts by local musical groups.

Even though the feast is Catholic in its origins, it also reveals much about the religious syncretism between Catholicism and African religions in Bahia. In the Candomblé religion, Our Lord of Bonfim is associated with Oxalá, father of the Orishas and creator of humankind. The Catholic Church banned the washing of the steps of the church at various times in the 20th century by Archbishop Augusto Álvaro da Silva: first between 1929 and 1936, in 1943, and from 1948 to 1952.

== Senhor do Bonfim bracelets ==
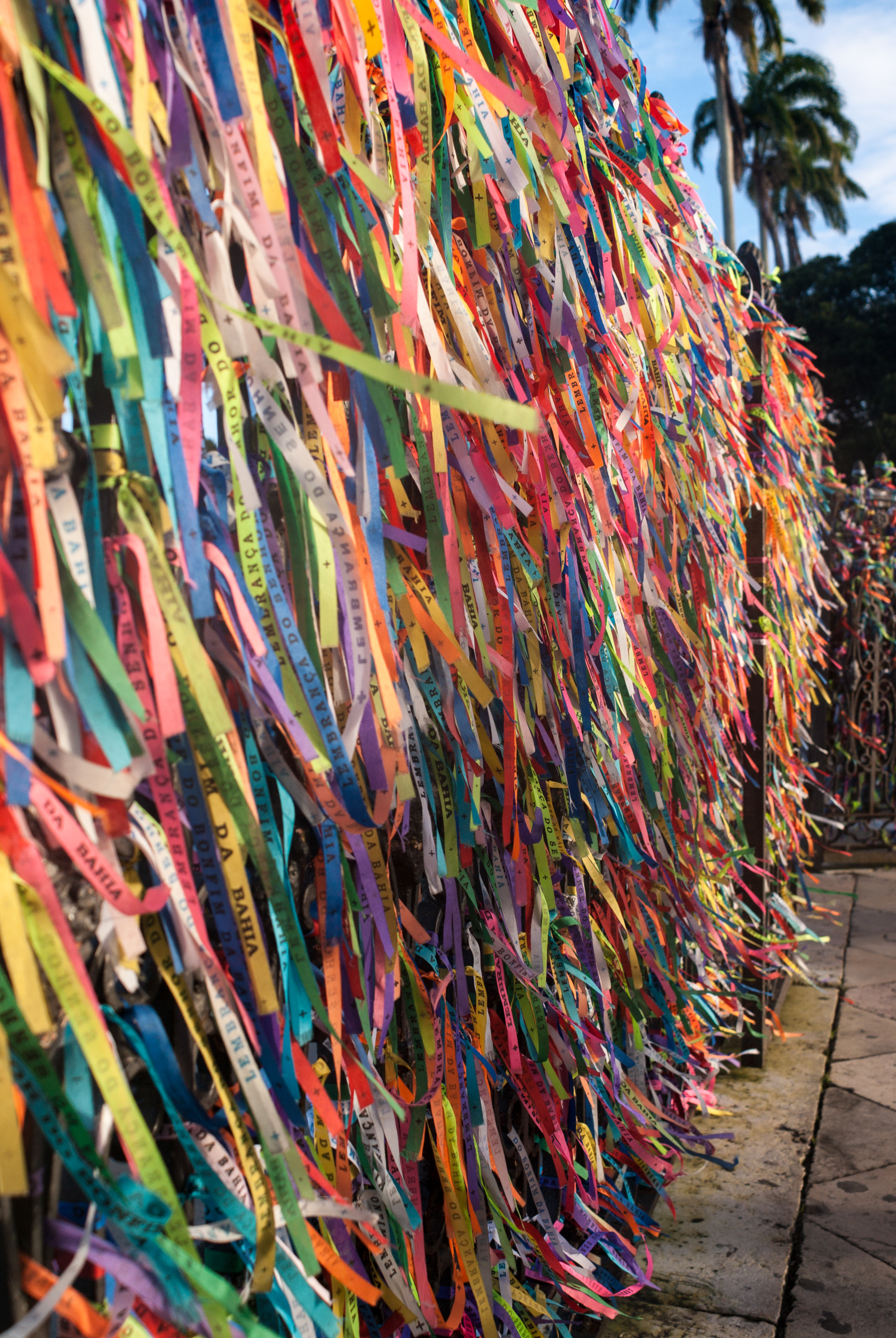
Fitas at the Cathedral of Bonfim

Fitinha do Senhor do Bonfim (English: Lord of Bonfim Ribbon) is a souvenir and popular amulet that can be found being sold by street vendors around the Church. The fashion accessory is made from cotton and has the phrase "Lembrança do Senhor do Bonfim da Bahia" (Remembrance of the Lord of Bonfim of Bahia). The term has religious connotations and refers to a representation of Jesus. The Fita do Senhor do Bonfim was worn by a supermodel in Milano, resulting in a cover page in Elle.

== Protected status ==
The Church of Nosso Senhor do Bonfim was listed as a historic structure by the National Institute of Historic and Artistic Heritage in 1938. The structure was registered under the Book of Historical Works, Inscription 131 and Book of Fine Arts, Inscription 23. The directive is dated June 17, 1938.

== Access ==
The church is open to the public and may be visited.
