= Forte de Santo Antônio Além do Carmo =

Fort, former prison, and cultural center in Salvador, Brazil

Forte de Santo António Além‐do‐Carmo
- Salvador, Bahia in Brazil
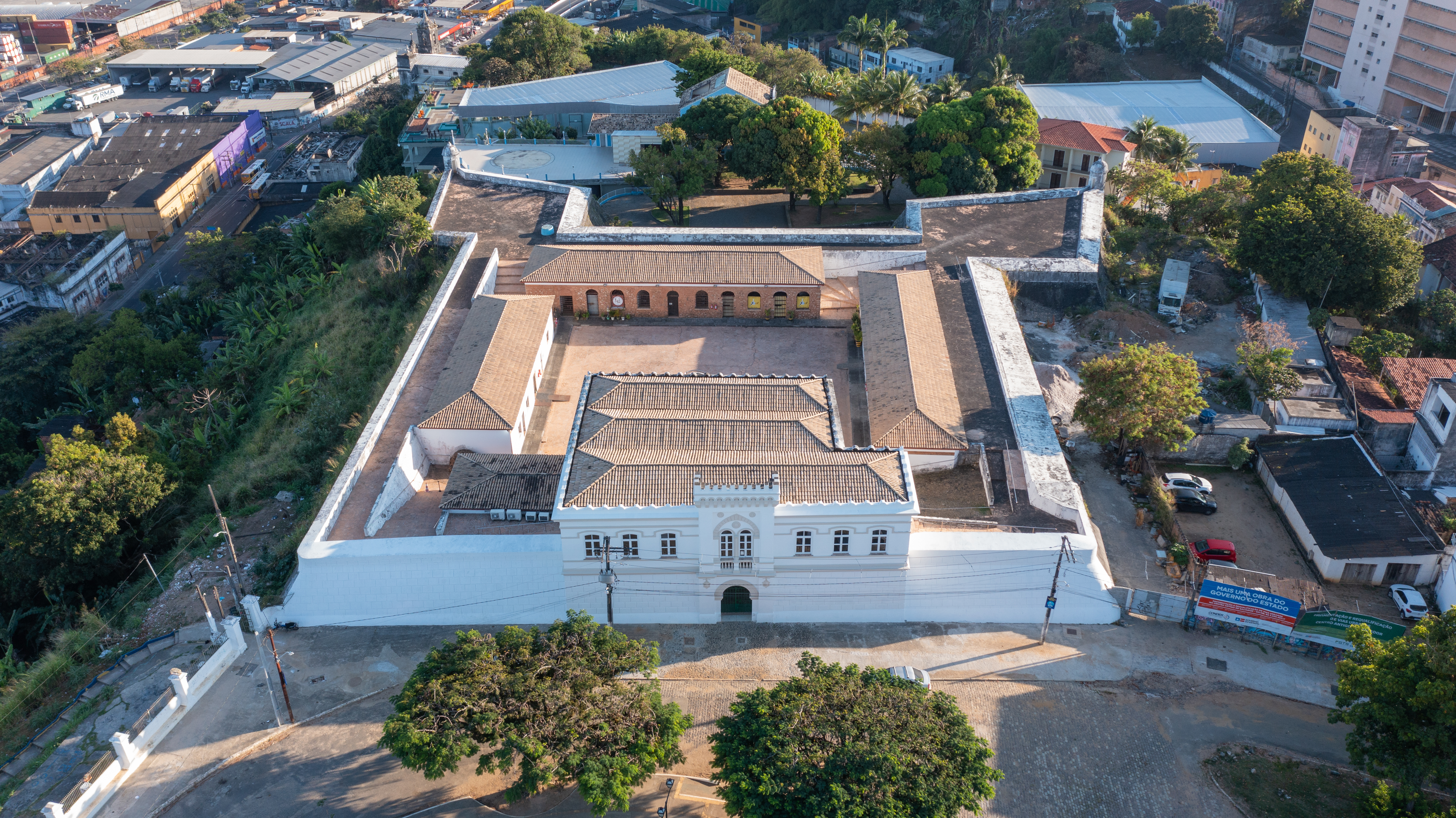
- Entrance of Forte de Santo António Além‐do‐Carmo

Site information
- Type: Fort

Location
- Location of Forte de Santo Antônio in Brazil
- Coordinates: 12.962644°S 38.503276°W

Forte de Santo Antônio Além do Carmo is a fort located in Salvador, Bahia, Brazil. It is variously known as the Forte da Capoeira, State Prison. The fort defended the northern limit of Salvador at its time of construction 17th century.

== Early history ==
The fort was built at the site of a trench excavated by the Dutch during the Dutch invasion of Brazil, specifically an invasion into Bahia between 1624 and 1625. The first fort of Forte de Santo Antônio Além do Carmo was constructed by Diogo Luís de Oliveira, the Count of Miranda and governor of the Captaincy of Bahia from 1627 to 1635. A full structure of stone and mortar was constructed from the late 17th to the early 18th century.

== Prison ==
The Secretaria do Estado dos Negócios da Justiça (State Department of Justice) transformed the fort into a prison in 1830. It notably housed Afro-Brazilians captured at the end of the Malê revolt of 1835. The fort was renovated into the State Penitentiary of Bahia by the mid-20th century. It housed numerous political prisoners during the Brazilian dictatorship beginning in 1964; the military regime deactivated the prison in 1976. The inmates of the prison were transferred to the Regional Prison of Salvador (Presidio de Salvador) in the Mata Escura neighborhood of the city. The City of Salvador requested transfer of ownership of the structure from the Secretariat of Justice in 1978.

== Forte da Capoeira ==
After a period of decline after the transfer of the fort to the City of Salvador the Ministry of Culture of Bahia began and elaborate restoration of the building into a multi-purpose cultural center. Etelvina Rebouças served as the architect beginning in 1990; the renovation was completed in 2006. As the facility had been used by a capoeira school since 1981, the renovated fort was renamed the Forte da Capoeira. It houses two schools of capoeira, one on the lower level, and one of the upper level. The facility also houses a small library and archive related to capoeira.

== See also ==
- Military history of Brazil
