= Manuel Míguez González =

Spanish priest

Saint Manuel Míguez González S.P.
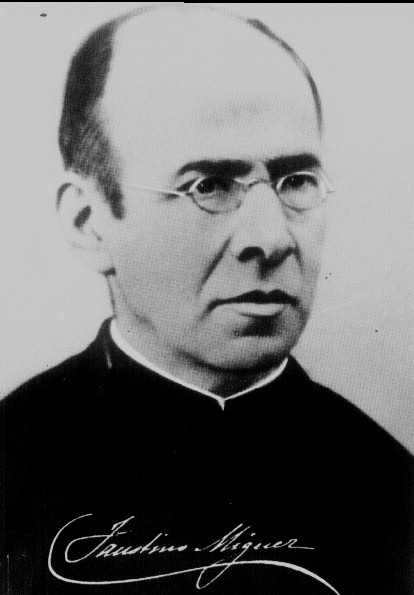
- Signed photograph c. 1890.

Priest
- Born: 24 March 1831; Xamirás, Ourense, Kingdom of Spain
- Died: 8 March 1925 (aged 93); Getafe, Madrid, Kingdom of Spain
- Venerated in: Roman Catholic Church
- Beatified: 25 October 1998, Saint Peter's Square, Vatican City by Pope John Paul II
- Canonized: 15 October 2017, Saint Peter's Square, Vatican City by Pope Francis
- Feast: 8 March
- Attributes: Priest's attire
- Patronage: Daughters of the Divine Shepherdess; Pharmacists; Scientists; Educators

Manuel Míguez González (24 March 1831 – 8 March 1925) – in religion Faustino of the Incarnation – was a Spanish priest and a professed member of the Piarists, as well as the founder of the Daughters of the Divine Shepherdess – better known as the Calasanzian Institute. He gained a rather strong reputation for being a formidable pastor and a man dedicated to both education and science while using his scientific knowledge to concoct natural medicines to aid the ill who came to him for his help. But his religious activism augmented when he saw illiterate women and those who were marginalized and so decided to establish a religious congregation to educate women.

The beatification was held in Saint Peter's Square on 25 October 1998 under Pope John Paul II. Pope Francis confirmed his canonization on 21 December 2016; an official date was set at a gathering of the College of Cardinals on 20 April and he was canonized as a saint on 15 October 2017.

== Life ==
Manuel Míguez González was born in Ourense Province on 24 March 1831 as the fourth and final child to Benito Míguez and María González. Before him was the eldest child Carmiña and then Antonio and José. The infant was later baptized in the parish church of San Jorge de Acebedo in the town next to his on 25 March. He made his First Communion in 1841.

In his childhood he loved trees and spent a lot of time observing them. He studied Latin and the humanities in Ourense where he first discovered and discerned his vocation to become a priest; this intensified upon knowing his elder brother Antonio was on the road to the priesthood through ecclesial studies and José was planning to become one. But his father did not like the idea for he proposed that José take care of the farm while allowing Antonio and Manuel to go. He entered the novitiate of the Piarists in 1850 in Madrid at Saint Ferdinand's and he assumed the habit for the first time on 5 December 1850 while assuming the religious name of "Faustino of the Incarnation"; he was ordained to the diaconate in 1855. González made his solemn vows on 16 January 1853. He received the minor orders and tonsure on 23 December 1854 and became a subdeacon on 24 December 1854. He studied natural sciences at some stage during his education. González received his ordination to the priesthood from the Bishop of Osma-Soria Vicente Horcos San Martín in the parish church of San Marcos de Madrid on 8 March 1856. He celebrated his first Mass on the feast of Saint Joseph on 19 March 1856.

The new priest was sent on a range of missions to schools in places such as San Fernando and Celanova but was also assigned to other localities such Monforte de Lemos. But the priest was sent to Guanabacoa in Cuba in 1857 and he later returned on 3 March 1860 due to illness; he arrived in Cuba on 3 November 1857. But his time in schools did not see him neglect his other duties as a priest for he loved to spend hours on end hearing confessions and became known in due course for his remarkable patience and sage advice.

His abilities in science allowed him to investigate the healing properties of various plants which he deemed were remedies from God for the cure of various ailments and he often prepared medicines and cured those ill people who came to him for his assistance. He was later sent at some stage to Sanlucar de Barrameda where he encountered marginalized and illiterate women and he decided to aid them from this appalling injustice. He established the Daughters of the Divine Shepherdess on 2 January 1885 for girls – also known as the Calasanzian Institute – and placed emphasis on their education for the promotion of women in life. His order received diocesan approval from the Archbishop of Seville on 12 June 1889 and later received the papal decree of praise from Pope Pius X on 6 December 1910 before receiving his full approval in 1912. From 30 September 1888 until his death he resided in Getafe.

The priest died on 8 March 1925. In 2006 his order has 268 religious in a total of 43 communities in nations such as Ecuador and India amongst other places.

== Sainthood ==
The cause of beatification commenced in Madrid in an informative process that spanned from 31 January 1953 until an unspecified point but an apostolic process was later held in order to collect further evidence. The formal introduction to the cause came on 7 January 1982 after the Congregation for the Causes of Saints granted the official "nihil obstat" and titled him as a Servant of God. The C.C.S. validated the two previous processes on 28 February 1984 and later received the official Positio dossier from the postulation for assessment. Theologians approved the cause on 26 June 1990 as did the C.C.S. on 20 October 1992. Pope John Paul II recognized that he had lived a life of heroic virtue and proclaimed him to be Venerable on 21 December 1992.

The single miracle needed for beatification was investigated in the diocese of its origin and received C.C.S. validation in Rome on 2 December 1994. The board of medical experts advising the C.C.S. approved this miracle on 9 November 1995 as did the theological consultants on 12 June 1997 and the C.C.S. themselves on 17 March 1998. John Paul II approved this healing to be a legitimate miracle on 6 April 1998 and beatified the late Piarist priest in Saint Peter's Square on 25 October 1998.

The second miracle – the one for full sainthood – was investigated in its diocese of origin and later received official C.C.S. validation on 31 May 2010. Pope Francis approved this miracle on 21 December 2016 and thus confirmed his canonization for 2017; a formal date was set at a gathering of the College of Cardinals on 20 April and he was canonized as a saint on 15 October 2017.

The postulator for this cause at the time of canonization was Mateusz Pindelski.
