= José Teófilo de Jesus =

Brazilian painter

- Born: Salvador, Bahia, Brazil; 1758
- Died: July 19, 1847; Salvador, Bahia, Brazil
- Known for: painter, gilder
- Style: Baroque, Rococo

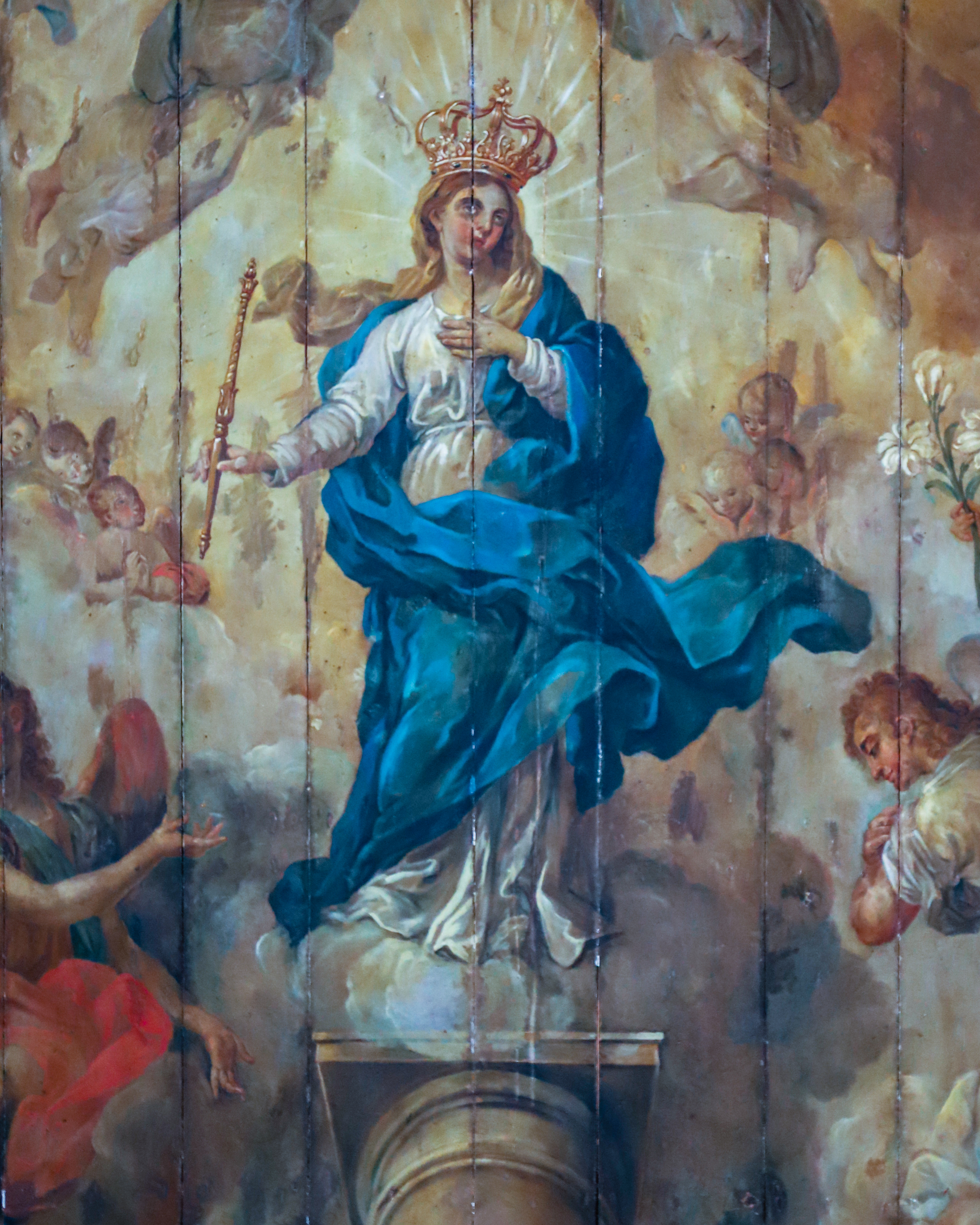
Nossa Senhora do Pilar, ceiling painting of the Parish Church of Our Lady of Pilar, Salvador, Bahia

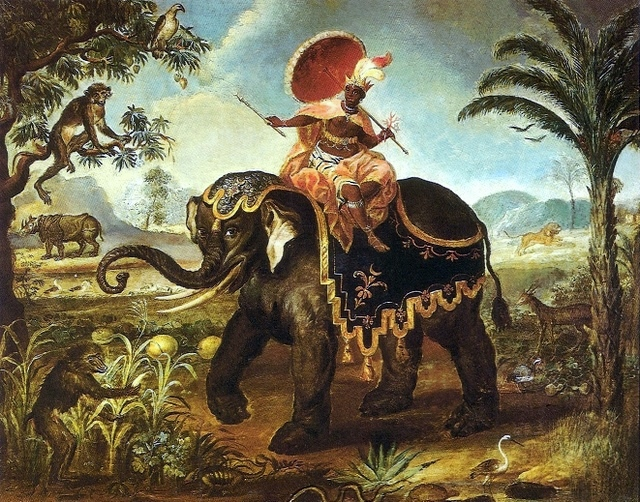
África, Bahia Museum of Art, Salvador, Bahia

José Teófilo de Jesus (Salvador, Bahia, 1758?-Salvador, Bahia, July 19, 1847) was a Brazilian painter and gilder. He is the most noted representative of the Escola Baiana or Bahian School of painting. His work was eclectic, characterized by the passage from the Baroque to the Rococo, with reference to Neoclassical traits. De Jesus was of pardo, or mixed ethnic ancestry and lived into his nineties; little else is known of his life. His production was apparently vast, but many of his works are only identified by oral tradition. Although he is known as one of the great names of the Brazilian Baroque, and one of its final artists, details of his life and a full account of his works remain unclear.

== Education and training ==
De Jesus was a freeman and pardo, or Brazilian of mixed ethnic ancestry. He became an apprentice of José Joaquim da Rocha (1737 - 1807) in the mid-18th century. He assisted Da Rocha in painting and filling of secondary figures on ceiling and panels. De Jesus was part of a generation of painters who traveled to Portugal and Italy for training. He arrived in Lisbon in 1794 with Da Rocha's assistance, and worked with the foremost painters of the day, such as Vieira Lusitano, and Pompeo Batoni, an Italian working at the Basílica da Estrela in Lisbon. While there, De Jesus was instructed by the painter Pedro Alexandrino de Carvalho (1729 - 1810) The story of De Jesus's travel and study in Portugal was held as legend until the late 20th century; the archaeologist and historian Carlos Ott (1908–1997) discovered correspondence dating to 1794 confirming De Jesus's work in Europe.

De Jesus received his first commissions upon his return to Brazil in 1801. He completed four panels in the Church of the Third Order of Saint Francis in 1802 for the cost of 80$000. These works are now lost. He completed a painting of Our Lord of the Good End (Nosso Senhor do Bonfim) in 1803 for the Santa Casa and Our Lady of Mercy Church; this painting has also disappeared. His name disappears from the record for about ten years after these works, a period in which he likely worked in private homes and chapels. De Jesus inherited many of the clients of Da Rocha upon his death in 1807, and began his great works starting in 1815 at the Church of the Third Order of Mount Carmel He received 3:400$000 for his painting and gilding work at the church.

== Works ==
José Teófilo de Jesus large-scale works include the ceilings of the naves of churches in Salvador, the Recôncavo region of the interior of the state of Bahia, and in the state of Sergipe. His works in Salvador include the ceilings of the naves of the Church of the Third Order of Saint Francis, Church of Our Lady of Barroquinha, and the church of Casa Pia and College of the Orphans of Saint Joachim in Salvador. De Jesus completed two major work in the Church of Nosso Senhor do Bonfim: Cristo e a Adúltera, completed approximately 183); and 34 small paintings along the corridor of the same church. They were completed between 1838 and 1839.

De Jesus also painted the ceiling of the nave of the Parish Church of the Blessed Sacrament (Matriz do Santíssimo Sacramento) on Itaparica Island, a short distance from Salvador. His works in the Recôncavo include the ceiling of the nave of the Church of the Third Order of Saint Francis in Cachoeira. His works in Sergipe include the ceiling and nave of Parish Church of Our Lady of the Divine Shepherd in the municipality of Divina Pastora. Numerous secular works of De Jesus, which probably date to the early 19th century, are preserved in Bahia Art Museum in Salvador.

== Marriage and death ==
The extent of the private life of De Jesus is summarized in his marriage record at the Parish of Santana:

"José Teófilo de Jesus, pardo [Brown], legitimate son of Antonio Feliciano Borges and Josefa de Santana, born in the city of Salvador, where he married Vicência Rosa de Jesus of Costa da Mina, preta forra [a formerly enslaved Black woman], of Gulf of Guinea region (Costa da Mina), on February 20, 1808; the place of marriage was at the Church of Santana, the age of the painter was not declared. This was testified by José Joaquim Viana e Manoel Inácio."

He died in Salvador on July 19, 1847, after falling from scaffolding while painting in the Parish Church of Our Lady of the Divine Shepherd.
