= Divina Pastora (Barquisimeto) =

Venezuelan religious statue

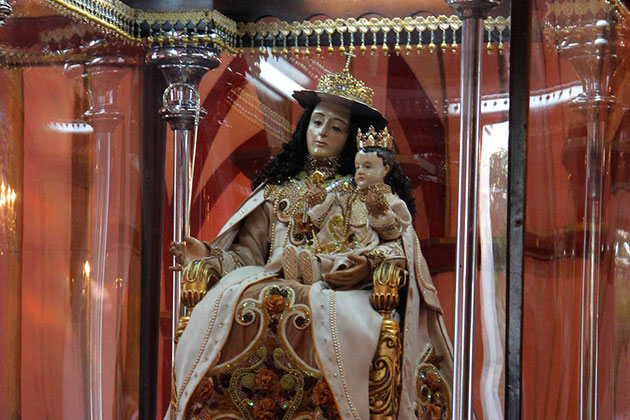
Divina Pastora (2014)

Divina Pastora (English title: Divine Shepherdess) is a statue of the Madonna and Child, the Virgin Mary holding the infant Jesus, with a lamb at her side. It is considered to be one of the most important religious icons of Venezuela. Divina Pastora is the patroness saint of the city of Barquisimeto and of the Venezuelan National Militia. The image dates from 1735. Divina Pastora is celebrated in a procession on January 14 of each year, when a massive Marian procession occurs, considered to be one of the largest in the world, attracting millions of pilgrims.

The statue is removed from its shrine and is carried on the main streets of Barquisimeto in a procession which starts at the Iglesia de la Divina Pastora in Santa Rosa until it reaches the Cathedral of Our Lady of Mount Carmel. This procession is unlike those mass Marian celebrations in the world where the image does not leave its temple. This procession occurs due to the devotion the people of Barquisimeto have towards it as gratitude towards saving the city from a cholera outbreak that occurred in the city in the 19th century. In 2016, 4,000,000 faithful honored the Divina Pastora.

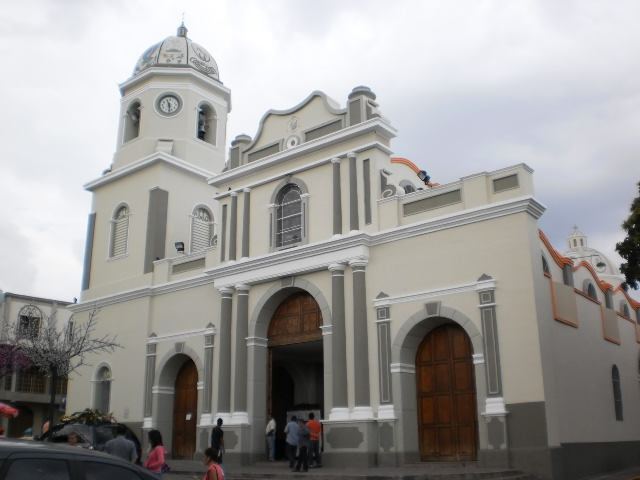
Iglesia de la Divina Pastora in Santa Rosa

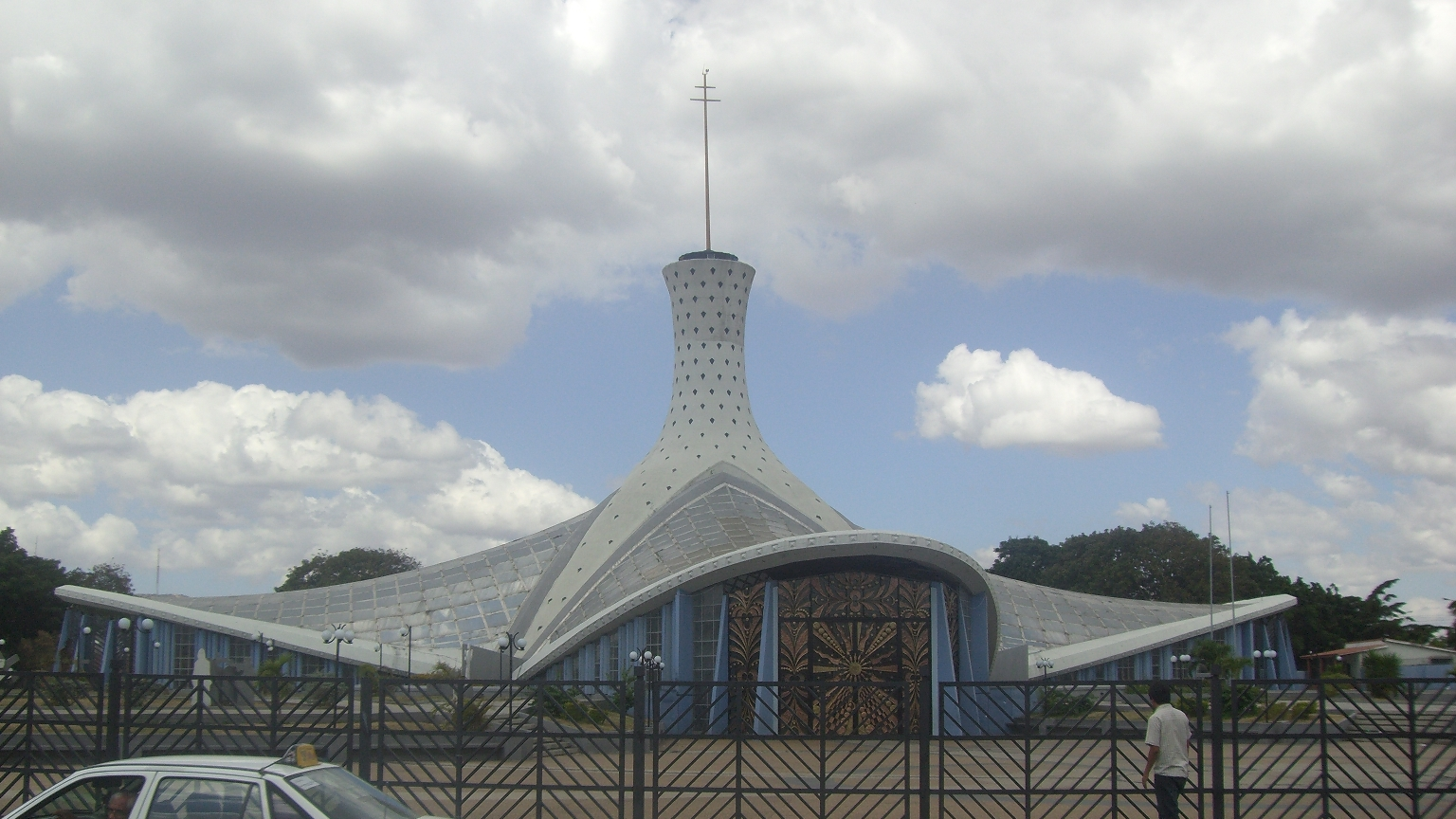
Barquisimeto Cathedral

== Background ==
The tradition comes from Seville, Spain. A Capuchin friar, Isidore of Seville, had a dream in which he saw an image of the Divina Pastora. Days later, he gave a detailed description of his vision to the artist Alonso Miguel de Tovar so that he could paint it. The painting of the virgin with pastoral hat, covered by a blue mantle, holding a boy in her left hand and a lamb in her right one, was called "Divina Pastora de Almas". Later, the sculptor Francisco Antonio Ruiz Gijón, made a life-sized sculpture of the Divina Pastora, which was carried in its first procession in 1705.

== History ==
The devotion to the Divina Pastora in Venezuela dates from 1736, when the parish priest of the town of Santa Rosa commissioned a sculptor to make a statue of the Immaculate Conception. Unexpectedly, the figure that was delivered was of the Divina Pastora. The priest wanted to return it, but the packing crate could not be lifted. The whole town took this as a sign that the statue was to remain in Santa Rosa. In 1855, the status of the Divina Pastora as the patroness saint of the Venezuelan state of Lara was further established, when a cholera epidemic occurred, striking a great number of families in Barquisimeto. Desperate, they implored the Divina Pastora for help. It is said that Father Jose Macario Yépez, parish priest of the La Concepción church of Barquisimeto, offered himself before the Virgin, to be the last victim of the disease. Some accounts say that the priest died six months later and that the epidemic then left the city; others indicate that his supplications stopped the epidemic immediately. The January 14th procession commemorates this event. In 2011, a group of vandals destroyed part of the Divina Pastora monument. The heads of sheep were decapitated and the face of the Virgin was hit by a bullet. Other images in the town were also vandalized with paint or destroyed.

== Procession ==
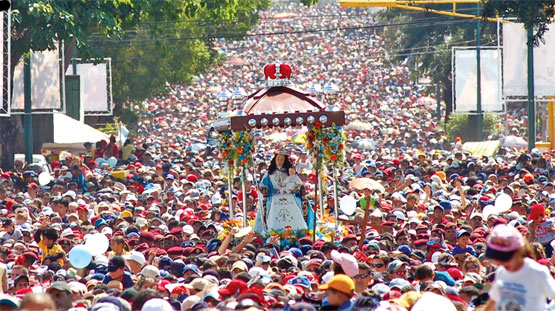
Procession

Each January 14 in Lara state, the Divine Shepherdess statue is carried by 6 to 10 men and women accompanied by a procession of more than 2 million people, some barefoot and carrying crosses, from Iglesia de la Divina Pastora in Santa Rosa near Barquisimeto to the Metropolitan Cathedral of Barquisimeto. It is a festive occasion, with countless street vendors selling anything from food and liquor to small religious figurines along the route of just over 7.5 km that snakes through the city. Beginning at about 11:30 after the 10:00 am Mass at Santa Rosa, the procession lasts nearly 7 hours, making a traditional stop at Macario Yepez square. It culminates in the arrival Mass celebrated far and wide on Avenida Venezuela, with various cultural and musical acts ending a day full of fervor and faith. During the next couple of months the "Shepherdess" visits some of the 52 parishes of Barquisimeto and arrives back in Santa Rosa in time for Palm Sunday.

== Veneration ==
The earthquake of March 26, 1812, (which devastated the cities of Caracas, Barquisimeto, Mérida, El Tocuyo and San Felipe) destroyed the temple of the Divina Pastora, but the sculpture remained intact, reinforcing the belief of the faithful that the Virgin wanted to stay to protect them.

The faith of devotees was also strengthened in 1855 after the breakout in Venezuela of a terrible cholera epidemic that decimated many families from Barquisimeto. The disease lingered, in spite of medicine, laments and prayers, and the desperate people decided as a last resort to walk in procession through the streets of Barquisimeto to the Divina Pastora, to implore her intercession, which was supposedly granted, as the epidemic ceased thereafter.

== Gallery ==
Every year the Virgin is dressed differently by a local fashion designer and her gown is donated by devotees paying penance.

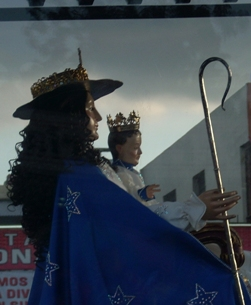
Divina Pastora (2009)

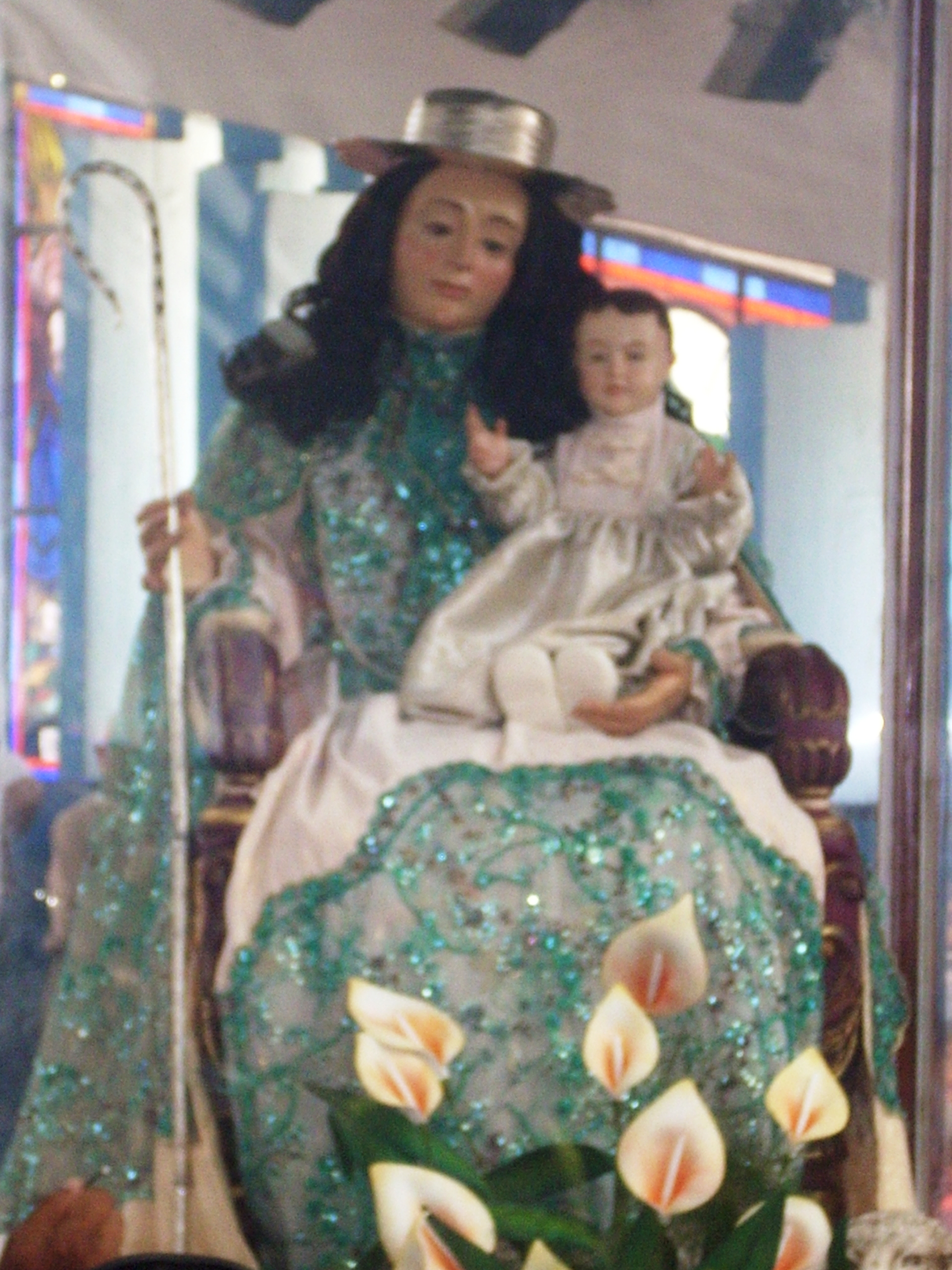
Divina Pastora (2010)

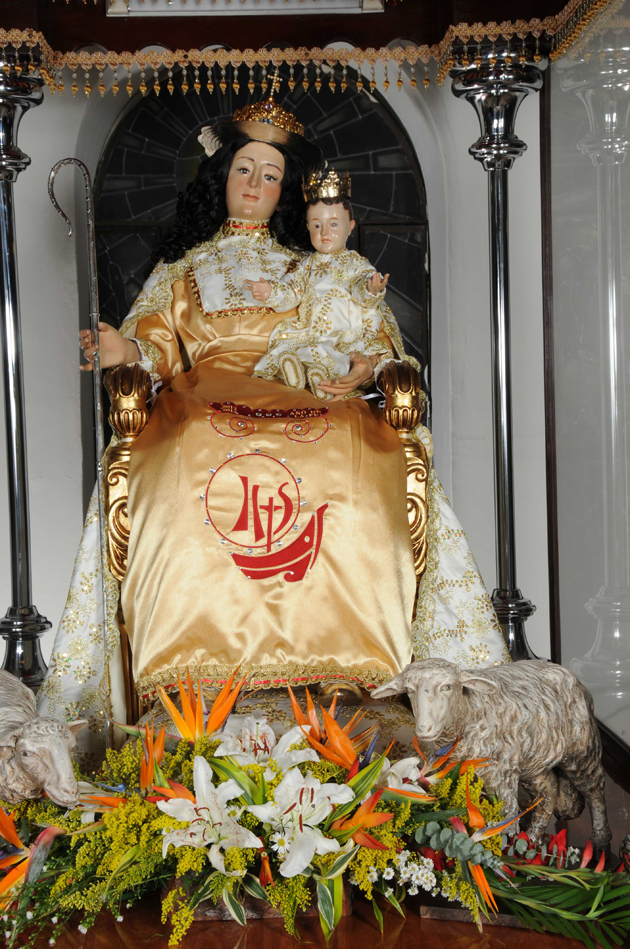
Divina Pastora (2013)
