= Reichsbank =

Former German central bank

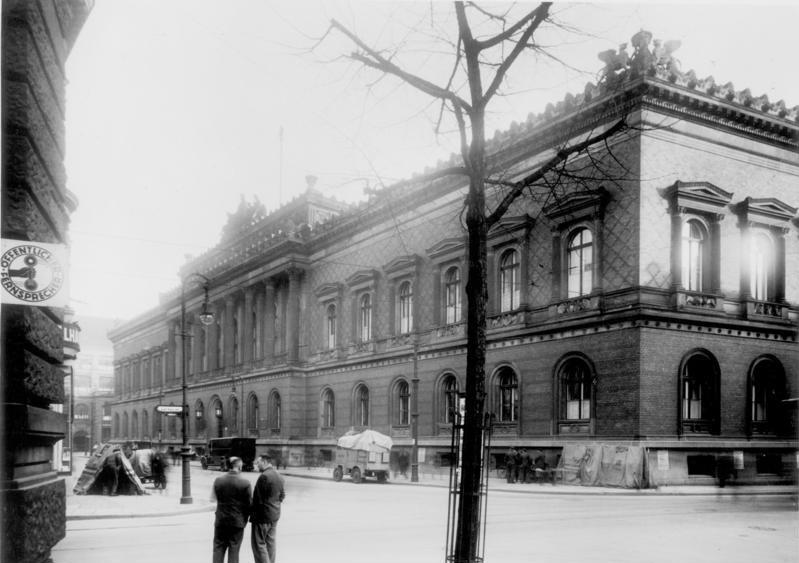
- Reichsbank head office at Jägerstraße in Berlin, photographed in 1933
- Central bank of: German Empire; Weimar Republic; Nazi Germany; Nazi-occupied territories
- Headquarters: Berlin
- Established: 1 January 1876
- Ownership: dispersed
- President: Hermann von Dechend (1876-1890); Richard Koch (1890-1908); Rudolf Havenstein (1908-1923); Hjalmar Schacht (1923-1930, 1933-1939); Hans Luther (1930-1933); Walther Funk (1939-1945)
- Currency: German mark (1876-1924); Reichsmark (1924-1945)
- Preceded by: Bank of Prussia (1876); Hamburg Bank; Oesterreichische Nationalbank (1938)
- Succeeded by: Bank deutscher Länder (West Germany); Deutsche Notenbank (GDR); Oesterreichische Nationalbank (Austria); National Bank of Poland; Gosbank (East Prussia); Banque de France (Alsace-Lorraine); National Bank of Belgium (Luxembourg)

The Reichsbank (German: [ˈʁaɪçsˌbank]; lit. 'Bank of the Reich') was the central bank of the German Empire from 1876 until the end of Nazi Germany in 1945.

== Background ==
The monetary institutions in Germany had been unsuited for its economic development for several decades before unification. In the Kingdom of Prussia, the Bank of Prussia had been established in 1847 and, in the aftermath of the revolution of 1848, five additional banks had been granted a note-issuance privilege (the Berliner Kassenverein, Kölnische Privatbank, Magdeburger Privatbank, Ritterschaftliche Privatbank in Pommern at Stettin, and Städtische Bank in Breslau), but that was still insufficient to sustain adequate monetary conditions. By 1851, 9 banks in the whole of Germany (not including Austria), known as Notenbanken, were chartered to issue banknotes. In addition, most German states - with the only exceptions of Lippe and the Hanseatic cities of Bremen, Hamburg and Lübeck - issued government paper money without the intermediation of an issuing bank.

Several pan-German conventions were held with the aim of simplifying and rationalizing the German monetary system, e.g., in Vienna on 24 January 1857, but to no avail. Instead, the number of Notenbanken kept growing, reaching 31 (in the territories that would become the German Reich) in 1870. They were typically private-sector entities, albeit often under hands-on government oversight, except the Bank of Bremen and Frankfurter Bank which were comparatively independent. Twelve of these were in Prussia, four in the Kingdom of Saxony, one in the Kingdom of Bavaria, and the other 14 in various duchies, principalities and free cities.

On 27 March 1870, a law was passed that forbade the formation of further Notenbanken in the North German Confederation. Following the promulgation of the German Empire, that law was extended to all German lands, with entry into force on 1 January 1872. These Prussian initiatives precipitated action by the Grand Duchy of Baden and Kingdom of Württemberg to create note-issuing banks of their own, respectively the Badische Bank in Mannheim (est. 1870) and the Württembergische Notenbank in Stuttgart (est. 1871), bringing the total number of Notenbanken to 33. The panic of 1873 further stimulated discussions on the creation of an integrated monetary system, which pitted advocates of centralization led by Ludwig Bamberger against the incumbent local banks of issue and defenders of state rights, led by Ludolf Camphausen. The political compromise was to allow the latter to keep issuance activity but under such restrictions that they rapidly fell into monetary irrelevance.

== German Empire ==
The currency reform that preceded the Reichsbank was enacted in stages. The law of 4 December 1871 named one tenth of a new imperial gold coin a mark, divided it into 100 pfennigs and authorized gold coins of 10 and 20 marks. The Coinage Act of 9 July 1873 made the mark the unit of account of the Reich gold currency, which was to replace the state currencies. An imperial ordinance of 22 September 1875 set 1 January 1876 as the date on which the Reich currency came into force throughout Germany.

The Reichsbank was established by legislation passed by the Reichstag on 14 March 1875, and began operations on the same date that the Reich currency came into force, 1 January 1876, when it succeeded the Bank of Prussia. Meanwhile, between 1873 and 1875 the Bank of Prussia assumed all the assets and liabilities of the Hamburger Bank, which was a major monetary anchor in Northern Germany.

The conversion of the existing coinage continued after the bank opened. The government withdrew old silver coins, melted them and sold the bullion. Because the silver price had fallen and losses were mounting, the sales were suspended on 19 May 1879. German one-thaler pieces remained legal tender at three marks each through 30 September 1907. They ceased to be legal tender on 1 October 1907, but Reich and state treasuries continued to accept or exchange them at three marks until 30 September 1908.

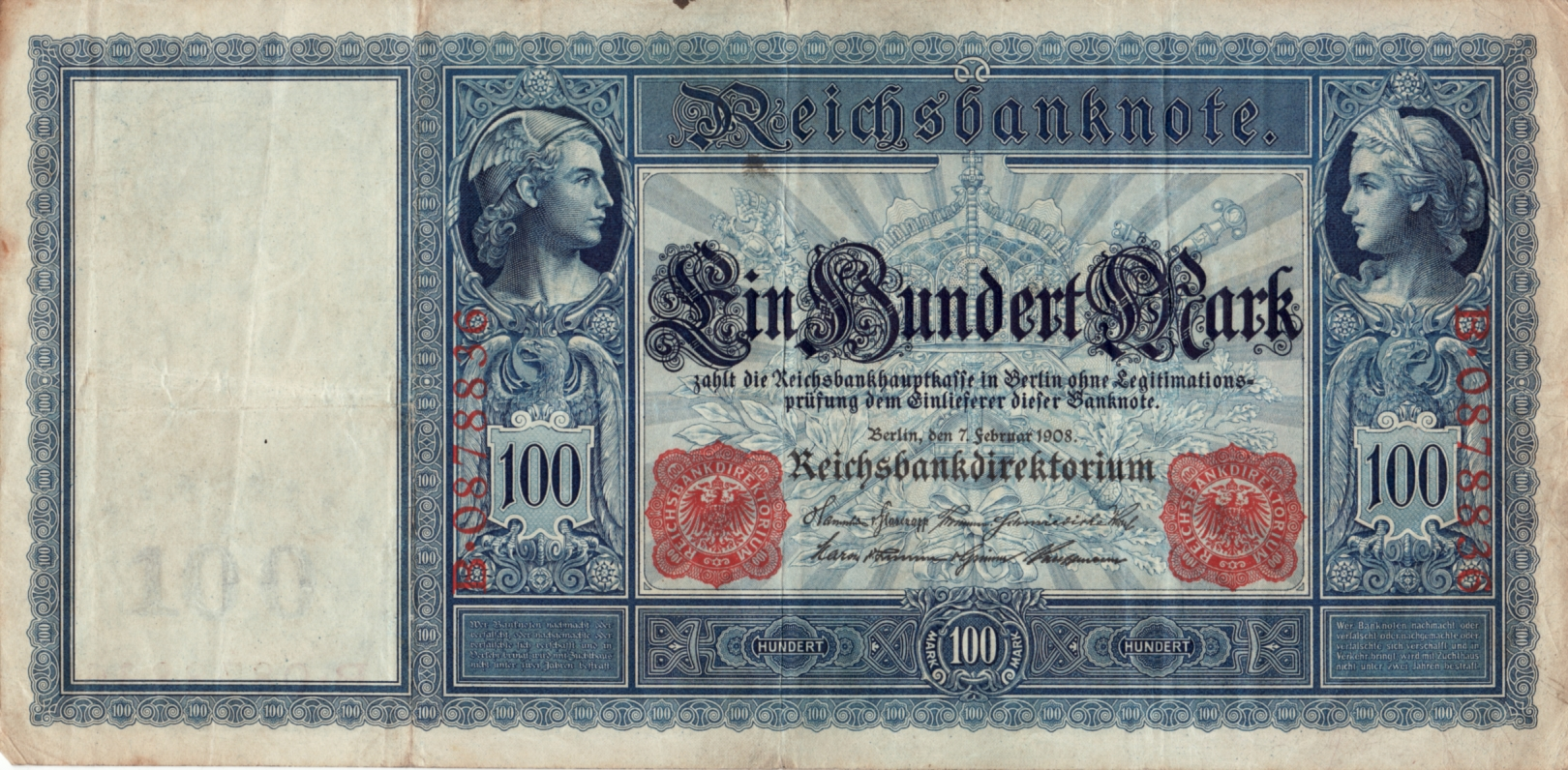
A 100-Goldmark banknote issued by the German Reichsbank in 1908

The Reichsbank was technically a private-sector company with individual shareholders, albeit not in joint-stock form, and operated from the start under the close control of the Reich government. The bank was managed by a management board (German: Direktorium) reporting to a supervisory board (German: Curatorium). The Curatorium was chaired by the Imperial Chancellor and included four additional members, one appointed by the emperor and the other three by the Bundesrat; it was to meet every three months. The Direktorium was led by the President (German: Reichsbankpräsident) and all its members were appointed for life by the emperor, upon nomination by the Bundesrat. The law specified that the Direktorium must obey the Chancellor's orders at all times. The shareholders were represented in a central committee (German: Zentralausschuss) of 15 members, which met at least every month under the chairmanship of the Reichsbank's president and could scrutinize the management but not change it or influence policy decisions. Three deputies of the Zentralausschuss were allowed to attend all meetings of the Direktorium and to examine the books of the Reichsbank. The initial shareholders included the former shareholders of the Bank of Prussia (except a few who opted for selling their shares) and new subscribers. The bank was exempted from all income and trade taxes, but also had to act as the Reich's fiscal agent without compensation.

Under the Bank Act, at least one third of the notes in circulation had to be covered by German coin, imperial treasury notes, bullion or foreign coin. A 5 percent tax applied when the amount of notes not covered by cash exceeded a fixed quota.

The Reichsbank operated throughout the Reich's territory through a network of branches, which numbered 206 at its inception in 1876 and expanded to 330 by 1900. A formal distinction was made between main branches (German: Reichsbankhauptstellen), whose heads were appointed directly by the emperor, and other branches (German: Reichsbankstellen), but that difference of status was insubstantial in practice. The bank's employees had the status of civil servants of the Reich, even though they were paid by the Reichsbank. The bank also linked its branches through a giro system that transferred payments between accounts without charge. This turned what had been largely local transfer business into a national payments network. The Reichsbank sponsored the establishment of clearing houses in the 1880s and 1890s in Berlin, Frankfurt, Stuttgart, Cologne, Leipzig (Petersstrasse), Dresden, Hamburg, Breslau, Bremen, and Elberfeld.

Most of the Reichsbank's initial branches were inherited from the Bank of Prussia, while new offices were added in Augsburg, Nuremberg, Gera, and Lübeck. Its cash offices also had to check gold coins against the legally required weight: ten- and twenty-mark pieces that had fallen below the minimum pass weight could not be put back into circulation. A coin worn down through ordinary use was withdrawn at the Reich's expense, while one that had been deliberately reduced was accepted only below its face value. In 1877, the Reichsbank's Lübeck cash office found 20-mark pieces that had been deliberately reduced in weight. The case became known as the Doppelkronensache and was settled out of court the following January.

15 of the 32 Notenbanken (other than the Bank of Prussia) ceased issuing their own banknotes shortly after the Reichsbank's creation; four more did so in the 1880s, six in the 1890s, and three in the early 1900s, leaving only the Bayerische Notenbank, Bank of Baden, Bank of Saxony and Württembergische Notenbank as residual note-issuing institutions by 1906.

The Doppelkronensache was kept confidential to avoid damaging confidence in the new gold currency. Until World War I, the Reichsbank maintained the currency's convertibility into gold; it became known as the German gold mark. In 1909, an amendment to the Banking Act of 1875 made the Reichsbank's notes legal tender and redeemable at the rate of 2790 Marks per kilogram of gold. In the period immediately before the war erupted, the Reichsbank greatly increased its gold reserves, as also did the Bank of France, Bank of Russia and Austro-Hungarian Bank, from an equivalent US$184 million on 31 December 1912 to $336 million on 30 June 1914. On 31 July 1914, the Reichsbank stopped redeeming its notes in gold, beginning the Papiermark period. The government financed much of the war through borrowing rather than higher taxes and increasingly borrowed from the Reichsbank, which issued more banknotes.

== Weimar Republic ==
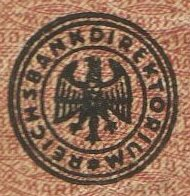
Stamp of the Reichsbank, 1922

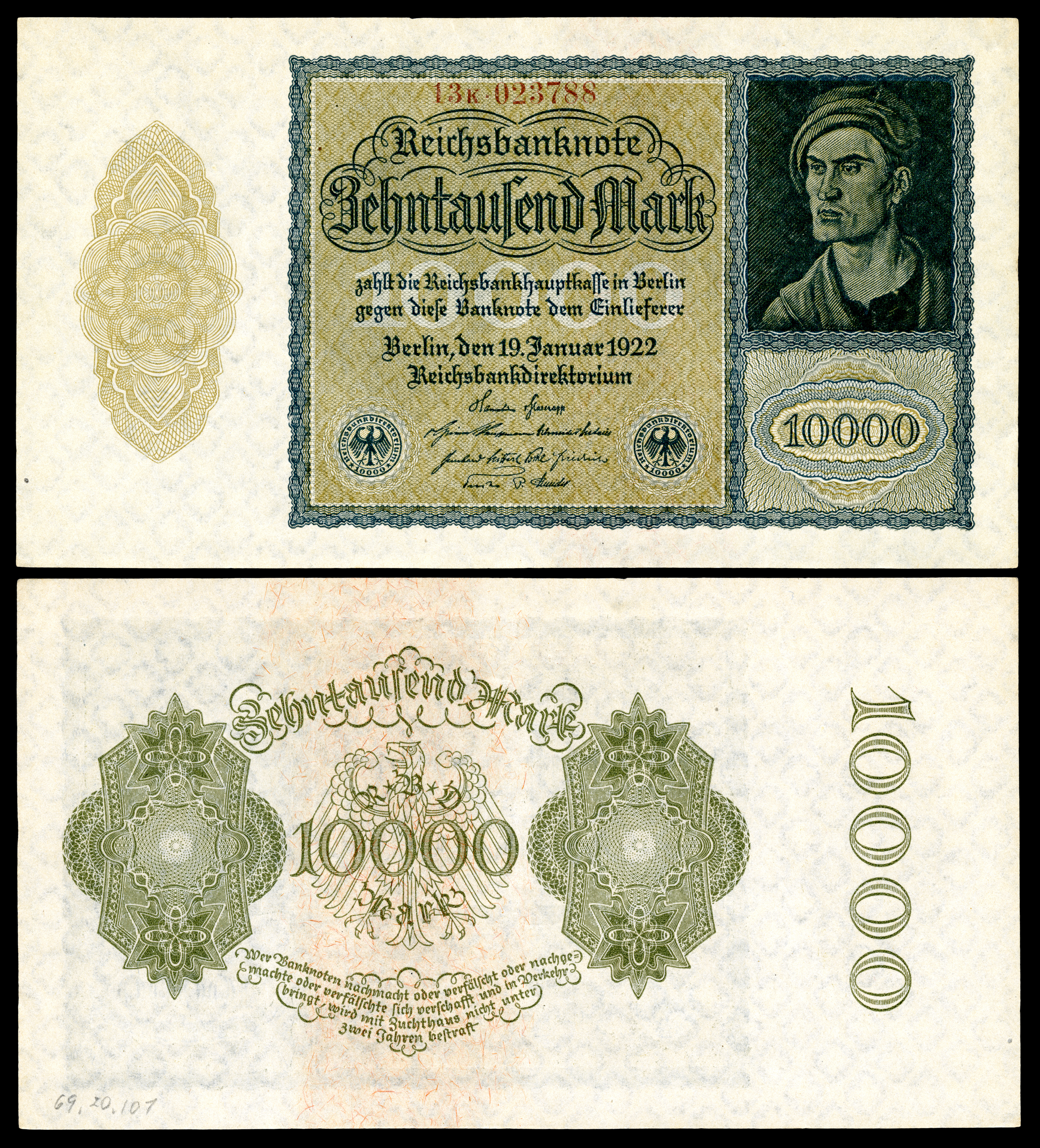
A 10000 Mark banknote issued by the German Reichsbank in 1922

Following Germany's defeat and the 1919 Treaty of Versailles, the German government was unable to meet its expenditures and commitments by taxation and borrowing from external sources, and instead turned to the Reichsbank for monetary financing. This, combined with the government's reaction to the occupation of the Ruhr by France and Belgium, triggered a dramatic episode of hyperinflation that rendered the Mark practically worthless. The Reichsbank only started raising its discount rate in July 1922, reaching 40 percent per day at the hyperinflationary peak in November 1923. By decree of 15 October 1923 on the initiative of finance minister Hans Luther, the government created a separate bank, the Deutsche Rentenbank, endowed with the right to issue notes (German: Rentenbankscheine) redeemable in a kind of non-interest-bearing mortgage bond, the Rentenbrief, denominated in gold Mark and theoretically backed by a collective mortgage debt imposed upon German agriculture and industry. That confidence-building initiative succeeded against all expectations, even though the Rentenbankscheine only had the status of "legally admitted medium of exchange" while the Reichsbank's devalued paper notes remained legal tender. No fixed exchange rate was set by law, but the "Rentenmark" became interchangeable with paper Mark at the rate of one to one trillion. The Rentenmark was thus in effect a transitory domestic currency, which was never convertible internationally.

The success of the Rentenmark, followed by the Dawes Plan on war reparations, paved the way for a restoration of monetary order. The Banking Law of 30 August 1924 was inspired by the stabilization loans orchestrated by the Economic and Financial Organization of the League of Nations that had entailed the creation of the Oesterreichische Nationalbank in January 1923 and of the Hungarian National Bank in June 1924. It comprehensively reformed the Reichsbank and made it, for the first time, an explicitly independent central bank. Its Kuratorium was replaced by a General Council (German: Generalrat) consisting of 7 German and 7 foreign members, which was to elect the bank's president subject to approval of the President of Germany. The General Council also elected one of its foreign members to serve as Currency Commissioner (German: Kommissar für die Notenausgabe) supervising note issuance. The ability of the reformed Reichsbank to extend credit to the Reich government was strictly limited. The new currency, the Reichsmark (RM), was set at one trillion paper Mark, restoring the prewar parity of 2790 RM for one kilogram of fine gold; the pre-reform notes ceased to be legal tender on 5 June 1925.

In the subsequent period of deflation, the Reichsbank became practically the only source of short-term banking credit in the German economy, which it chose to ration (maintaining a discount rate of no more than 10 percent) rather than lend at high market-determined rates. The Reichsbank's credit rationing only ended in early 1926, after which the discount rate could be gradually lowered, reaching 5 percent in 1927. In 1930, legislative amendments in line with the Young Plan brought an end to the involvement of foreigners in the Reichsbank's governance. The General Council was reduced to 10 members, all German, and the role of Currency Commissioner went to the President of the Rechnungshof des Deutschen Reiches.

== Nazi period ==
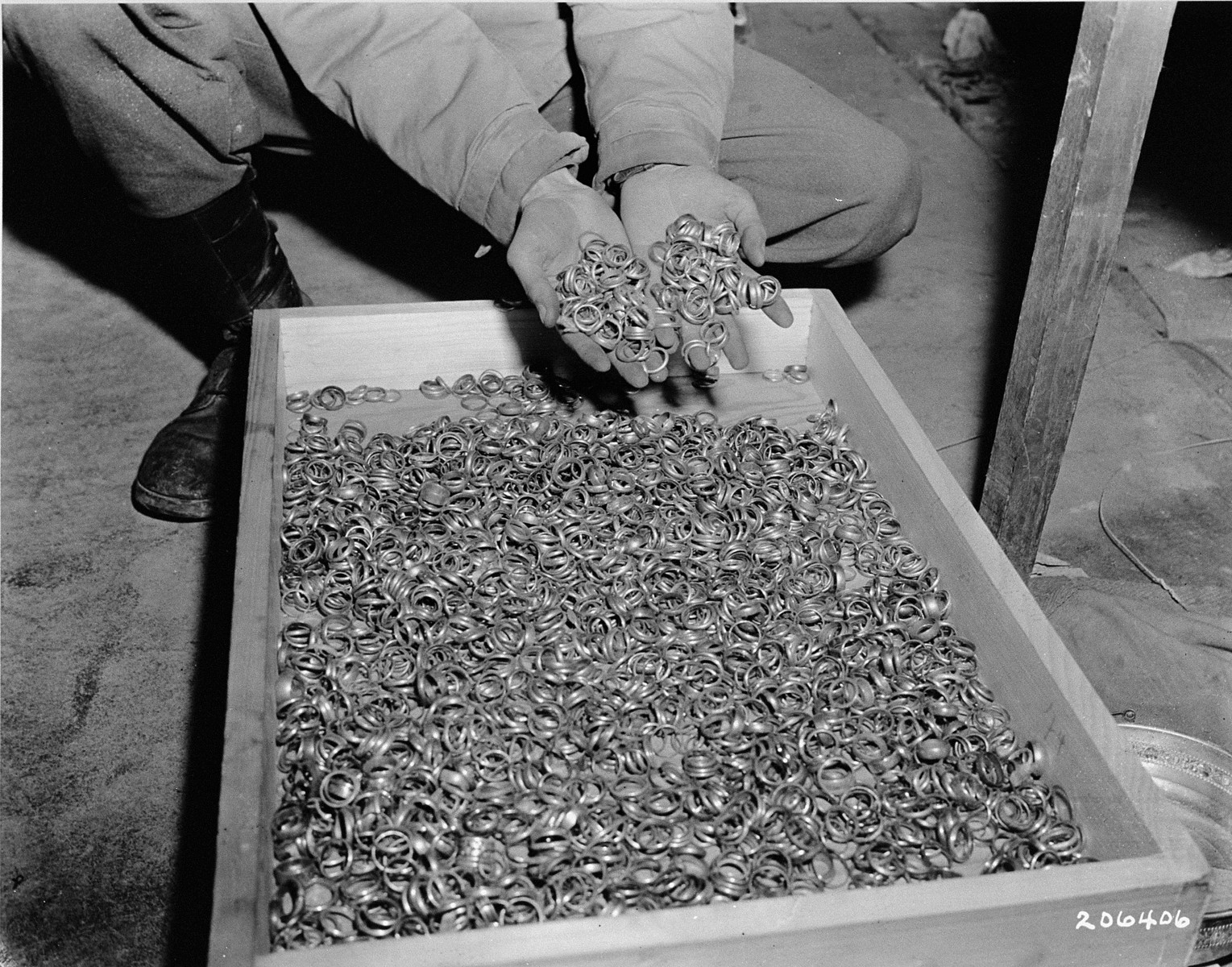
As Minister of Economics, Walther Funk accelerated the pace of rearmament and, as Reichsbank president, banked the confiscated gold rings of Buchenwald prisoners for the SS

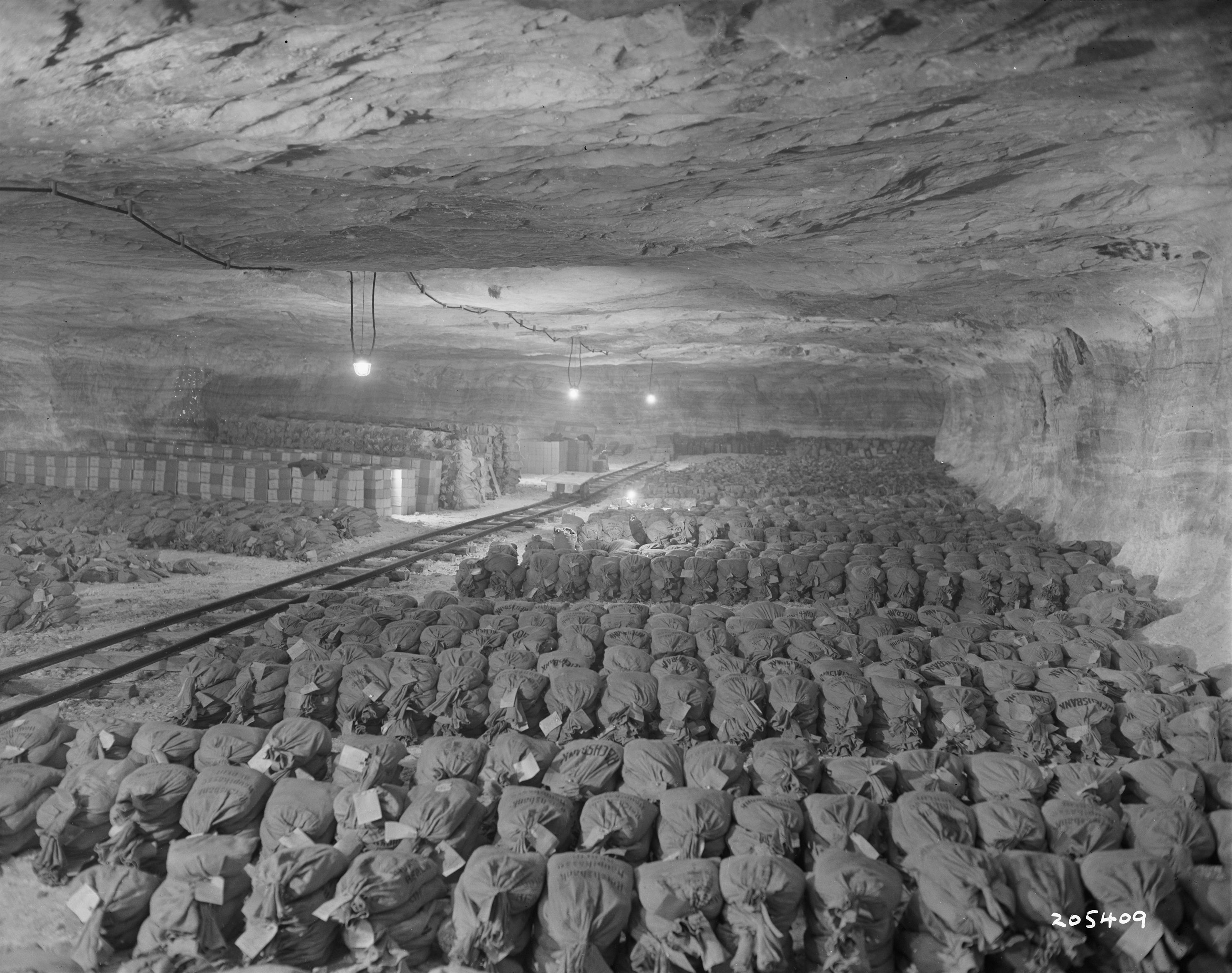
Nazi gold in Merkers Salt Mine

The Nazi regime promptly put an end to the independence of the Reichsbank and made it an instrument of its policy of directing Germany's resources towards rearmament and military expansion. Under an amendment of 27 October 1933 to the Banking Law, the General Council was abolished, and the members of the Direktorium, including the President, were henceforth to be directly appointed and dismissed by the Führer.

On 31 December 1935, the Reichsbank's note-issuing privilege became exclusive, bringing an end to the residual central banking roles of the Bank of Baden, Bayerische Notenbank, Bank of Saxony, and Württembergische Notenbank.

On 30 January 1937, Hitler publicly proclaimed the unlimited sovereignty of the Reich over the Reichsbank, and a law of 18 February 1937 formally abolished the Reichsbank's autonomous status. Meanwhile, the Reichsbank gradually became deeply concerned with the direction of public finance under Nazi leadership. On 7 January 1939, all eight members of the Direktorium signed a memorandum to Hitler warning against uncontrolled expenditure, adding: "It is our duty to warn against this assault on the currency." Two weeks later, Hitler fired Schacht and replaced him with Walther Funk, a former journalist and Nazi loyalist. Most of the other Direktorium members resigned. A subsequent law of 15 June 1939 stipulated that the President and Direktorium should directly receive their instructions from the Führer and renamed the bank Deutsche Reichsbank. During most of the Nazi period, the same individual was President of the Reichsbank and Minister of the Economy, namely Schacht from August 1934 to November 1937 and Funk from January 1939 to May 1945.

During the war, the Reichsbank received central bank gold and private assets seized in occupied Europe. Its Precious Metals Department also processed SS deliveries that included jewellery and dental gold taken from people murdered in concentration and extermination camps. The proceeds were credited to an account that used the fictitious name Max Heiliger.

In April and May 1945, the remaining reserves of the Reichsbank, including gold (730 bars), cash (6 large sacks), and precious stones and metals such as platinum (25 sealed boxes), were dispatched by Walther Funk to be buried on the Klausenhof Mountain at Einsiedl in Bavaria, where the final German resistance was to be concentrated. Similarly, the Abwehr cash reserves were hidden nearby in Garmisch-Partenkirchen. Shortly after the American forces overran the area, the reserves and money disappeared. At Nuremberg, the International Military Tribunal found that gold from victims' teeth and dental fillings had been stored in Reichsbank vaults. It concluded that Funk knew what the bank was receiving or had deliberately ignored it, and convicted him of war crimes and crimes against humanity. The disappearance of the Reichsbank reserves in 1945 was investigated by Bill Stanley Moss and Andrew Kennedy in postwar Germany.

== Aftermath and liquidation ==
In line with decisions made at the Potsdam Conference, the Reichsbank was placed under joint Allied custodianship pending its liquidation. The four occupying powers (France, the Soviet Union, the United Kingdom and the United States) initially continued to issue Reichsmarks and Allied military marks. In Austria, the Oesterreichische Nationalbank was re-established by the Central Bank Transition Act of 3 July 1945 of the Second Austrian Republic.

In line with the Morgenthau Plan, the American authorities in November 1945 proposed a radically decentralized plan that would have organized a separate financial system in each of the Länder, with minimal central coordination. After some hesitancy, the French authorities came to support that vision; the British authorities were initially reluctant, but gradually aligned with U.S. views following the establishment of the Bizone on 1 January 1947. Thus, Land central banks (German: Landeszentralbanken) were created on 1 January 1947 in American-occupied Munich (for Bavaria), Stuttgart (for Württemberg-Baden), and Wiesbaden (for Hesse), followed in March by French-occupied Tübingen (for Württemberg-Hohenzollern), Freiburg im Breisgau (for South Baden), and Mainz (for Rhineland-Palatinate), then American-occupied Bremen on 1 April 1947, and eventually British-occupied Düsseldorf (for North Rhine-Westphalia), Hanover (for Lower Saxony), Kiel (for Schleswig-Holstein) and Hamburg by the spring of 1948.

In the Soviet occupation zone, ostensibly similar entities dubbed Emissions- und Girobanken were established in May 1947 in each of the zone's five provinces, namely in Potsdam for Brandenburg, Rostock for Mecklenburg, Dresden for Saxony, Halle for Saxony-Anhalt, and Erfurt for Thuringia. Each of these was fully owned and controlled by the respective provincial authorities.

In 1947, newly appointed U.S. Military Governor Lucius D. Clay decided, against directives from Washington, that Germany needed a central bank instead of a mere board bringing together the Landeszentralbanken for joint policy decisions. An agreement on that concept was reached among the three Western occupying forces on 30 October 1947, resulting in the establishment on 1 March 1948 of the Bank deutscher Länder. On 21 May 1948, the Soviet occupation authorities replied by establishing a Deutsche Emissions- und Girobank in Potsdam, which was renamed Deutsche Notenbank in July, later relocated to East Berlin, and in 1968 was rebranded the Staatsbank der DDR.

Given Berlin's special situation, no Landeszentralbank was initially established there. Plans for a separate currency for all of Berlin were considered up until June 1948, when the situation came to a head and the introduction of Western German marks into West Berlin precipitated the Berlin Blockade. Only after the blockade ended was the Berliner Zentralbank established on 20 March 1949 and initially operated under an association agreement with the Bank deutscher Länder. It was eventually converted into a Landeszentralbank in 1957.

The Reichsbank itself went into a protracted process of liquidation. In 1955, a Federal German Law allowed holders of Reichsbank common stock to exchange it for interim certificates of the Bank Deutscher Länder. In 1957, the residual liquidation tasks were entrusted to Fritz Paersch, who during the war had overseen the Bank of Issue in Poland for the Reichsbank. A federal law of 2 August 1961 dissolved the Reichsbank and ordered its liquidation.

== Head office ==
The Bank of Prussia commissioned Friedrich Hitzig to replace its old Jägerstrasse premises with a new head office. Work on the complex began in 1869 and continued until 1878; the Reichsbank occupied it when operations began in 1876. The 1892 to 1894 extension at Hausvogteiplatz was designed by Julius Emmerich and Max Hasak. The bank later built another extension across Kurstrasse. Designed by Reichsbank architect Heinrich Wolff, it was completed in 1940. The 1940 extension survives as the Haus am Werderschen Markt; it housed the SED Central Committee from 1959 to 1990 and is now part of the German Federal Foreign Office.

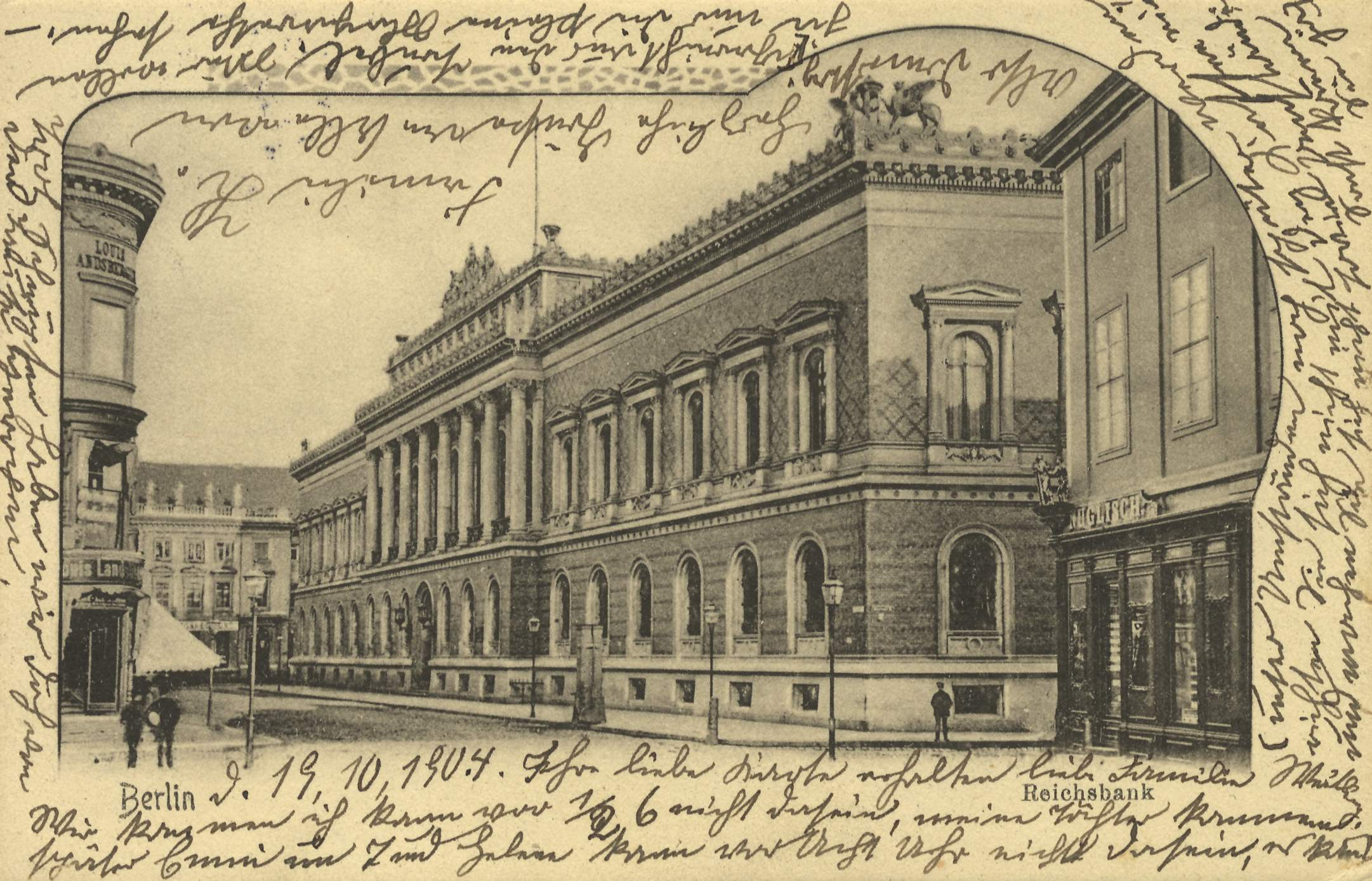
The Reichsbank on a postcard sent in 1904

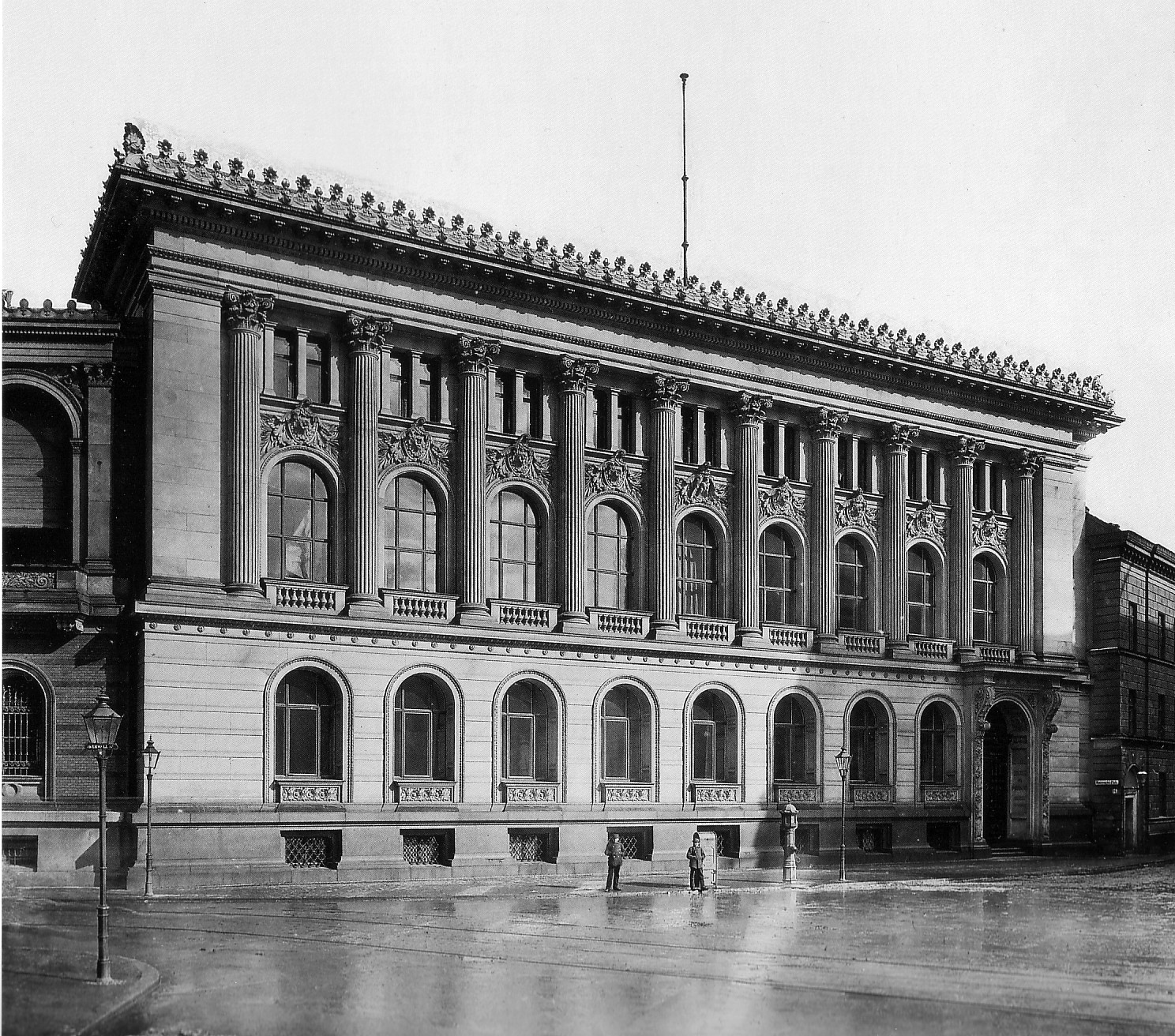
Extension on Hausvogteiplatz, photographed in 1903

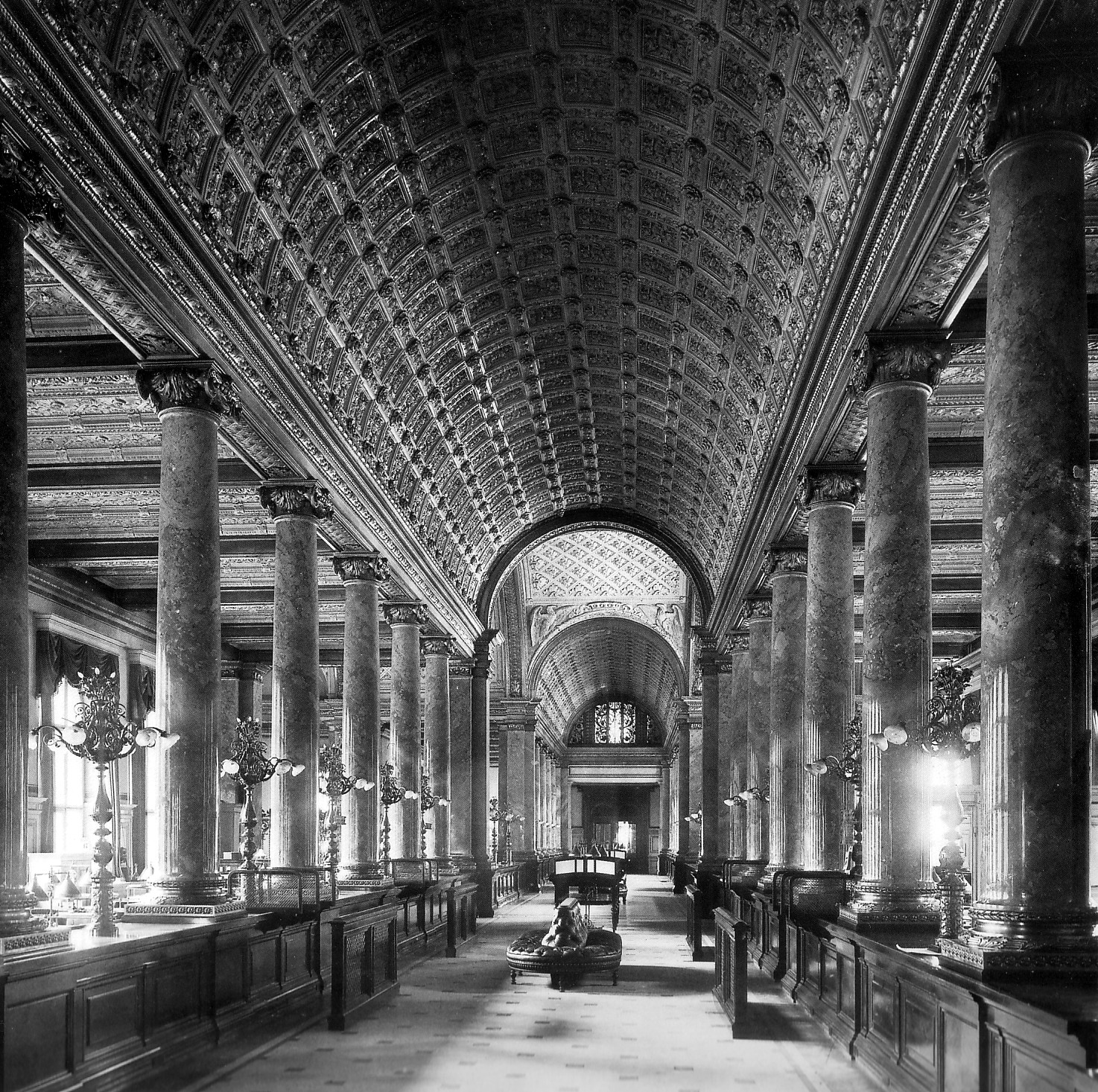
Banking hall of the Reichsbank, part of the 1890s extension

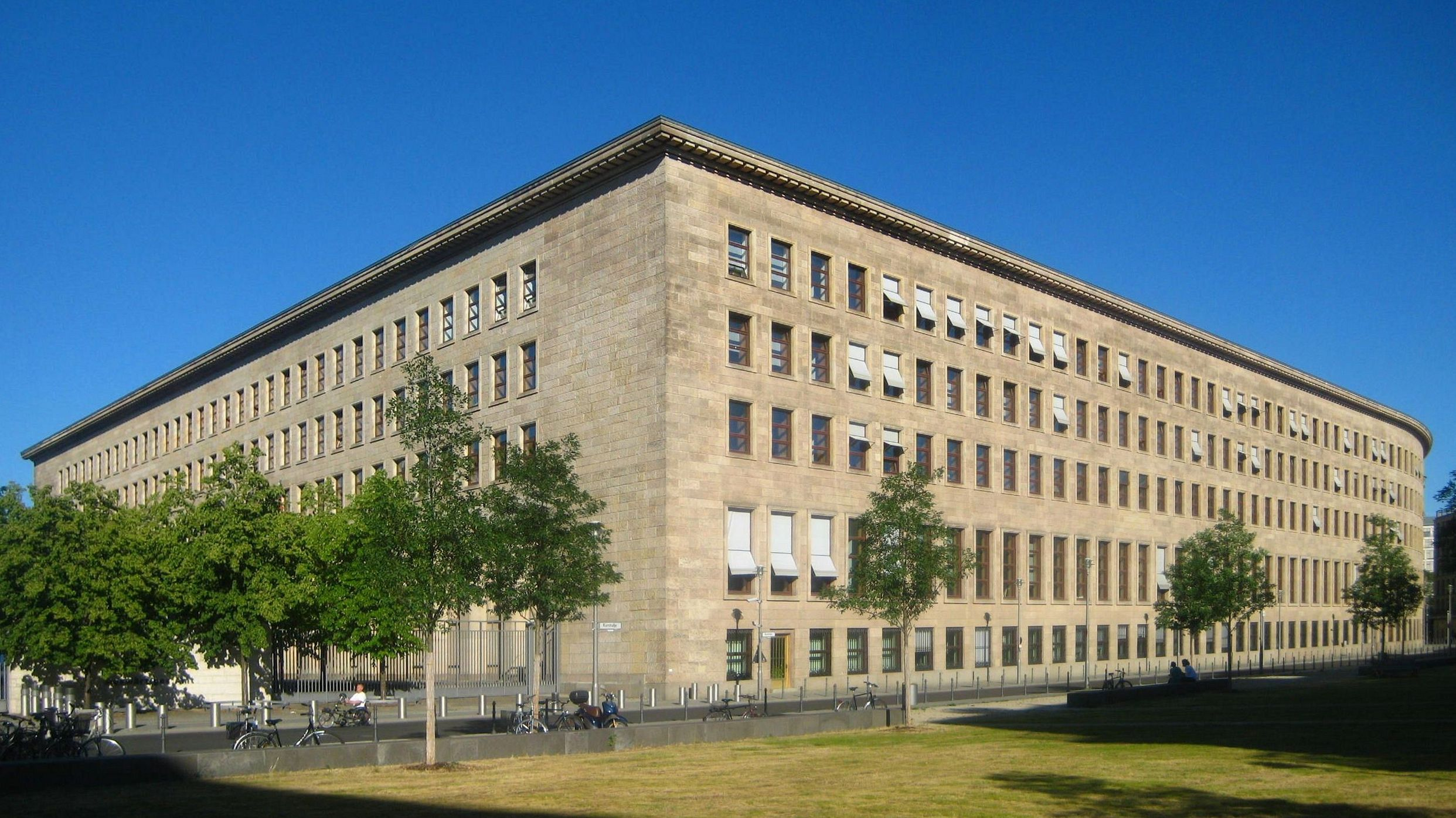
1930s extension (Haus am Werderschen Markt)

== Branches ==
In Prussia, the Reichsbank kept the branches it inherited from the Bank of Prussia, including buildings it had purchased from others (e.g. the palace erected by David Schindelmeißer in Königsberg, acquired in 1843) and those it had built for itself (e.g. in Bromberg in 1864). Elsewhere, it did not take over the properties of banks whose monetary role it replaced and erected new branch buildings instead. By the end of the 19th century, it had built new branches in most of Germany's significant cities. In some cases, these branches were replaced by more modern ones in the interwar period.

The Reichsbank employed a number of specialized architects for branch design, including the prolific Max Hasak and Julius Emmerich from the 1880s to the early 1900s, Havestadt & Contag in the 1890s and early 1900s, Curjel & Moser in the 1900s, Julius Habicht and Hermann Stiller in the 1900s and 1910s, Philipp Nitze in the 1910s and 1920s, and Heinrich Wolff in the 1920s and 1930s.

After World War I, Reichsbank buildings in territory ceded to the Second Polish Republic were transferred to the Polish state bank. Many branch buildings survived World War II and continued in banking use. In West Germany, the Landeszentralbanken initially took them over; buildings in East Germany and Poland also remained in use by state banks. The Munich branch, whose construction had started in 1938 on the site of the former Herzog-Max-Palais, was only completed in 1951. Some buildings were later demolished, including the Chemnitz branch in 1964. Others were repurposed, such as the Bucerius Kunst Forum in Hamburg and the Dommuseum Ottonianum in Magdeburg.

The addresses indicated below are the latest ones, which sometimes differ from original addresses due to street renaming and/or renumbering.

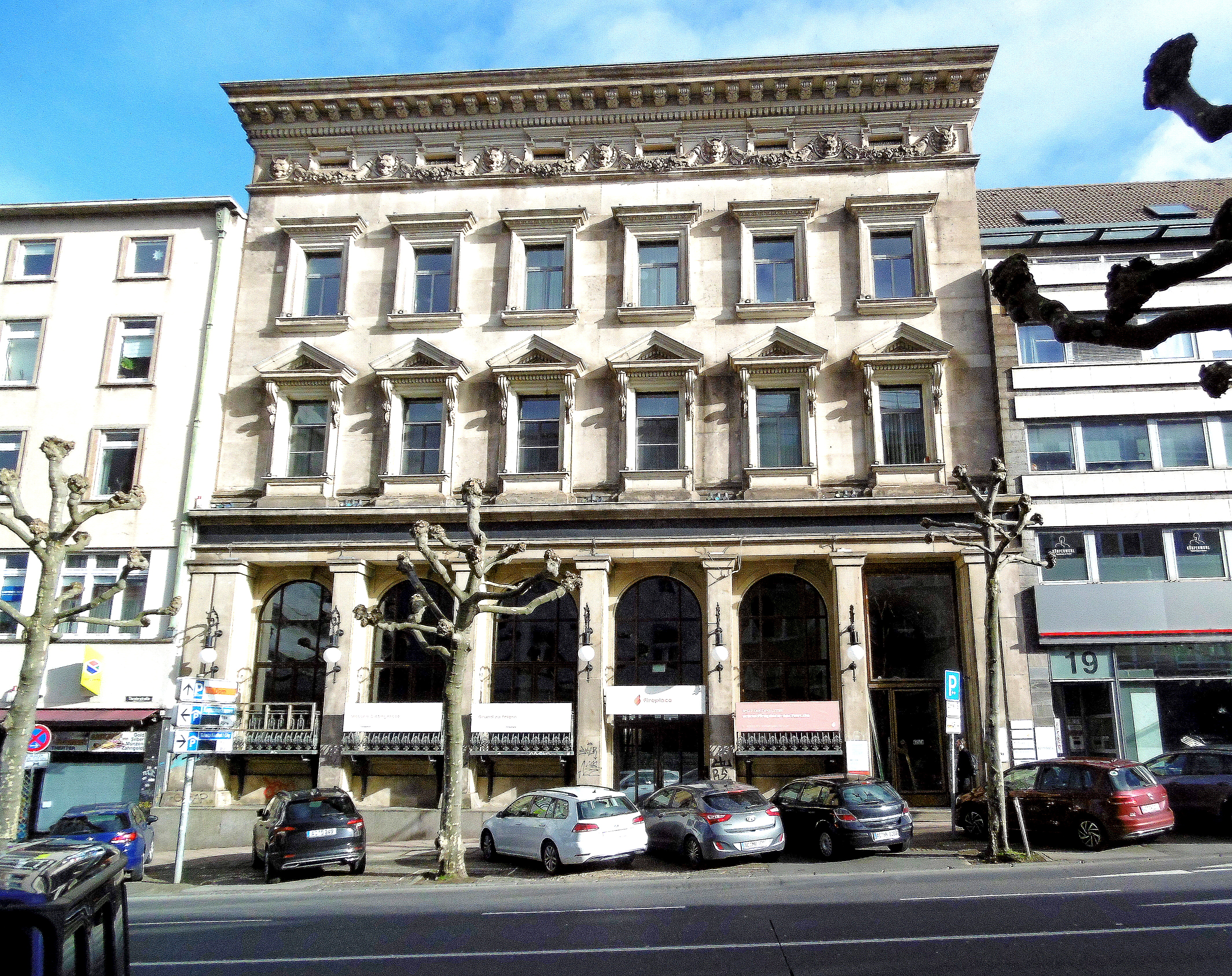
Aachen branch, Theaterstrasse 17 (arch. Hasak), completed 1889

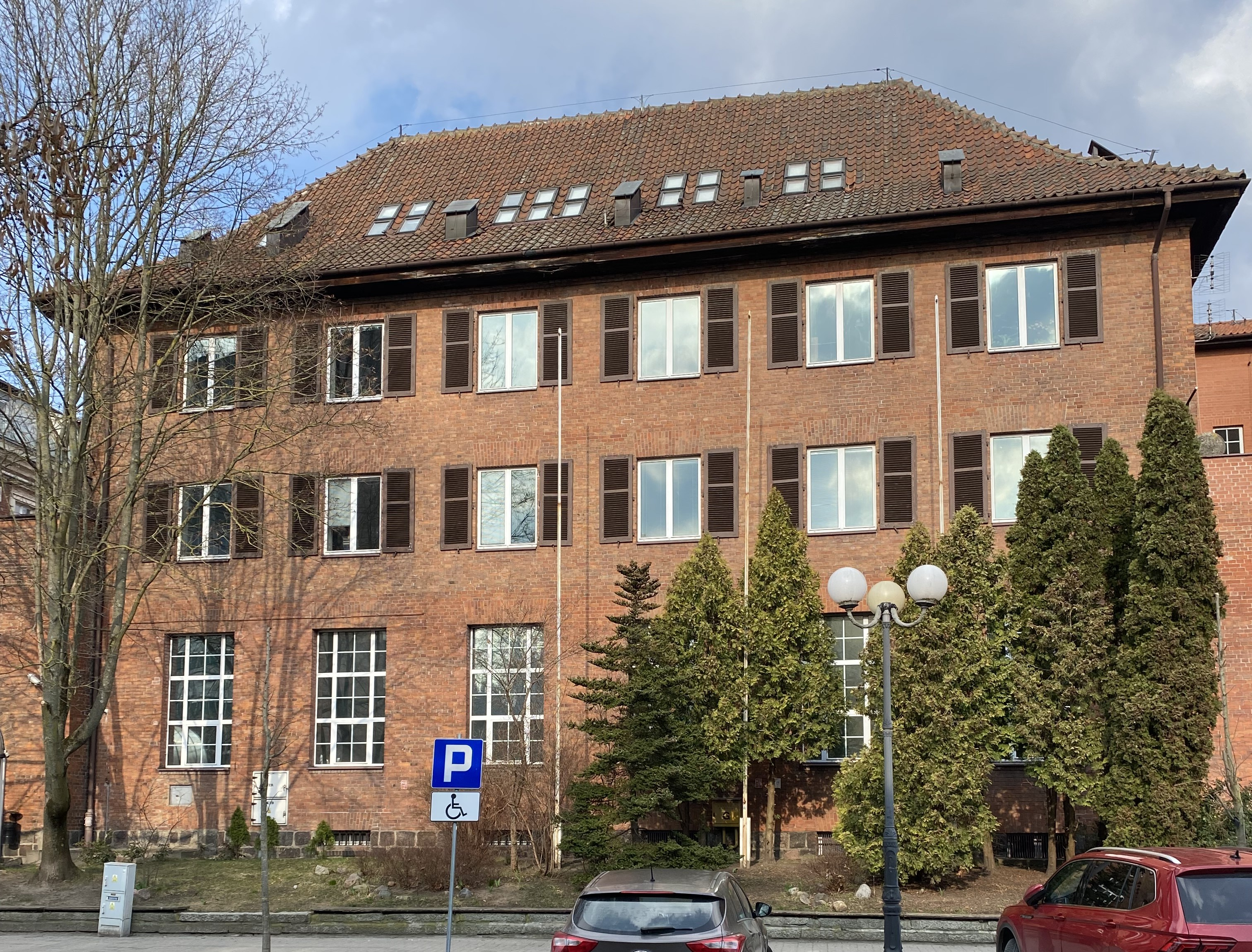
Allenstein (now Olsztyn) branch, ulica Dąbrowszczaków (former Kaiserstrasse) 11, completed 1923

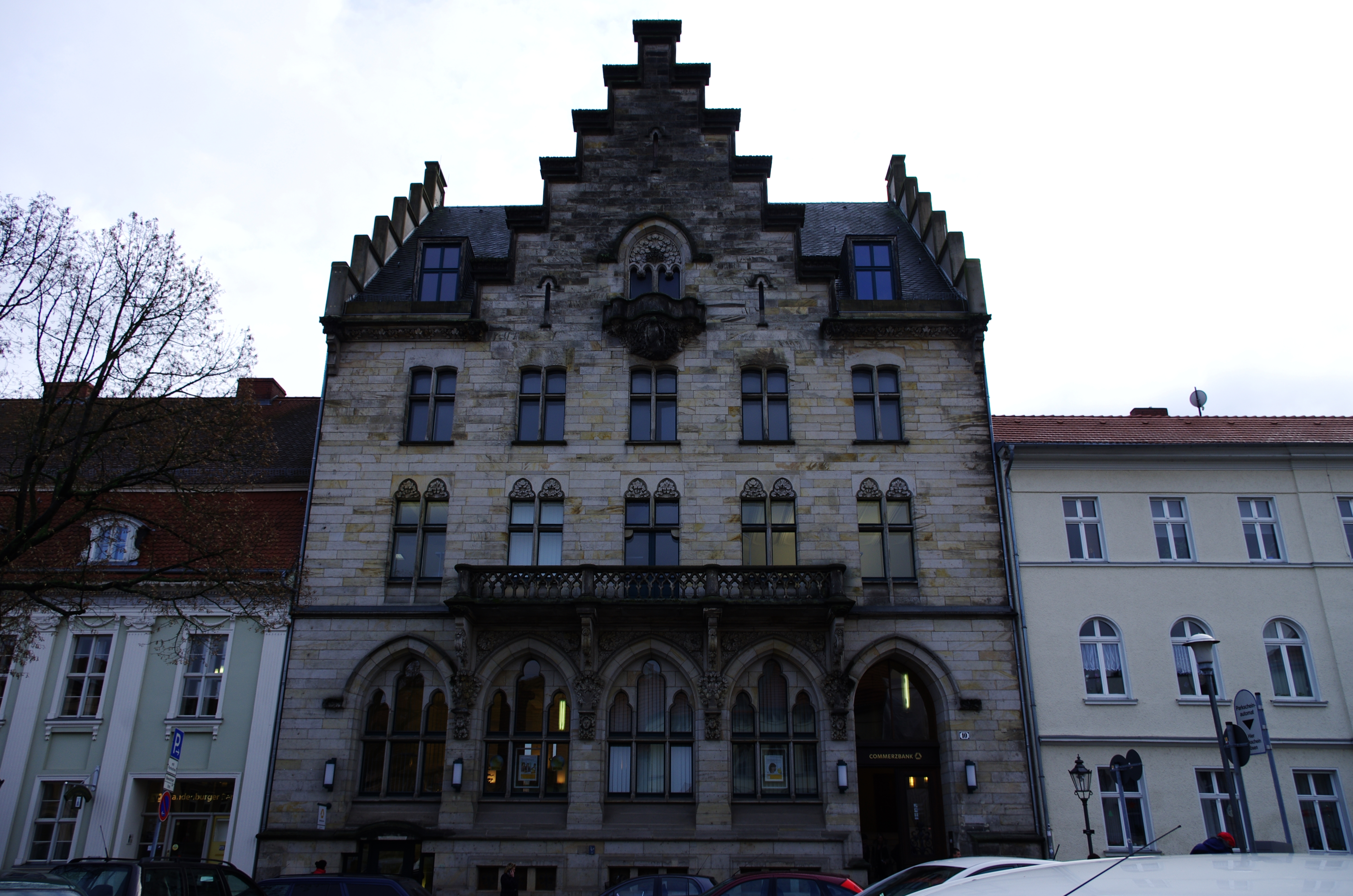
Brandenburg branch, Neustädter Markt 10 (arch. Hasak), completed 1902

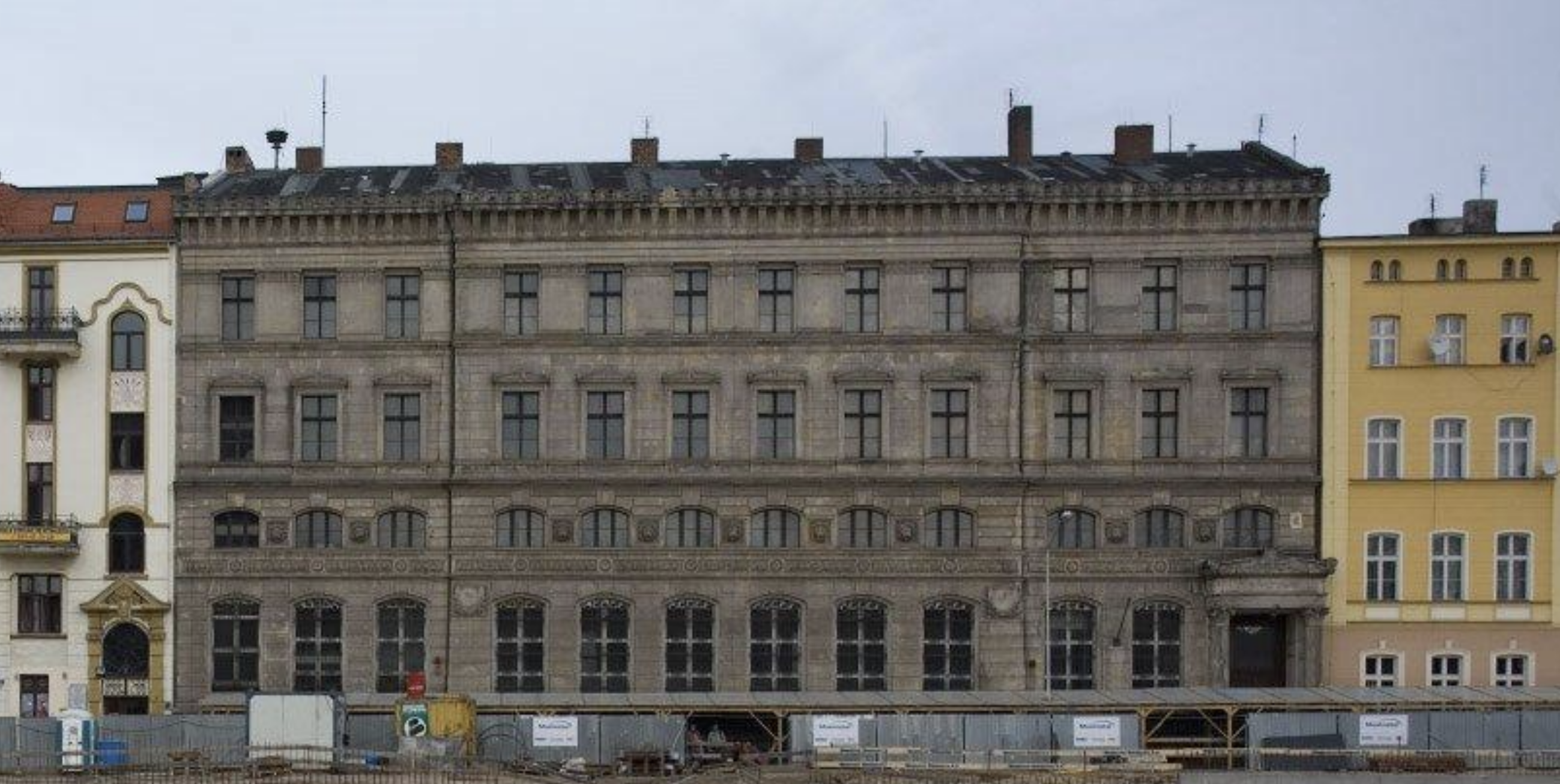
Breslau (now Wrocław) branch, 10 Wolności Square, completed 1890

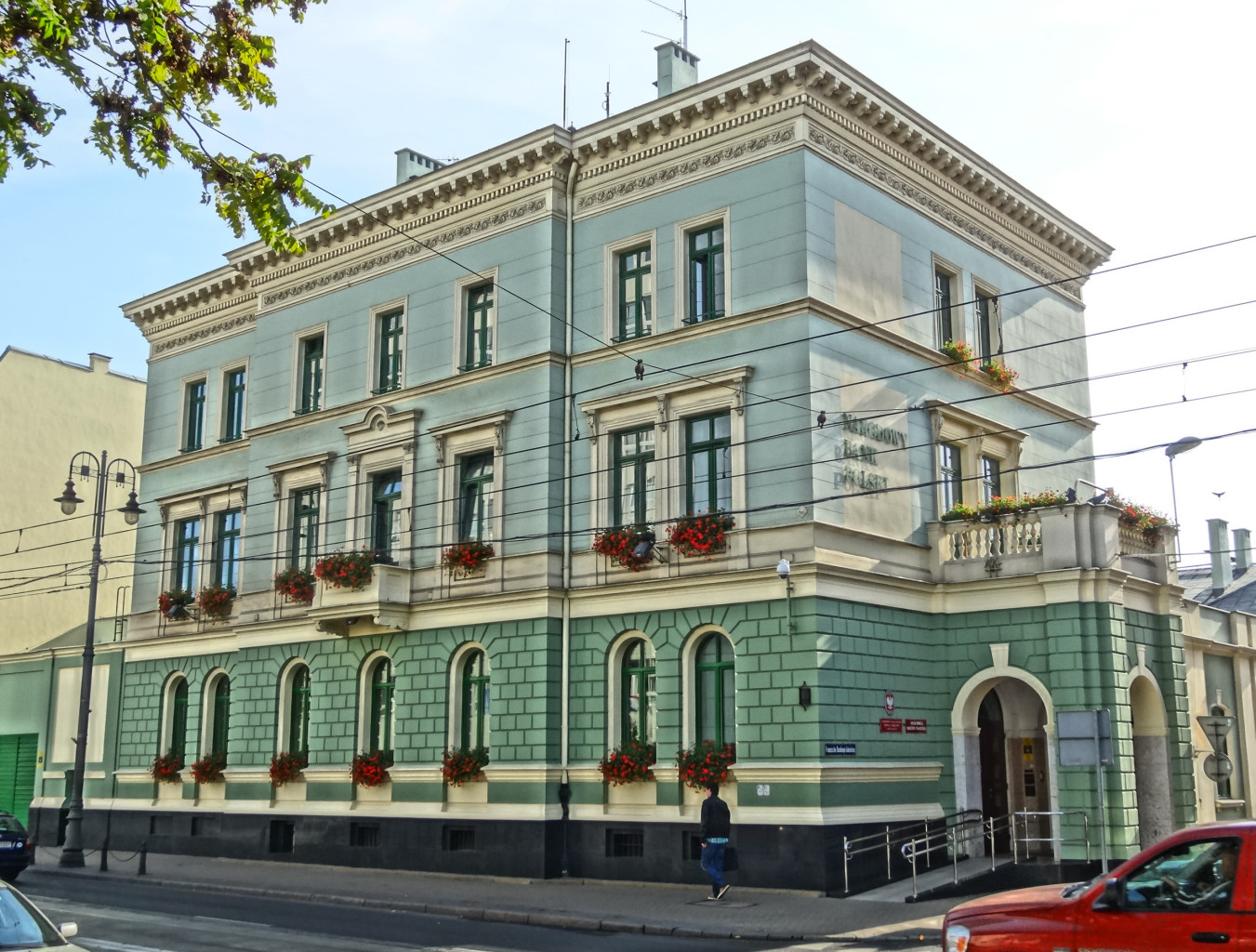
Bromberg (now Bydgoszcz) branch, Jagiellońska street 8 (arch. Hermann Cuno), completed 1864

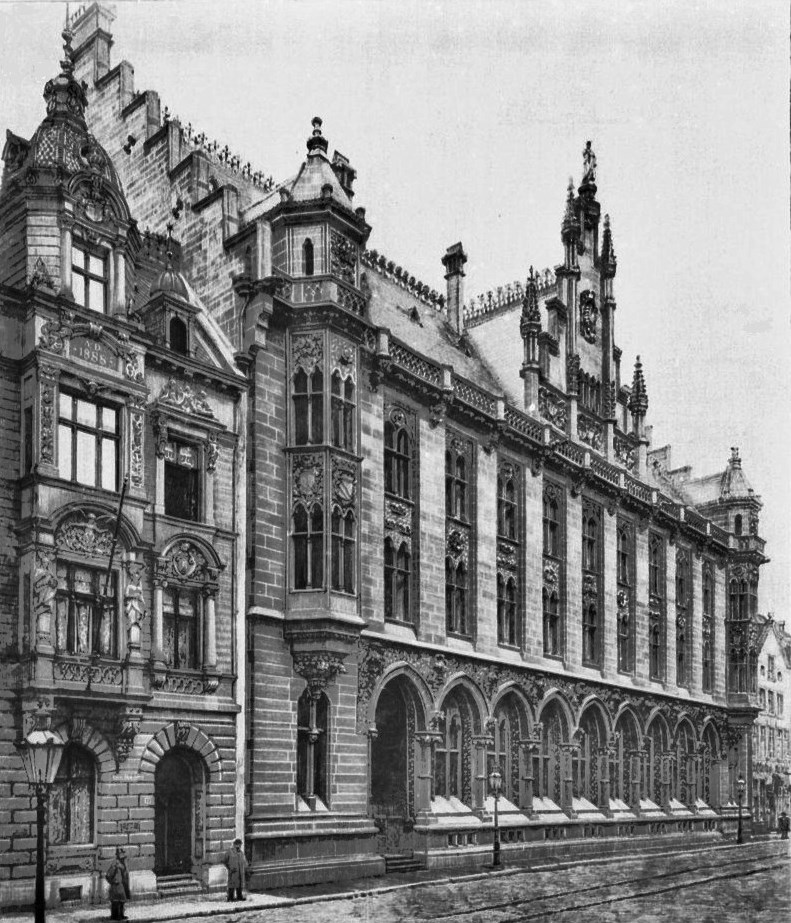
Cologne branch, Unter Sachsenhausen 1-3 (arch. Hasak), upon completion in 1896

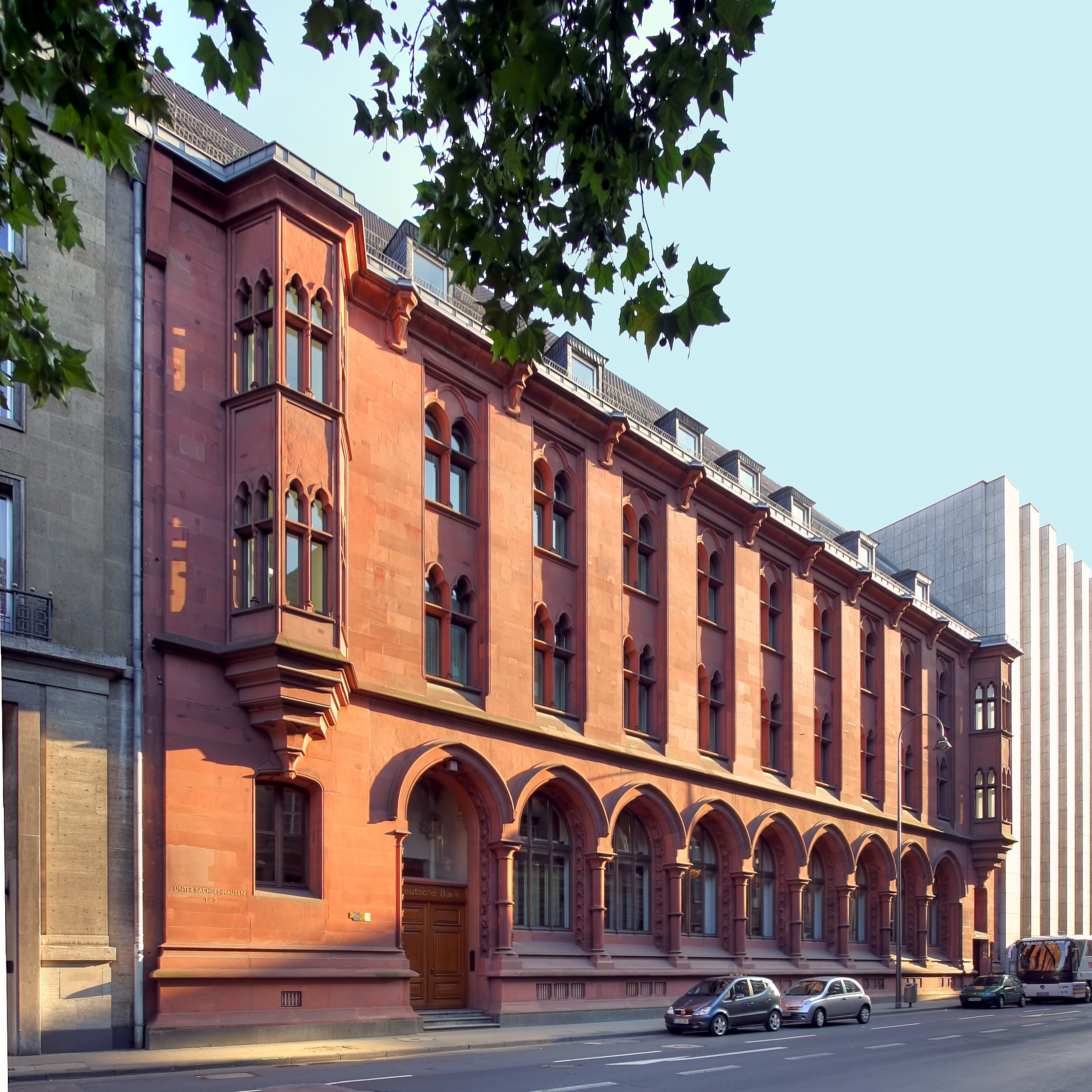
The same building in 2009, following damage in World War II

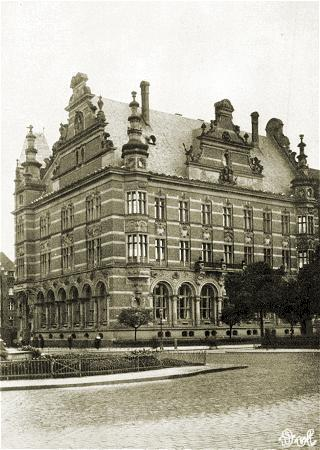
Danzig (now Gdańsk) branch, Karrenwall 10 (arch. Hasak), completed ca. 1904

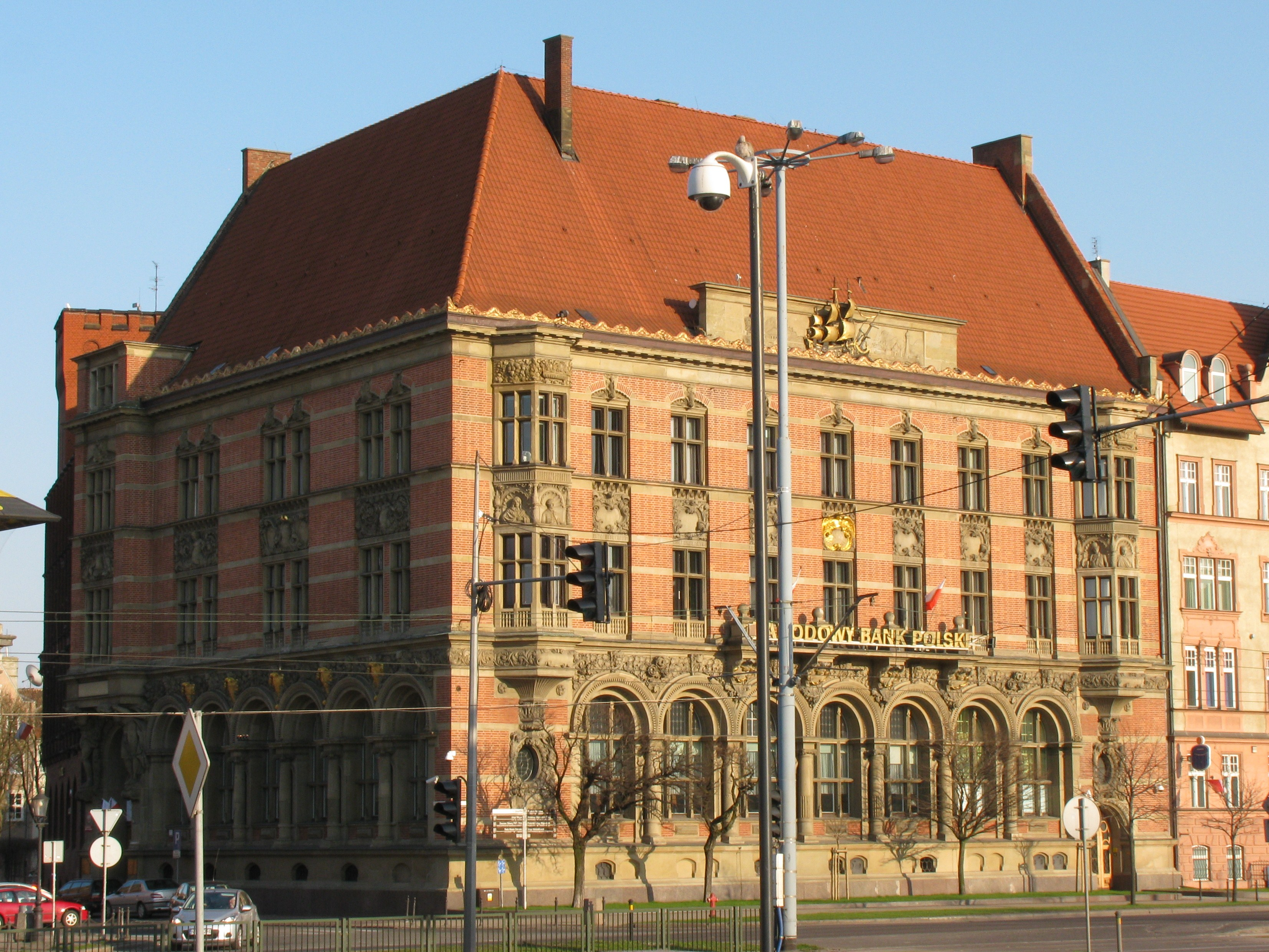
The same building in 2010

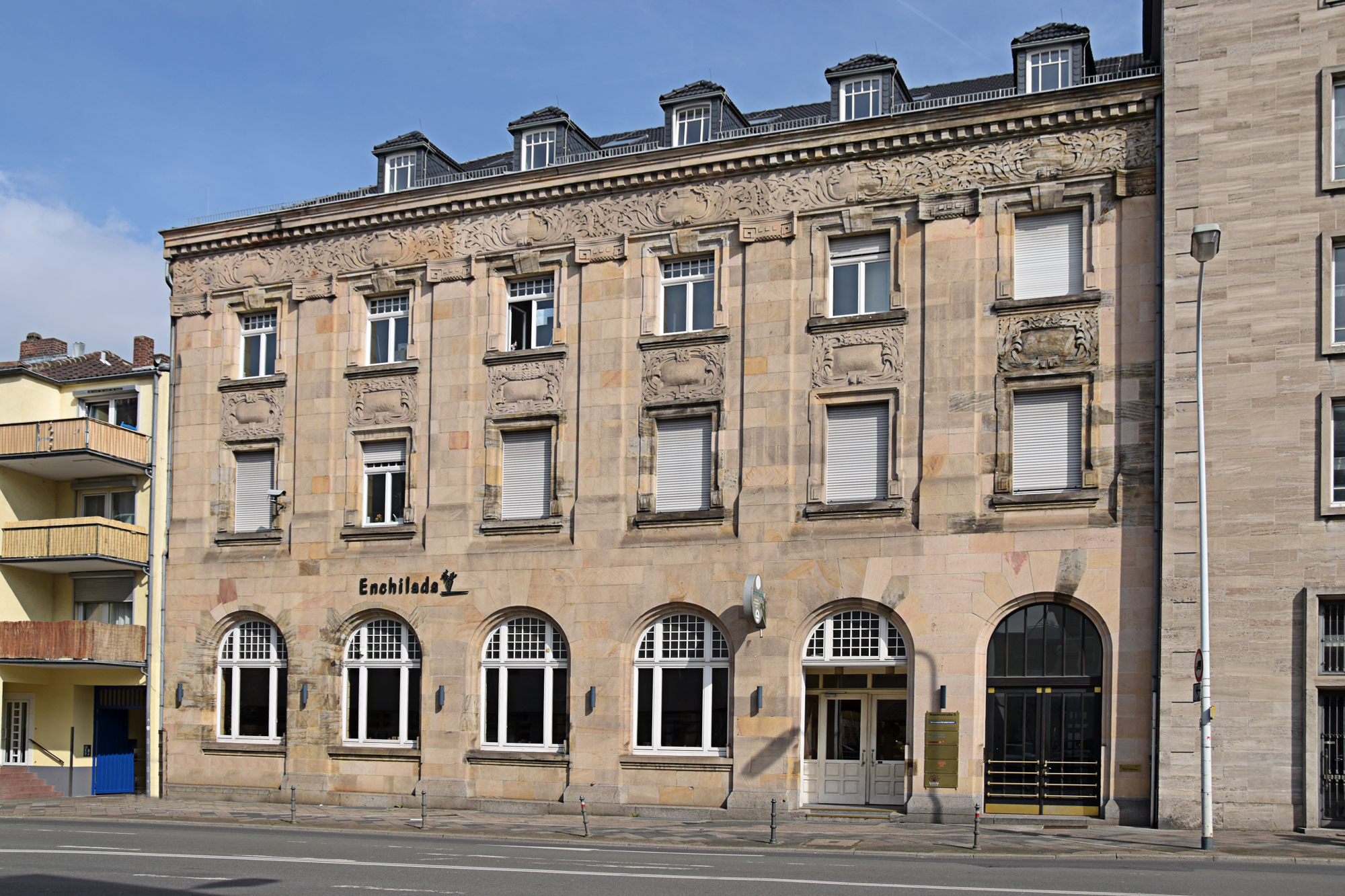
Darmstadt branch, Kasinostraße 5 (arch. Curjel & Moser), completed 1904

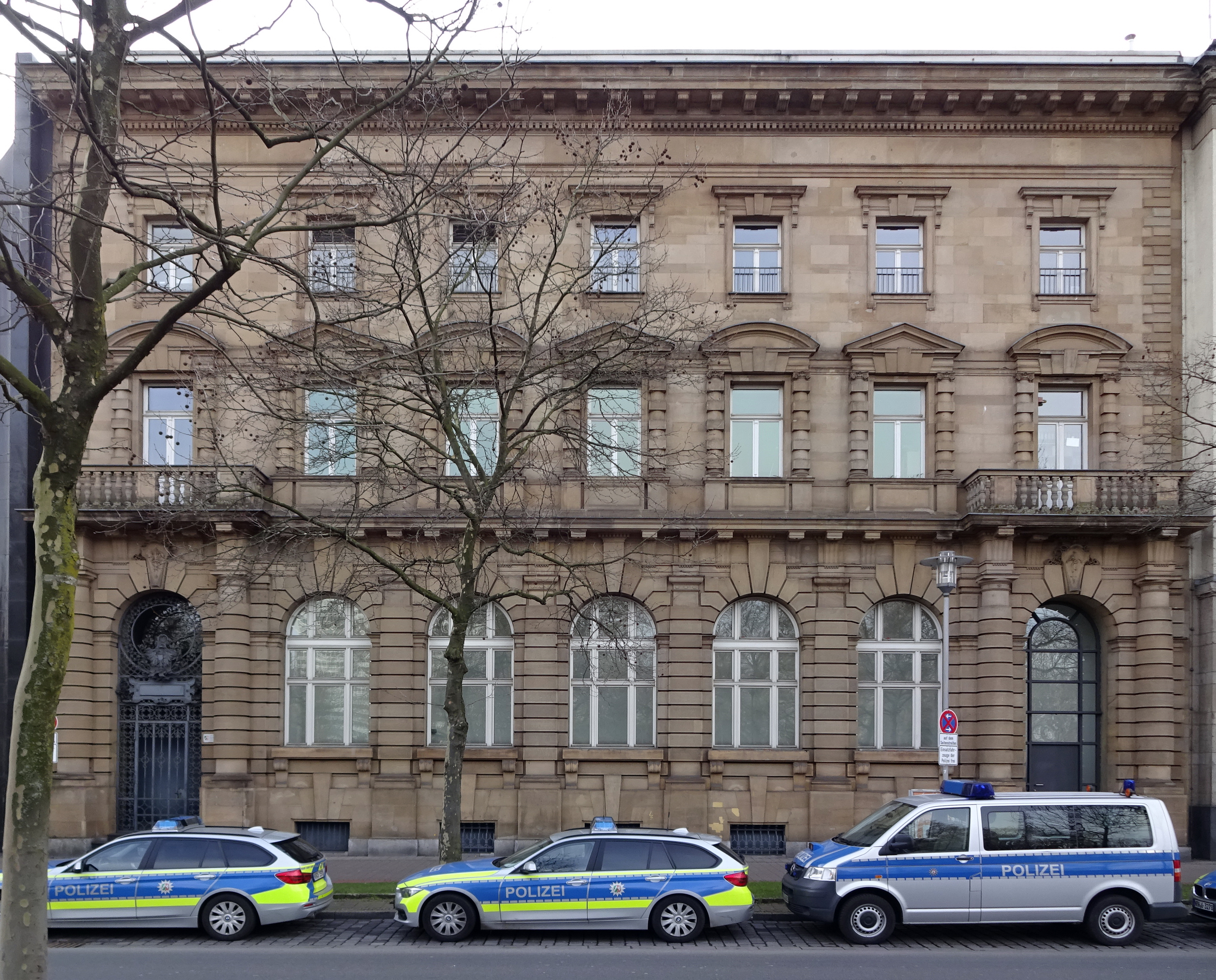
Düsseldorf branch, Heinrich-Heine-Allee 8/9 (arch. Emmerich), completed 1894

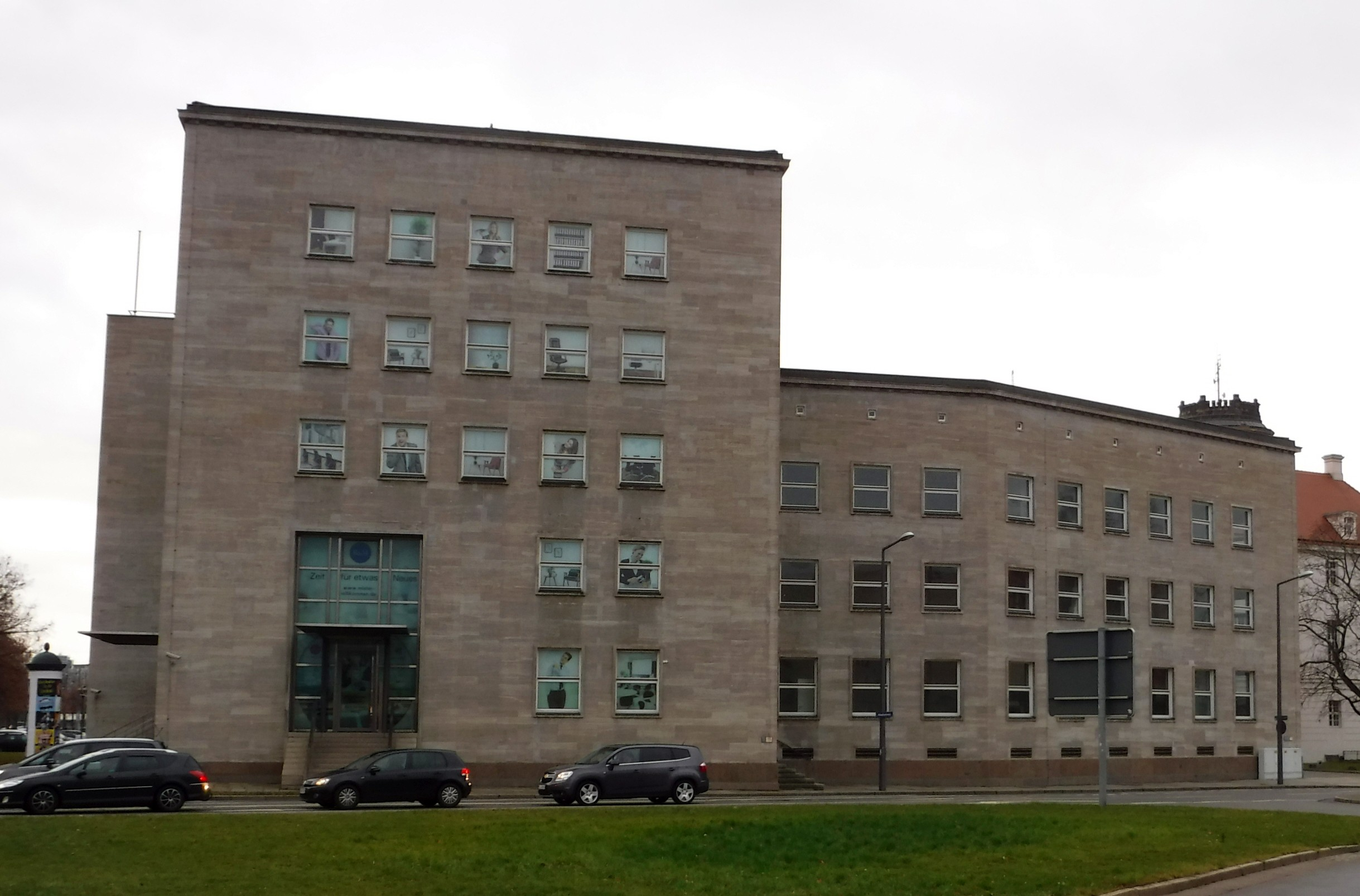
Dresden branch, St. Petersburger Strasse 2 (arch. Wolff), completed 1930

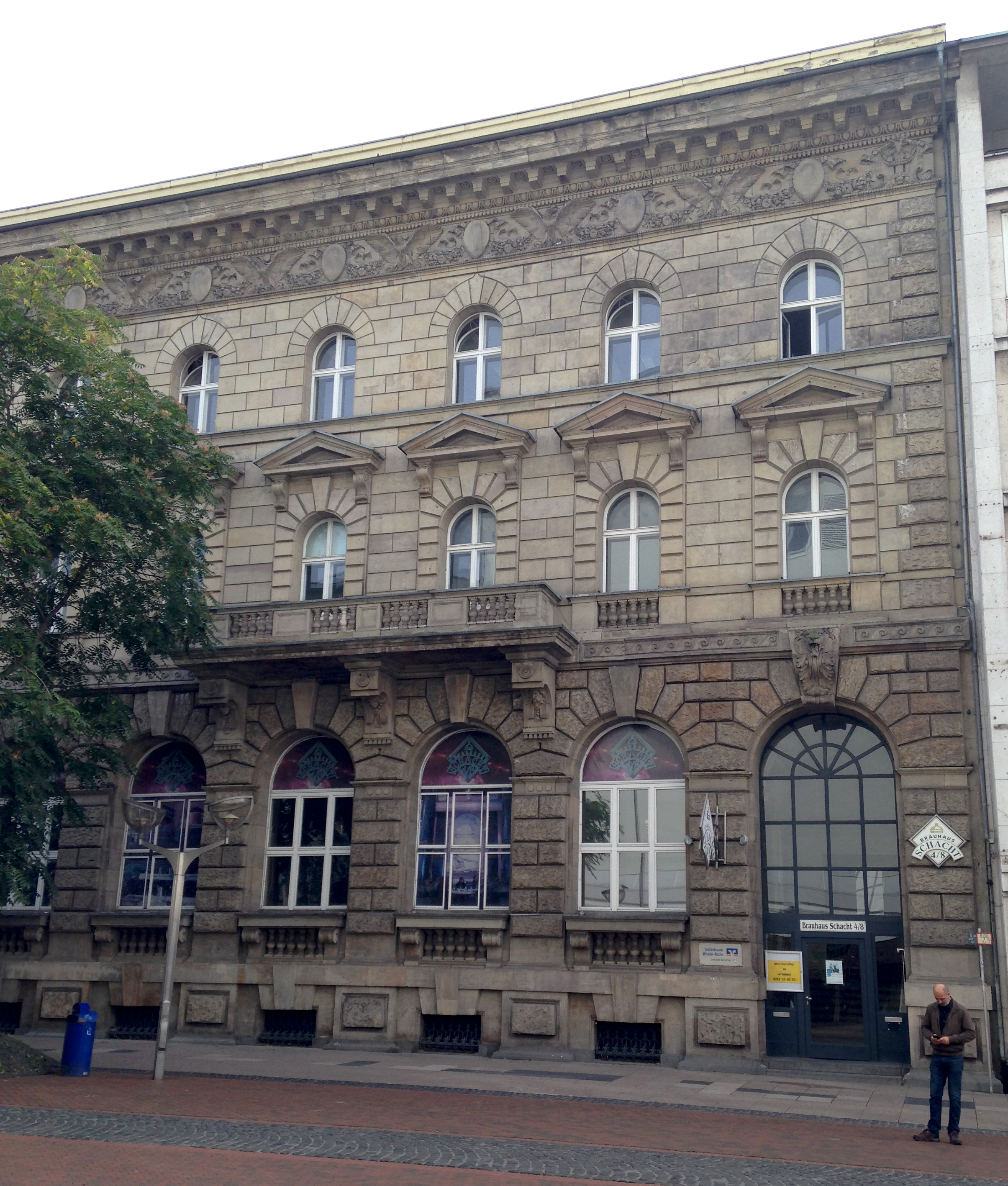
Duisburg branch, Düsseldorfer Strasse 21 (arch. Stiller), completed 1897

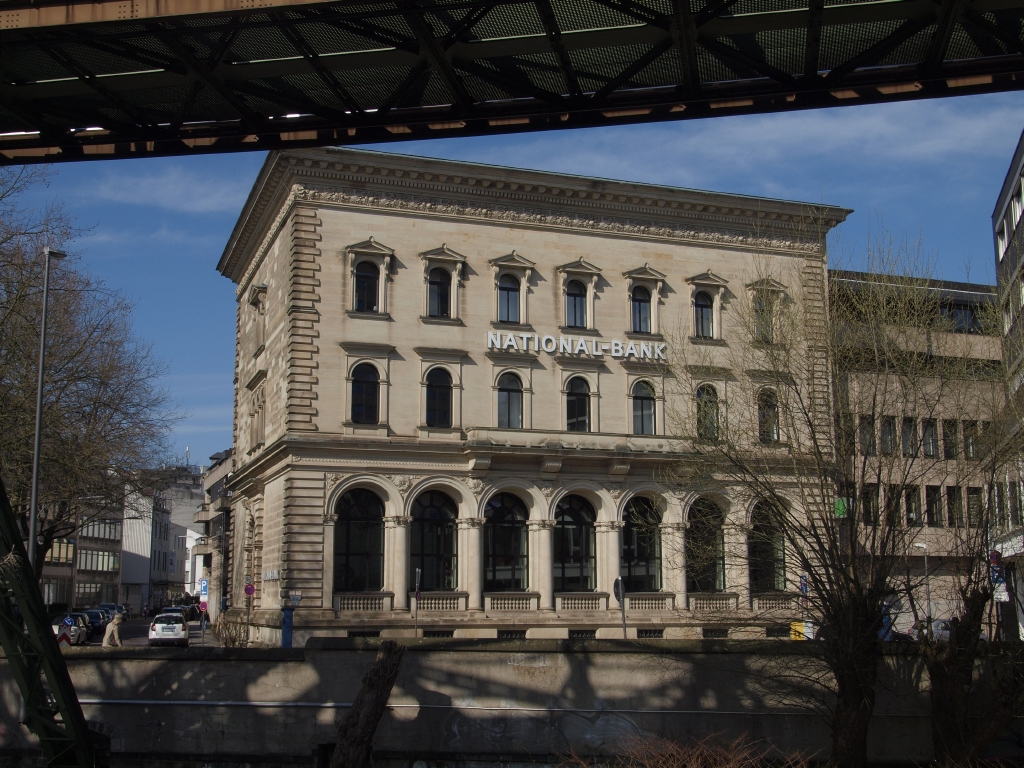
Elberfeld branch, Bankstrasse 23 (arch. Hasak), completed 1892

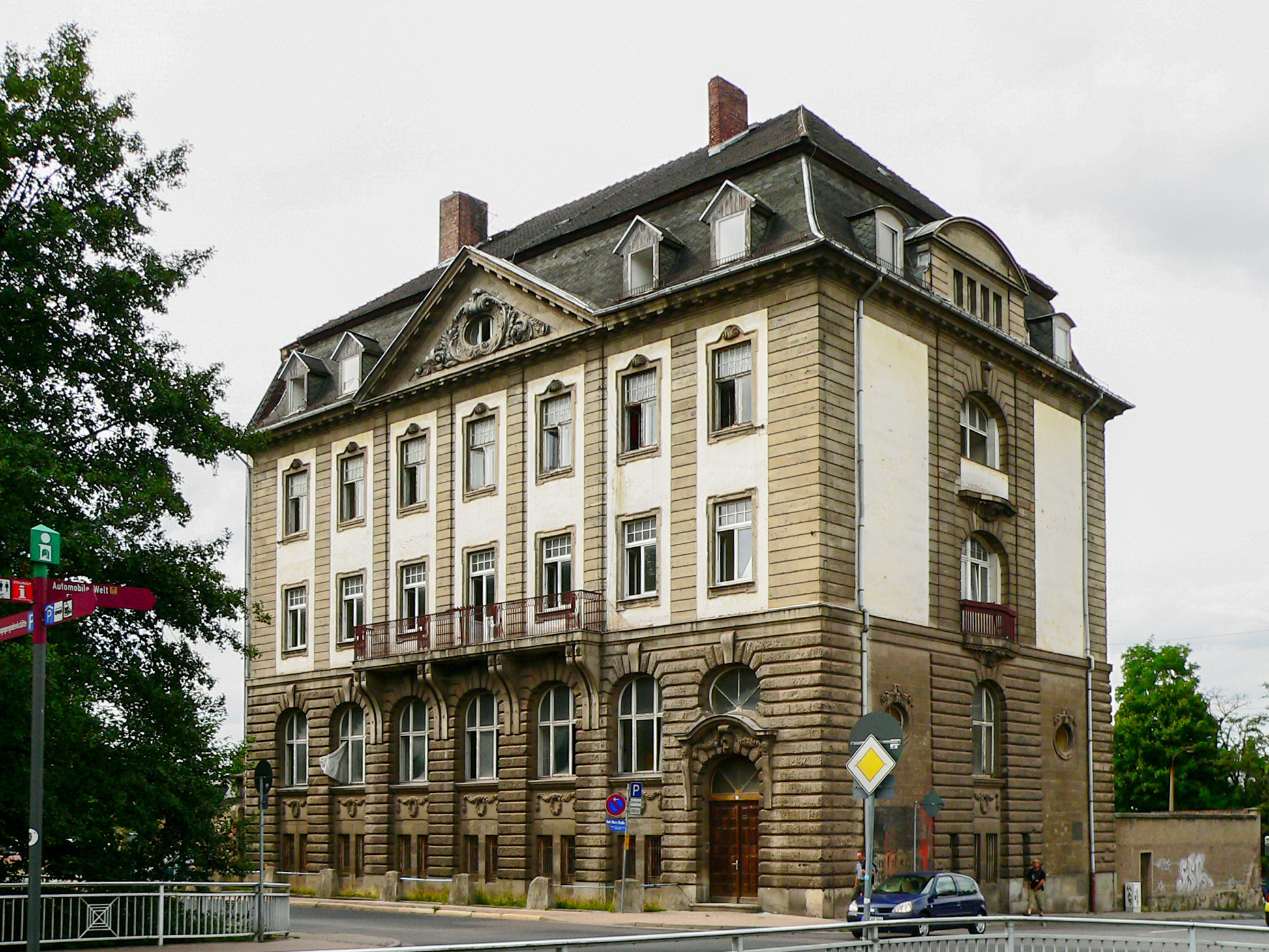
Eisenach branch, Karl-Marx-Straße 53, completed 1905

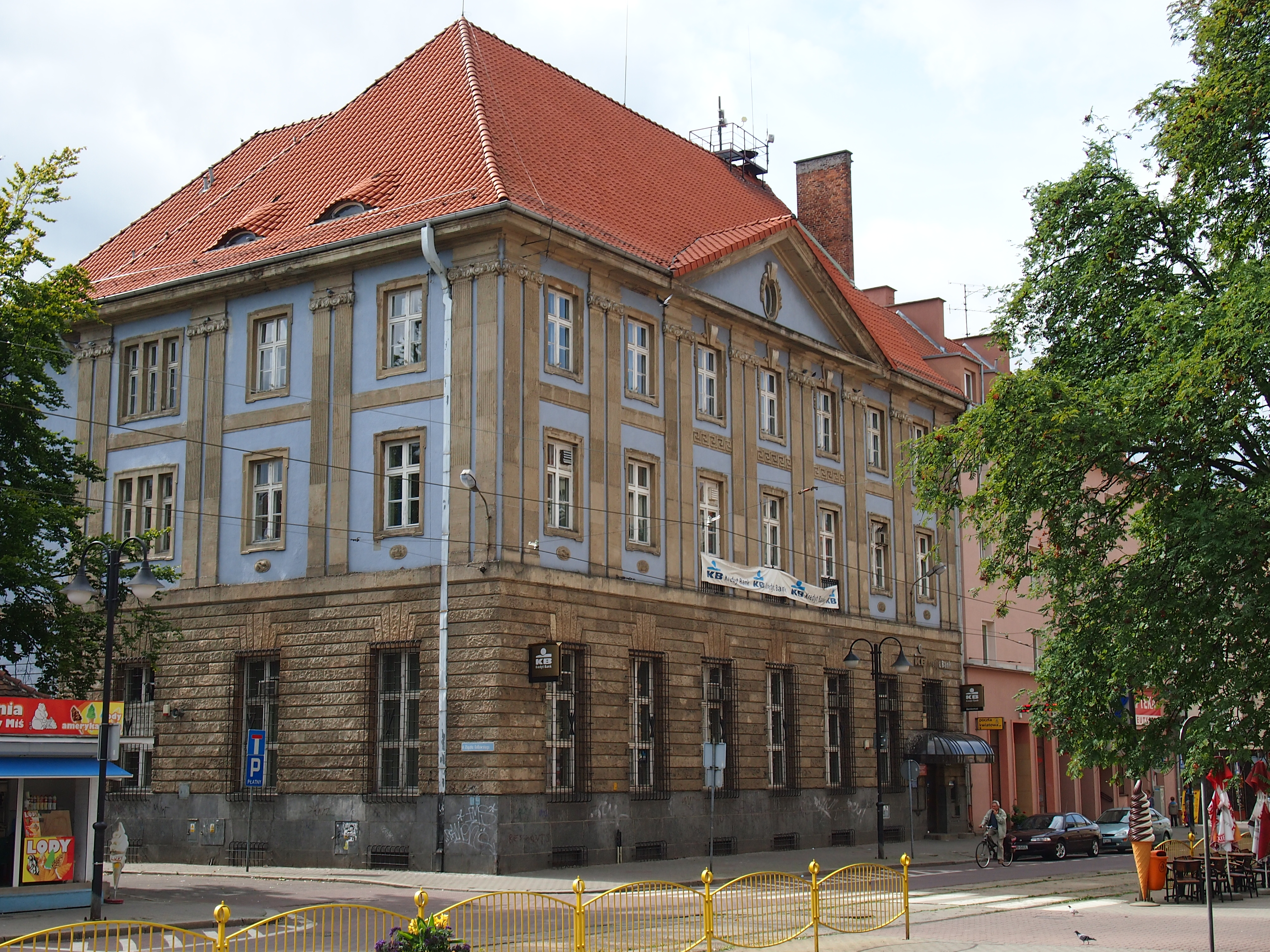
Elbing (now Elbląg) branch, ulica 1 Maja 16 (arch. Habicht), completed 1910

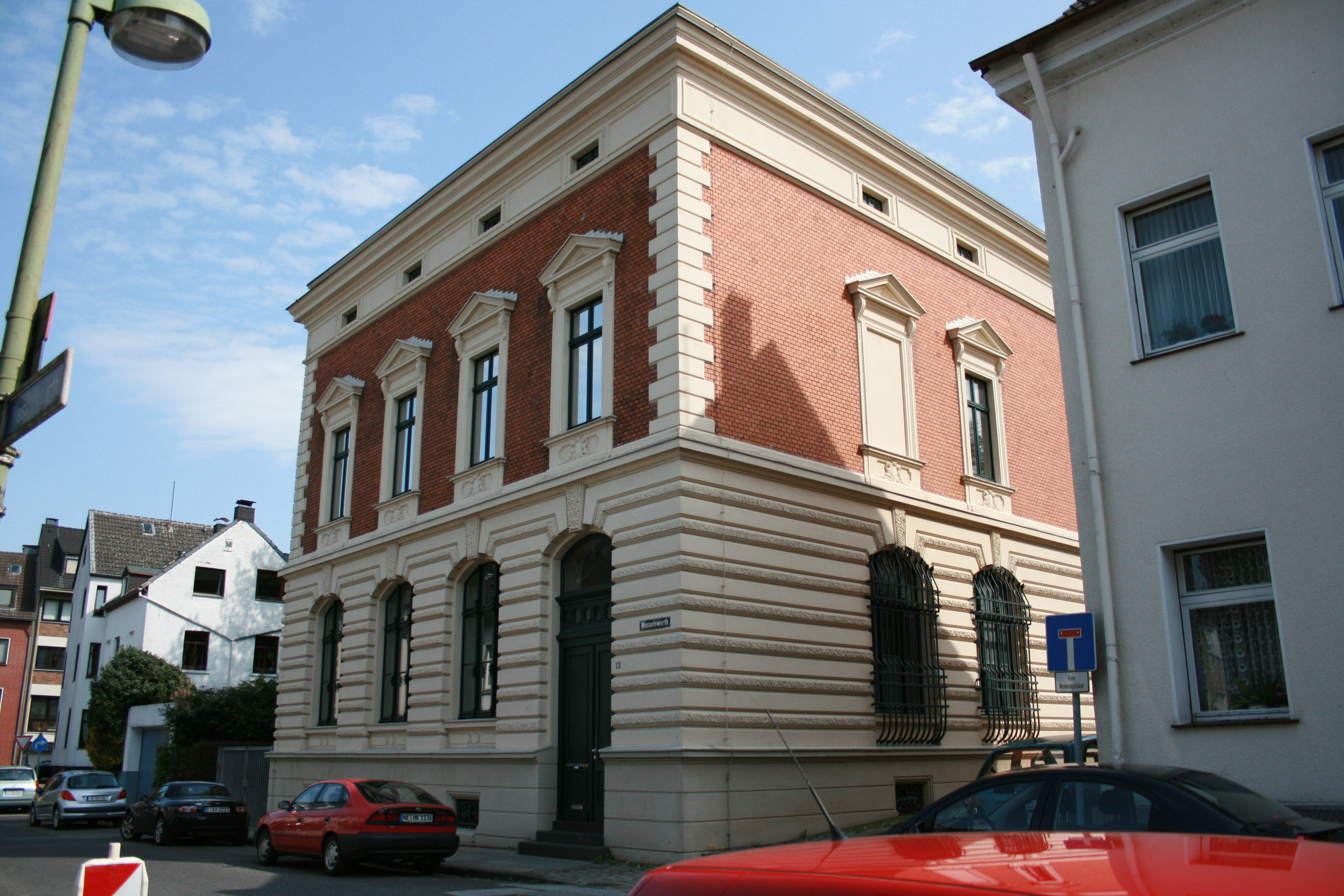
Werden, Essen branch, Wesselswerth 9, completed 1902

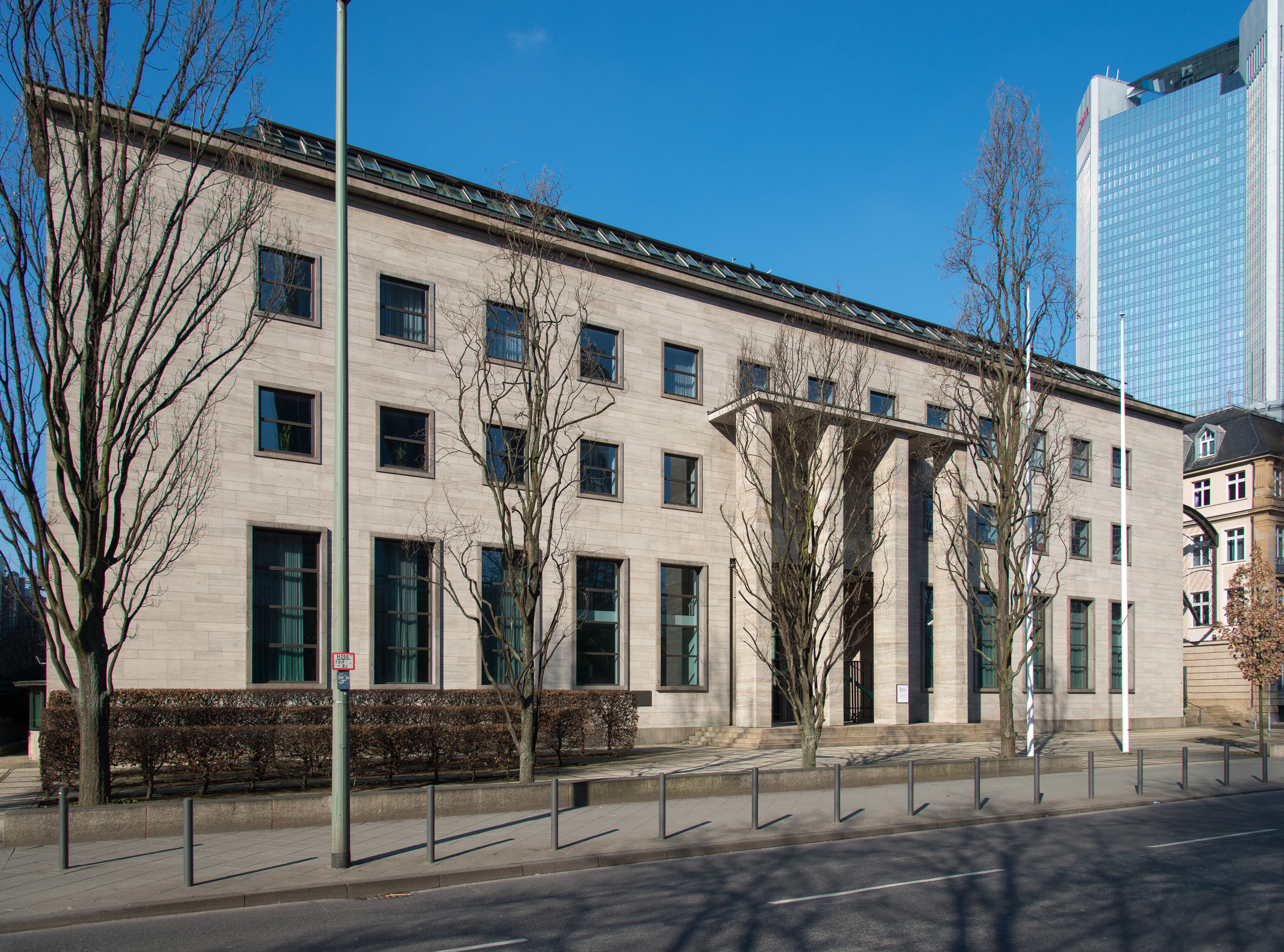
Frankfurt branch, Taunusanlage 4-6 (arch. Amsler & Wolff), completed 1933, renovated in the 1980s

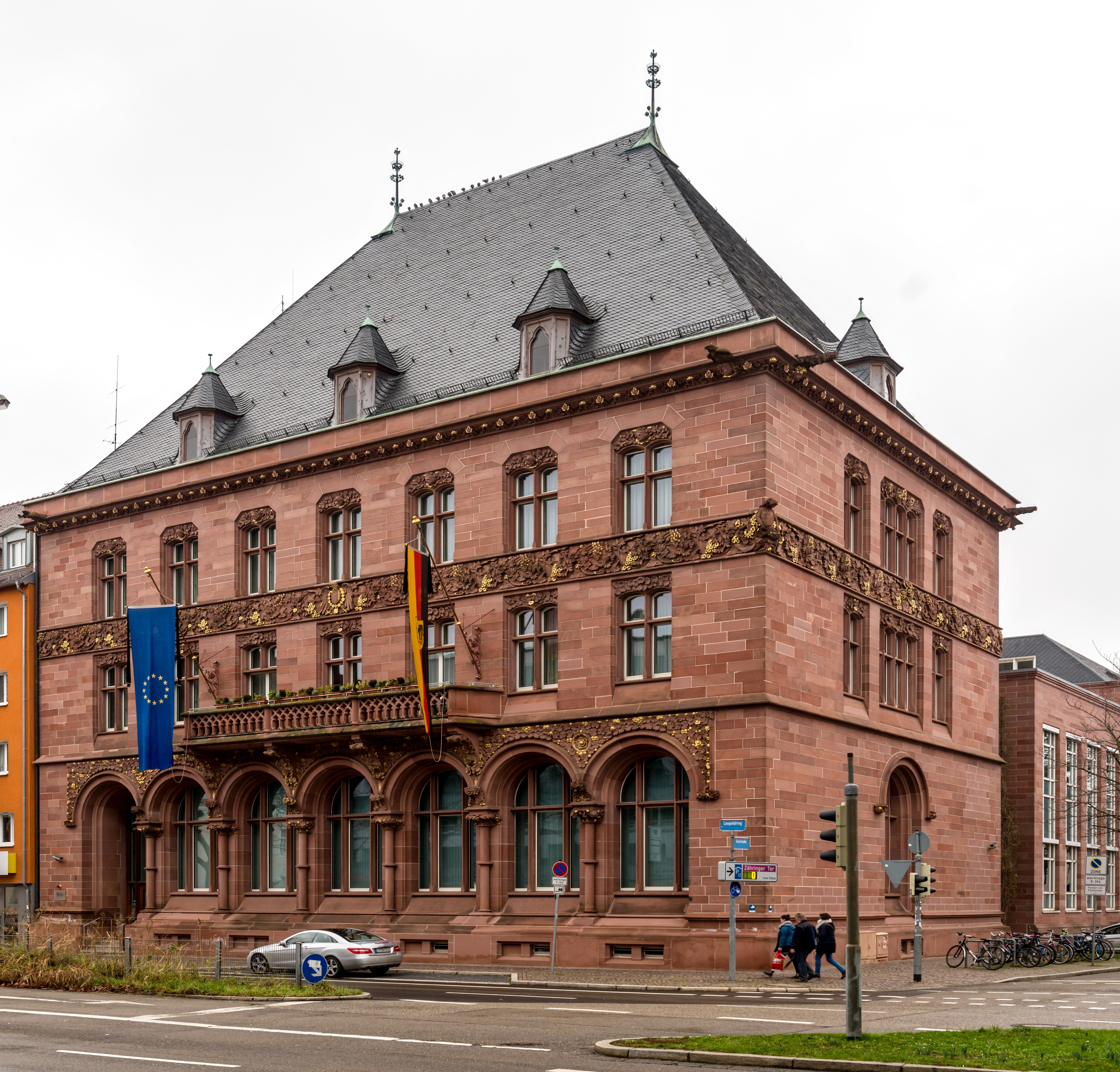
Freiburg im Breisgau branch, Leopoldring 9 (arch. Hasak), completed 1902

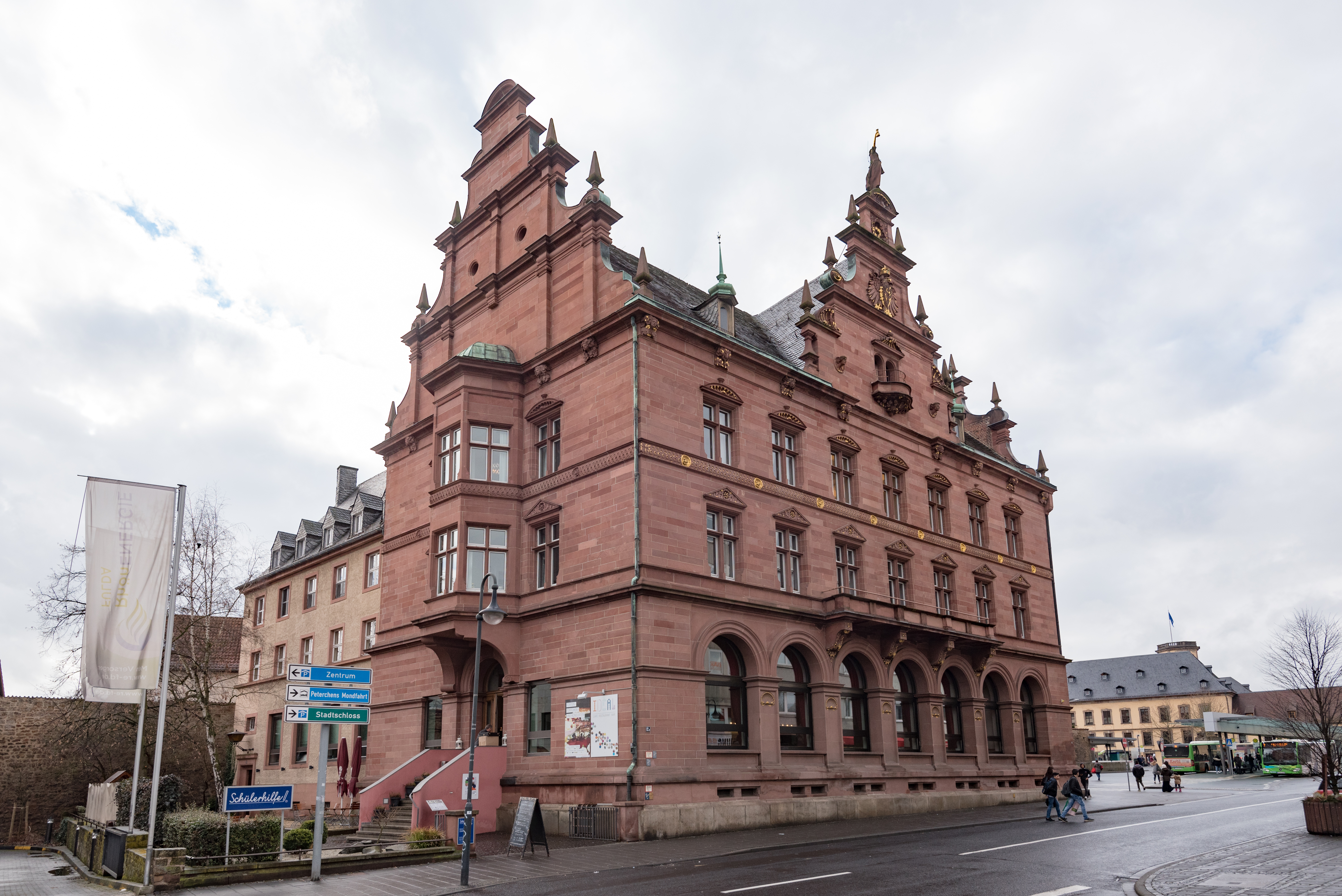
Fulda branch, Rabanusstrasse 12 (arch. Hasak), completed 1902

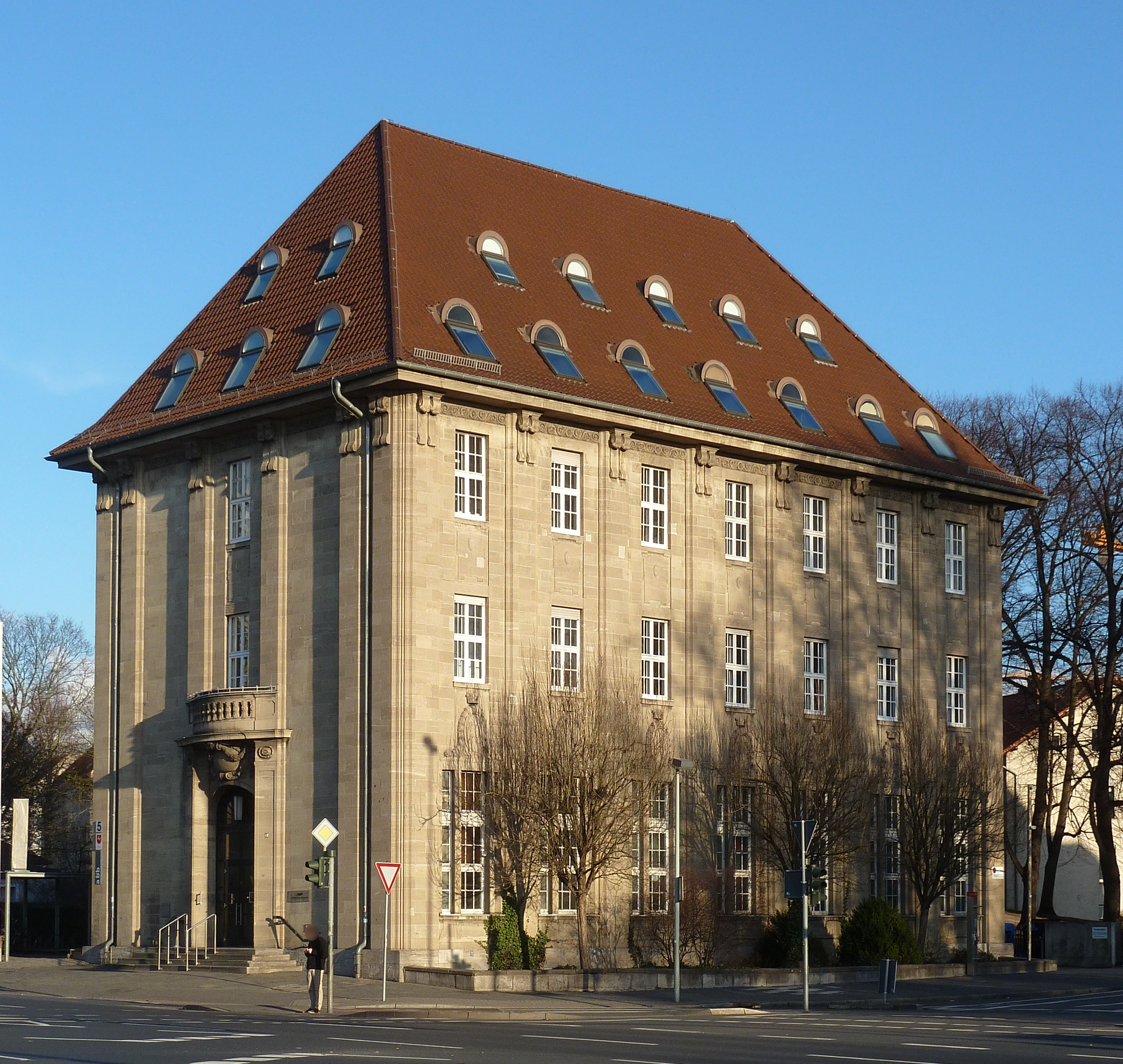
Göttingen branch, Berliner Strasse 5, completed 1909

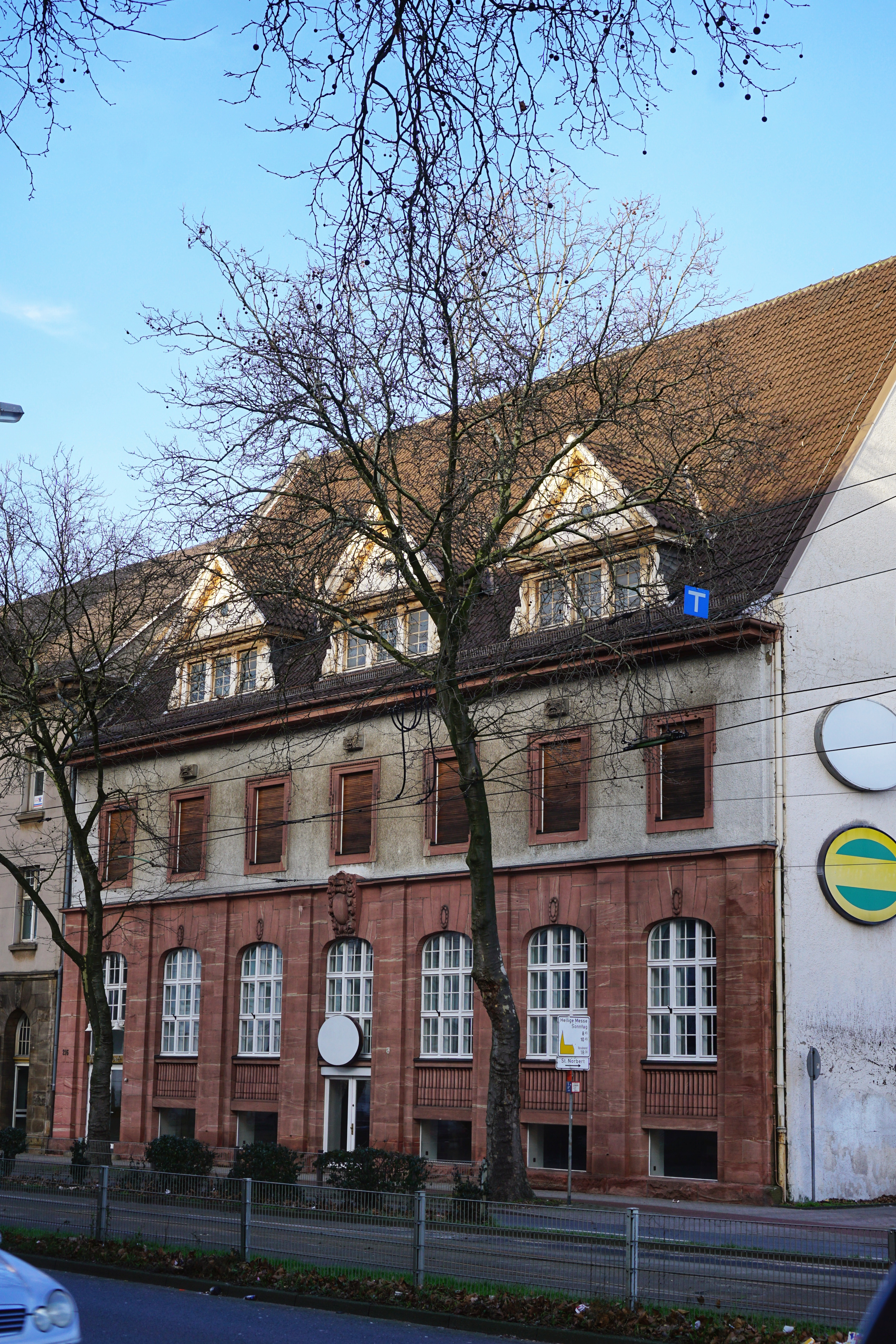
Hamborn (Duisburg) branch, Duisburger Straße 216, completed 1908

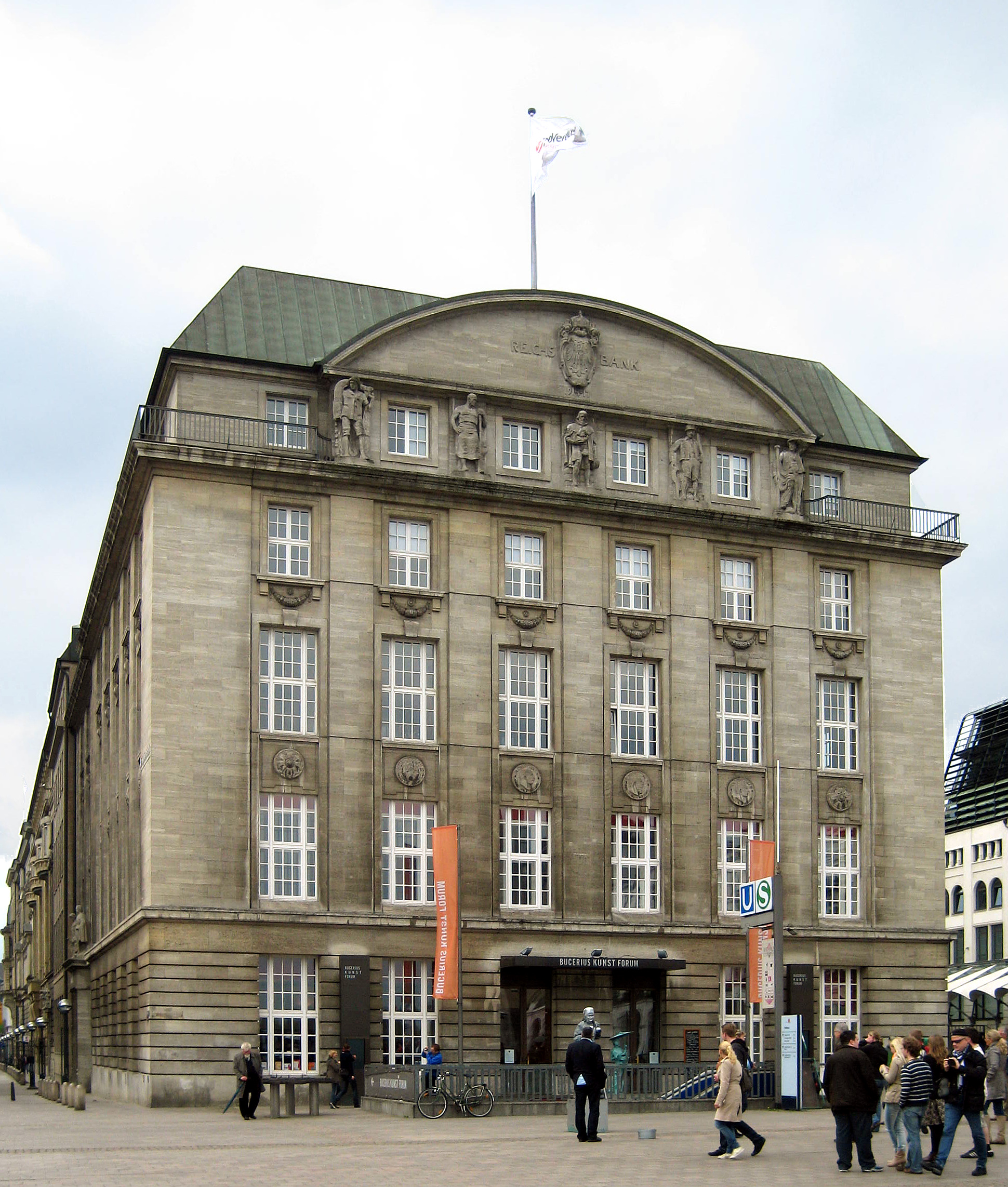
Hamburg branch, Rathausmarkt 2 (arch. Habicht & Nitze), completed 1919

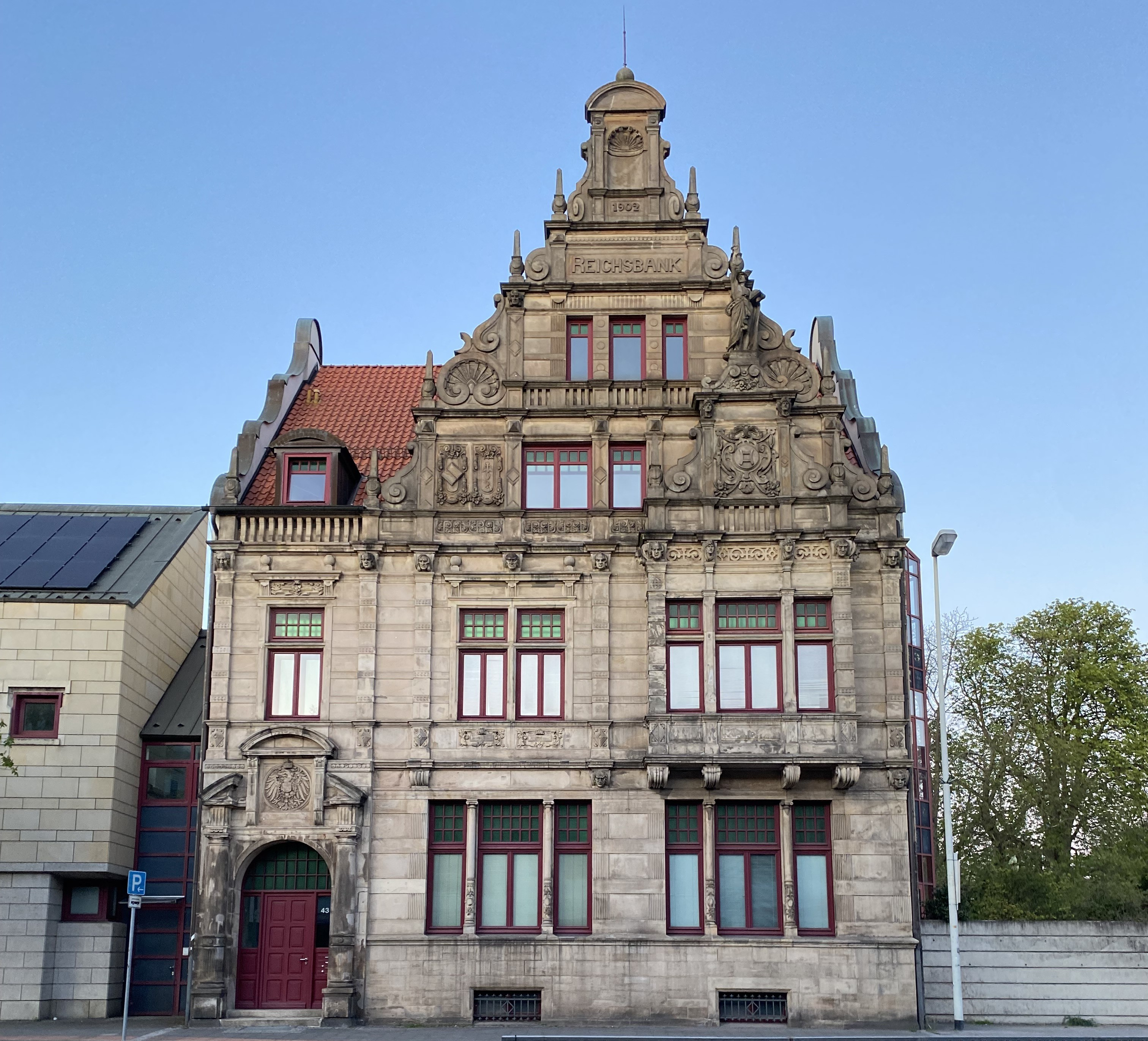
Hamelin branch, Kastanienwall 43, completed 1902

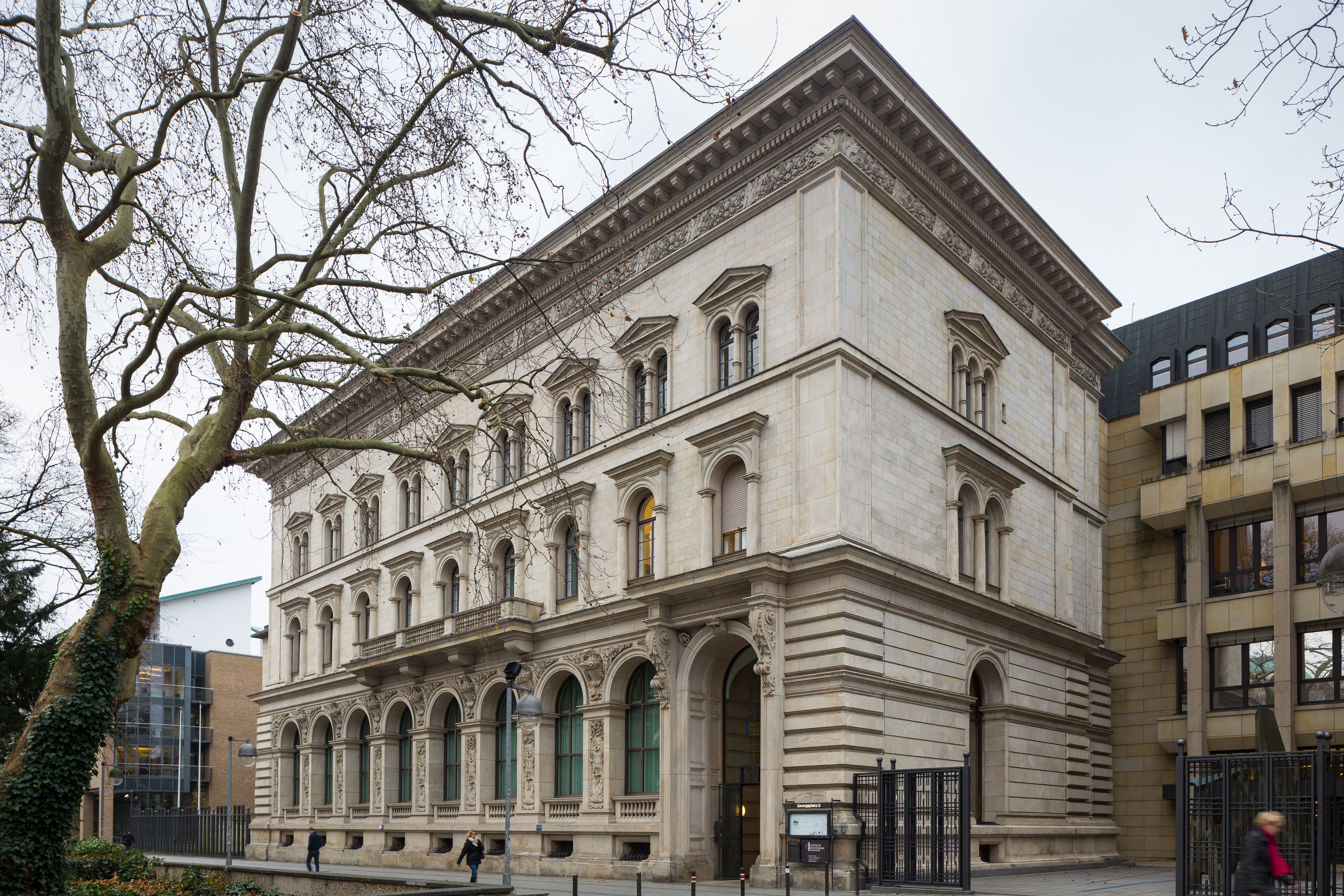
Hanover branch, Georgsplatz 5 (arch. Hasak, Havestadt & Contag), completed 1896

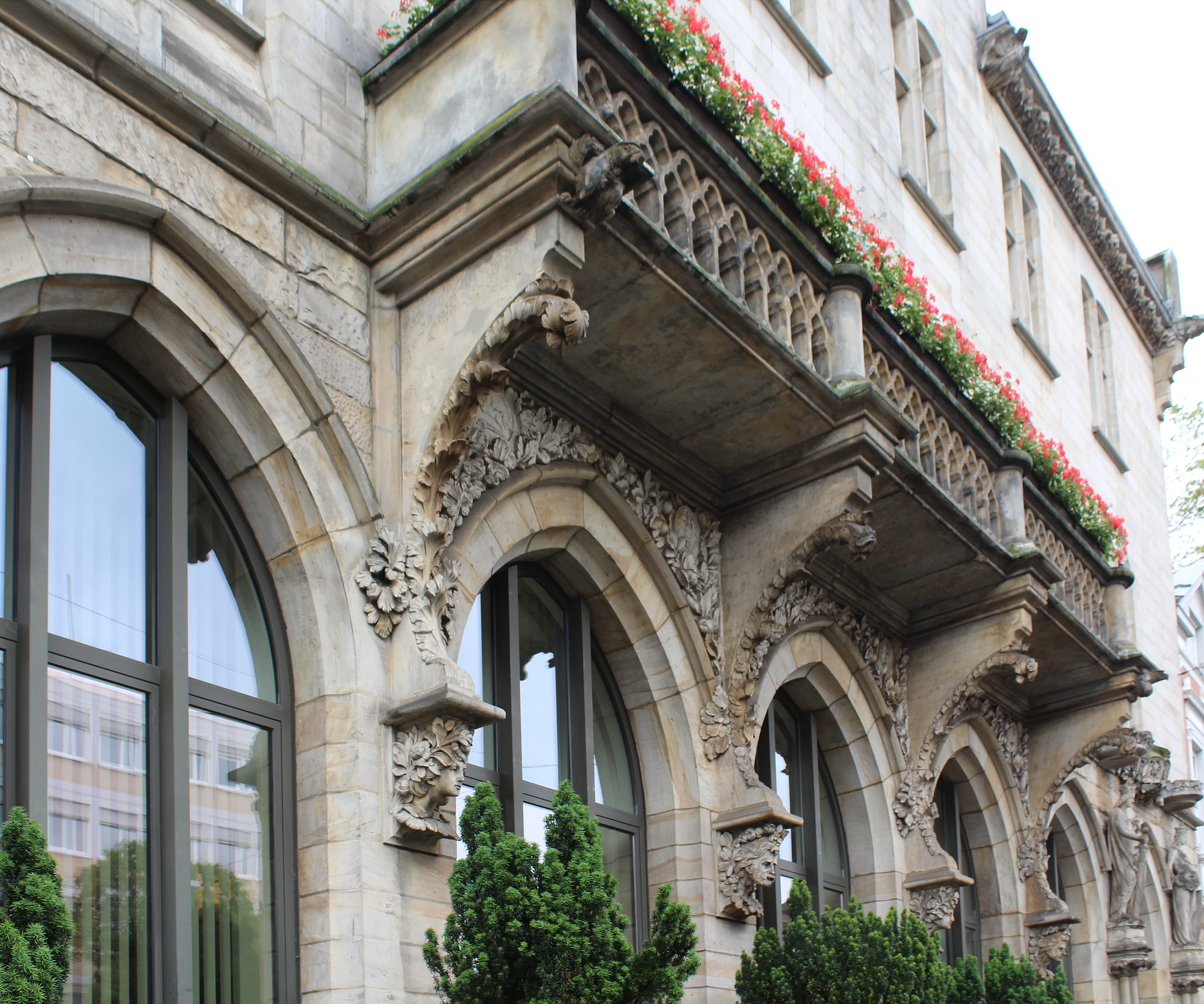
Hildesheim branch, Zingel 34 (arch. Hasak), completed 1897

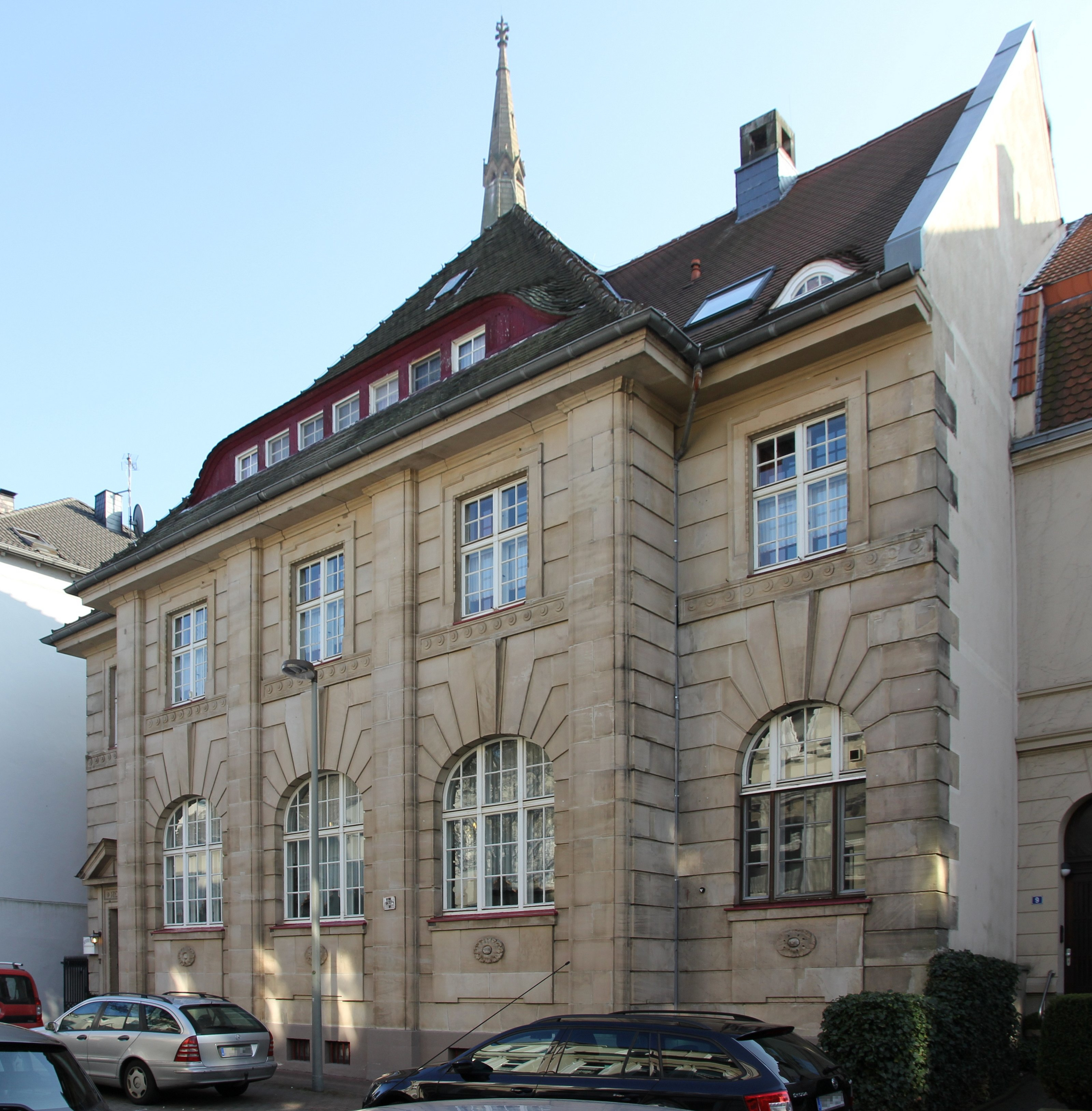
Hörde (Dortmund) branch, Penningskamp 7, completed 1909

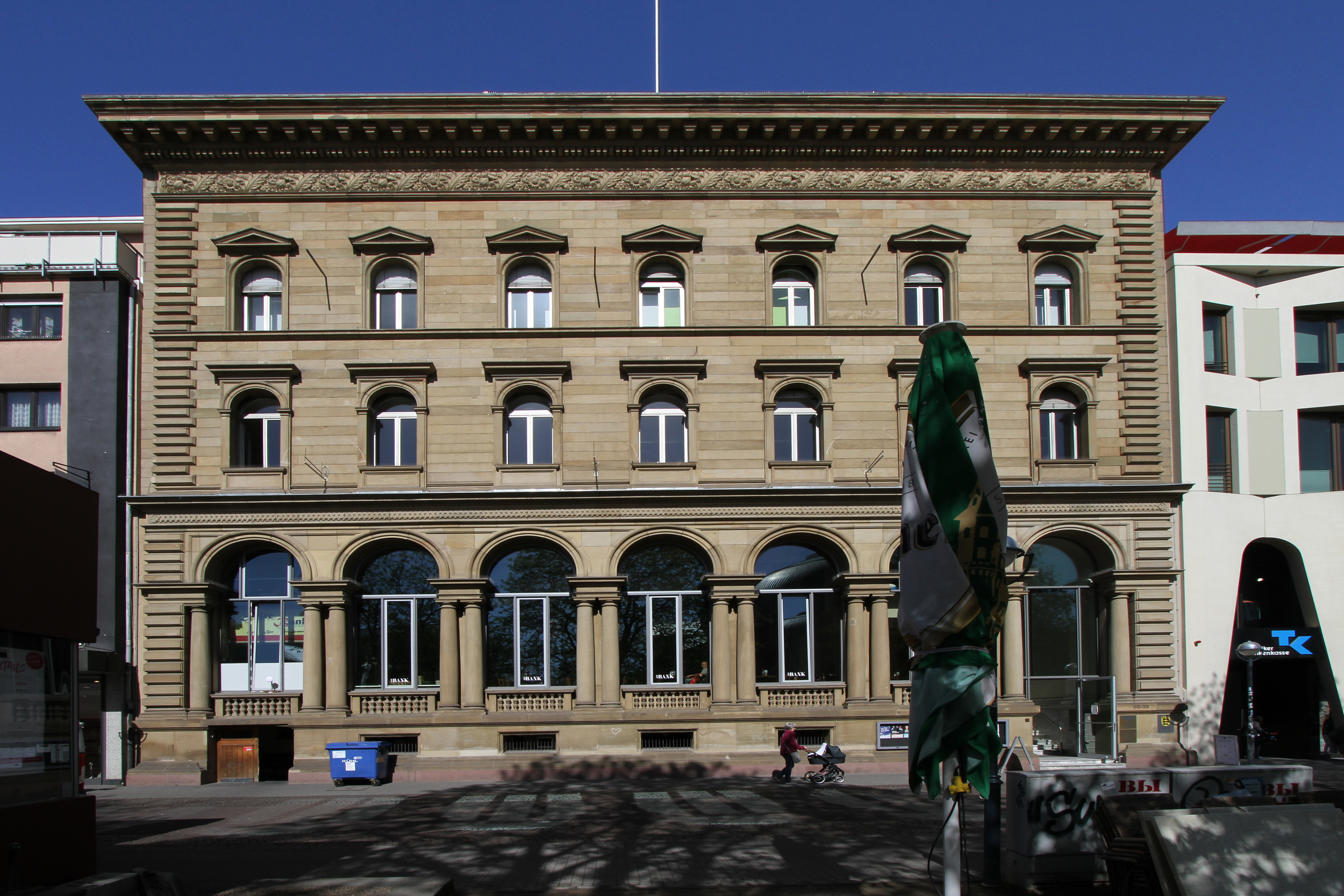
Karlsruhe branch, Herrenstrasse 30 (arch. Hasak, Havestadt & Contag), completed 1893

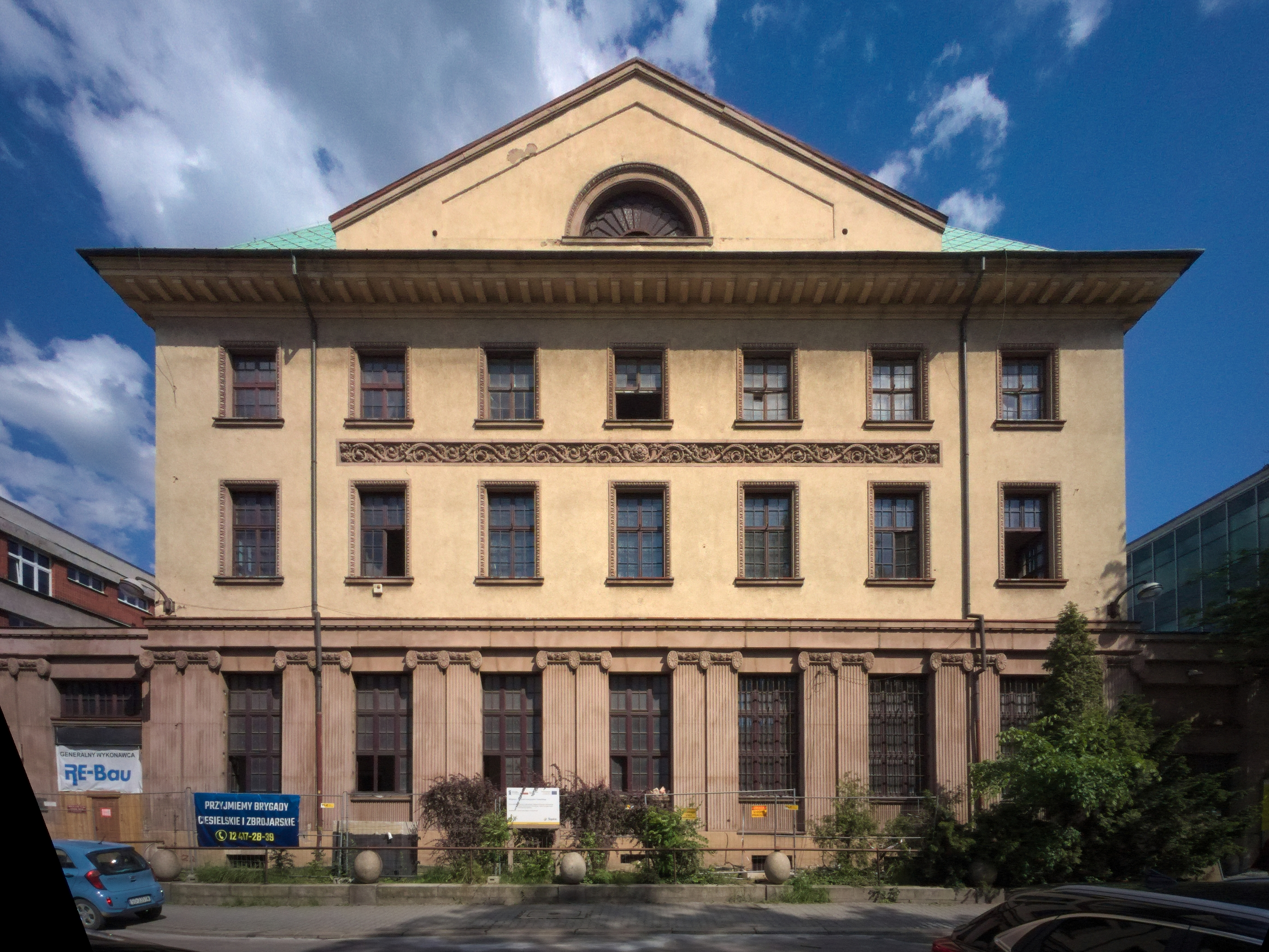
Kattowitz (now Katowice) branch, Bankowa 5 (arch. Habicht), completed 1911

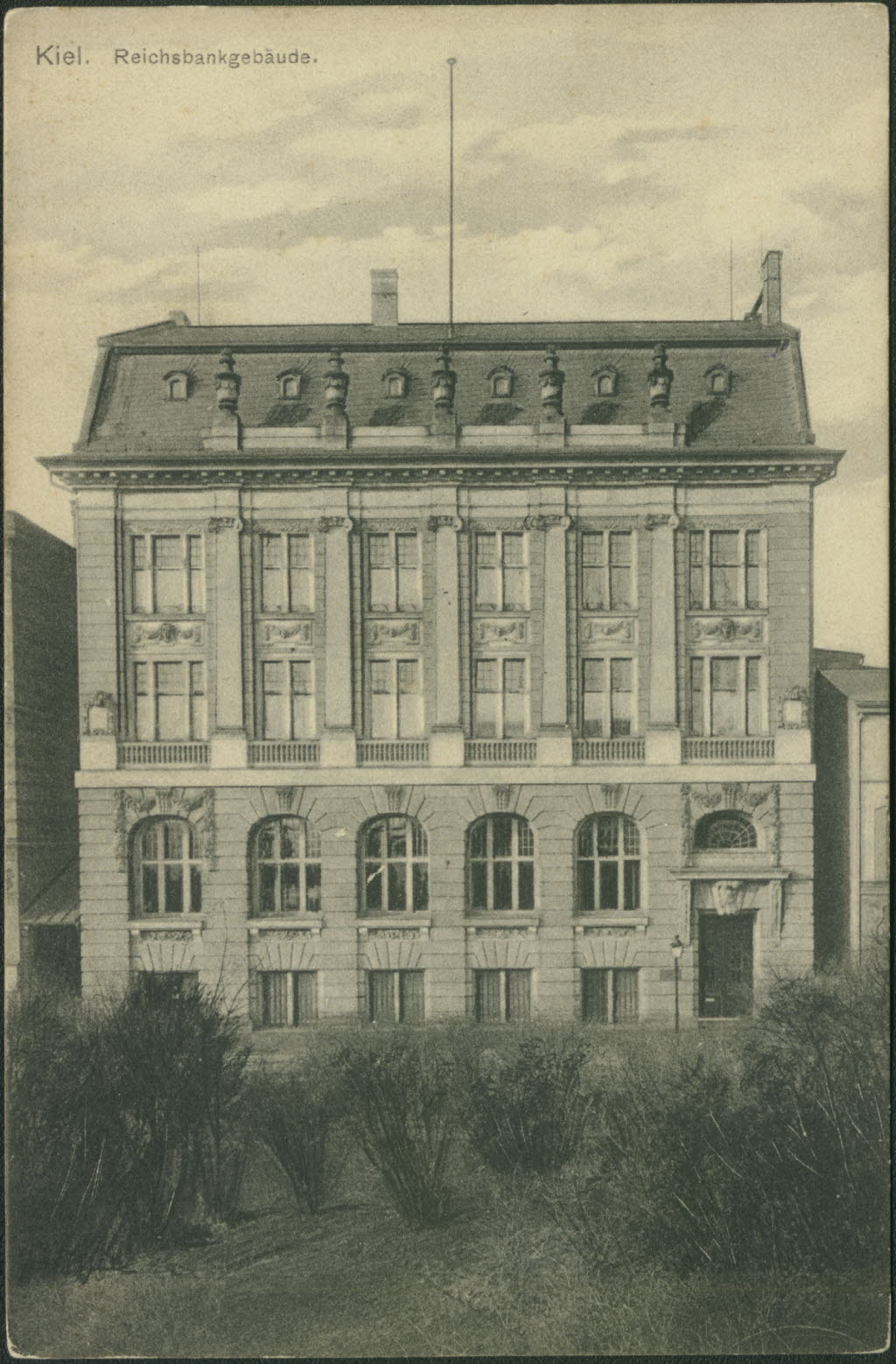
Kiel branch, Fleethörn 29 (early-20th-century photograph)

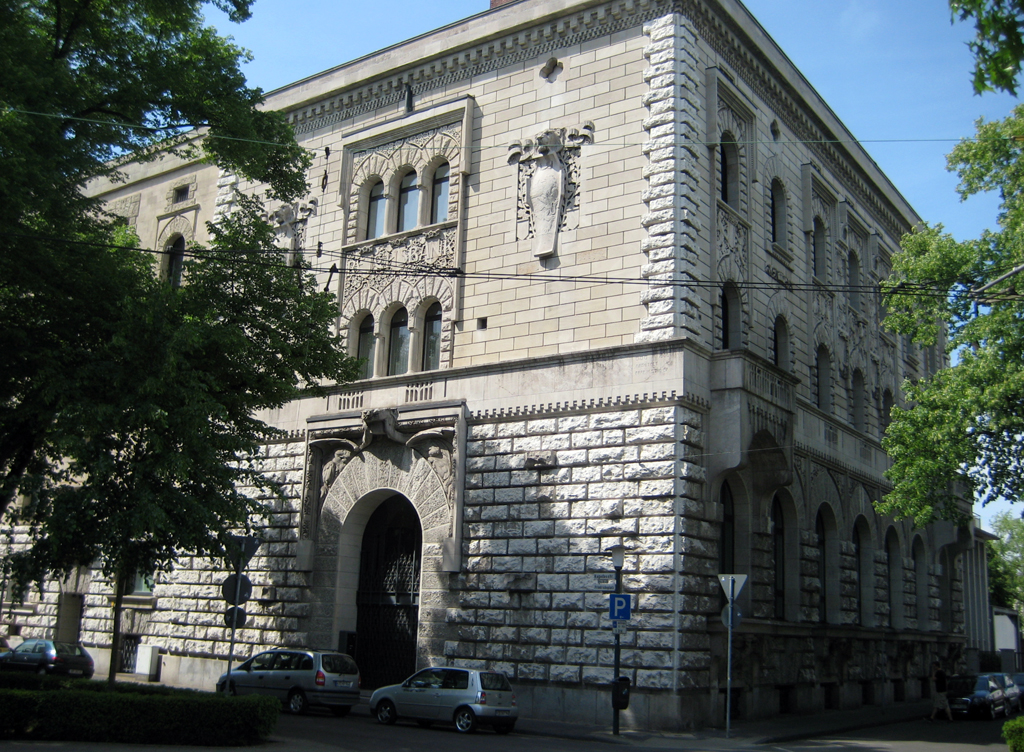
Krefeld branch, Friedrichsplatz 20 (arch. Stiller), completed 1906

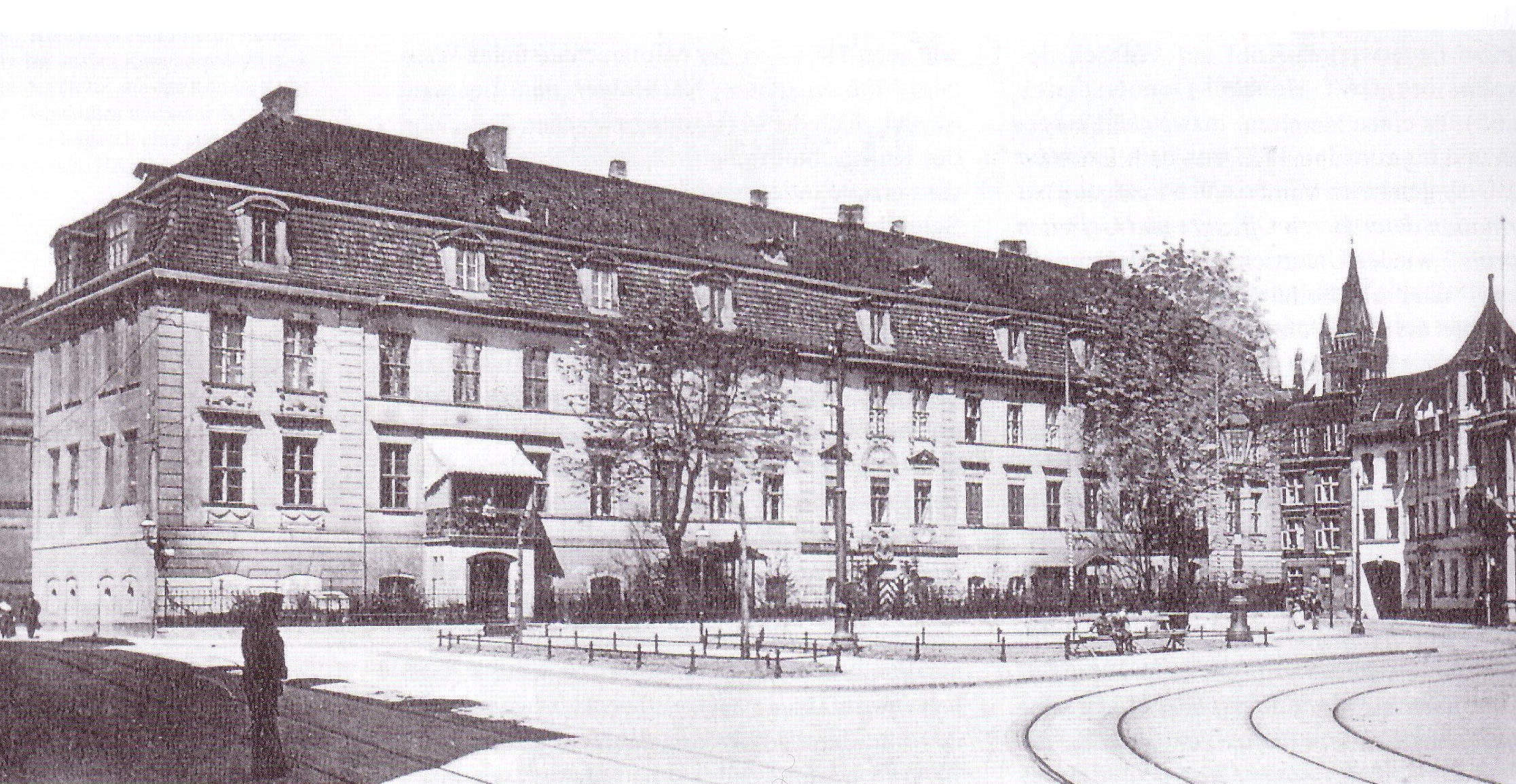
Königsberg (now Kaliningrad) branch, Grosser Domplatz, erected in the late 18th century, destroyed in World War II

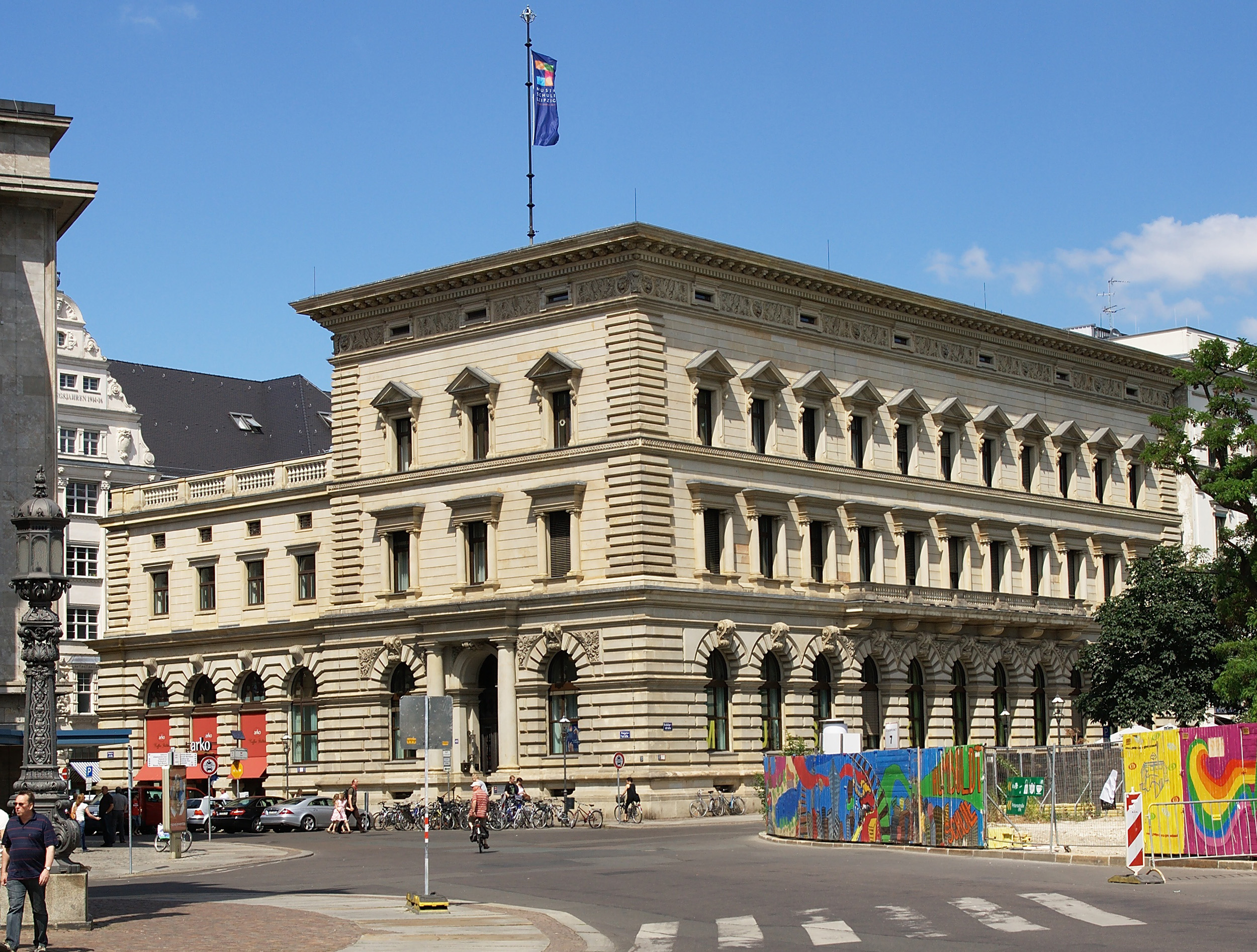
Leipzig branch, Petersstrasse 43 (arch. Hasak), completed 1887

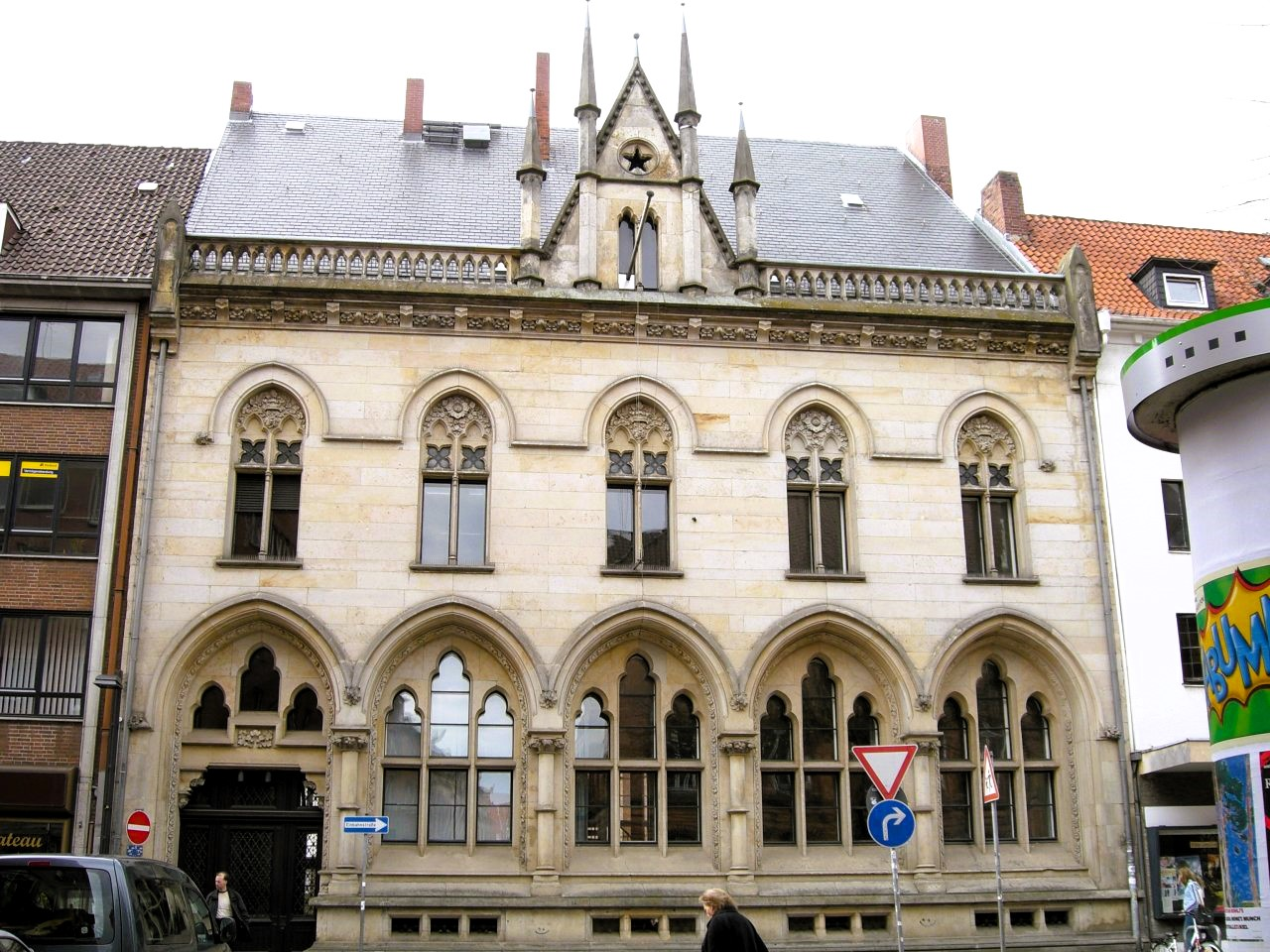
Lübeck branch, Königsstrasse 45 (arch. Hasak), completed 1895

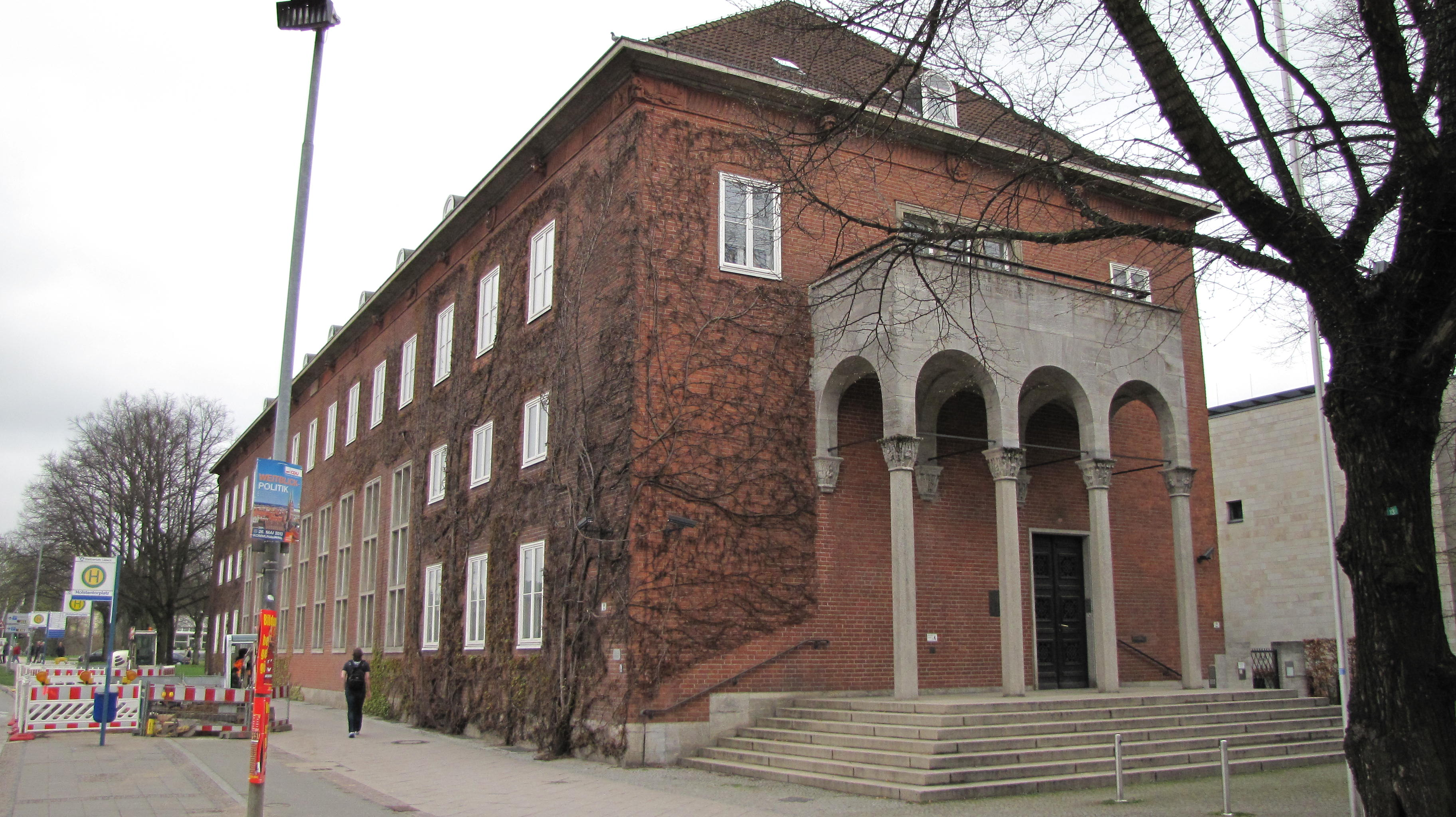
Lübeck new branch, Holstentorplatz 2 (arch. Wolff), completed 1936

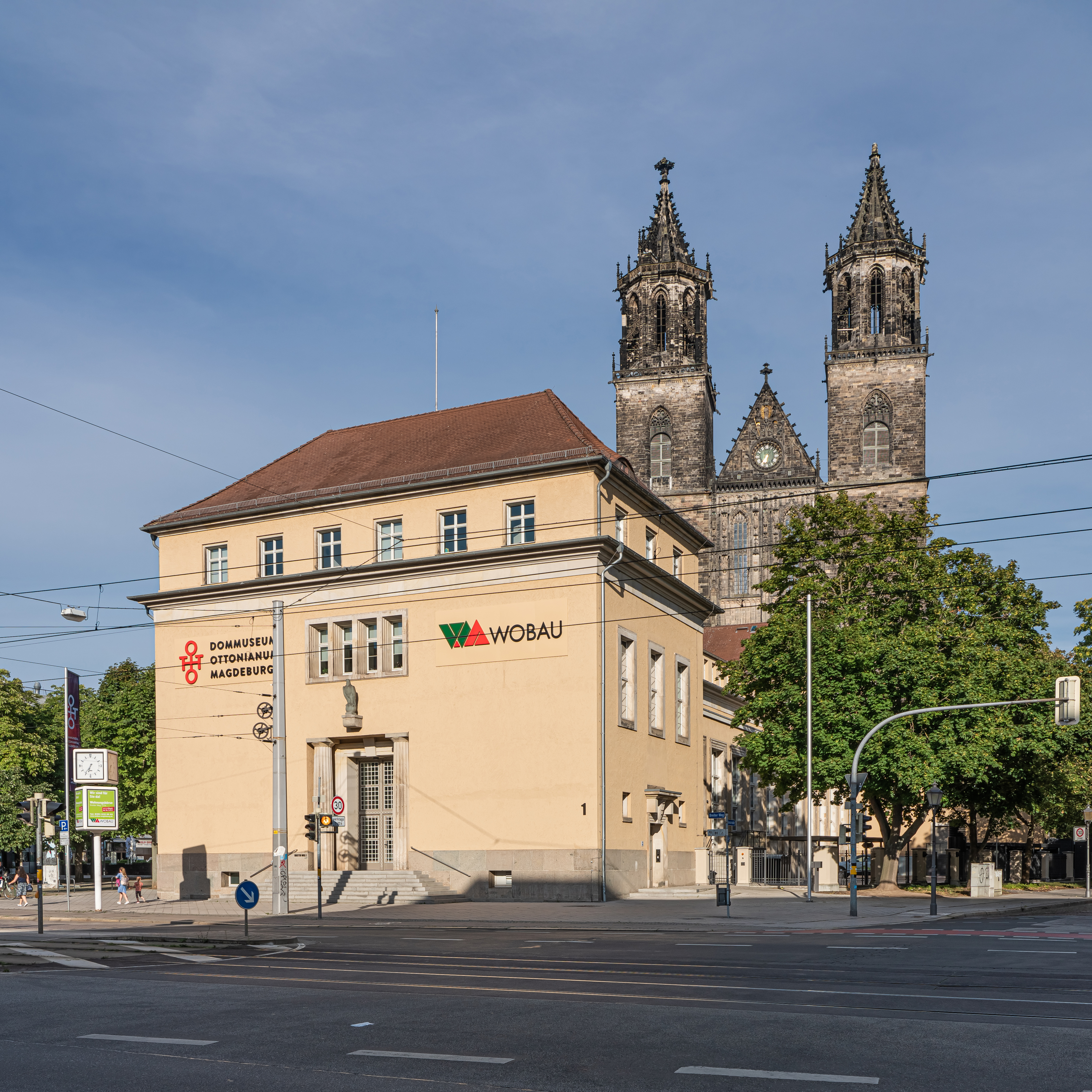
Magdeburg branch, Domplatz 15 (arch. Nitze), completed 1923

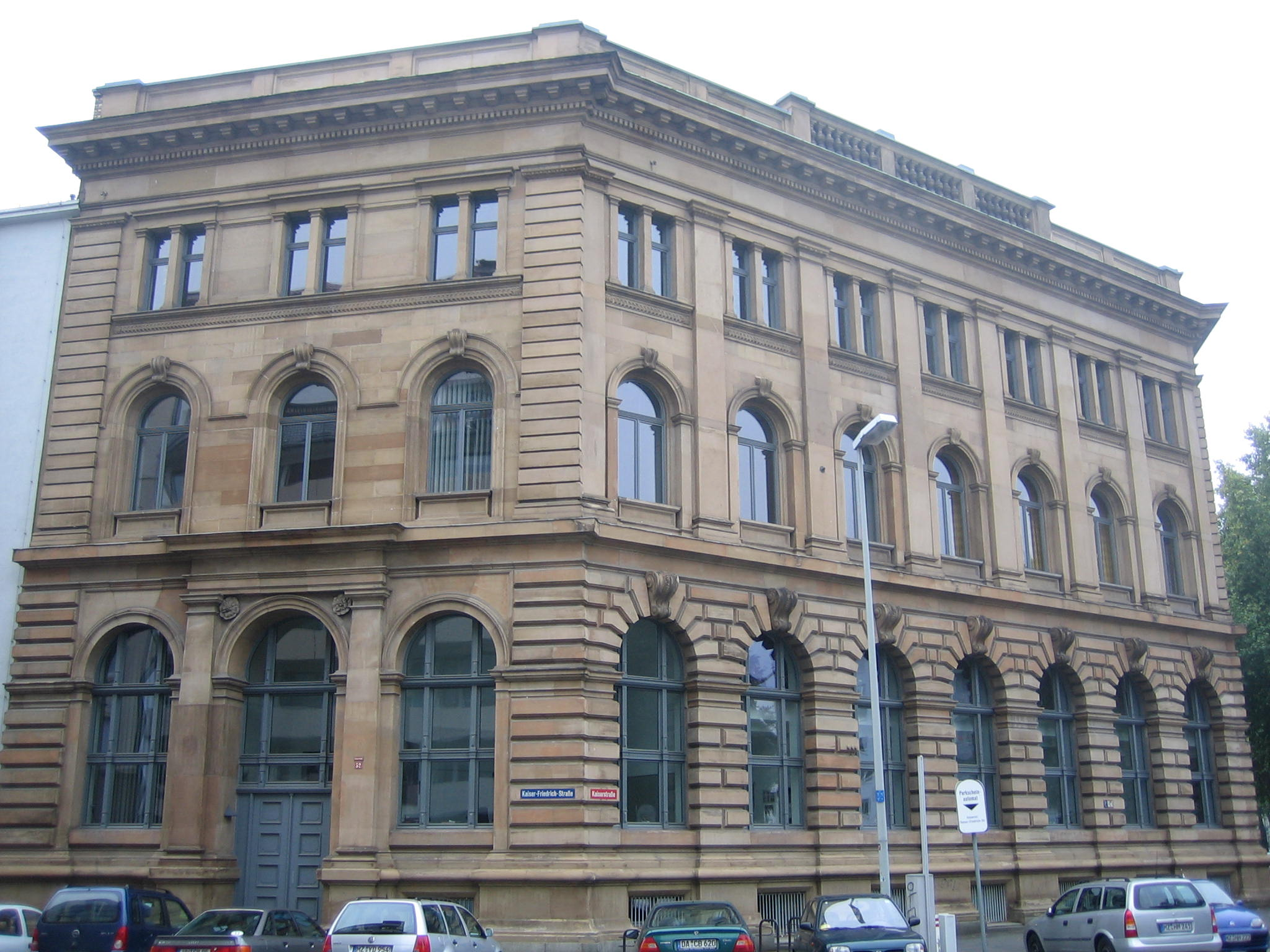
Mainz branch, Kaiserstraße 52 (arch. Hasak, Havestadt & Contag), completed 1892

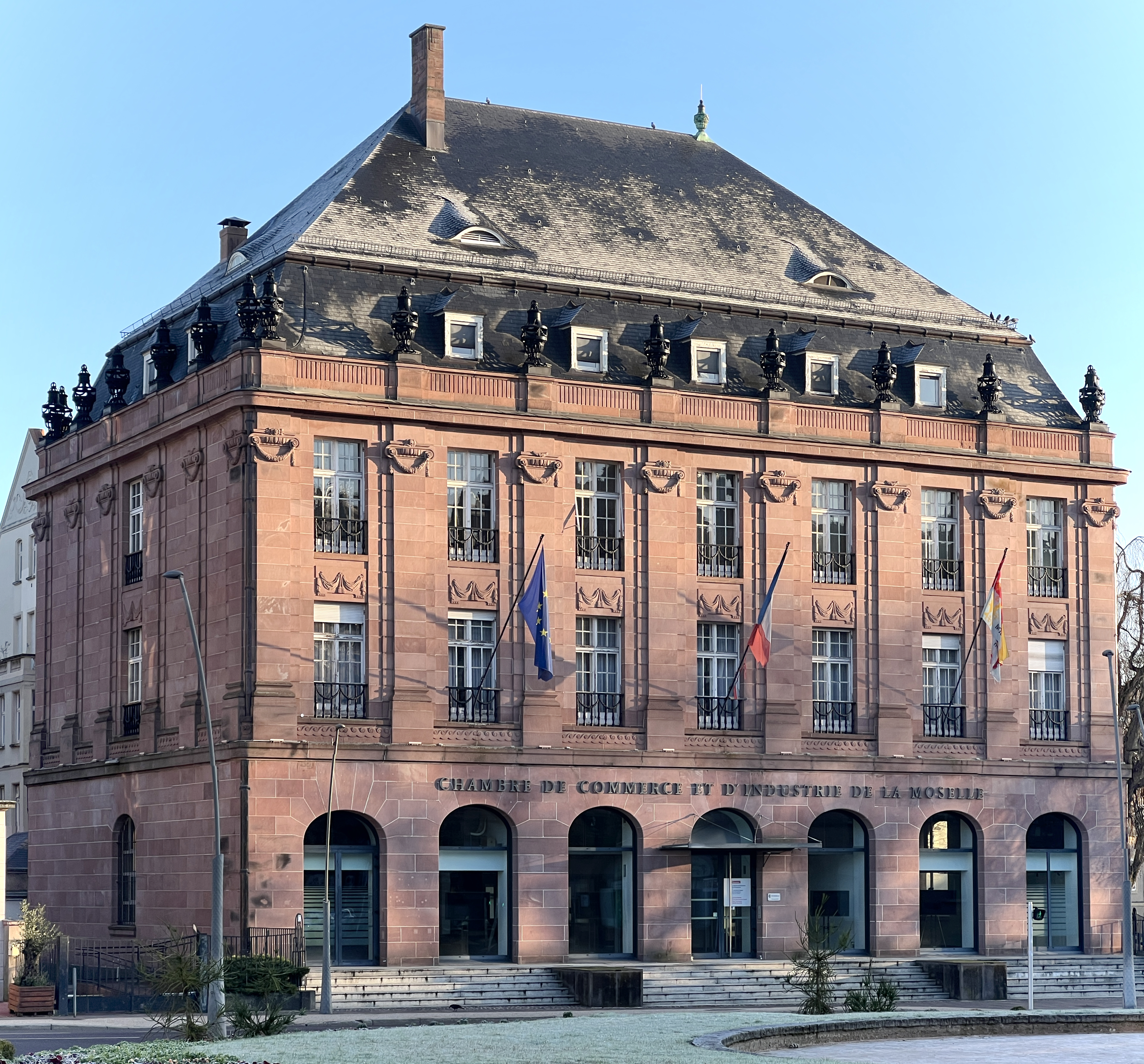
Metz branch, 10-12 avenue Foch (arch. Curjel & Moser), completed 1907

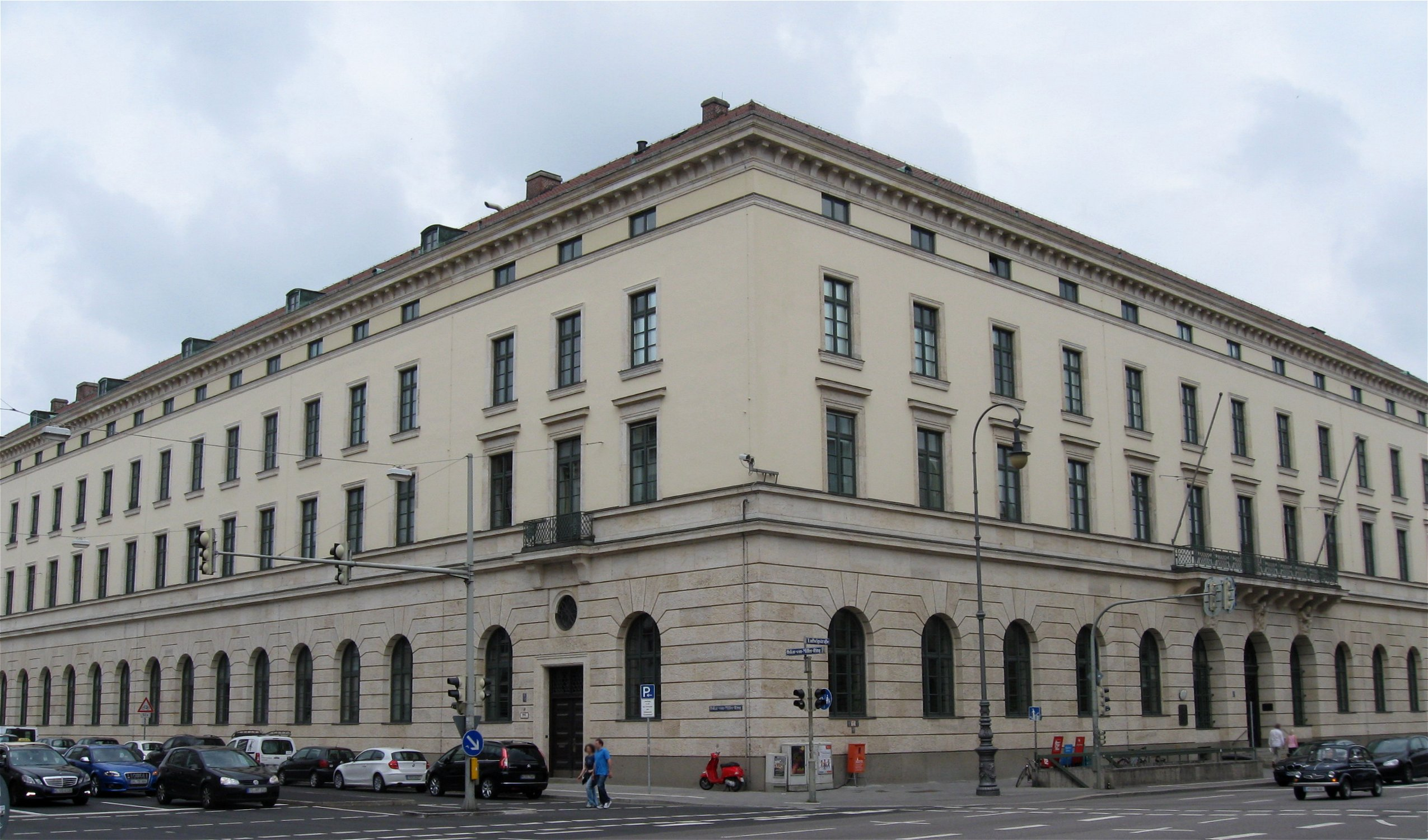
Munich branch, Ludwigstrasse 13 (arch. Wolff, then Carl Sattler), completed 1951 for the Bayerische Landeszentralbank

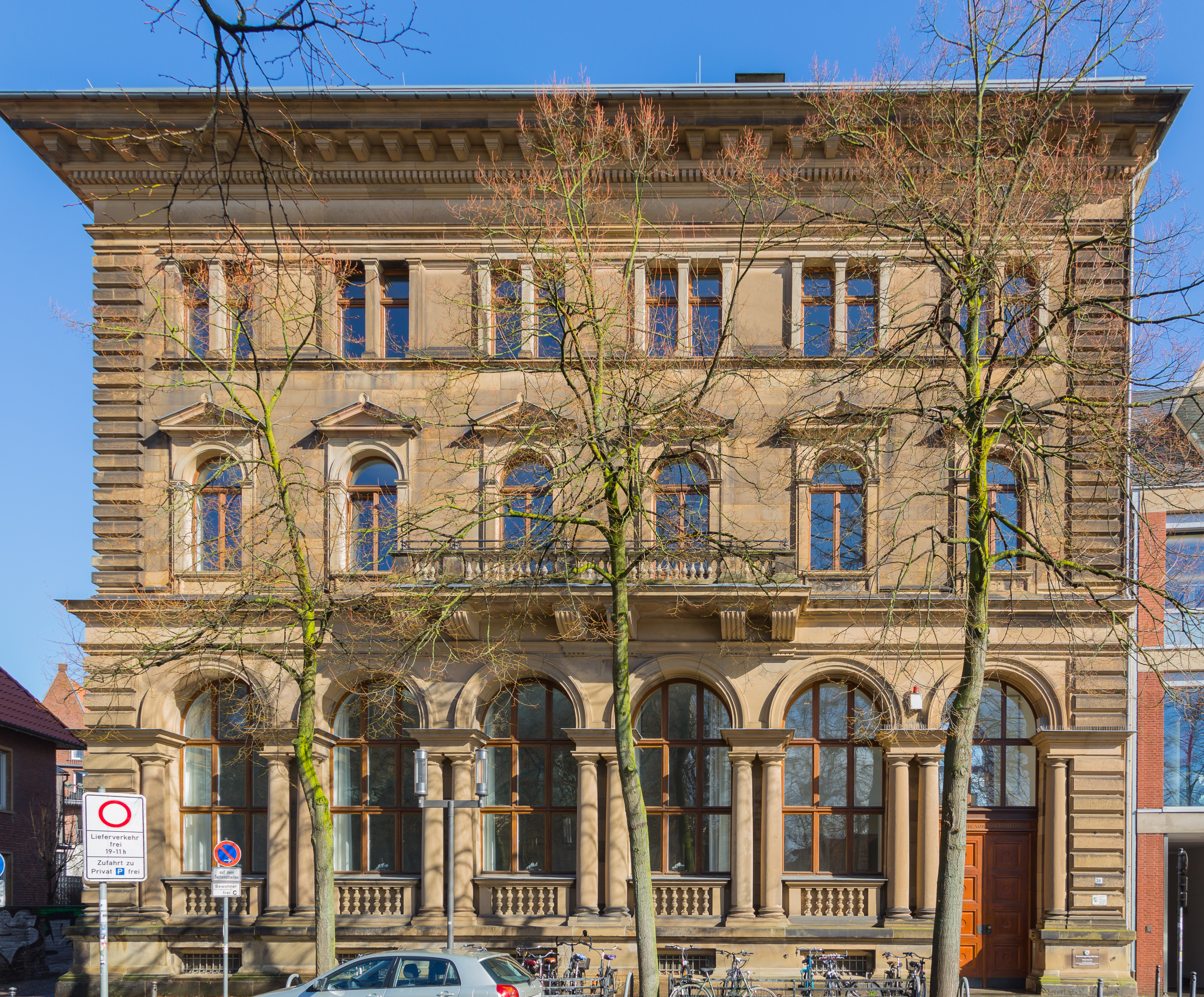
Münster branch, Domplatz 36 (arch. Hasak, Havestadt & Contag), completed 1894

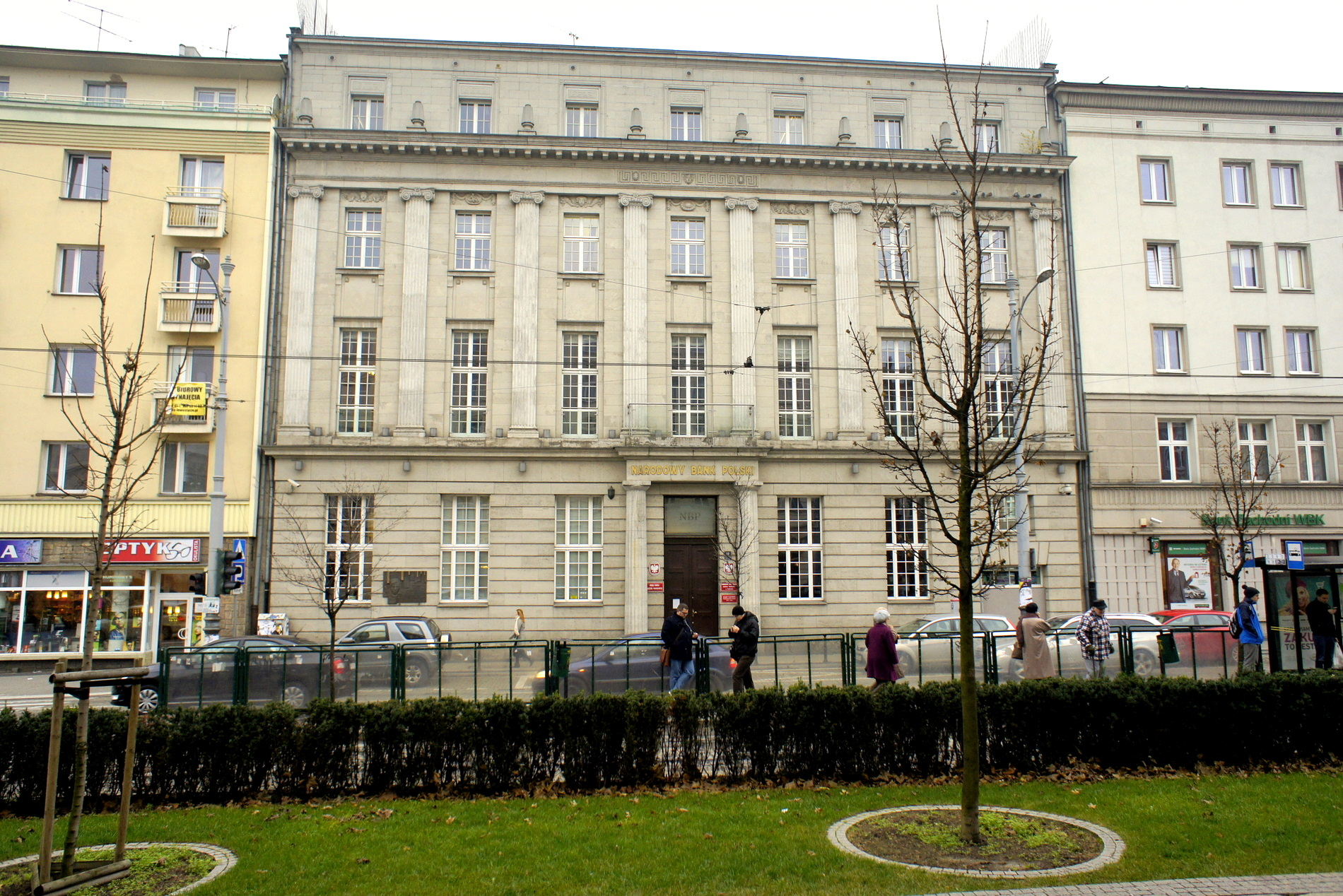
Poznań branch, al. Marcinkowskiego 12 (arch. Habicht), completed 1912 or 1913

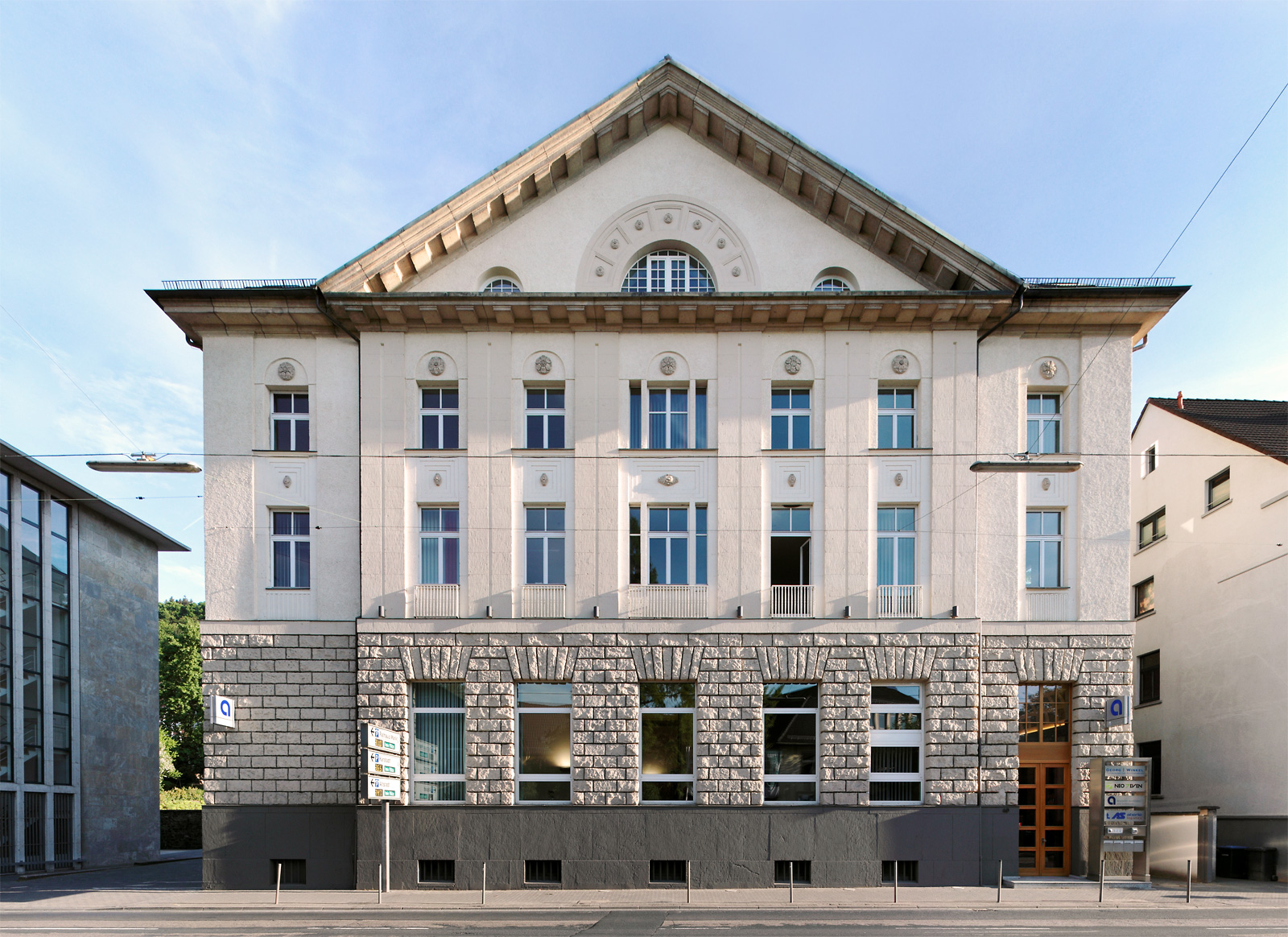
Siegen branch, Spandauer Straße 40 (arch. Habicht), completed 1911

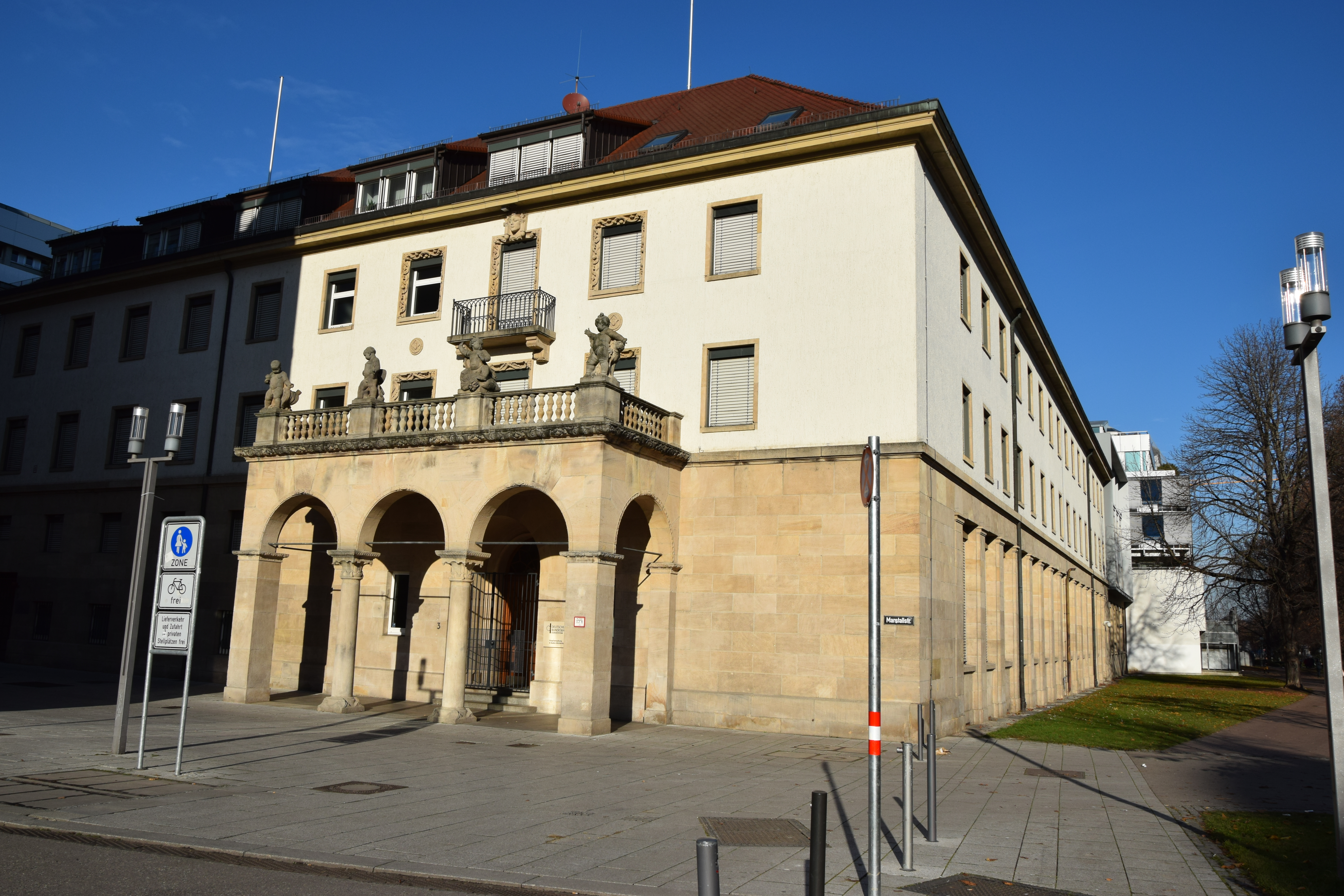
Stuttgart branch, Marstallstrasse 3 (arch. Hans Herkommer & Theodor Bulling), completed 1923

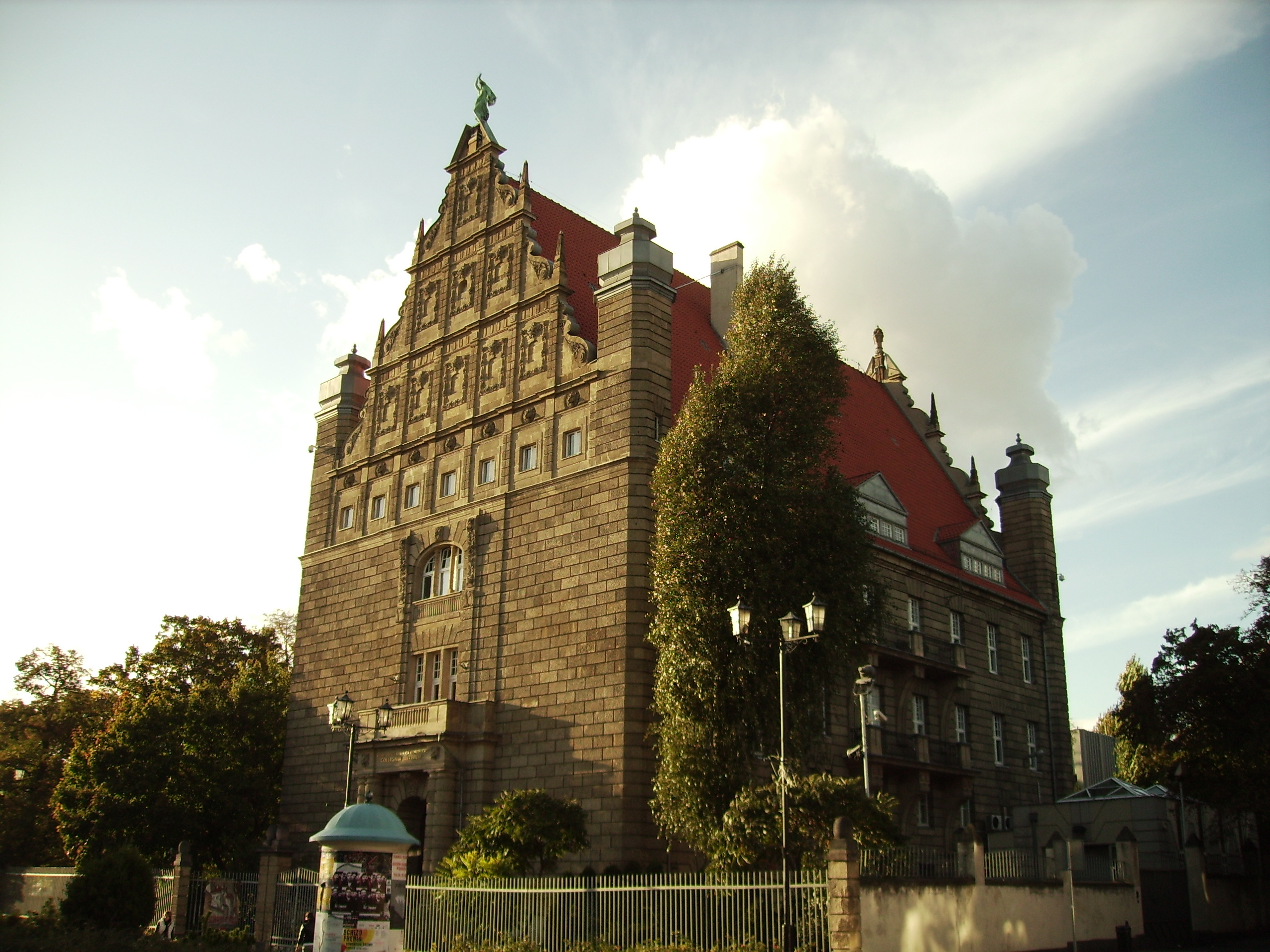
Thorn (now Toruń) branch, Plac Mariana Rapackiego (arch. Habicht), completed 1906

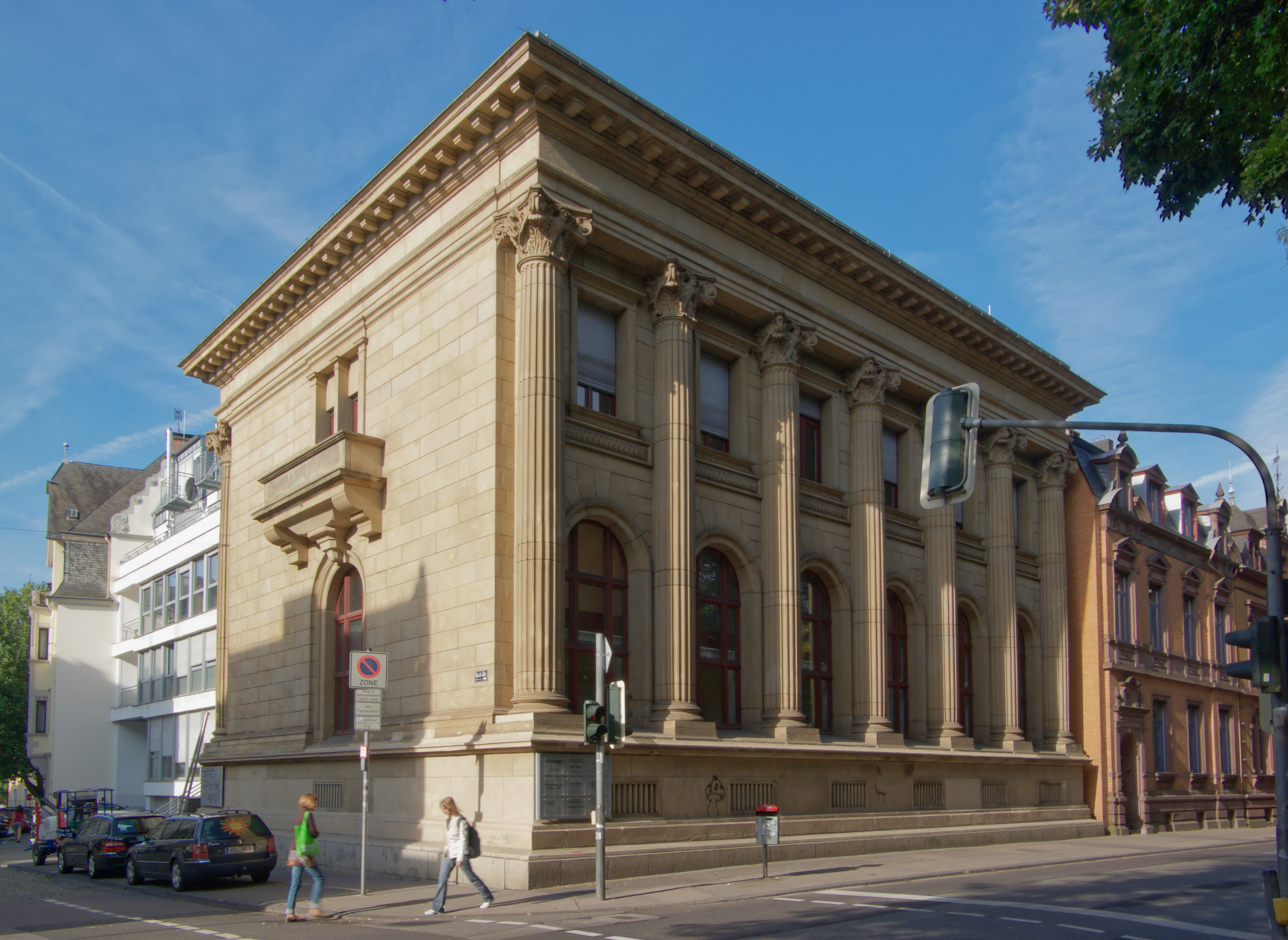
Trier branch, Kochstrasse 13 (arch. Hasak), completed 1903

== Presidents ==
No.	Picture	President of the Reichsbank	Took office	Left office	Time in office
1	Hermann von Dechend	Hermann von Dechend (1814–1890)	1876	1890	13–14 years
2	Richard Koch [de]	Richard Koch (1834–1910)	1890	1908	13–14 years
3	Rudolf Havenstein	Rudolf Havenstein (1857–1923)	1908	11 November 1923	14–15 years
4	Hjalmar Schacht	Hjalmar Schacht (1877–1970)	22 December 1923 (appointed Currency Commissioner on 12 November 1923)	6 March 1930	6 years
5	Hans Luther	Hans Luther (1879–1962)	7 March 1930	17 March 1933	3 years
(4)	Hjalmar Schacht	Hjalmar Schacht (1877–1970)	18 March 1933	19 January 1939	5 years
6	Walther Funk	Walther Funk (1890–1960)	20 January 1939	8 May 1945	6 years

== See also ==
- Austro-Hungarian Bank
- List of central banks
- List of banks in Germany
