= Aleijadinho =

Colonial Brazilian sculptor and architect (c.1738–1814)

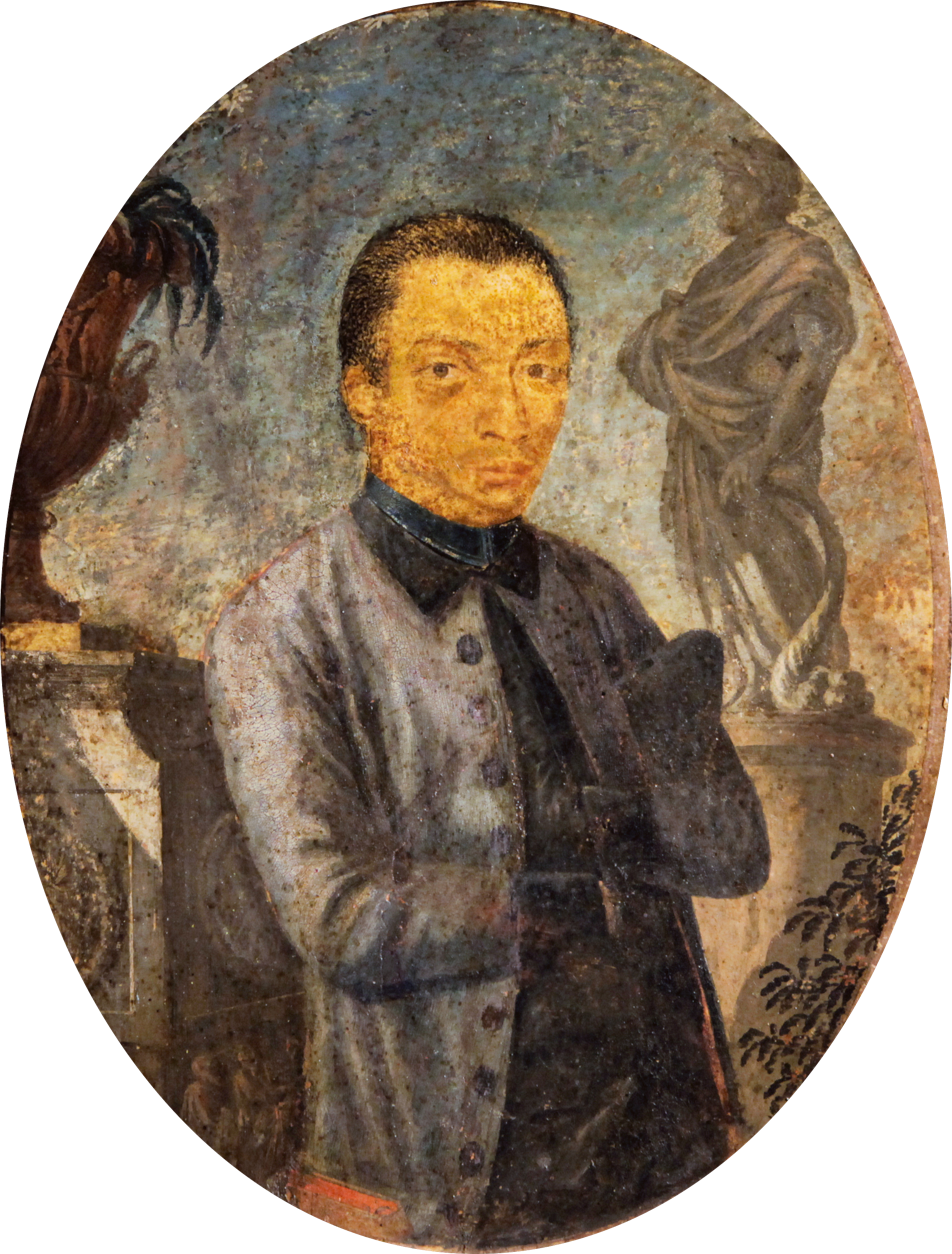
- Alleged posthumous portrait by Euclásio Ventura, 19th century, no contemporary depiction is known
- Born: 29 August 1738; Vila Rica (present day Ouro Preto), Minas Gerais, State of Brazil
- Died: 18 November 1814 (aged 76); Vila Rica, Minas Gerais, State of Brazil
- Known for: Sculpting, architecture
- Movement: Baroque and Rococo

Antônio Francisco Lisboa (c. 29 August 1730 or 1738 – 18 November 1814), better known as Aleijadinho (Portuguese pronunciation: [aleiʒaˈdʒiɲu], lit. 'little cripple'), was a sculptor, carver and architect of Colonial Brazil, noted for his works on and in various churches of Brazil. With a style related to Baroque and Rococo, Aleijadinho is considered almost by consensus as the greatest exponent of colonial art in Brazil by Brazilian critics and, surpassing Brazilian borders, for some foreign scholars he is the greatest name of Baroque in the Americas.

Little is known with certainty about his biography, which remains shrouded in legend and controversy to this day, making the research work on his life very arduous. The main documentary source on Aleijadinho is a biographical note written only about forty years after his death. His trajectory is reconstructed mainly through the works he left behind, although even in this context his contribution is controversial, since the attribution of authorship for most of the more than four hundred creations that exist today associated with his name was made without any documentary evidence, based only on stylistic similarity with documented pieces.

All of his work, including carvings, architectural projects, reliefs and statuary, was carried out in Minas Gerais, especially in the cities of Ouro Preto, Sabará, São João del-Rei and Congonhas. The main monuments that contain his works are the Church of Saint Francis of Assisi in Ouro Preto and the Sanctuary of Bom Jesus of Matosinhos.

He is the Patron of the 44th chair of the Brazilian Academy of Fine Arts.

== Biography ==
Little is known about the life of Antônio Francisco Lisboa. Practically all the data available today are derived from a biography written in 1858 by Rodrigo José Ferreira Bretas, 44 years after Aleijadinho's death, allegedly based on documents and testimonies of individuals who had known the artist personally. However, recent criticism has tended to consider this biography largely fanciful, part of a process of magnification and dramatization of his personality and work, in a romanticized manipulation of his figure whose aim was to elevate him to the status of an icon of Brazilianness, a mix of hero and artist, a "singular genius, sacred and consecrated", as Roger Chartier described it. Bretas' account, however, cannot be completely discarded, since being the oldest substantial biographical note on Aleijadinho, most of the later biographies were based on it, but the information it brings needs to be seen with some skepticism, being difficult to distinguish what is fact from what has been distorted by popular tradition and by the writer's interpretations. Biographies and critical studies carried out by Brazilian modernists in the first half of the 20th century also made biased interpretations of his life and work, increasing the amount of stereotypes around him, which are still perpetuated today in the popular imagination and in part of the critics, and are explored both by official cultural instances and by tourism agencies in the cities where he left his production.

The first official news about Aleijadinho appeared in 1790 in a memorandum written by captain Joaquim José da Silva, complying with the royal order of 20 July 1782, which determined that notable events, of which there was certain news, that had occurred since the foundation be recorded in an official book of the Captaincy of Minas Gerais. The memorandum, written while Aleijadinho was still alive, contained a description of the artist's most notable works and some biographical indications, and was partly based on it that Bretas wrote Traços biográficos relativos ao finado Antônio Francisco Lisboa, distinto escultor mineiro, mais conhecido pelo apelido de Aleijadinho, where he reproduced excerpts from the original document, which was later lost.

=== Early years ===
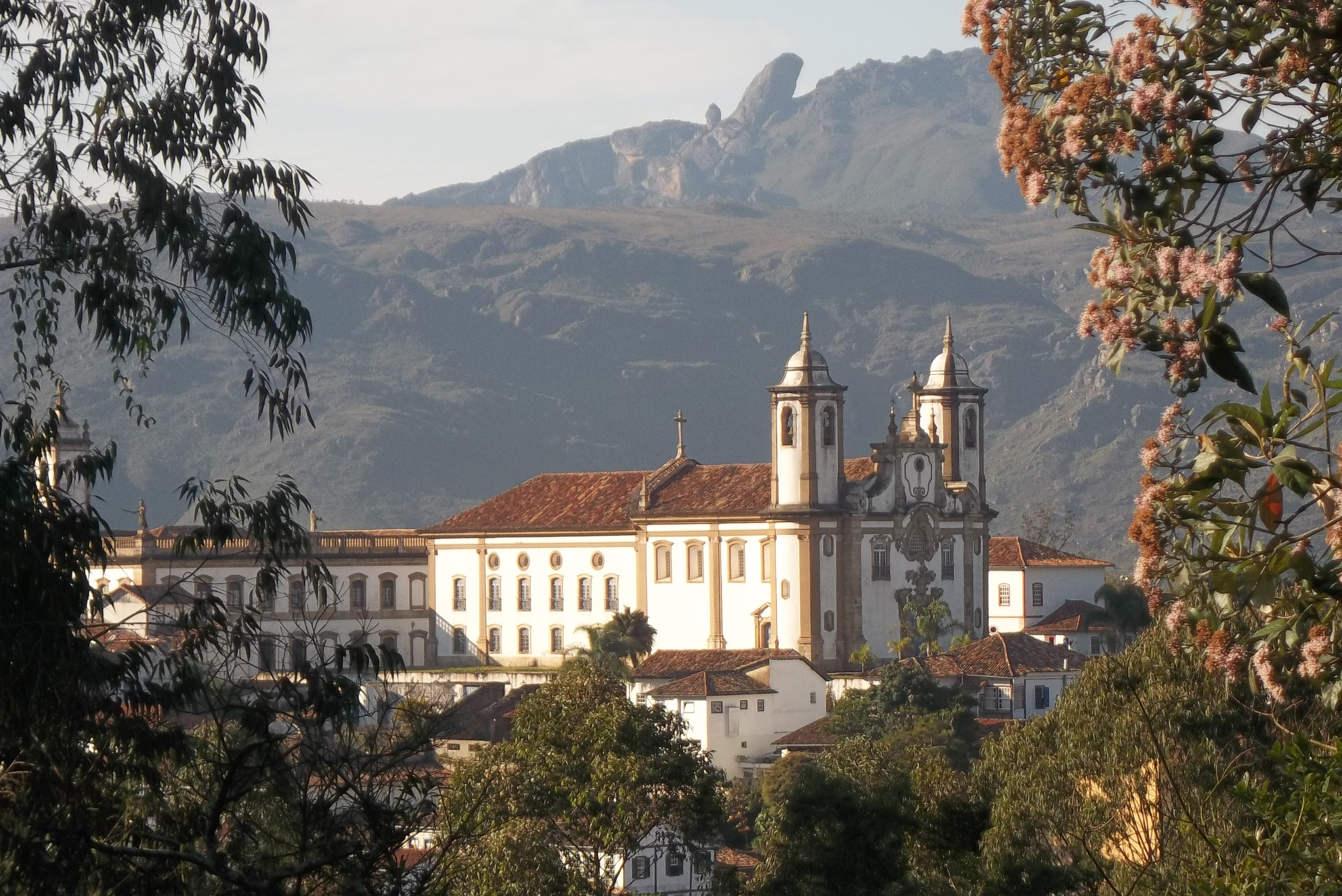
View of Ouro Preto, with the Church of Our Lady of Mount Carmel, partly designed by Aleijadinho, in the background

Antônio Francisco Lisboa was the son of a respected Portuguese master builder and architect, Manuel Francisco Lisboa, and his African slave, Isabel. In the baptismal certificate, cited by Bretas, it appears that Antônio, born a slave, was baptized on 29 August 1730, in what was then the town of Vila Rica (currently Ouro Preto) in the parish of Nossa Senhora da Conceição de Antônio Dias, with Antônio dos Reis as his godparent and being manumitted on the occasion by his father. The birth certificate does not contain the child's date of birth, which may have occurred a few days earlier. However, there are strong arguments that currently lead to considering it more likely that he was born in 1738, as his death certificate states the date of his death as 18 November 1814, adding that the artist was then 76 years old. The 1738 date is accepted by the Aleijadinho Museum, located in Ouro Preto, and according to biographer Silvio de Vasconcelos, the original manuscript by Bretas, found in the archives of the Archdiocese of Mariana, refers the birth to 1738, warning that the date corresponds to that recorded on Aleijadinho's death certificate; the reason for the discrepancy between the dates in the manuscript and the booklet that was printed is unclear. In 1738 Aleijadinho's father married Maria Antônia de São Pedro, an Azorean, and with her he gave Aleijadinho four half-siblings, and it was in this family that the artist grew up.

According to Bretas, Aleijadinho's knowledge of drawing, architecture and sculpture was obtained from his father and perhaps from draftsman and painter João Gomes Batista. From 1750 to 1759, he would have attended the boarding school at the Seminary of the Franciscans Donatos of the Hospício da Terra Santa, in Ouro Preto, where he would have learned grammar, Latin, mathematics and religion. Meanwhile, he assisted his father in the work he carried out at the Church of Antônio Dias and the Casa dos Contos, also working with his uncle Antônio Francisco Pombal, a carver, and Francisco Xavier de Brito. He collaborated with José Coelho Noronha in the work of carving the altars of the Mother Church of Caeté, his father's project. His first individual project dates back to 1752, a design for the fountain in the courtyard of the Governors Palace in Ouro Preto.

=== Maturity ===
In 1756 Aleijadinho may have gone to Rio de Janeiro accompanying Friar Lucas de Santa Clara, the transporter of gold and diamonds that were to be shipped to Lisbon, where he may have been influenced by local artists. Two years later, he would have created a soapstone fountain for the Terra Santa Hospice and soon after launched himself as a self-employed professional. However, being a mulatto, he was often forced to accept contracts as a day laborer and not as a master. From the 1760s until close to his death, Aleijadinho produced a large number of works, but in the absence of supporting documentation, several have a controversial authorship and are strictly considered only attributions, based on criteria of stylistic similarity with his authenticated production. With his father's death in 1767, Aleijadinho, as a bastard son, was not contemplated in the will. The following year, he enlisted in the Infantry Regiment of the Brown Men of Ouro Preto, where he remained for three years, without discontinuing his artistic activity. During this period, he received important commissions: the design of the façade of the Church of Our Lady of Carmel, in Sabará, and the pulpits of the Church of Saint Francis of Assisi, in Ouro Preto.

Around 1770 he organized his workshop, which was in full expansion, according to the model of craft guilds or medieval guilds, which in 1772 was regulated and recognized by the Chamber of Ouro Preto. Still in 1772, on 5 August, he was received as a brother in the Brotherhood of São José de Ouro Preto. On 4 March 1776, the governor of the Captaincy of Minas Gerais, Dom Antônio de Noronha, following the instructions of the viceroy, summoned masons, carpenters, locksmiths and blacksmiths to join a military battalion that would work on the reconstruction of a fort in Rio Grande do Sul. Aleijadinho would have been obliged to answer the call, even traveling to Rio de Janeiro, but then he would have been dismissed. In Rio, he arranged for the judicial record of the paternity of a son he had with Narcisa Rodrigues da Conceição, a mulatto, a son who was named, like his grandfather, Manuel Francisco Lisboa. She later abandoned him and took the child to Rio de Janeiro, where he later became an artisan.

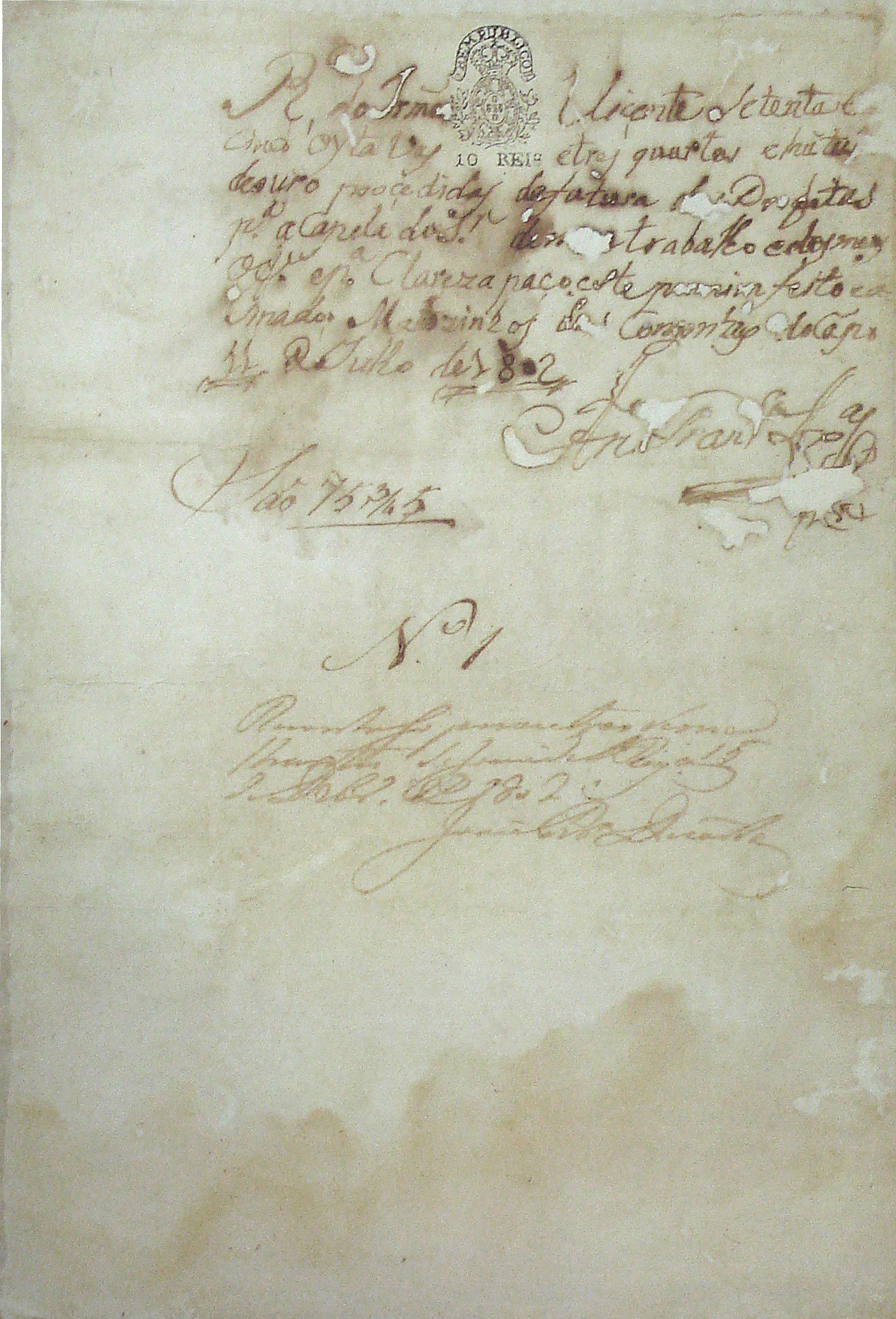
Receipt signed by Aleijadinho when he received payment for the work on the Twelve Prophets

Until then, according to Bretas, Aleijadinho had enjoyed good health and the pleasures of the popular parties and dances, but from 1777 onwards, signs of a serious illness began to appear. Over the years the illness deformed his body and hindered his work, causing him great suffering. To this day, as Bretas recognized, the exact nature of his illness is unknown, and several diagnostic proposals have been offered by various historians and physicians. Even with increasing difficulty, Aleijadinho continued to work intensively. On 9 December 1787, he formally assumed the role of judge of the Brotherhood of Saint Joseph. In 1790, captain Joaquim José da Silva wrote his important memorandum to the Chamber of Mariana, partially transcribed by Bretas, where he gave various data about the artist, and, witnessing the fame that accompanied him by then, greeted him as:

"The new Praxiteles... which equally honors architecture and sculpture... Superior to everything else and unique in stone sculptures in full relief or half relief and in irregular outlines and ornaments of the best French taste is the aforementioned Antônio Francisco. In any piece of his that serves to enhance the most elegant buildings, one admires the invention, the natural or composed balance, the accuracy of the dimensions, the energy of the uses and customs and the choice and arrangement of the accessories with the believable groups that inspire the beauty of nature. So much preciousness is found deposited in a sick body that needs to be carried everywhere and [needs to have] the irons (working tools) tied to it [in order] to be able to work".

=== Final years and death ===
In 1796 Aleijadinho received another commission of great importance, for the realization of sculptures of the Via Sacra and the Prophets for the Sanctuary of Bom Jesus of Matosinhos, in Congonhas, considered to be his masterpiece. In the 1804 census, his son appeared as one of his dependents, along with his daughter-in-law Joana and a grandson. Between 1807 and 1809, with his illness being at an advanced stage, he closed his workshop, but still carried out some work. From 1812 onwards, his health deteriorated further and he began to depend heavily on the people who cared for him. Aleijadinho moved to a house near the Church of Our Lady of Carmel in Ouro Preto, to supervise the works that were in charge of his disciple Justino de Almeida. By this time, he was nearly blind and his motor skills were greatly reduced. For a brief period he returned to his old home, but soon had to settle down at his daughter-in-law's house, who, according to Bretas, took care of him until his death on 18 November 1814. Aleijadinho was buried in the Mother Church of Antônio Dias, in a tomb next to the altar of Our Lady of the Good Death.

== The man, the disease and the myth ==
Aleijadinho was described by Bretas in the following terms:

"He was dark brown, had a strong voice, a passionate speech, and an angry temper: his stature was short, his body was full and poorly shaped, his face and head were round, and his forehead was voluminous, his hair was black and curly, that of his beard [was] bushy and broad, broad forehead, regular and somewhat pointed nose, thick lips, large ears, and short neck".

Almost nothing is recorded about his personal life, except that he liked to entertain himself in "vulgar dances" and eat well, and that he fell in love with the mulatto Narcisa, with whom he had a son. Nothing was said about his artistic, social or political ideas. He always worked under the commission regime, earning half an eighth of gold a day, but he did not accumulate a fortune, rather, it is said that he was careless with money, being robbed several times. On the other hand, he would have made repeated donations to the poor. He kept three slaves: Maurício, his main helper with whom he shared his earnings, plus Agostinho, a carving assistant, and Januário, who guided the donkey he used to go around on.

Bretas reported that after 1777 Lisboa began to show signs of a mysterious degenerative disease, which earned him the nickname Aleijadinho, i.e. 'little cripple'. His body gradually deformed, which caused him continuous pain; he would have lost several fingers, leaving only his index and thumb, and all of his feet, forcing him to walk on his knees. In order to work, he had to have the chisels tied to his stump hands, and in the most advanced stage of the disease he had to be carried around for all his trips — receipts for payments from slaves who took him around survive, attesting to this. His face was also damaged, lending it a grotesque appearance. According to the report, Aleijadinho was fully aware of his terrible appearance, and for this reason he developed a perennially revolted, angry and suspicious mood, imagining that even the praise he received for his artistic achievements were disguised mockery.

In order to hide his deformity, he wore loose-fitting clothes and large hats that hid his face. He also began to prefer to work at night, when he could not be seen easily, and inside a space closed by awnings. According to Bretas, citing what he learned from Aleijadinho's daughter-in-law, in his last two years, when he could no longer work and spent most of his time in bed, one side of his body was covered with sores, and he constantly begged that Christ came to give him death and deliver him from his life of suffering, resting his holy feet on his miserable body. However, testimonies of the time do not agree on the nature or extent of his deformities. John Bury says that the version that presents him without hands originated with John Luccock, who visited Minas Gerais in 1818, and is repeated by many others, but Auguste de Saint-Hilaire, for example, who was there at the same time, mentioned that Aleijadinho had preserved his hands, albeit paralyzed, a version repeated by Wilhelm Ludwig von Eschwege. The exhumation of his remains in 1930 was inconclusive. The terminal bones of the fingers and toes were not found, but they may have disintegrated after burial, a hypothesis suggested by the state of decay of the larger bones.

Several diagnoses have been proposed to explain this disease, all conjectural, which include, among others, leprosy (an unlikely alternative, since Aleijadinho was not excluded from social life, as was the case with all lepers), deforming rheumatism, yaws, "cardine" intoxication (an unknown substance said to have the power to enhance his artistic gifts, according to an ancient account), syphilis, scurvy, physical trauma from a fall, rheumatoid arthritis, poliomyelitis and porphyria (a disease that produces photosensitivity — which would explain the fact that the artist worked at night or protected by an awning).

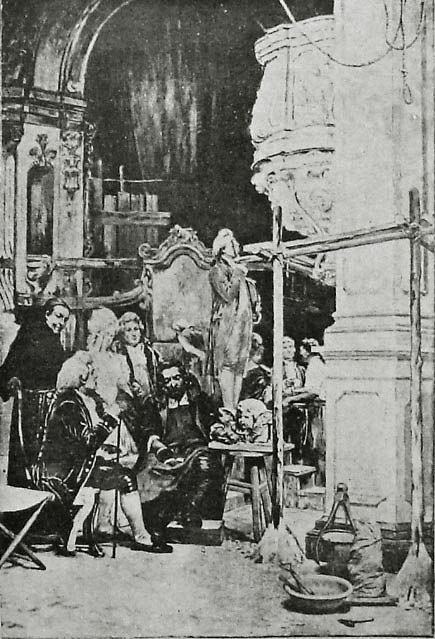
Aleijadinho in Vila Rica, 1898–1904, romantic reconstruction of an imaginary scene in the artist's life, by Henrique Bernardelli. Reproduction in Kósmos magazine of a lost screen

The construction of the myth around Aleijadinho already began in the pioneering biography of Bretas, who, despite warning to the fact that "when an individual becomes famous and admirable in any genre, there are those who, lovers of the marvelous, exaggerate indefinitely what is extraordinary in him, and from the exaggerations that succeed and accumulate, a truly ideal entity finally composes", nevertheless, Bretas praised Aleijadinho's achievements against a hostile environment and an overwhelming illness. At the beginning of the 20th century, interested in defining a new sense of Brazilianness, the modernists took Aleijadinho as a paradigm, a mulatto, a symbol of the Brazilian cultural and ethnic syncretism, who managed to transform the Portuguese heritage into something original, and a lot of bibliography was produced in that sense, creating an aura around him that was assumed by the official instances of the national culture.

One of the most active elements in the construction of the "Aleijadinho myth" concerns the relentless search for confirming signs of its originality, of its "uniqueness" in the panorama of Brazilian art, representing an event so special that it would transcend even the style of its time. However, this search is a peculiar interpretation of the aesthetic phenomenon that was born during Romanticism in the 19th century, when the creator began to be strongly associated with his creation, the latter being considering an exclusive property of the former, and attributing to the work the ability to display genuine reflections of personality and the individual soul that produced it. This entire set of ideas did not exist, at least not with the importance it acquired, during earlier periods, which excelled in the system of collective and often anonymous creation. Art tended to be considered a product of public utility, the clients determined the approach to be employed in the work, the stories and motifs did not belong to anyone, and the artist's personal voice should not prevail over established formal canons and collective concepts which they sought to convey, nor could the creator, in general terms, claim intellectual property over what he wrote, sculpted or painted.

Aleijadinho's illness also became an important element in this magnified picture. As summarized by Gomes Junior:

"In Brazil, Aleijadinho would not have escaped this collective representation that surrounds the artist. The account of midwife Joana Lopes, a woman from the people who served as the basis for both the stories that spread by word of mouth and for the work of biographers and historians, made Antônio Francisco Lisboa the arhcetype of the genius cursed by the disease. His formation is obscured in order to fix the idea of the uncultivated genius; his condition as a mulatto is noted to highlight his accomplishments within a slave-owning community; the collective nature of the artistic work is completely erased so that the individual assumes a demiurgical aspect; the effect of the disease is amplified so that the superhuman effort of his work becomes clear and so that beauty is highlighted in the frame of leprosy."

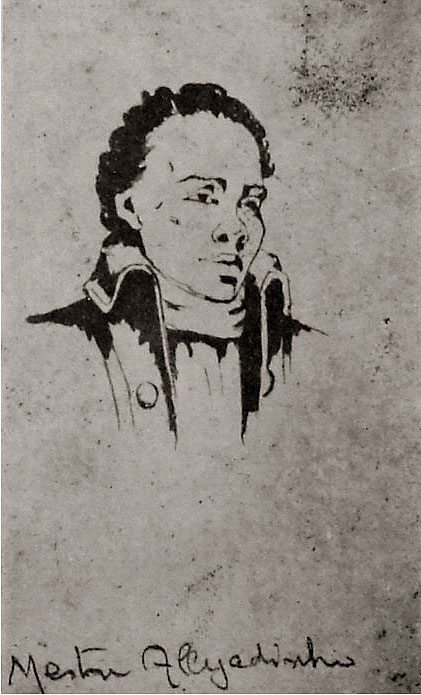
Imaginary portrait of Aleijadinho, by Henrique Bernardelli

The researcher also draws attention to the documentary evidence of receipts signed in 1796, in which Aleijadinho's handwriting is still firm and clear. This is an inexplicable fact if Bretas' biography or the 19th century reports of travelers, such as Luccock, Friedrich von Weech, Francis de Castelnau and others, certainly repeating what they had heard from the locals, claiming Aleijadinho had lost not only fingers, but even his hands, are taken into account. However, according to Bury, from that date his handwriting visibly deteriorated. Chartier, Hansen, Grammont and others have echoed the same arguments as Gomes Júnior; Barretto added that the figure of Aleijadinho is currently a decoy for tourism in Ouro Preto to such an extent that his illness, represented in the books, is "commercialized" in some tourist spots in the city. In the midst of this web of dubious biographical constructions largely consecrated by tradition, several scholars have tried to separate fact from legend, in an effort that began almost at the same time as the mythical image around it was created, with the pioneering writings of José Mariano Filho and Roger Bastide on this topic, later supported by several others such as those of the aforementioned authors.

=== Iconography ===
There is no news that Aleijadinho was portrayed in life. However, at the beginning of the 20th century, a small portrait of a well-dressed mulatto, with his hands hidden, was found in the ex-voto house of the Sanctuary of Bom Jesus de Matosinhos, in Congonhas. The work was then sold in 1916 to the Rio de Janeiro merchant Baerlein as a portrait of Aleijadinho, and after ending up in an antique shop, it was bought by Guilherme Guinle, at which point the authorship of the portrait was attributed to Manoel da Costa Ataíde. In 1941 Guinle donated the portrait to the Public Archives of Minas Gerais, where in 1956 it was rediscovered by historian Miguel Chiquiloff, who began a research of almost twenty years to prove its authenticity. Chiquiloff's conclusion was that the image does indeed represent Aleijadinho, but its authorship was attributed to an obscure painter, Euclásio Penna Ventura.

After that, a great debate was ignited in the press, and public opinion in Minas Gerais was induced to be favorable to the official recognition of the work as an authentic portrait of Aleijadinho; the proposal was even the subject of a bill that was submitted to the Legislative Assembly of Minas Gerais, but in accordance with an opinion of the State Council of Culture of Minas Gerais, which stated that "due to the absence of supporting elements, it is not possible to make any official pronouncement on the authenticity of the painting referred to in the process", the project was vetoed by the governor. However, the Assembly overturned the government veto and approved Law No. 5,984, of 12 September 1972, recognizing the portrait as the official and unique effigy of Antônio Francisco Lisboa. It is the image that illustrates the opening of this article. Some Brazilian artists have also offered conjectural versions of his appearance, among them Belmonte and Henrique Bernardelli.

== Historical and artistic context ==
=== Baroque and Rococo ===
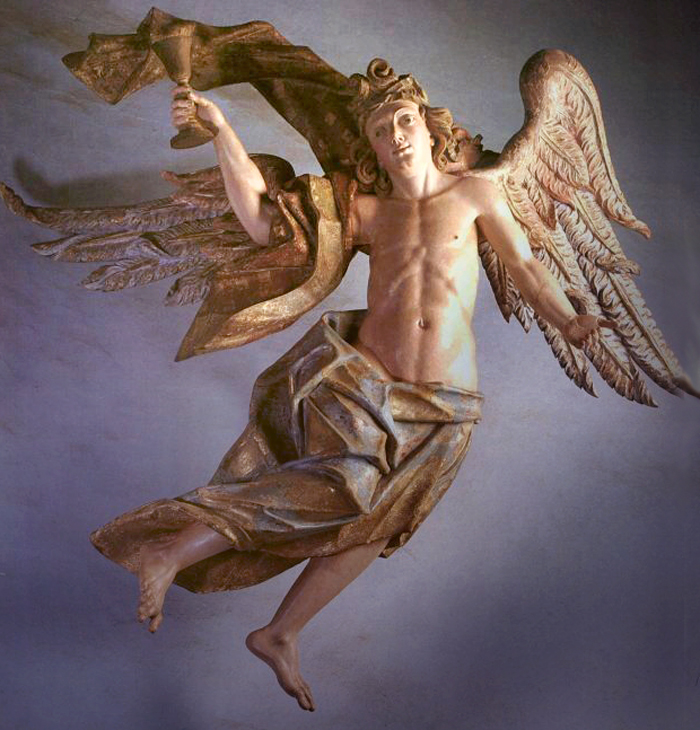
Angel with the chalice of Passion, in the Via Sacra of Congonhas

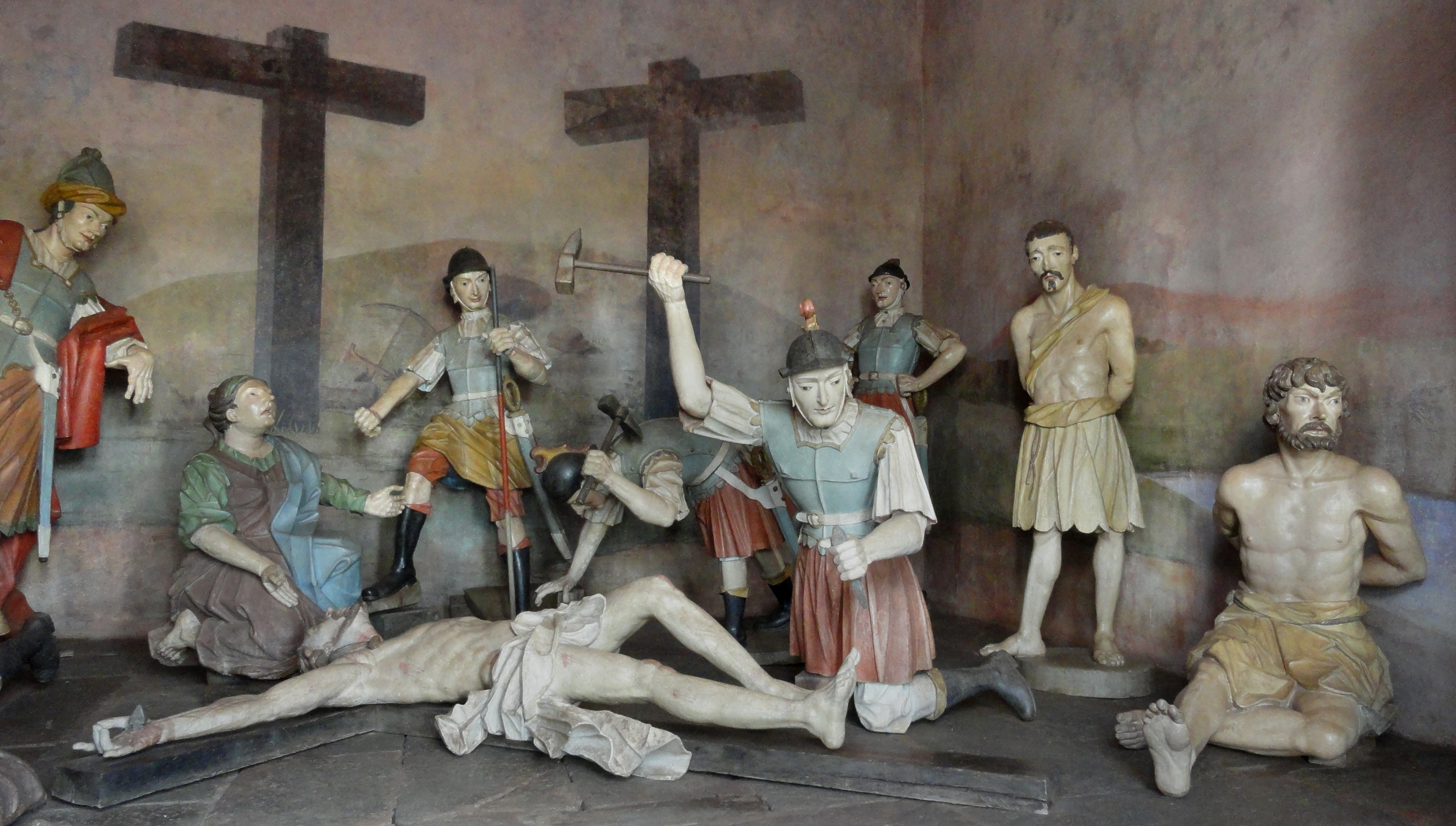
Crucifixion of Jesus, Conhonhas Sanctuary

Aleijadinho worked during the transition period from Baroque to Rococo; his work reflects characteristics of both. However, the distinction between them is not always clear, which makes many critics consider them a unit; for these critics, Rococo represents the final phase of the Baroque cycle. Others, in turn, understand Rococo as an autonomous and differentiated current. This debate affects Aleijadinho directly, and sometimes confuses the definition of his personal style and his insertion in the great international aesthetic currents.

Baroque, which emerged in Europe at the beginning of the 17th century, was a style of reaction against the Classicism of the Renaissance, whose conceptual bases revolved around symmetry, proportionality and containment, rationality and formal balance. Thus, Baroque aesthetics excelled for asymmetry, excess, expressiveness and irregularity. Beyond a purely aesthetic trend, these traits constituted a true way of life and set the tone for the entire culture of the period, a culture that emphasized contrast, conflict, dynamic, drama, grandiloquence, and the dissolution of boundaries, together with an accentuated taste for the opulence of forms and materials, making it a perfect vehicle for the Counter-Reformation of the Catholic Church and the rising absolutist monarchies to visibly express their ideals of glory and assert their political power. A correct understanding of Baroque in the arts cannot be achieved by analyzing individual works or artists, but rather by studying its cultural context and the architectural structures that were erected at that time — the palaces and the great theaters and churches — that served as a framework of a "total work of art", which included architecture itself, plus painting, sculpture, decorative and performing arts such as music, dance and theater, as Baroque sought to integrate all forms of expression into an enveloping, synthetic and unifying whole.

In Baroque Europe, the Catholic Church and the courts competed in artistic patronage. The Brazilian Baroque flourished in a very different context, in the period when Brazil was still a colony. The court was across the ocean, in the Portuguese metropole, and the internal administration that it imposed on the land was inefficient and time-consuming. This social space was immediately occupied by the Church through missionaries, who administered, in addition to divine offices, a series of civil services, were at the vanguard of the conquest of the interior of the territory, organized a good part of the urban space and dominated teaching and social assistance by maintaining schools and orphanages, hospitals and asylums. The Church also practically monopolized Brazilian colonial art, with a rare notable secular expression.

Having been born primarily as a reaction against Protestants, who condemned luxury in churches and the cult of images, the Baroque, particularly in Brazil, was a style moved mainly by religious inspiration, but, at the same time, it placed enormous emphasis on sensoriality, captivated by the richness of the materials and forms and by the decorative exuberance, trying to reconcile the illustration of spiritual glories with the appeal to worldly pleasure, seeing this as a particularly apt didactic instrument for moral and religious education. This ambiguous pact, when conditions allowed, created artistic monuments of enormous formal complexity and artistic richness.

In competition with Protestant dissidents, the Catholic clergy sought, in short, to co-opt more followers by translating the abstract meanings of their religion into a highly rhetorical visual language, which had a scenographic and declamatory sense, and which expressed itself full of hyperbole and other figures of speech, which was plastically reflected in the extreme complexity of the carving work and in the agitated and convoluted movement of the statuary, pictorial and architectural forms, which seduced by their sumptuousness and by the easily understandable motifs by the people. At a time when the population was mostly illiterate, Catholic Baroque art was a highly persuasive complement to the verbal catechism. The counter-reformist iconographic program chose the themes, the formal approach and the ways of narrative development of the visual discourse, foreseeing the achievement of a specific affective effect for each work. Privileging the most dramatic moments of sacred history, Christ being flogged, the Virgin with her heart pierced with knives, bloody crucifixes and martyrs in the apotheosis of their tortures multiplied. But that same devotion, which so often adored the tragic, also shaped countless scenes of ecstasy and heavenly visions, graceful Madonnas and sweet baby Jesus, whose appeal to the simple heart of the people was immediate and effective.

=== The gold cycle ===
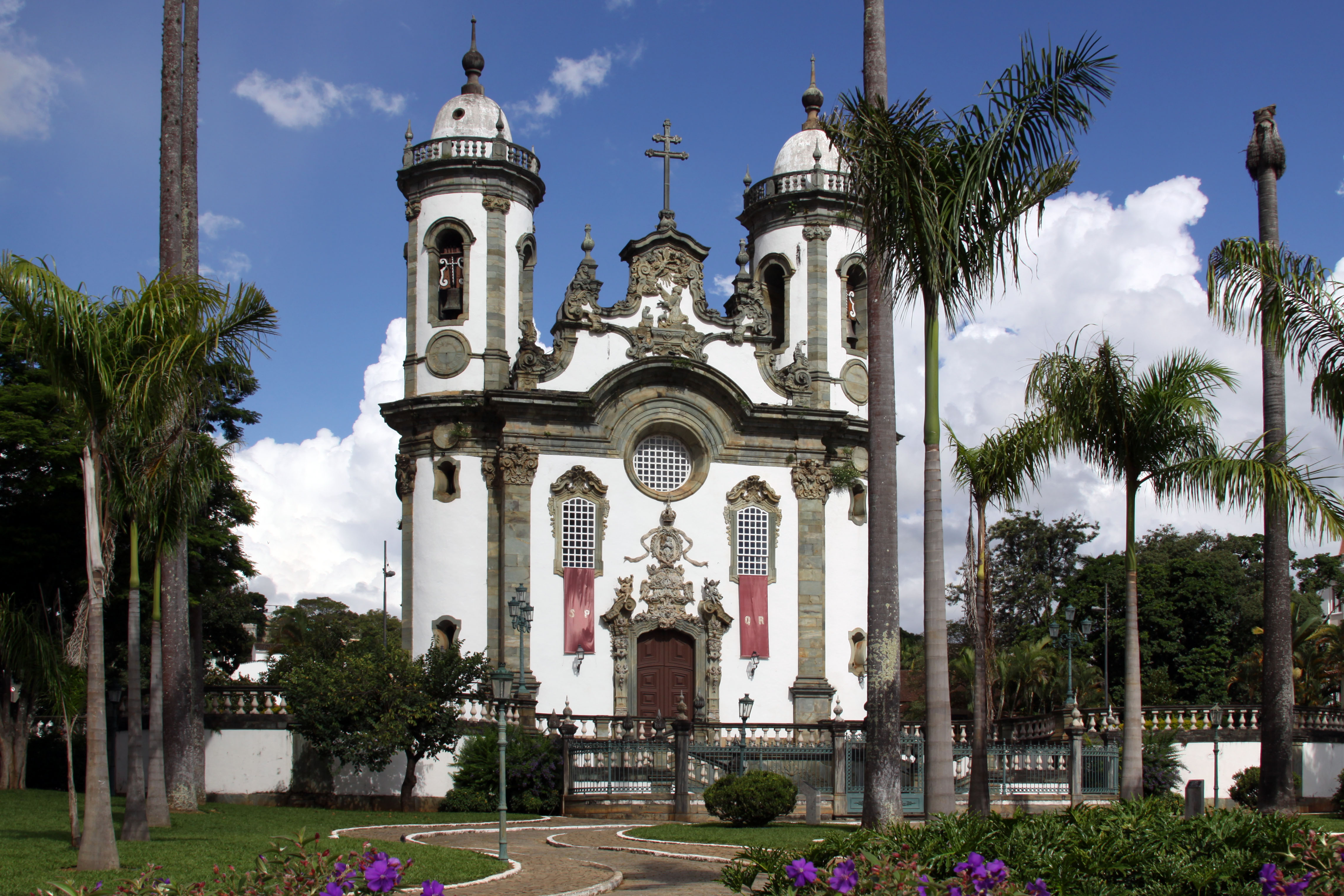
Church of Saint Francis of Assisi in São João del-Rei, designed by Aleijadinho and modified by Cerqueira

Minas Gerais had the peculiarity of being a more recent settlement area in relation to the Brazilian coast, and there it was possible to build with more freedom, in more updated aesthetics, in this case, the Rococo, a profusion of new churches, without having to adapt or renovate older buildings already established and still in use, as was the case on the coast, which makes them exemplary with regard to stylistic unity. The Rococo ensemble of churches in Minas Gerais is of special importance both for its richness and variety and for being a witness to a very specific phase of Brazilian history, when the region concentrated the attention of the Portuguese metropole for its large deposits of gold and diamonds and constituted the first nucleus of an eminently urban society in Brazil. The formulation of a differentiated artistic language in Minas Gerais was also due to two other important factors: its relative isolation from the rest of the colony and the sudden enrichment of the region with the discovery of the gold deposits. The style typically practiced in Minas Gerais had its main center in the old Vila Rica, today Ouro Preto, founded in 1711, but it also flourished vigorously in Diamantina, Mariana, Tiradentes, Sabará, Cachoeira do Campo, São João del-Rei, Congonhas and a number of other mining towns and villages. When gold began to run out, around 1760, the cultural cycle of the region also began to decline, but that was when its characteristic style, at this point already transitioning to Rococo, reached its culmination with the mature work of Aleijadinho and Master Ataíde. The wealth of the region in the 18th century also favored the emergence of an urban elite interested in art, sponsoring artists and appreciating secular works. According to Afonso Ávila,

"The unique experience of the Captaincy of Minas Gerais constituted, due to the peculiarities of the economic conditioning and the civilizing process, a unique moment in Brazilian cultural history. If gold and diamonds — or rather, if the mining industry was, in the field of economy, the material factor in the crystallization and autonomy of mountain culture, baroque atavism prepared its spiritual support, imprinting its ethical-religious standards on the life of the mining society and imposing its aesthetic values and tastes on creative manifestations. Without this unit of philosophical conformation, the sedimentation of a culture so authentic in its individuality would never be possible, a phenomenon not of a historical-regional contingency, but of a polarization of ethnic virtualities of the colonizing people who would find here exceptional conditions of expansion and affirmation".

The role of the brotherhoods in the social life of Minas Gerais, to which Aleijadinho connected through the Brotherhood of São José, which served mainly mulattos and attracted many carpenters, was important. They were organizations that sponsored the arts, fostered the spirit of Christian living, created a network of mutual assistance for their members, and dedicated themselves to caring for the poor. Many became very wealthy, and competed in building temples decorated with luxury and refinement, boasting paintings, carvings and statuary. It is also considered that the brotherhoods had a political side, acting in the construction of a social consciousness in an environment dominated by the Portuguese elite. At the time when Aleijadinho worked, Minas Gerais was in a state of political and social agitation, strongly pressured by the Portuguese Crown, which wanted the gold from the mines at any cost, and due to this intolerable pressure it became the headquarters of the Minas Gerais Conspiracy. It is documented that Aleijadinho had contact with one of the conspirators, Cláudio Manuel da Costa, but his political views are unknown.

Rococo can be succinctly described as a softening and lightening of the Baroque. In the opinion of Myriam Oliveira, the form of its introduction in Minas Gerais is obscure and controversial, and the only thing known for sure is that in the 1760s works along this line already appeared in various parts of the region, without any apparent connection between them. Other researchers attribute the emergence of the style in Minas Gerais to the spread of German and French engravings, statuary and Portuguese tiles, created in this aesthetic that was already consolidated in Europe at this point. Throughout colonial Brazil, art developed under a very precarious teaching structure, essentially artisanal and corporate, and the practice of learning through the study of reproductions of great examples of European art was a commonplace process among local artists, who looked to them for inspiration for their own work. It is also certain that Portuguese artists circulated in the region; they knew the art of the Metropolis well and naturally left their mark on the people of Minas Gerais.

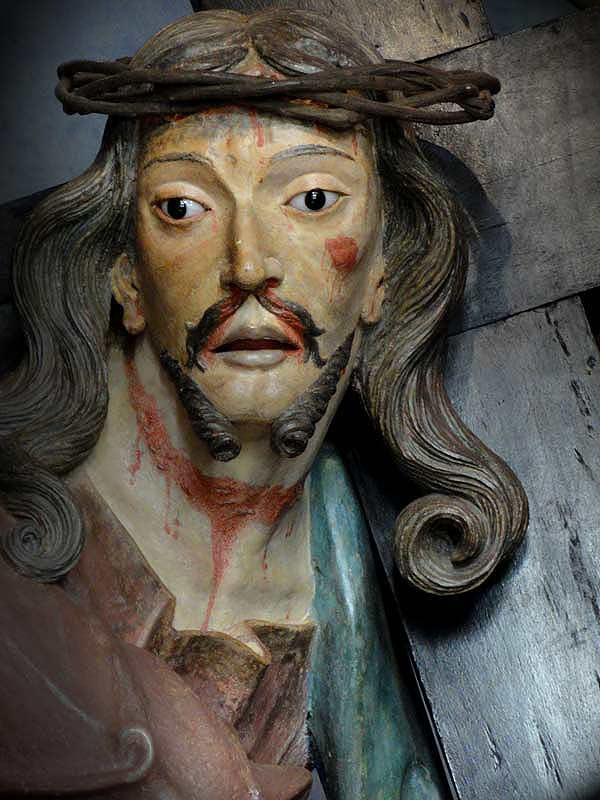
Detail of Christ carrying the cross, in the Via Sacra of Congonhas

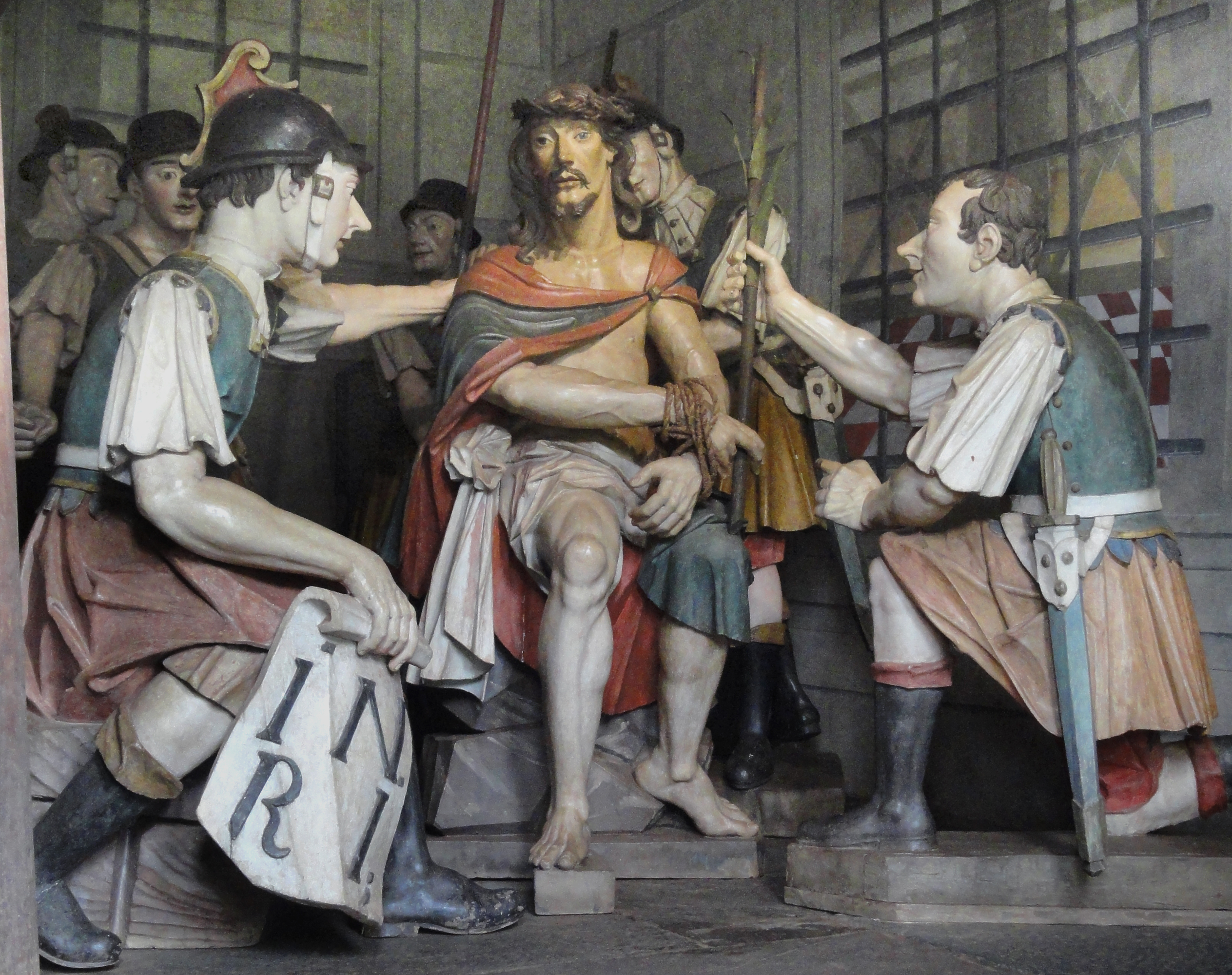
Jesus mocked by Roman soldiers, Sanctuary of Congonhas

In any case, Rococo was characterized by the abandonment of the heavy and compact decoration of the oldest and typically Baroque coastal temples, full of dense carvings, often completely covered in gold, framing compartmentalized panels painted in somber colors, the so-called "coffers", and instead adopting decorations that are more open, flowing, luminous and light. The softening was also imprinted on the architecture, with more elegant facades and more decorative porticos, larger windows for more effective internal lighting, busier plants, more docile materials such as soapstone, and interiors with a predominance of white, interspersed with more delicate and graceful carving, more expansive and also more sparse, often resorting to patterns derived from the shape of the shell with clear polychromies. The general approach to sacred iconography, however, was not greatly affected by Rococo in countries with a strong counter-reformist tradition such as Portugal and Brazil, continuing what was described about the theme in the Baroque, including the case of the sculptural works of Aleijadinho, whose drama and eloquence are remarkable.

Aleijadinho's affiliation with the aforementioned aesthetic schools is a matter of dispute; some authors even detected traces of archaic styles such as Gothic in his production, which he would have known through Florentine engravings. Mário de Andrade, in the enthusiasm that characterized the rediscovery of Aleijadinho by the modernists, went so far as to express himself about his style on an epic scale, saying that:

"The artist wandered around the world. Reinvented the world. Aleijadinho remembers everything! It evokes the Italian primitives, it outlines the Renaissance, it touches the Gothic, it is sometimes almost French, almost always very Germanic, it is Spanish in its mystical realism. An enormous cosmopolitan irregularity, which would have led him to something hopelessly dilettante if not for the strength of his conviction imprinted in his immortal works".

Sometimes Aleijadinho is analyzed as a transitional element between Baroque and Rococo, as is the case of Bazin, Brandão, Mills, Taylor and Graham. Others regard him as a typical Rococo master, such as James Hogan, for whom he was the greatest exponent of Brazilian Rococo, or Myriam Oliveira, a scholar of colonial art, who denounced the recurring tendency to assimilate the "Minas Gerais phenomenon" into the orbit of the Baroque, a basic flaw that she pointed out to exist in most modern studies on the art of the region and on Aleijadinho, and which originated the concept, so widespread, and for her false, of "Baroque from Minas Gerais". Others see it as a perfect example of Baroque, such as Clemente, Ferrer, Fuentes and Lezama Lima. John Bury considers that:

"Aleijadinho's style belongs to Baroque, in the broadest sense of the term. The spirit of Baroque was that of Catholic and imperial universality and, in that respect, Aleijadinho was a true master of that style. He instinctively grasped the basic notions of Baroque in terms of movement, limitlessness and theatrical spirit, as well as the idea that all arts, architecture, sculpture, carving, gilding, painting and even ephemeral spectacles... should be used as elements that harmoniously contribute to a grandiose illusory effect".

The influence of popular art on his work is also noted, as Junqueira Filho refers to when he states that Aleijadinho's uniqueness resides in the fact that he overcomes the talent of a simple copyist and the idiosyncrasies of a popular language that, however, remains visible as "a grace craft" in its process of appropriating cultured models, surpassing its models and acquiring a status of new and original work, an achievement that would be responsible for the universality of his contribution without implying the loss of its popular roots, also being a justification for its relevance in the panorama of Brazilian art.

== Works ==
=== The authorship and personal style issue ===
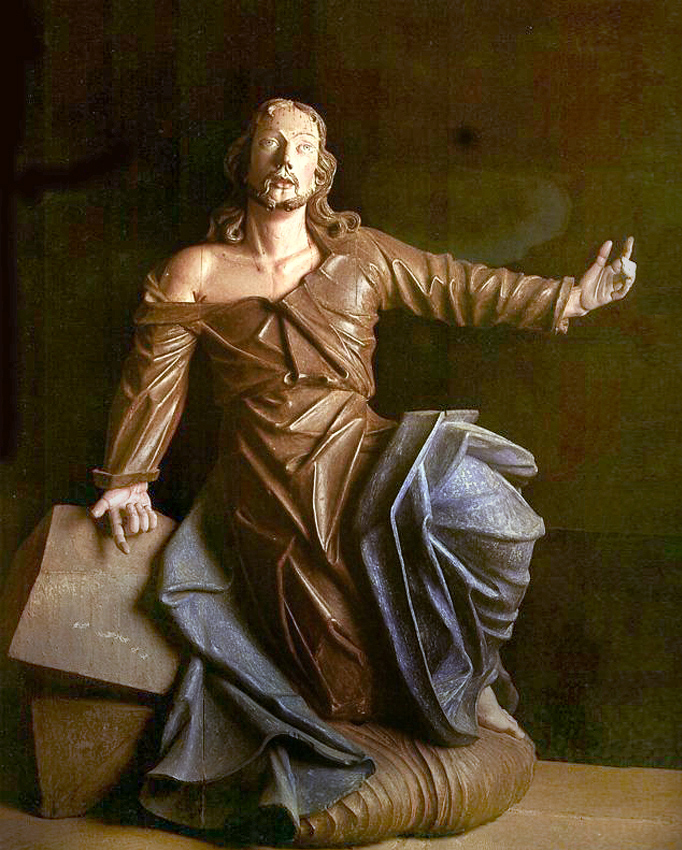
Christ in the Mount of Olives, Via Sacra of Congonhas

As with other colonial artists, identifying Aleijadinho's works is difficult due to the fact that artists of the time did not sign their works and the scarcity of documentary sources. In general, documents such as contracts and receipts agreed between religious brotherhoods and artists are the safest sources for attributing authorship. Also other documents, such as the Memory of the councilor of Mariana transcribed by Bretas and the oral tradition are useful elements. Stylistic comparisons between authenticated works and those of suggested authorship can be used to identify the author, although this criterion is always conjectural, even more so because it is known that Aleijadinho's "typical" style created a school, being continued by a large number of sculptors from Minas Gerais and copied until today by saint-makers in the region. Such a style was described by Silvio de Vasconcellos as having the following traits:

- Foot placements close to right angle;
- Drapes with sharp folds;
- Quadrangular proportions of the hands and nails, with a receding and elongated thumb, the index and little finger apart, and united ring and middle fingers of equal length; in female figures the fingers taper and undulate, rising in their middle thirds;
- Cleft chin;
- Half-open mouth and slightly fleshy but well-designed lips;
- Sharp and prominent nose, deep and marked nostrils;
- Slanted almond-shaped eyes, with accentuated teardrops and flat pupils; superciliary arches raised and joined in a "V" at the nose;
- Moustache arising from the nostrils, receding from the lips and blending with the beard; the latter is recessed on the face and is split into two rolls;
- Short arms, somewhat rigid, especially in the reliefs;
- Stylized hair, modeled as sinuous and grooved rolls, ending in volutes and with two locks over the forehead;
- Sharp expressiveness, penetrating gaze.

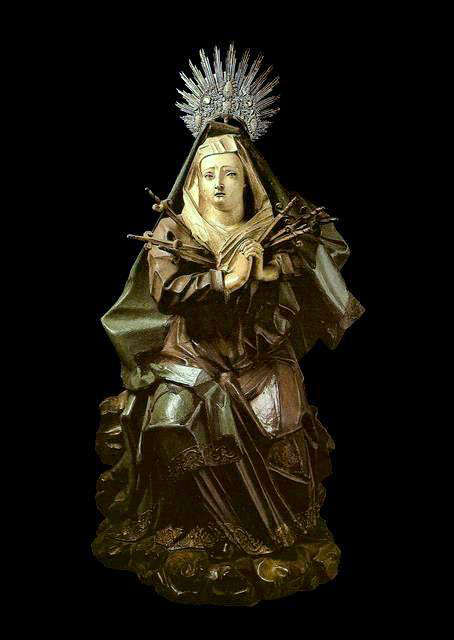
Nossa Senhora das Dores, traditionally attributed to Aleijadinho. Museum of Sacred Art of São Paulo

As an example, the image on the right illustrates one of the numerous works that have been accepted as his authorship based on stylistic comparison, a Nossa Senhora das Dores, today in the collection of the Museum of Sacred Art of São Paulo.

Beatriz Coelho divided his stylistic evolution into three phases: the first, between 1760 and 1774, when his style was undefined, looking for a characterization; the second, between 1774 and 1790, when he personalized himself and his works were defined by firmness and idealization, and the final one, between 1790 and his death, when stylization reached extremes, far from naturalism, trying to express spirituality and suffering.

Another aspect that must be taken into account is the work system in collective workshops that prevailed in Minas Gerais at the time; there is little certainty about the extent of his direct intervention in the execution of many of his works, even the documented ones. Often the master builders intervened in the original design of the churches, and construction supervision was carried out by teams from corporations, associated with the civil and ecclesiastical powers, which also had directive power. An indeterminate number of assistant craftsmen also participated in the carving of altars and sculptures, who, while following the guidelines of the designer in charge of the commission, left their distinctive mark on the finished pieces. As Angela Brandão said:

"Although the whole system of organization for the performance of mechanic crafts, inherited from Portuguese medieval models, has changed as it adapted to the Brazilian colony, it seems certain that both in Portugal and even more so in Brazil, the rigid division of functions carried out by different officers has never been carefully maintained... The overlapping or exercise of functions that extrapolated the professional limits established for each mechanical trade did not fail to generate conflicts... Different paths, taken into account, lead to the conclusion that artistic and craft works, in their various activities, intertwined their functions in the hands of different officials (the "officials of everything", in the sixteenth-century term), on construction sites and in the various tasks promoted by brotherhoods and the diocese in Minas Gerais in the eighteenth century".

Being one of the icons of Brazilian art today, Aleijadinho's work is highly valued in the market, and the issue of authorship attributions comes into play with strong pressure from various sectors involved, including official instances, collectors and art dealers. Although his documented work is limited to relatively few commissions (two of them including the large sculptural sets of Congonhas, the Via Sacra and the Prophets), the general catalog published by Márcio Jardim in 2006 listed 425 pieces as his exclusive work, without help by others, a much larger number than the 163 works counted in 1951, in the first cataloging. The number continues to grow: several pieces by hitherto unknown authorship have been "authenticated" in recent years, almost invariably without any documentary foundation. A critical study published in 2003 by researchers linked to the Brazilian National Institute of Historic and Artistic Heritage (IPHAN), Myriam Oliveira, Antônio Batista dos Santos and Olinto Rodrigues dos Santos Filho, contested hundreds of these attributions, and the book ended up having its entire edition seized by court order, issued in a lawsuit filed by Renato Whitaker, a great collector of Aleijadinho, who felt harmed by seeing several of his pieces discredited. The embargo, however, was later lifted. Other contestations came from Guiomar de Grammont, claiming that in his lifetime, and hampered by a limiting illness, it would be impossible for Aleijadinho to execute all the works attributed to him. She further claimed to have "reason to suspect that there is collusion between collectors and critics to value anonymous works".

=== Main works ===
==== Gilded woodcarving ====
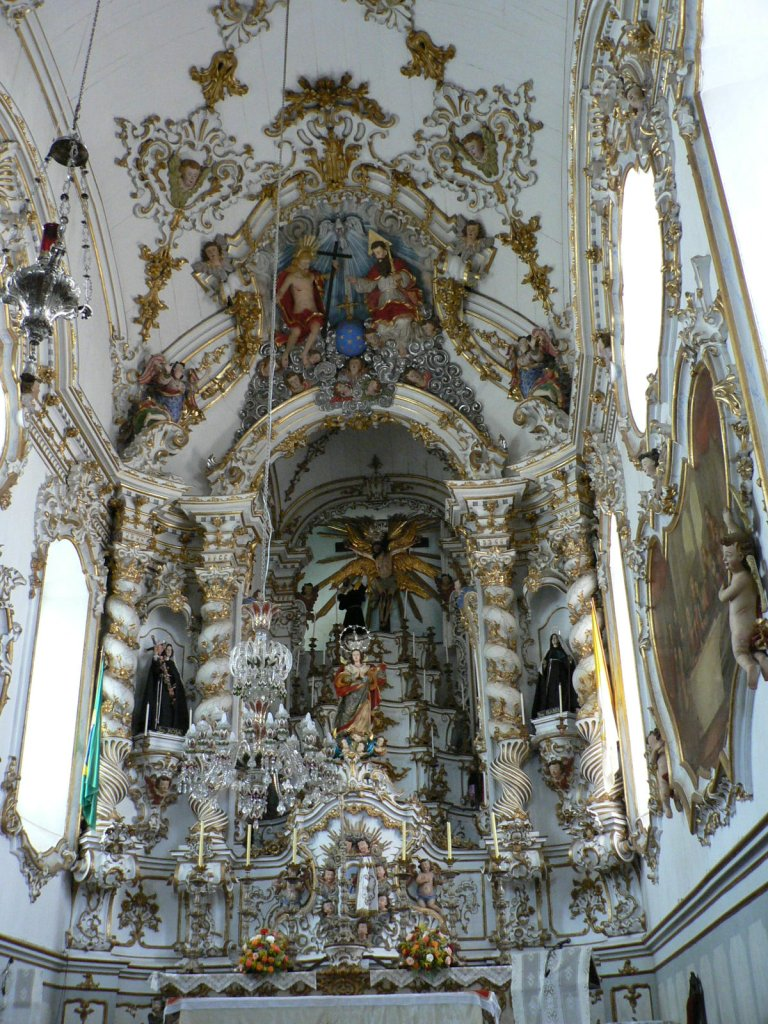
Altarpiece of the main chapel of the Church of Saint Francis in São João del-Rei

Aleijadinho's participation as a carver is documented in at least four large altarpieces, as designer and executor. In all of them, his personal style deviates at some significant points from the prevailing Baroque-Rococo models. The most striking feature in these complex compositions, both sculptural and architectural, is the transformation of the crowning arch, now without a pediment, replaced by an imposing statuary group, which, according to Oliveira, suggests the artist's primarily sculptural vocation. The first set was the project for the apse of the Church of São José in Ouro Preto, dated 1772, the year in which he joined the corresponding brotherhood. The works were carried out, however, by a poorly qualified craftsman, jeopardizing the aesthetic result. It still features a crowning canopy, but is now devoid of ornaments and boasts a sculptural group.

The most important ensemble is the altarpiece of the Church of Saint Francis of Assisi in Ouro Preto, where the tendency to populate the crowning with figures reaches its high point, with a large sculptural ensemble representing the Holy Trinity. This group not only completes the altarpiece, but is effectively integrated with the ornamentation of the vault, merging wall and ceiling in an upward thrust. All the woodwork on the altarpiece has a sculptural mark, more than merely decorative, and creates an original game of diagonal planes through its structural elements, which constitutes one of the distinctive elements of his style in this field, and which was repeated in another large complex he designed, for the Franciscan Church of São João del-Rei.

The final stage in the evolution of his style as a carver is illustrated by the altarpieces he created for the Church of Our Lady of Carmel in Ouro Preto, designed and executed by him between 1807 and 1809, being the last ones he created before his illness forced him to supervise rather than execute his ideas. These last pieces present a great formal reduction, with the reduction of the decorative elements to essential forms. The retables are markedly verticalized and fully fit within the Rococo canons; they completely abandon the scheme of the crowning arch, using only forms derived from the shell (the "rocalha") and branches as the central motifs of the ornaments. The shafts of the columns are no longer divided in two by a ring in the lower third, and the pelmet appears to be integrated into the composition by sinuous volutes.

==== Architecture ====
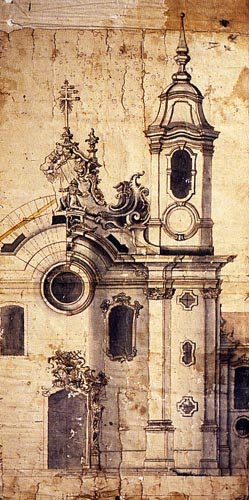
Project for the façade of the Church of Saint Francis in São João del-Rei

Aleijadinho worked as an architect, but the extent and nature of this activity are quite controversial. Only documentation survives on the design of two church facades, Our Lady of Carmel in Ouro Preto and Saint Francis of Assisi in São João del-Rei, both started in 1776, but whose outlines were changed in the 1770s.

Oral tradition holds that Aleijadinho was also the author of the design for the Church of Saint Francis of Assisi in Ouro Preto, but in relation to it, only his participation as a decorator is documented, creating and executing altarpieces, pulpits, a doorway and a washbasin. He also created, as already mentioned, projects for altarpieces and chapels, which fit more in the function of the decorator-carver, even though they have architectural proportions. Oliveira states that the comparison between the documented facade designs and what is traditionally attributed shows that they are dealing with very different stylistic universes, suggesting that the attribution of the Franciscan church of Ouro Preto to Aleijadinho is questionable to say the least. This presents a more compact model, with more dynamic volumes and poor ornamentation in the openings, except for the doorway, whose authorship is defined by Aleijadinho. Its aesthetics are more reminiscent of old Baroque models. The other two have decorated windows and less protruding volumes, and are conceived in the Rococo style.

The problems become more complex in the analysis of his contribution to the religious architecture of Minas Gerais when one notices the discrepancy between the design of the Church of Saint Francis of Assisi in São João del-Rei, which was recovered, with the result that is visible today, having undergone several modifications by Francisco de Lima Cerqueira, to the point of being fair to call him co-author of the work. According to Oliveira:

"The project drawn up by Aleijadinho in 1774 for the facade of the church of Saint Francis of São João del-Rei, which is located on the same evolutionary line of Ouro Preto's Carmel, would have come to characterize, if executed, the most genuinely Rococo of the Minas Gerais religious facades... the project, fortunately preserved, a beautiful and meticulous pen and ink drawing with the volumes marked in shading, gives a very precise idea of the author's original thought. The elegant chamfered and slightly rounded towers frame a slightly sinuous frontispiece like that of the Carmel church, with a similar design to that church, with the same bell-shaped crowning, in a more evolved treatment. Other similarities can be detected in the ornamental design of the doorway and window frames, differing, however, the model of the oculus and the pediment, flanked by vigorous flaming rocailles, which visually propel the central sculptural relief upwards with the scene of the vision of Saint Francis on Mount Alverne".

==== Sculpture ====
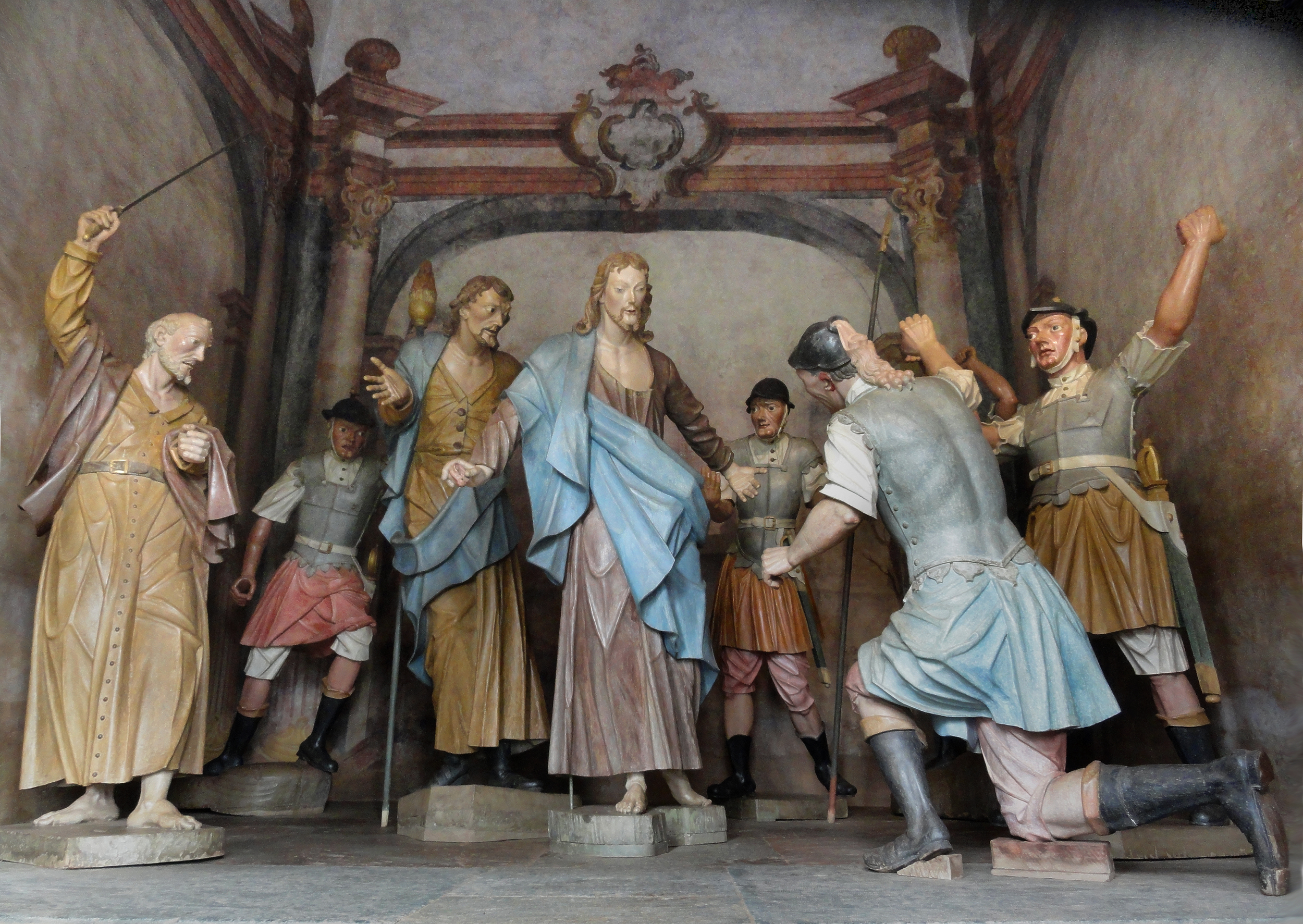
Jesus restores Malchus's ear (Prison of Jesus), Sanctuary of Congonhas

Aleijadinho's greatest achievement in full-figure sculpture are the sets at the Sanctuary of Bom Jesus de Matosinhos, in Congonhas — the 66 statues of the Via Sacra, Via Crucis or Passos da Paixão, distributed in six independent chapels, and the Twelve Prophets in the churchyard. All the scenes on the Via Sacra, carved between 1796 and 1799, are intensely dramatic, and this effect is heightened by the bright colors of the life-size statues, painted, as indicated in a contract signed in 1798 by Master Ataíde and Francisco Xavier Carneiro. However, it is not certain that Carneiro worked on the pieces, as there are no payments made to him in Book 1 of Expenses until 1837, when it ends.

The typology of the Via Sacra is old, dating back to the Sacro Monte tradition, born in Italy centuries before being re-enacted in Congonhas. The type consists of a set of scenes from the Passion of Jesus, of a theatrical and pathetic nature, explicitly intended to invoke pity and compassion, briefly reconstructing the journey of Jesus from the Last Supper to his crucifixion. The scenes are usually arranged in a series of chapels that precede a temple placed on top of a hill or mountain — hence the name Sacro Monte — exactly as is the case with the Sanctuary of Congonhas, erected by Feliciano Mendes in payment of a promise and imitating the model of the homonymous shrine in Braga, Portugal.

Julian Bell found in the Brazilian ensemble an intensity not surpassed even by the Italian models, and Mário de Andrade read it as an example of a sometimes ferocious expressionism. Gilberto Freyre and others saw in some of these plays, especially in the grotesque Roman soldiers who torment Christ, a poignant and sarcastic, albeit veiled, cry of protest against the oppression of the colony by the Portuguese government and of blacks by whites. Freyre, at the same time, identified typically folkloric roots for the constitution of his extravagant personal style, such as the satirical iconography of popular culture, marveling at the skilful way in which Aleijadinho introduced elements of the voice of the people into the universe of international Baroque high culture.

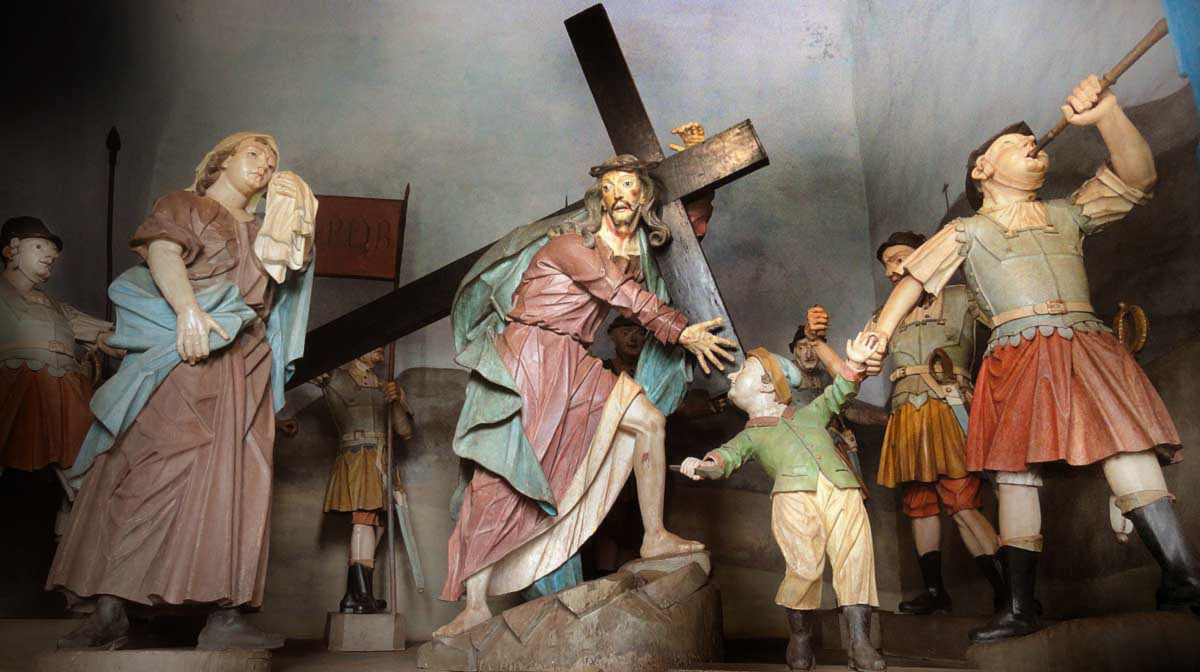
Scene from the carrying of the cross, Congonhas

By comparing the quality of the various individual figures, researchers came to the conclusion that Aleijadinho did not execute all of the Via Sacra images. His work would only be on those of the first chapel, where the Holy Supper is represented, and on those of the second chapel, featuring the Mount of Olives group. Of the other chapels, he would have personally carved only some of the figures. In the third, from the Prison, Christ and possibly Saint Peter, and in the one that contains two scenes, the Flagellation and the Crowning with Thorns, also the figures of Christ, and one of the Roman soldiers, who would have served as a model for all the others, carved by his assistants. In the chapel of Carrying of the Cross, the figure of Christ and possibly the two weeping women, together with the boy carrying a nail from the cross. In the chapel of the Crucifixion, his work would be the images of the nailed Christ and the two thieves who flanked him on Calvary, in addition, possibly, also that of Mary Magdalene.

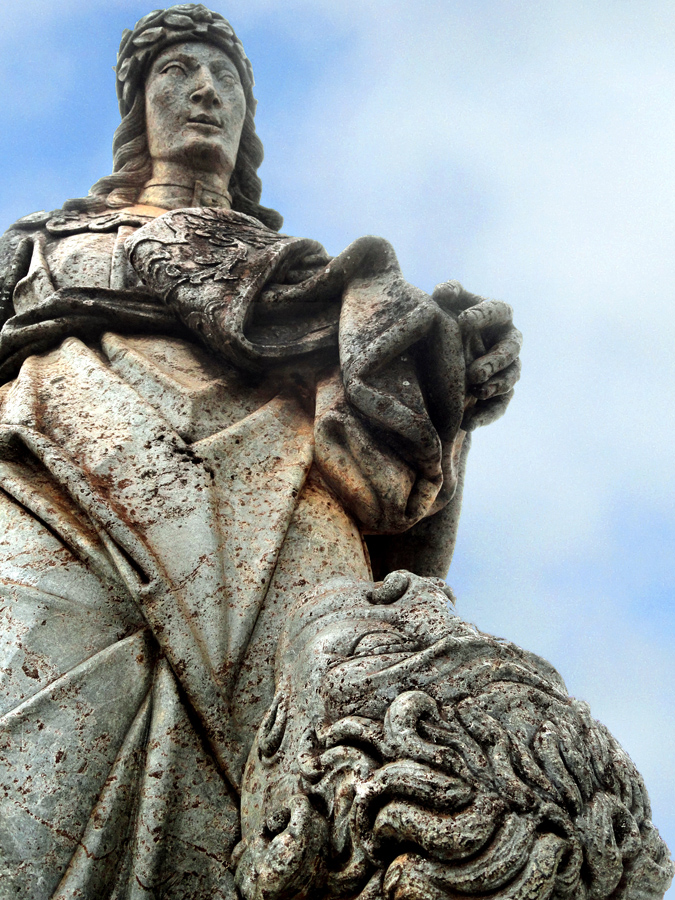
Detail of prophet Daniel

The other part of the Matosinhos set are the twelve sculptures of the prophets, made between 1800 and 1805, whose style has been a source of controversy since the manifest misunderstanding of Bernardo Guimarães in the 19th century, who, disconcerted by the apparent errors in carving and design, still recognized moments of remarkable beauty and solemnity in the statues, truly worthy of the prophets. The set is one of the most complete series representing prophets in Western Christian art. The four main prophets of the Old Testament are present — Isaiah, Jeremiah, Ezekiel and Daniel, in a prominent position in the central wing of the staircase — and eight minor prophets, chosen according to the importance established in the order of the biblical canon, namely Baruch, Hosea, Jonah, Joel, Obadiah, Amos, Nahum and Habakkuk.

The proportions of the figures are extremely distorted. Part of the critic attributes this to the incompetence of his group of assistants or the difficulties in handling the chisel generated by his illness, but others are inclined to see an expressive intentionality in them; others understand the distortions as an eminently technical resource destined to compensate for the deformation arising from the low point of view from which the statues are seen, demonstrating that the creator was aware of the problems and demands of the figural representation in perspective. In fact, the drama of the set seems to be intensified by these aberrant forms, which are presented in a varied and theatrical gesture, imbued with symbolic meanings referring to the character of the prophet in question and the content of his message. Ten of them have the same physical type: a young man with a slender face and elegant features, high cheekbones, trimmed beard and long mustache. Only Isaiah and Nahum appear as old men with long beards. All of them also wear similar tunics, decorated with embroidery, except for Amos, the shepherd-prophet, who wears a cloak similar to the sheepskin garments found among peasants in the Alentejo region. Daniel, with the lion at his feet, also stands out in the group and it is believed that, due to the perfection of its finish, it is perhaps one of the only pieces in the set entirely made by Aleijadinho. According to Soraia Silva:

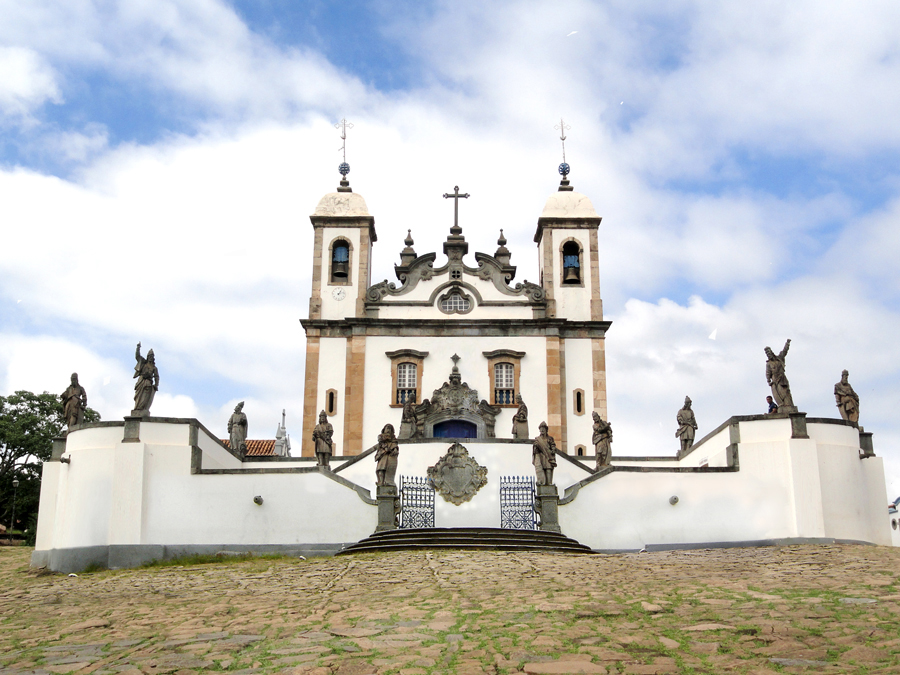
The set of prophets in the Church of Congonhas

"What Aleijadinho effectively left represented in this work was a postural dynamic of oppositions and correspondences. Each statue represents a specific character, with its own gestural speech. But despite this independence in the representative space and even in the physical space, they maintain a body dialogue, forming an integrated unit in the prophetic dance of the annunciation of life, death and rebirth".

The prophets have attracted the attention of many researchers, and several theories have been proposed to interpret them. As an example, Martin Dreher, in his book A Igreja Latino-Americana no Contexto Mundial, states that in Aleijadinho's work "the feeling of revolt against the oppressors is alive", making an association between the prophets and the political situation of Minas Gerais, at the time agitated by the Minas Gerais Conspiracy; others take this line of thought further, identifying each of the prophets with one of the conspirators, some of whom the artist seems to have known personally, and others believe that there may be hidden Masonic symbolism in the works. These theories — mainly because the period documentation about the artist is very poor, leaving room for a lot of conjecture — are far from being a consensus and circulate in a limited way among specialists, although they find an appreciable space in popular culture.

In any case, the set's conception is typical of international religious Baroque: dramatic, choreographic and eloquent. Soraia Maria Silva states that each statue represents a specific character who, despite the independence in the representative and physical space, maintain a bodily dialogue of their own. Giuseppe Ungaretti, astonished by the mystical intensity of the figures, said that "Aleijadinho's prophets are not baroque, they are biblical". Gabriel Frade thought that the set comprising the church, the large churchyard and the prophets has become one of the most known sacred architecture in Brazil, being a perfect example of how interdependent elements complement each other, crowning the entirety of the work with harmony. For John Bury:

"Aleijadinho's prophets are masterpieces, and that in three different aspects: architecturally, as a group; individually, as sculptural works, and psychologically, as a study of the characters they represent. From this last point of view, they are [.. .] the most satisfying sculptures of Old Testament characters that have ever been executed, with the exception of Michelangelo's Moses".

Today the entire set of the Sanctuary is a World Heritage Site, as declared by UNESCO, in addition to being listed by IPHAN.

==== Reliefs ====
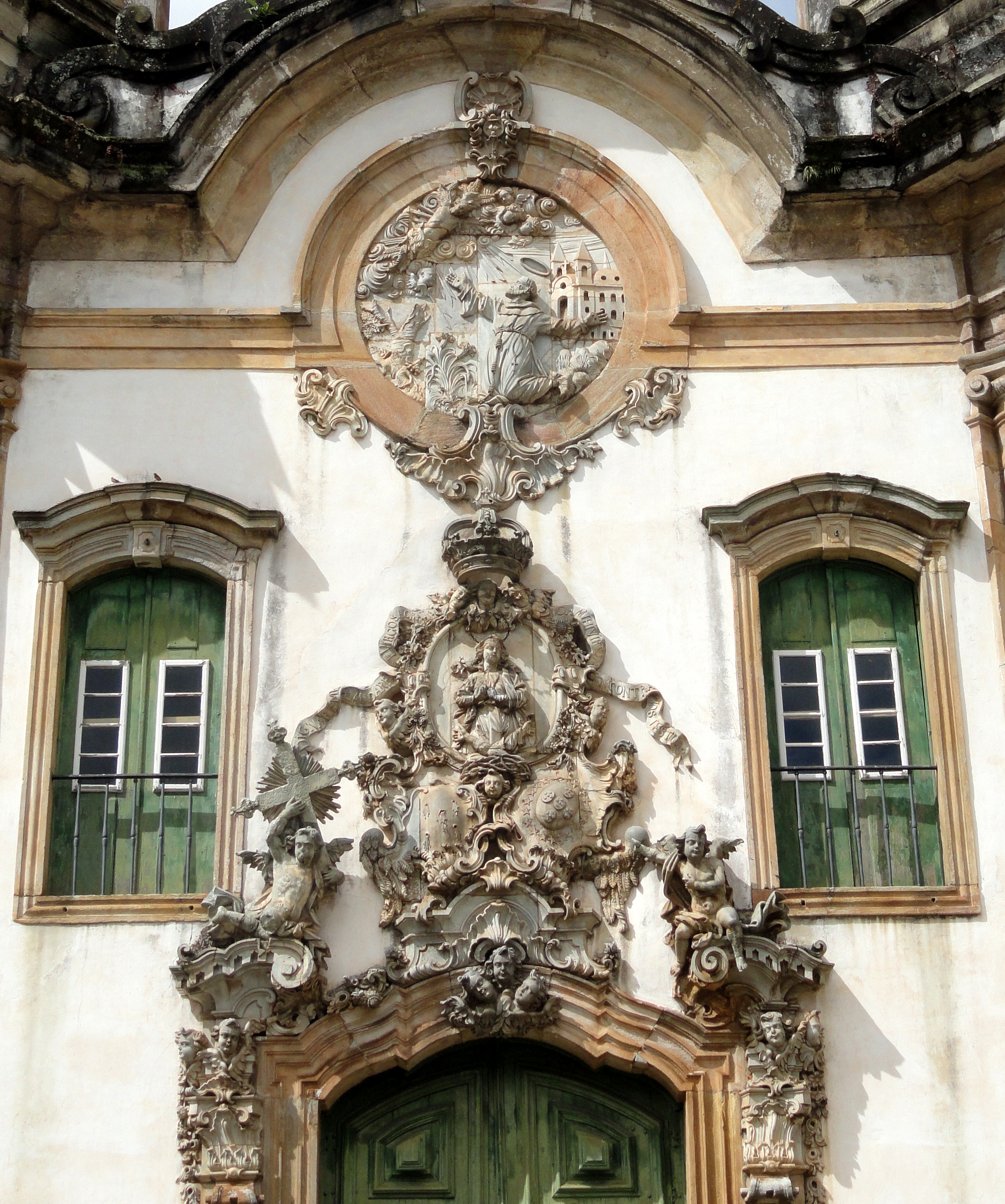
Relief on the portico of the Church of Saint Francis in Ouro Preto

Still within the field of sculpture, there are the large reliefs that Aleijadinho sculpted for church porches, which introduced a pattern of great posterity in Brazil. Typical of this innovation is the cartouche or crowned coat of arms flanked by angels, which first appeared on the door of the Church of Carmel in Sabará. Bazin related this model to Portuguese Baroque prototypes from the time of king John V, which were often used there and in Brazil for crowning altarpieces, but the repeated presence of these elements in Portuguese Carmelite churches also suggests a preference for this religious Order.

Aleijadinho transferred this model to the portals of the Franciscan churches of Ouro Preto and São João del-Rei, where the composition became much more complex and virtuosic. In Ouro Preto, the angels have two coats of arms side by side, united by Christ's crown of thorns and the stigmatized arms, symbols of the Franciscan Order, and over this a large medallion opens with the figure of the Virgin Mary, topped by a large royal crown. The set is decorated with garlands, flowers, cherub heads and ribbons with inscriptions, in addition to volutes and shell and foliage motifs. Also new are the design of the pedestals, in a semicircular arch, and the addition of fragments of entablature above the side pilasters, decorated with serrations and volutes. The same motifs appear in São João del-Rei, but all these portals were apparently modified, in their structural part, by Cerqueira. A differential of the Ouro Preto example is the presence of an additional relief occluding the oculus, where Saint Francis of Assisi appears receiving the stigmata, which for Mário de Andrade is among his most exquisite creations, combining remarkable sweetness and realism.

In the same category, the monumental washbasins and pulpits he carved in soapstone in churches in Ouro Preto and Sabará should be remembered, all with sculptural work in relief, both ornamental and in descriptive scenes.

== Critical reception ==
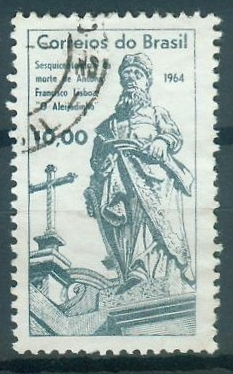
Postage stamp commemorating 150 years of Aleijadinho's death

After a period of relative obscurity after his death, even though it was commented on by several travelers and scholars of the first half of the 19th century such as Auguste de Saint-Hilaire and Richard Burton, sometimes in an unflattering way, Aleijadinho returned to scene with the pioneering biography of Bretas in 1858, already mentioned. Emperor Pedro II was an admirer of his work. But it was later that his name returned with force to the aesthetic and historical discussion, with the research of Afonso Celso and Mário de Andrade in the beginning of the 20th century, allied to the new prestige that the Minas Gerais Baroque enjoyed among the government, a prestige that led to the creation of the Inspectorate of National Monuments, IPHAN's predecessor, in 1933. For the modernists in Mário's group, who were engaged in a process of creating a new concept of national identity, knowing Aleijadinho's work was like an inspiring revelation, being accompanied by some illustrious French-speaking theorists, in a period when the Baroque style was very discredited among the intelligentsia in Europe but in Brazil it had become the subject of the moment. Admired, Blaise Cendrars intended to write a book about him, but that ended up not materializing. However, the studies were expanded in the following years by, among many others, Roger Bastide, Rodrigo Melo Franco de Andrade, Gilberto Freyre, Germain Bazin and also by IPHAN technicians, and since then they have expanded even more to address a wide variety of topics about the artist's life and work, generally stating the superlative importance of his contribution. Lúcio Costa maintained a divided position; denied him talent as an architect, and rejected his work in this field as inferior, of a decorative level only, and ironized his person too, calling him "tragic repressed", even though at another time he praised him as "the most high individualized expression of Portuguese art of its time".

His recognition goes beyond Brazil. For a good part of modern critics, Aleijadinho represents a unique moment in the evolution of Brazilian art, being a point of confluence of the various social, ethnic, artistic and cultural roots that founded the nation, and more than that, it represents a plastic expression of very high quality of this synthesis, being the first great genuinely national artist. Among many similar opinions, Bazin praised him as the "Brazilian Michelangelo", for Carlos Fuentes he was the greatest "poet" of colonial America, Lezama Lima called him "the culmination of the American Baroque", Regis St. Louis and his collaborators give him a prominent place in the history of international art, John Crow considers him one of the most gifted creators of the western hemisphere ever, and João Hansen claims that his works are already beginning to be identified with Brazil alongside samba and football in other countries, having become one of the national icons for foreigners. There is already a museum specially dedicated to the preservation of his memory, the Aleijadinho Museum, founded in Ouro Preto in 1968, and his hometown regularly promotes "Aleijadinho Week", with meetings of researchers allied to popular celebrations, where he is the main theme. The artist's prestige with specialized critics accompanies his popularity among Brazilian laypeople. In 2007, the Bank of Brazil Cultural Center (CCBB) in Rio de Janeiro held the exhibition Aleijadinho e seu Tempo — Fé, Engenho e Arte, which had a record public of 968,577 visitors, the largest public, in absolute numbers, received at an exhibition held in the CCBB Rio since its seventeen years active, surpassing figures for the São Paulo International Biennial (535,000), and for the Picasso Na Oca (905,000) and Guerreiros de Xi'an (817,782) exhibitions.

Grammont, Gomes Júnior, Chartier, Barretto and others warn against the perennialization of mystifying, romanticized and fanciful views about the Aleijadinho, which tend to obscure his correct contextualization and the clear understanding of his artistic stature and the extent of his originality, from the copious folklore that, since the Vargas Era, both the officials and the people have been creating around his little-known and mysterious figure, elevating him to the level of a national hero. Hansen even pointed out as regrettable evidence of this situation the occurrence of political manipulation of Aleijadinho's image abroad, citing government censorship of the publication of more critical studies in the catalog of a major exhibition that included the artist mounted in France, sponsored by the federal government of Brazil.

== In popular culture ==
Aleijadinho has already been portrayed as a character in cinema and television: in 1915 Guelfo Andaló directed the first biopic about the artist, in 1968 he was portrayed by Geraldo Del Rey in the film Cristo de Lama, Maurício Gonçalves in the film Aleijadinho - Paixão, Glória e Suplício (2003) and Stênio Garcia in a Special Case on TV Globo. In 1978 Aleijadinho was the subject of a documentary directed by Joaquim Pedro de Andrade and narrated by Ferreira Gullar.

== List of documented works ==
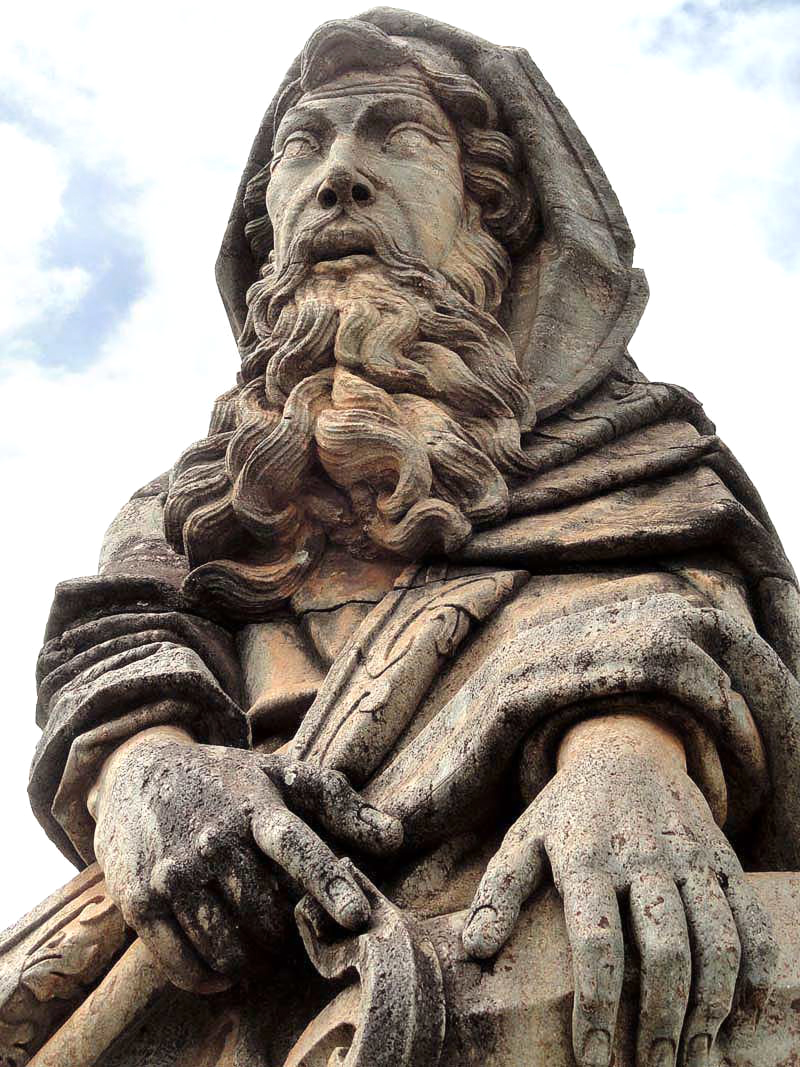
Detail of prophet Isaiah

Information obtained from an article by Felicidade Patrocínio in the Magazine of the Historical and Geographical Institute of Montes Claros.

- 1752 — Ouro Preto: Fountain of the Palace of the Governors. Project by his father, execution by Aleijadinho;
- 1757 — Ouro Preto: Alto da Cruz Fountain. Project by his father, execution by Aleijadinho;
- 1761 — Ouro Preto: Bust in the Fountain of Alto da Cruz;
- 1761 — Ouro Preto: Table and 4 benches for the Palace of the Governors;
- 1764 — Barão de Cocais: He carved the image of São João Batista in soapstone and designed the crossing arch inside the Sanctuary of São João Batista;
- 1770 — Sabará: Unspecified work for the Church of Our Lady of Carmel;
- 1771 — Rio Pomba: Measurement of the project for the main altar of the Mother Church;
- 1771–2 — Ouro Preto: Project of the main altar of the Church of São José;
- 1771 — Ouro Preto: Measurement of the project for the Church of Our Lady of Carnel;
- 1771 — Ouro Preto: Project for a butcher shop;
- 1771–2 — Ouro Preto: Pulpits for the Church of Saint Francis;
- 1773–4 — Ouro Preto: Cap of the chancel of the Church of Saint Francis;
- 1774 — São João del-Rei: Approval of the design of the Church of Saint Francis;
- 1774 — Sabará: Unspecified work for the Church of Our Lady of Carmel;
- 1774 — Ouro Preto: New design of the doorway of the Church of Saint Francis;
- 1775 — Ouro Preto: Design of the chancel and altar of the Church of Our Lady of Sorrows;
- 1777–8 — Ouro Preto: Inspection of works at the Church of Our Lady of Sorrows;
- 1778 — Sabará: Inspection of works at the Church of Our Lady of Carmel;
- 1778–9 — Ouro Preto: Design of the main altar of the Church of Saint Francis.
- 1779 — Sabará: Design of the railing and a statue for the Church of Our Lady of Carmel;
- 1781 — Sabará: Unspecified work for the Church of Our Lady of Carmel;
- 1781 — São João del-Rei: Commission for the design of the main altar of the Church of Saint Francis;
- 1781–2 — Sabará: Railing, pulpits, choir and main doors of the Church of Our Lady of Carmel;
- 1785 — Morro Grande: Inspection of works in the mother church;
- 1789 — Ouro Preto: Ara stones for the Church of Saint Francis;
- 1790 — Mariana: Registration of the second councilor in the Town Hall;
- 1790–4 — Ouro Preto: Main altar of the Church of Saint Francis;
- 1794 — Ouro Preto: Inspection of works in the Church of Saint Francis;
- 1796–9 — Congonhas: Figures of the Passos da Paixão for the Sanctuary of Bom Jesus de Matosinhos;
- 1799 — Ouro Preto: Four angels on a litter for the Church of Our Lady of Pilar;
- 1800–5 — Congonhas: Twelve Prophets for the churchyard of the Sanctuary of Bom Jesus de Matosinhos;
- 1801–6 — Congonhas: Lamps for the Sanctuary of Bom Jesus de Matosinhos;
- 1804 — Congonhas: Organ box of the Sanctuary of Bom Jesus de Matosinhos;
- 1806 — Sabará: Design of the main altar (not accepted) for the Church of Our Lady of Carmel;
- 1807 — Ouro Preto: Altarpieces of Saint John and Our Lady of Sorrows for the Church of Our Lady of Carmel;
- 1808 — Congonhas: Candlesticks for the Sanctuary of Bom Jesus de Matosinhos;
- 1808–9 — Ouro Preto: Altarpieces of Saint Quiteria and Saint Lucy for the Church of Our Lady of Carmel;
- 1810 — São João del-Rei: Design of the frontispiece and railing for the mother church;
- 1829 — Ouro Preto: Lateral altarpieces for the Church of Saint Francis, executed posthumously.

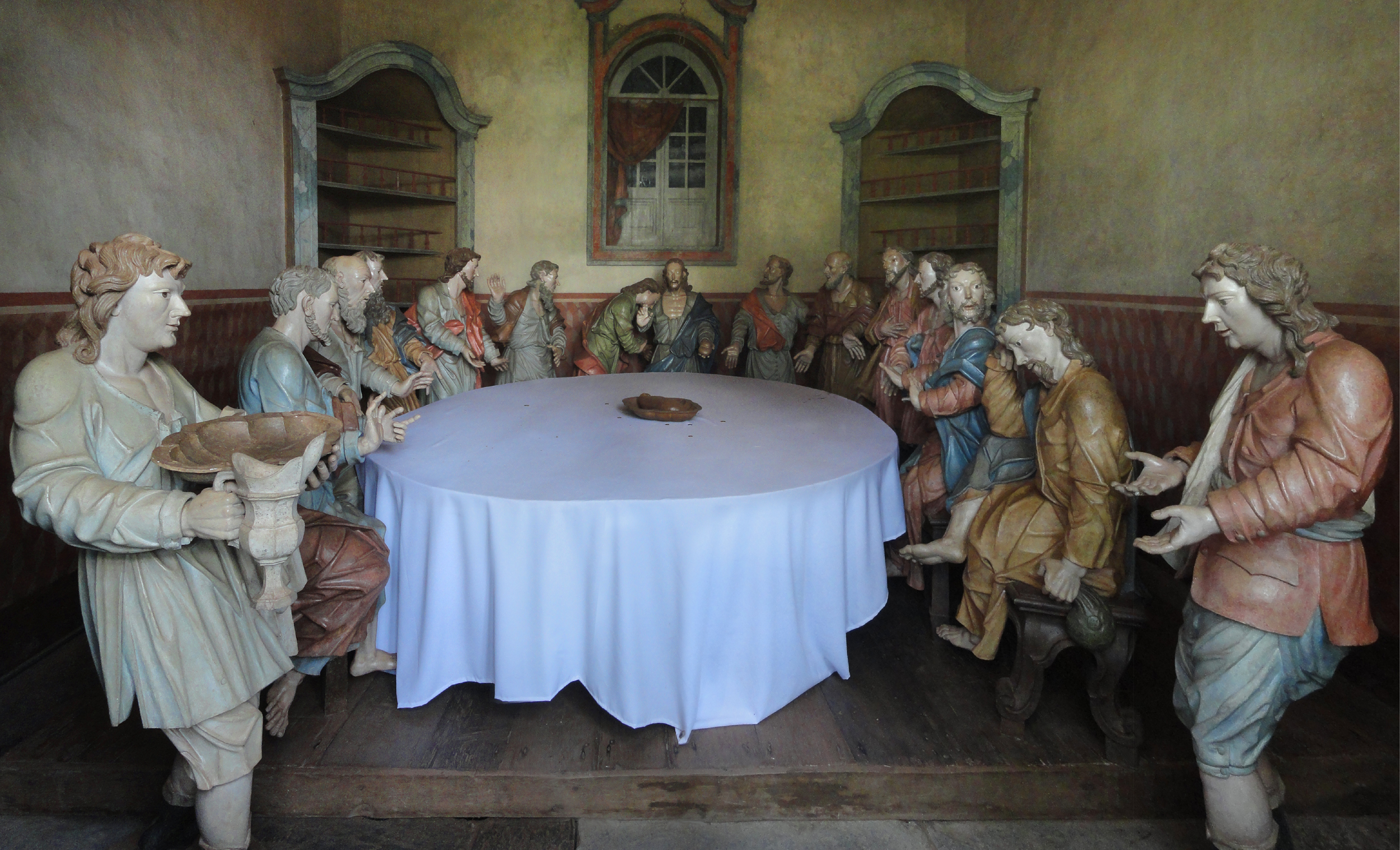
The last supper, Sanctuary of Congonhas
