= Mother Church of Saint Anthony =

- Igreja Matriz de Santo Antônio
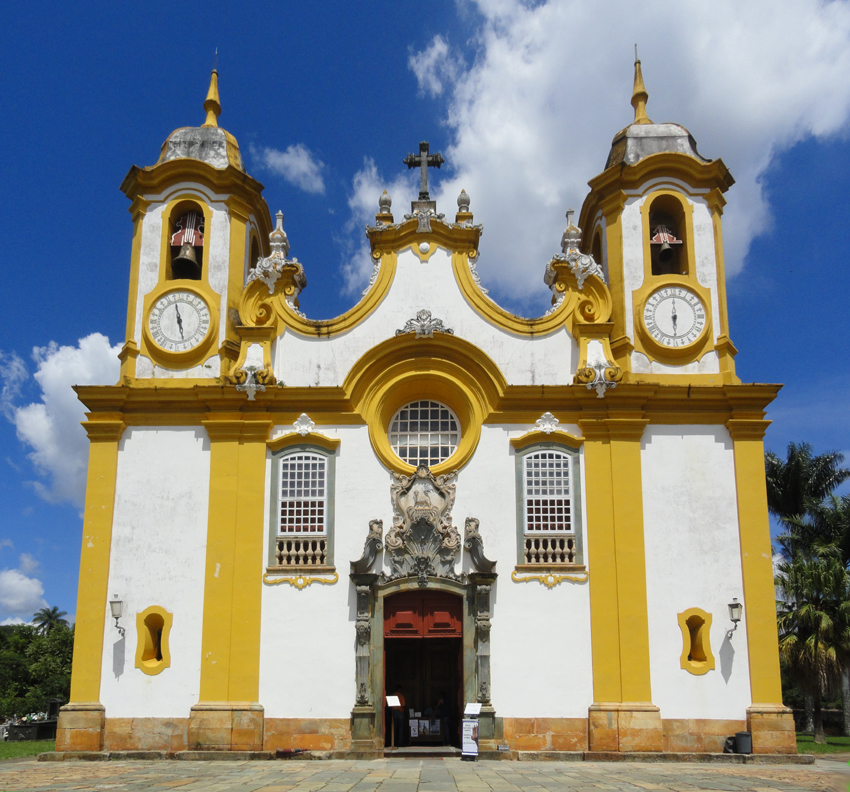
- Mother Church of Saint Anthony
- 21.11028°S 44.17829°W
- Location: Tiradentes, Minas Gerais
- Country: Brazil
- Denomination: Roman Catholic Church

Architecture
- Architect(s): Aleijadinho and others
- Style: Baroque, rococo
- Years built: 1710-1810

Administration
- Diocese: São João del Rei

National Historic Heritage of Brazil
- Designated: 1949
- Reference no.: 329

The Mother Church of Saint Anthony (Portuguese: Igreja Matriz de Santo Antônio) is a Roman Catholic church located in Tiradentes, Minas Gerais, Brazil. It is considered one of the masterpieces of Baroque architecture in Minas Gerais.

== History ==
The church was built on the site of a small chapel used by the Bandeirantes in the early 18th century. Construction of the current building began in 1710, after the establishment of the Brotherhood of the Blessed Sacrament, although records were lost from this early period. By 1732, the structure was largely complete, and further expansions and embellishments continued over the course of the 18th century.

The village of São José do Rio das Mortes, where the church is located, was an important center for the Inconfidência Mineira movement in the late 18th century. Several prominent inconfidentes came from the area, including Joaquim José da Silva Xavier, known as Tiradentes. After Brazil's independence, the town was renamed Tiradentes in his honor.

The ornate rococo facade was designed by the sculptor Aleijadinho and added between 1807 and 1810, along with the stone stairway and forecourt. The church underwent restorations in 1893, 1946, 1960, 1973, 1980, and 1982.

== Original chapel ==
According to local historians, the first chapel on the site was built around 1702 by settlers from São Paulo after the discovery of gold in the area. It had a simple wooden structure and was dedicated to Saint Anthony. The chapel served as the first parish in the Rio das Mortes region.

== Construction ==
The construction of the current masonry church began around 1710 under the sponsorship of the Brotherhood of the Blessed Sacrament. Much of the early history is uncertain due to the loss of the brotherhood's records from this period. The walls were built using the traditional wattle and daub technique with wooden frames filled with adobe. The nave and chancel were erected first in this early phase.

By 1732, the basic structure was largely complete. The brotherhood petitioned the Portuguese Crown that year for funds to finish construction, including the roof, tilework, and retables. Further expansions and additions continued over the course of the century. The sacristy was added on the right side, followed by the consistory of the Brotherhood of the Blessed Sacrament on the left side. Smaller rooms for other brotherhoods were built along the nave. The back of the chancel was expanded around 1743 to accommodate the tribune.

== 18th Century Interior ==
The elaborate wood carvings of the chancel were undertaken from 1739-1750 under a contract with the Portuguese artist João Ferreira Sampaio. He oversaw the carving of the altarpiece, walls, crossing, and tribune throne in the ornate Joanine style.

The ceiling and tribune paintings are attributed to Minas Gerais artist Antônio de Caldas and were executed around 1750-1751. They feature colorful grotesque motifs and golden ferroneries.

The nave retables and statuary were produced by various artists during the middle decades of the 18th century. The inlaid wood flooring was added in 1774 by Manoel José de Oliveira.

An elaborate Rococo pipe organ was acquired from Portugal and installed around 1788, with decorative paintings by Manuel Vítor de Jesus.

== Facade by Aleijadinho ==
The ornate facade and twin bell towers were designed by the renowned sculptor Antônio Francisco Lisboa, better known as Aleijadinho. Construction occurred between 1807-1810. Aleijadinho introduced Gothic and Rococo elements, while integrating the new facade with the earlier structure. The facade was executed in brick rather than Aleijadinho's preferred soapstone. It features a central portal flanked by two towers with bell chambers. The pediment above contains Aleijadinho's characteristic curvilinear volutes ascending to an arched acroterium capped by a stone cross. Flaming finials at the pediment corners are representative of Aleijadinho's style.

== Later History ==
Additional renovations were undertaken in the late 19th and 20th centuries. The town of São José del Rei was renamed Tiradentes in honor of the inconfidente martyr in 1889 after the proclamation of the Brazilian Republic.

The church underwent restoration campaigns in 1893, 1946, 1960, 1973, 1980, and 1982 under the auspices of the National Institute of Historic and Artistic Heritage.

== Architectural features ==
The church has a rectangular plan consisting of a long nave leading to a shorter chancel. The nave has a coffered ceiling with richly decorated panels painted in gold leaf and tempera. Six large oculi provide natural lighting. Baroquely carved retables line the side walls.

The intricately carved and gilded chancel contrasts with the simpler nave. The walls and vaulted ceiling are covered in twisting Solomonic columns, garlands, shells, volutes and other ornate Joanine motifs.

Notable features include:

- Choir stalls with spiral columns, carved by Pedro Monteiro de Souza circa 1740.
- An 18th century pipe organ acquired from Portugal with Rococo cabinetry and decorative painting.
- Inlaid wood flooring from 1774 with numbered burial plots.
- An elegant wood balustrade by Salvador de Oliveira, circa 1780.
- Large silver oil lamp crafted in Rio de Janeiro, weighing 55 kg.
- Collection of Baroque statuary, silver, and liturgical objects.

The adjacent church complex includes an old sacristy, consistories, and 18th century bell towers on the facade. The forecourt contains an elegant sundial carved from soapstone in 1785.

== Significance ==
The Mother Church of Saint Anthony is considered one of the foremost examples of Portuguese colonial Baroque architecture and decorative arts in Brazil. Its elaborate Rococo interior and Aleijadinho's facade showcase the splendor of 18th century Minas Gerais.

The church was designated a national historic landmark by IPHAN in 1949. Its collections were also named national heritage in 1985. The 18th century pipe organ is considered unique in the world.

== Gallery ==
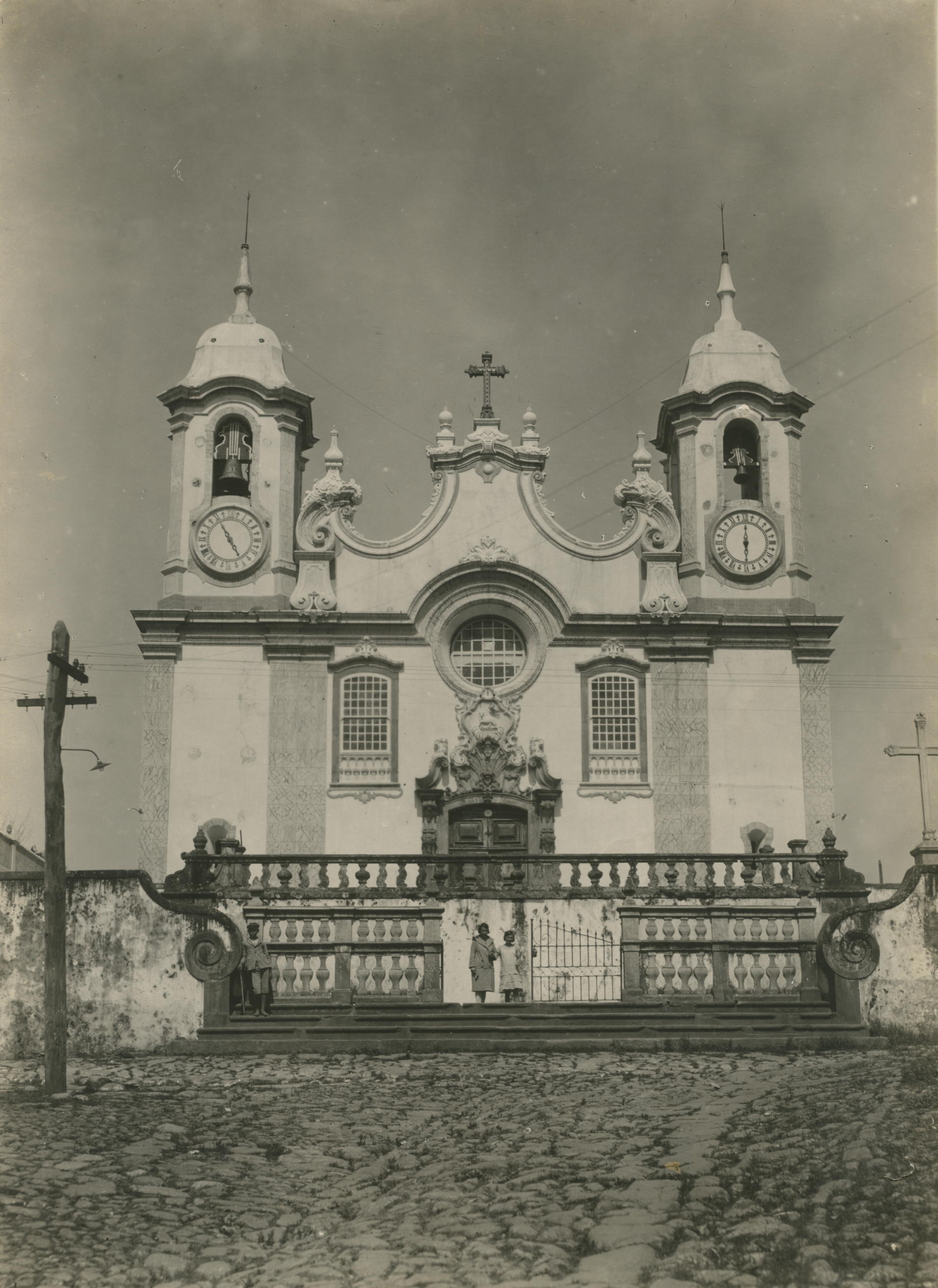
The church's main façade in 1950.

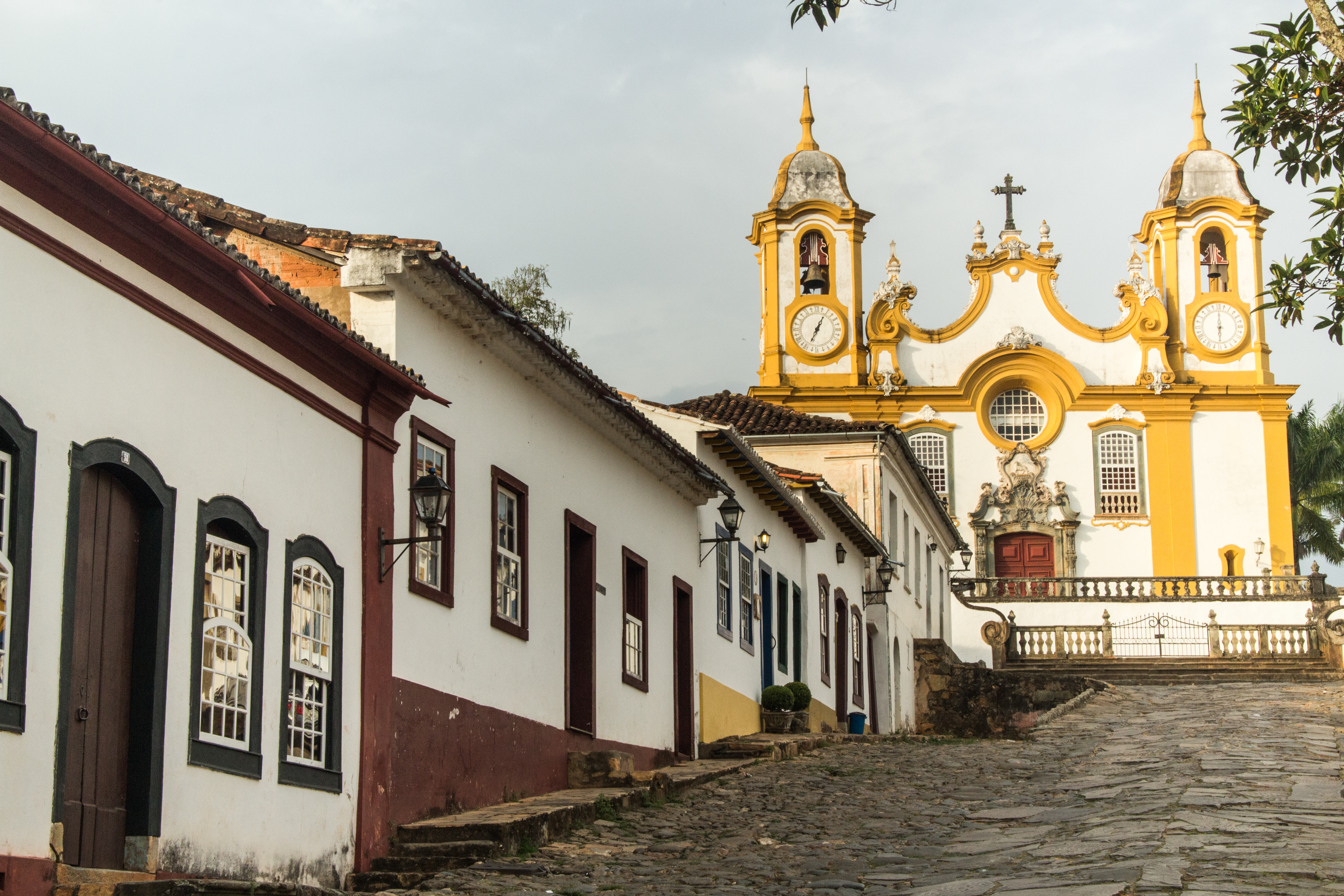
A view of the street leading up to the church.

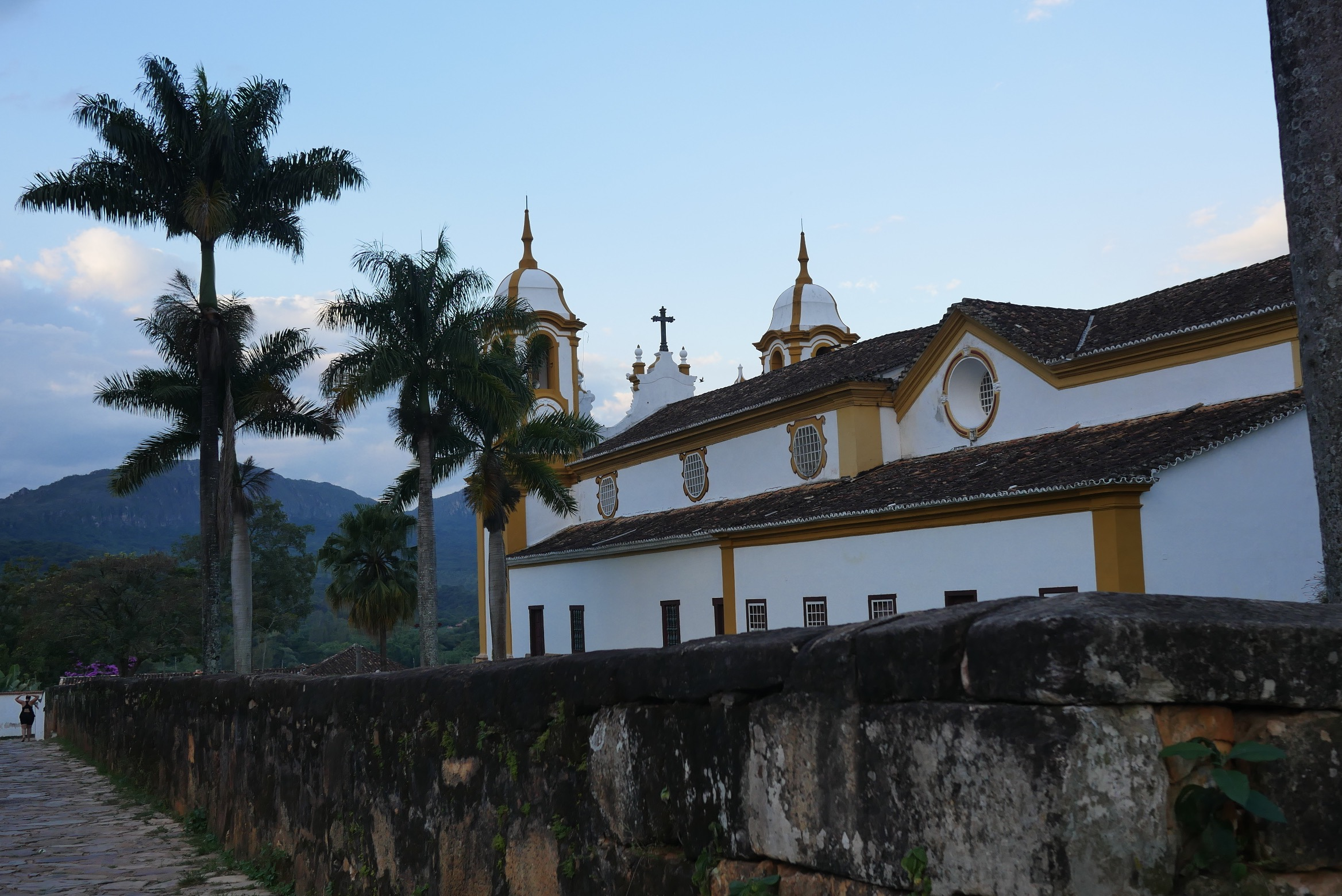
The church viewed from one side.

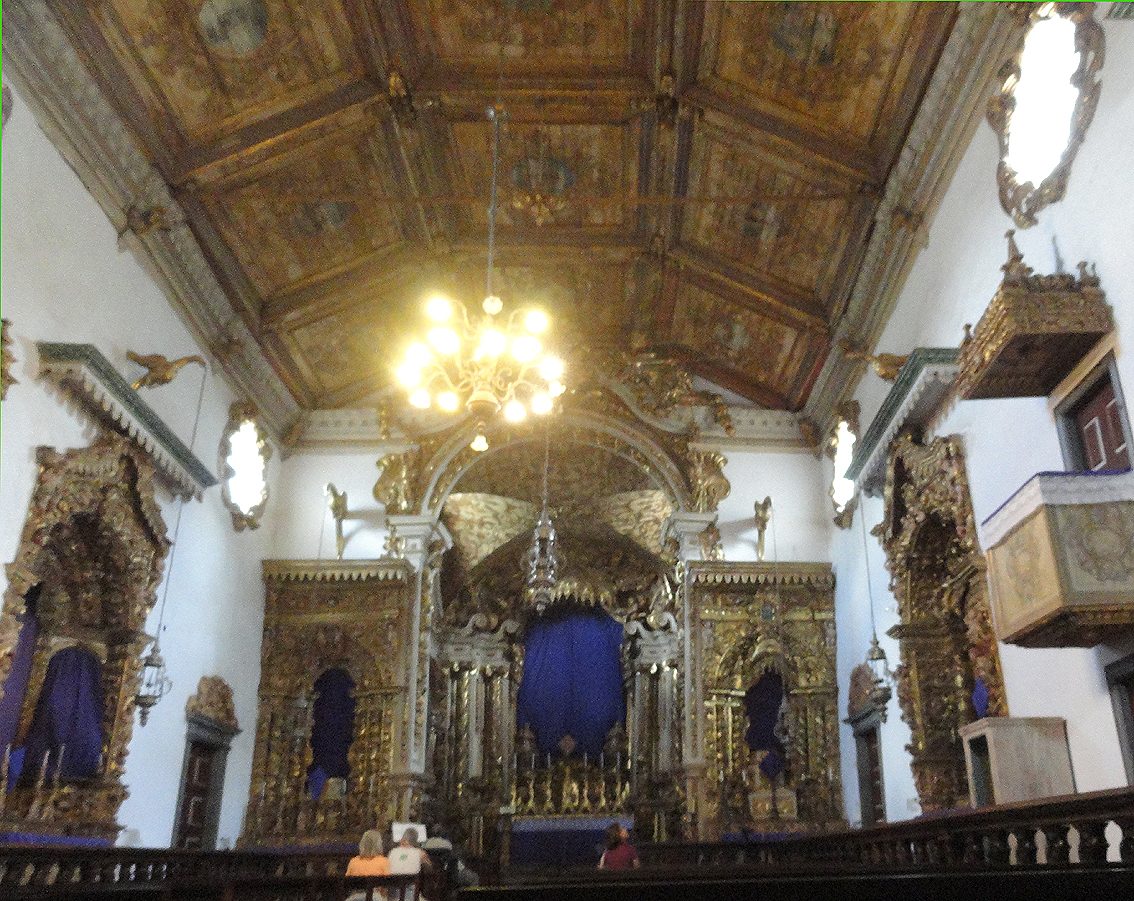
An interior view towards the altar.

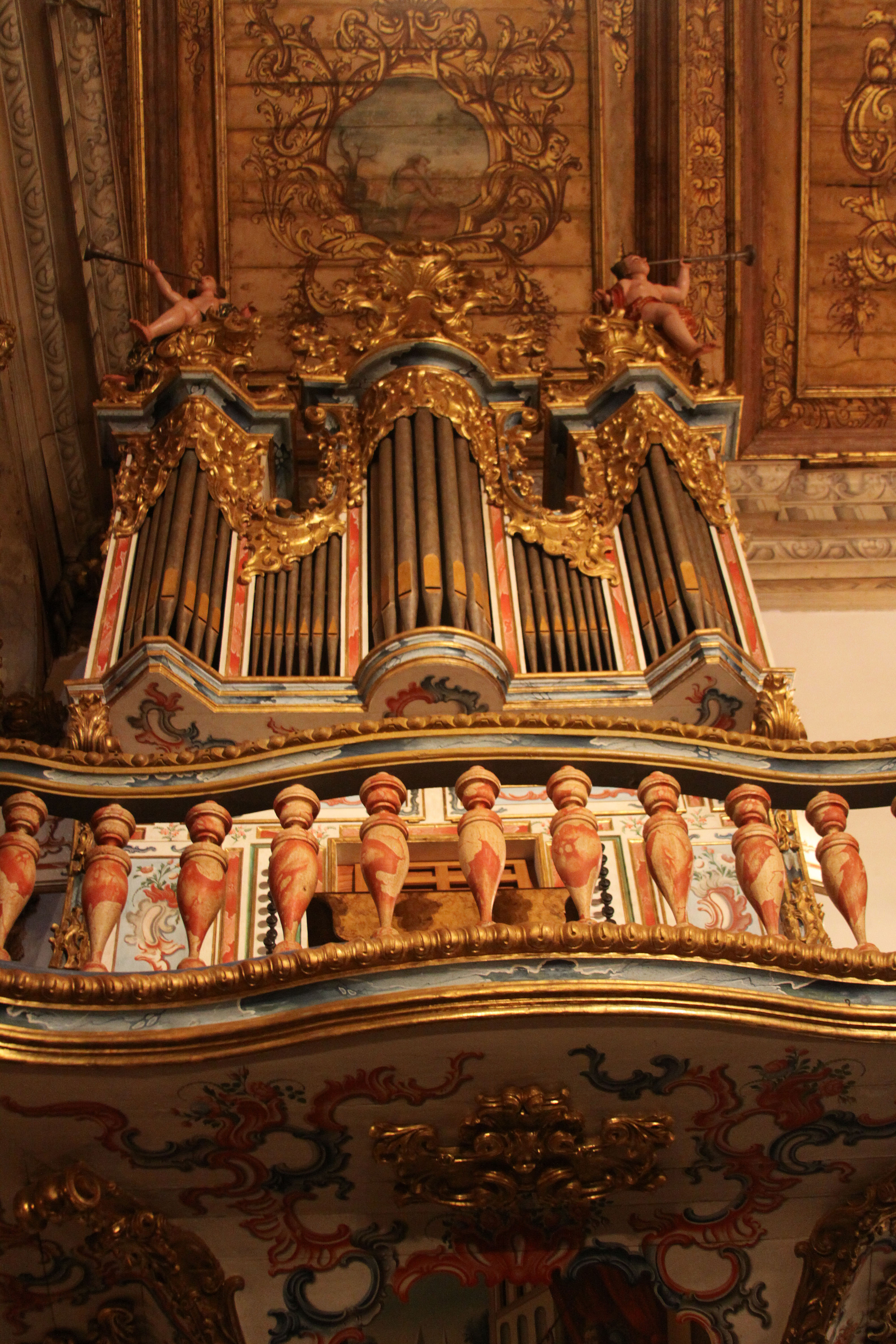
The church's organ.
