= National Institute of Historic and Artistic Heritage =

Heritage register of the federal government of Brazil

National Historic and Artistic Heritage Institute
- Instituto do Patrimônio Histórico e Artístico Nacional
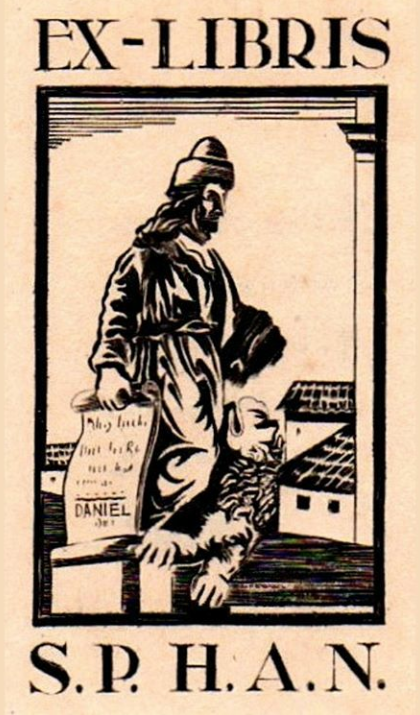

Agency overview
- Formed: July 14, 1934
- Agency executive: Leandro Grass, President
- Parent agency: Ministry of Culture
- Website: www.gov.br/iphan/

The National Historic and Artistic Heritage Institute (Portuguese: Instituto do Patrimônio Histórico e Artístico Nacional, IPHAN) is a heritage register of the federal government of Brazil. It is responsible for the preservation of buildings, monuments, structures, objects and sites, as well as the register and safeguard of intangible cultural heritage deemed of historic or cultural importance to the country.

IPHAN maintains 1,047 sites, which include historic buildings, city centers, and landscapes. It additionally lists a growing number of intangible cultural heritage entities.

The presidency of the institute was held by only two individuals over its first forty years. Rodrigo Melo Franco led SPHAN/IPHAN from 1937 until his retirement in 1967; his successor was the architect Renato Soeiro, who led the institute from 1967 to 1979.

== History ==
=== Inspetoria de Monumentos Nacionais ===
The federal agency dedicated to the preservation of historic sites in Brazil was created in 1933 under the name Inspetoria de Monumentos Nacionais (IMN). It was established as a unit linked to the National Historical Museum (NHM). IMN was established by Federal Decree No. 24,735 of July 14, 1934. Its main purpose was to prevent the export of historic objects from Brazil to the international antiquities trade and the demolition of buildings and monuments as part of the rapid urban reforms in Brazil during the early 20th century.

=== Serviço do Patrimônio Histórico e Artístico Nacional ===
The Serviço do Patrimônio Histórico e Artístico Nacional (SPHAN) was established in 1937 and replace to IMN; it was linked to the Ministry of Education and Health. SPHAN was established through Article no. 378 of the "Estado Novo" Constitution of 1937) by Getúlio Vargas, President of the Republic. The establishment of SPHAN was led by Education Minister Gustavo Capanema and a team which included the poet Mário de Andrade. The team, together with the lawyer Rodrigo Melo Franco, undertook a project to research and catalog a large number of historic sites across Brazil. Rodrigo Melo Franco would lead the institute from

=== Instituto do Patrimônio Histórico e Artístico Nacional ===
SPHAN was replaced by the National Historical and Artistic Heritage Institute (IPHAN) in 1970. It again underwent various name changes again in 1979; the name IPHAN was reinstated in 1994.

== Chronology ==
- 1936—Provisional creation of the Serviço do Patrimônio Histórico e Artístico Nacional (SPHAN)
- 1937—SPHAN established under Article no. 378 of the Constitution of 1937
- 1946—SPHAN became Departamento do Patrimônio Histórico e Artístico Nacional (DPHAN)
- 1970—DPHAN became Instituto do Patrimônio Histórico e Artístico Nacional (IPHAN)
- 1979—IPHAN is divided into SPHAN and the Fundação Nacional Pró-Memória (FNPN)
- 1990—SPHAN and FNPM were merged to become the Instituto Brasileiro do Patrimônio Cultural (IBPC)
- 1994—IBPC became the Instituto do Patrimônio Histórico e Artístico Nacional (IPHAN)

== Categories ==
Entities listed by IPHAN are organized under the Livros do Tombo, which includes the:

- Livro do Tombo Arqueológico, Etnográfico e Paisagístico: includes cultural objects and practices of archaeological, ethnographic value; landscapes, city centers, and architectural complexes are included in this category.
- Livro do Tombo Histórico: includes cultural objects of historical value, such as buildings, landmarks, individuals images, and paintings.
- Livro do Tombo das Belas Artes: includes cultural objects of artistic value, generally the fine arts of "non-utilitarian character".
- Livro do Tombo das Artes Aplicadas: include cultural objects associated with a "utilitarian function" as opposed to those of the fine arts; the category includes the decorative arts, graphic arts and furniture.

== See also ==
- List of National Historic Heritage of Brazil
- List of IPHAN heritage sites in the North of Brazil
