= Rodrigo Melo Franco =

Brazilian art historian (1898–1969)

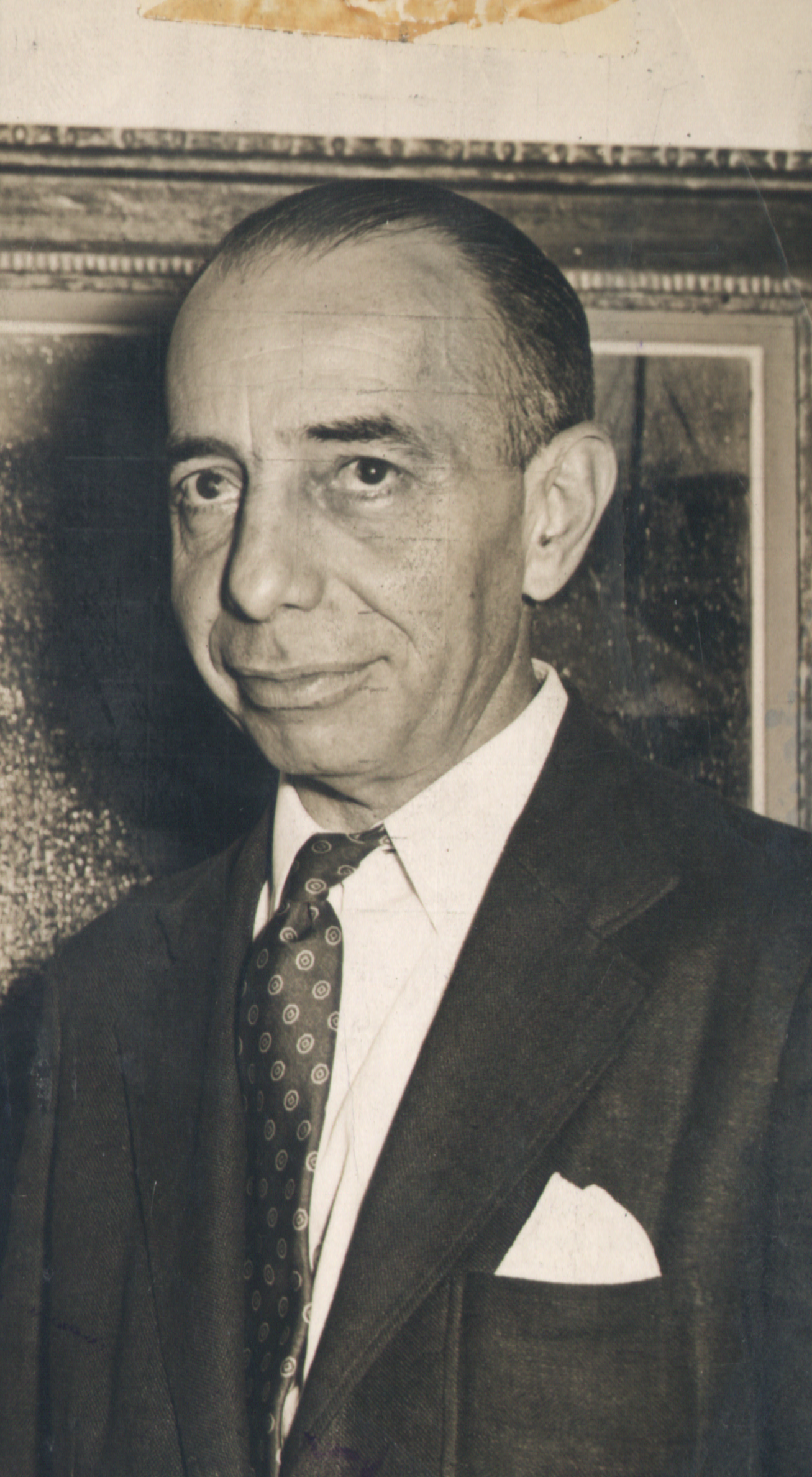
- Born: 17 August 1898; Belo Horizonte, Minas Gerais, Brazil
- Died: 11 May 1969 (aged 70); Rio de Janeiro, Guanabara, Brazil
- Writing career
- Movement: Modernism

Signature
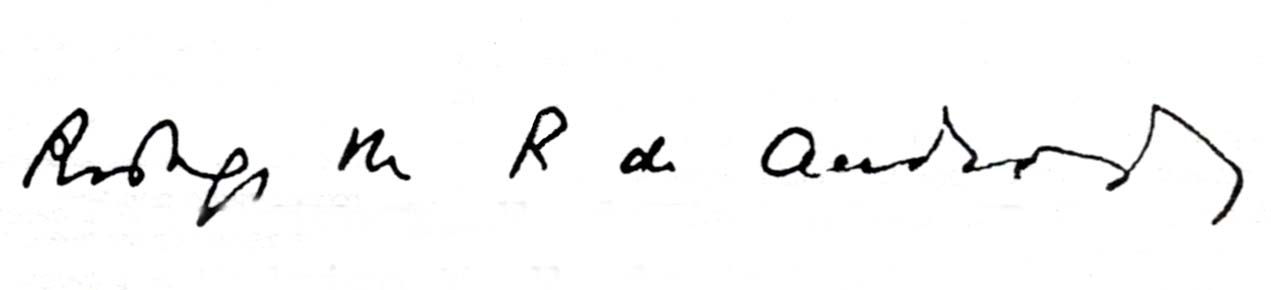

Rodrigo Melo Franco de Andrade (1898–1969) was a Brazilian lawyer, art critic and historian. He served as director of preservation of artistic heritage of Brazil at the Ministry of Education. He is credited, among many similar discoveries, with reviving interest in Antônio Francisco Lisboa. He is the author of Monumentos Históricos y Arqueológicos de Brasil (Mexico, 1952).
