= Belmonte (cartoonist) =

Brazilian artist

- Born: May 15, 1896; São Paulo
- Died: April 19, 1947 (aged 50); São Paulo

Belmonte, the pseudonym of Benedito Carneiro Bastos Barreto (May 15, 1896 – April 19, 1947), was a Brazilian caricaturist, painter, illustrator, cartoonist, journalist and historian, who began his career in 1912.

Without a doubt the greatest figure in caricature in São Paulo in the first half of the twentieth century, Belmonte is best remembered today as the creator of the most popular character in the São Paulo press at that time, Juca Pato.

In 1936, Belmonte's political cartoons with Juca Pato started to appear in the newspaper Folha da Manhã, beginning a long series (lasting until 1946) about World War II (1939–1945).

Belmonte died of tuberculosis at São Lucas Hospital in São Paulo on April 19, 1947, aged 50.
