= Friedrich von Weech =

German historian and archivist (1837-1905)

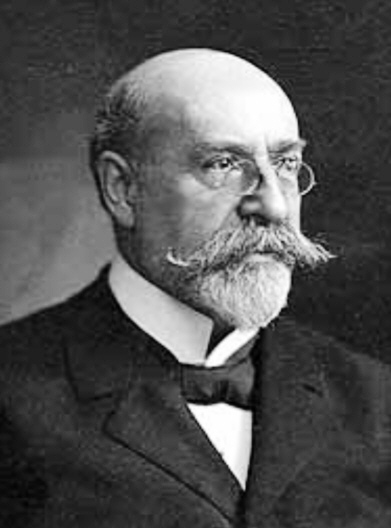
- Friedrich von Weech
- Born: Friedrich Otto Aristides von Weech; 16 October 1837; Munich, Bavaria
- Died: 17 November 1905 (aged 68); Karlsruhe, Baden, Germany
- Occupations: Historian; Archivist
- Spouse: Therese Seuffert (1842-1900)
- Children: Auguste Therese Klemetine Caecilia von Weech (1866-1900); Johanna Beate Philippine von Weech (born 1869); Gabriele Maria Margareta von Weech (1871-1921)

Friedrich von Weech (16 October 1837 – 17 November 1905) was a German historian and archivist.

== Biography ==
Friedrich Otto Aristides von Weech was born in Munich. By this time his father, the army officer Friedrich Joseph von Weech (1794-1837), had died in Athens during the summer, while serving in the army of young King Otto. The boy attended school in Munich, then spending several years taught by monks at Metten Abbey in Lower Bavaria, before returning to Munich where he spent the final two years of his schooling at the prestigious Maximilian Gymnasium Munich (secondary school). He attended the Ludwig-Maximilians-Universität München (1856) and, for a couple of terms, Heidelberg University (1857). He received his doctorate from the Ludwig-Maximilians-Universität München in June 1860. His doctoral dissertation was entitled "Kaiser Ludwig der Bayer und König Johann von Böhmen, mit Urkundlichen Beiträgen" ("Emperor Ludwig the Bavarian and King John of Bohemia, [illustrated] with original sources".

After this the young doctor joined Karl von Hegel's, team working on the (ultimately) 27 volume compilation, "Die Chroniken der deutschen Städte" ("The Chronicles of the German cities"), under the auspices of the Historische Kommission bei der Bayerischen Akademie der Wissenschaften (Historical Commission of the Bavarian Academy of Sciences). Von Weech applied himself to the second volume, working on the fifteenth century reports by Erhart Schürstab ("Kriegsbericht und Ordnung") concerning Nuremberg's war against Albrecht Achilles, Margrave of Brandenburg during 1449 and 1450. He also made other albeit lesser contributions to the compilation. After this he decided to switch from authorship to a university based academic career, and made plans to move to University of Tübingen, but in the end he moved instead to University of Freiburg, where he may have had his eye on a still unfilled teaching chair. He received his habilitation (higher academic qualification) from Freiburg in April 1862 for work "On the character and politics of Emperor Maximilian I".

His contribution at Freiburg was energetic, and he also took part in public life more widely. During 1863 Freiburg followed the example of other German towns and cities in setting up its own committee to consider the Schleswig-Holstein Question. As secretary to the committee in Freiburg von Weech convened and chaired a large meeting of the city folk on 29 November 1863, also producing leaflets in support of the "patriotic" view of "The Question". Germany had a vigorous regional press at the time, and during the early 1860s von Weech embarked on a part-time parallel career as a part-time journalist. Articles that he wrote on political and literary issues were printed by newspapers published in Augsburg, Munich, Cologne and Karlsruhe. It is possible that it was on account of his resulting high-profile that at the end of 1864 he was able to accept a job offer from the Royal National Library in Karlsruhe as court librarian. He retained this post till 1867, but continued to work in Karlsruhe for the rest of his life. There is a suggestion that having now made his mark with the royal court of Baden, he hoped to move on to a career in the diplomatic service, but this came to nothing.

The year after taking the librarianship, 1865, he married Therese Seuffert, to whom he had been engaged since 1862. She was the daughter of the late Munich based jurist and writer Josef Adam Seuffert. The marriage would produce three recorded daughters.

In 1867, he transferred to the national archives department, as Archivrat (Senior Archivist) in succession to Joseph Bader. He was promoted to the top job - Director of the National Archive - in 1885. He was still in post twenty years later when he fell ill and died. The second half of the nineteenth century saw massive investment in museums and libraries, reflecting rapid growth in middle class wealth and a surge in national consciousness and education investment across Europe. During von Weech's time in office the Generallandesarchiv Karlsruhe (National Archive in Karlsruhe) was raised to the status of an Academic Institution. A new prestigious building (see Verwaltungsgericht Karlsruhe), alongside the "Hildapromenade", set new standards. In 1888 he was appointed a member of the city's recently established "City Archives Commission" ("städtische Archivkommission"), and it was on behalf of the commission that between 1895 and 1904 he published a three volume history of the city, in the process cementing his reputation as a formidable historian of the region.

== Honours ==
Titles awarded to Friedrich von Weech included "Gentleman of the Chamber of the Grand Duchy of Baden" ("Großherzoglich Badischer Kammerherrn") and "Privy Councillor" ("Geheimrat"). In 1872 he was a recipient of the newly created "Order of Olga" (Württemberg).

In 1960 the street "Weechstraße" in Karlsruhe's new "East City" development was named after him.

== Published output (selection) ==
- Baden unter den Großherzögen Karl Friedrich, Karl, Ludwig 1738–1830. Freiburg 1864
- Korrespondenzen und Aktenstücke zur Geschichte der Ministerkonferenzen von Karlsbad und Wien 1819–20 und 1834. Leipzig 1865
- Geschichte der badischen Verfassung. Karlsruhe 1868
- Baden in den Jahren 1852 bis 1877. 1877, in 102.000 Exemplaren, aus Anlass des Regierungsjubiläums des Großherzogs von Baden
- „Aus alter und neuer Zeit“, Nachträge und Aufsätze. Leipzig 1878
- Die Deutschen seit der Reformation. 1878
- Die Zähringer in Baden. Karlsruhe 1881
- Karl Friedrich von Baden, from the papers of R. F. Nebenius. Karlsruhe 1868
- Beschreibung des schwedischen Kriegs von Sebastian Burster, 1630–1647 (Leipzig 1875)
- Badische Biographien: Heidelberg 1875, a collection in two volumes.; Nachtrag 1881 (), später von anderen Hrsg. fortgeführt
- „Codex diplomaticus Salemitanus“ Urkundenbuch der Cistercienser-Abtei Salem (1134–1498). 3 vols. Karlsruhe 1883–1895
- Siegel und Urkunden aus dem badischen Generallandesarchiv. Frankfurt 1883–1886
- Regesten zur Geschichte der Bischöfe von Konstanz. Innsbruck 1886 ff.
- Karlsruhe. Geschichte der Stadt und ihrer Verwaltung. 3 vols, Karlsruhe 1895–1904 ()
- From 1868 von Weech was also co-producer of the Zeitschrift für die Geschichte des Oberrheins.
