= Redtenbacher =

Redtenbacher may refer to:

- Ferdinand Redtenbacher (1809–1863), Austrian founder of science-based mechanical engineering
- Josef Redtenbacher (chemist) (1810–1870), Austrian chemist
- Josef Redtenbacher (entomologist) (1856–1926), Austrian entomologist
- Ludwig Redtenbacher (1814–1876), Austrian doctor and entomologist mainly interested in beetles

== See also ==
- Orville Redenbacher (1907–1995), American businessman
