= Karlsruhe Institute of Technology =

Public university in Karlsruhe, Germany

- Karlsruher Institut für Technologie
- Motto: KIT – Die Universität in der Helmholtz-Gemeinschaft
- Motto in English: KIT – The University in the Helmholtz Association
- Type: Public
- Established: Fridericiana Polytechnic: 7 October 1825; 201 years ago University of Karlsruhe (TH): 1865; KIT: 1 October 2009
- Academic affiliations: DFG, FGU, German Universities Excellence Initiative, CLUSTER; CESAER, ENTREE, TU9, TPC, EUA, EUCOR, Helmholtz Association, Erasmus
- Budget: EUR 1.163 billion (2023)
- Chairperson: Michael Kaschke
- President: Jan S. Hesthaven
- Academic staff: 414 professors 5,409 (other academic staff) (2023)
- Administrative staff: 4,211 (2023)
- Students: 22,816 (2023)
- Undergraduates: 12,434 (2023)
- Postgraduates: 8,042 (2023)
- Doctoral students: 950 (2023)
- Location: Karlsruhe, Baden-Württemberg, Germany; 49°00′34″N 8°24′42″E
- Campus: Urban/Suburban
- Colors: Green, blue, and black
- Website: kit.edu
- Location within Germany Location within Baden-Württemberg

The Karlsruhe Institute of Technology (KIT; German: Karlsruher Institut für Technologie) is both a German public research university in Karlsruhe, Baden-Württemberg, and a research center of the Helmholtz Association.

KIT was created in 2009 when the University of Karlsruhe (TH) (German: Universität Karlsruhe (TH)), founded in 1825 as a public research university and also known as the "Fridericiana", merged with the Karlsruhe Research Center (Forschungszentrum Karlsruhe), which had originally been established in 1956 as a national nuclear research center (Kernforschungszentrum Karlsruhe, or KfK). By combining academic education with large-scale non-university research, KIT integrates research, teaching, and innovation in a single institutional structure that is unique within the German research landscape.

KIT is a member of the TU9, an alliance of nine leading technical universities in Germany. As part of the German Universities Excellence Initiative KIT was one of three universities which were awarded excellence status in 2006. In the following "German Excellence Strategy" KIT was awarded as one of eleven "Excellence Universities" in 2019. It is one of Germany's largest research universities, with 23,083 students in winter semester 2025/26 and an annual budget of €1,223.4 million in 2025.

Science-based mechanical engineering was founded at KIT in the mid-19th century under the direction of Ferdinand Redtenbacher, which influenced the foundation of other technical universities, such as ETH Zurich in 1855. It established the first German faculty for computer science in 1972. On 2 August 1984, the university received the first-ever German e-mail.

Professors and former students have won six Nobel Prizes, ten Leibniz Prizes, the most prestigious as well as the best-funded prize in Europe, and one Academy Award for Technical Achievement. The Karlsruhe Institute of Technology is well known for many inventors and entrepreneurs who studied or taught there, including Heinrich Hertz, Karl Friedrich Benz and the founders of SAP SE.

== History ==
Fridericiana, founded in 1825

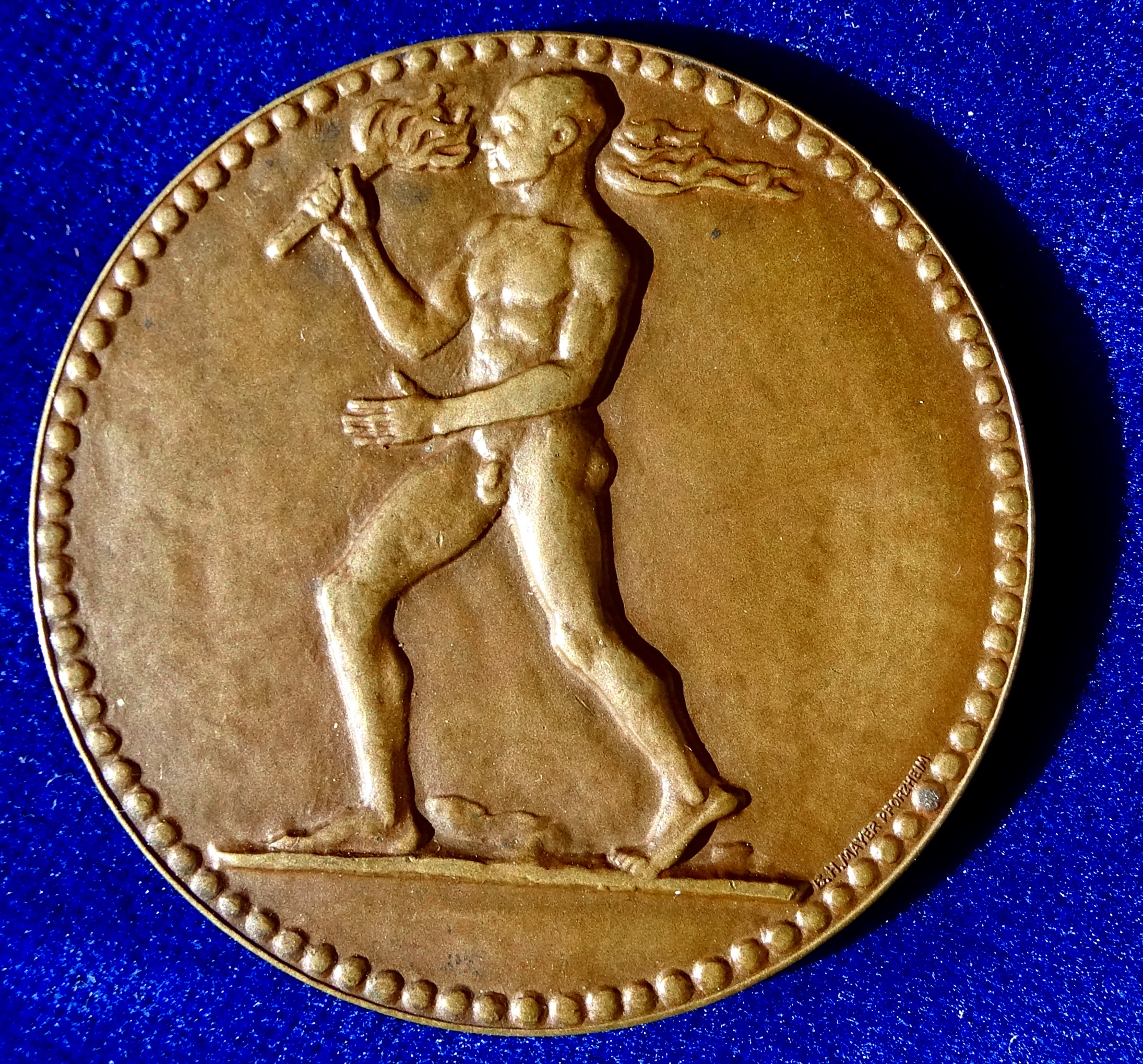
Medal FRIDERICIANA 100th Anniversary in 1925, obverse

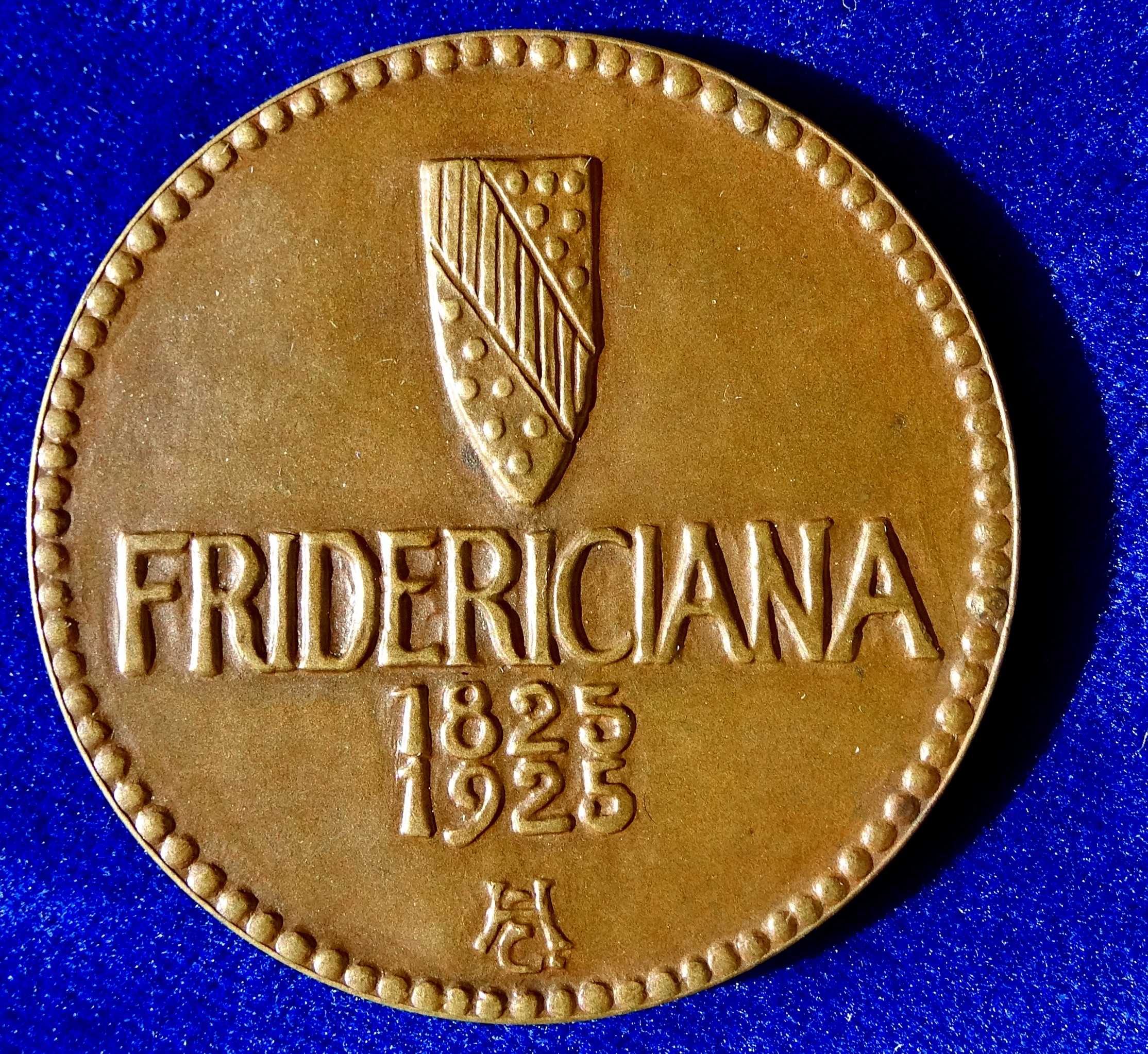
The reverse of this medal showing the arms of Baden

The University of Karlsruhe was founded on 7 October 1825 by Grand Duke Ludwig I of Baden under the name Polytechnische Schule. It was modelled on the École polytechnique in Paris. In its early official documents, it was still referred to as the Großherzogliche Badische Schule (Grand Ducal Baden School), reflecting its institutional origins founded by the regional sovereign. The university is the oldest technical university in Germany and the fourth oldest in Europe and has traditionally focused on engineering, natural sciences and economics.

In 1832, a Forstschule (school of forest sciences) was also established in response to the importance of forestry in the Baden region, particularly the Black Forest. The two institutions were later merged to form a single, expanded technical school.

In 1864, William Barton Rogers, the founding director of the Massachusetts Institute of Technology, remarked on the Polytechnische Schule in Karlsruhe: "The Polytechnic Institute at Carlsruhe, which is regarded as the model school of Germany and perhaps of Europe, is nearer what it is intended the Massachusetts Institute of Technology shall be than any other foreign institution."

In 1865, Grand Duke Friedrich I of Baden raised the school to the status of a Hochschule, an institution of higher education. Since 1902 the university has also been known as the Fridericiana in his honour. In 1885, it was declared a Technische Hochschule, or institute of technology, and in 1967, it became an Universität, a full university, which gave it the right to award regular doctorate degrees. It had hitherto been allowed to award doctorates only in engineering, identified as Dr.-Ing., a right bestowed on all technical institutes in 1899.

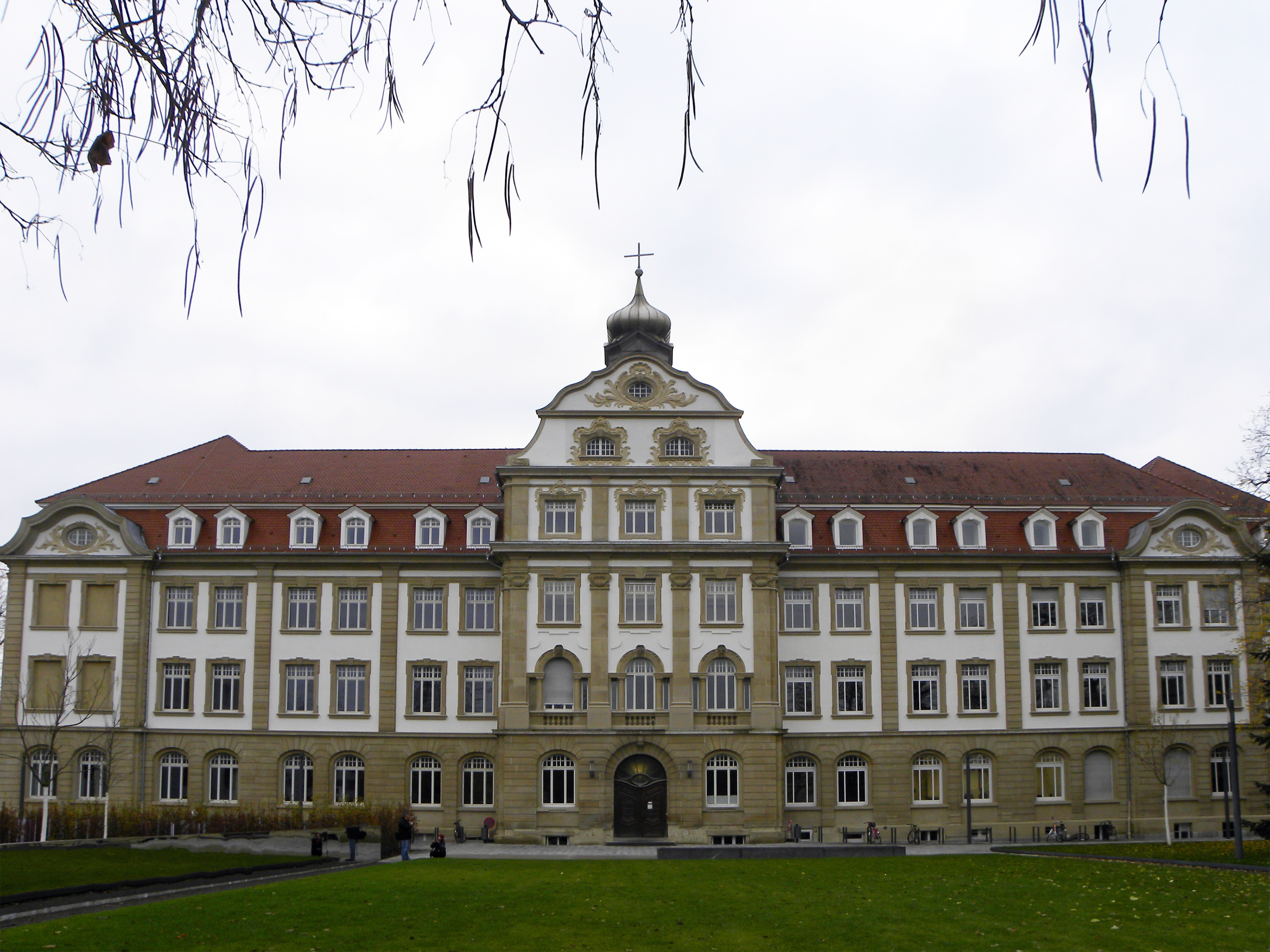
The Victoriapensionat I

The University of Karlsruhe is one of the leading German institutions in computer science. A central computer laboratory was founded in 1966. The department of informatics was established three years later, along with the first regular course in informatics. On 2 August 1984, the university received Germany's first email. The Institut für Meteorologie und Klimaforschung (Institute of Meteorology and Climate Research) was founded at the university in 1985.

The university also cooperated extensively with the Forschungszentrum Karlsruhe (Karlsruhe Research Centre), and this relationship was formalised on 6 April 2006 when Professor Horst Hippler and Dr. Dieter Ertmann from the University of Karlsruhe, and Professor Manfred Popp and Assistant Jur. Sigurd Lettow from Forschungszentrum Karlsruhe signed a contract for the foundation of the Karlsruhe Institute of Technology (KIT). The name was inspired by the Massachusetts Institute of Technology (MIT), the leading technical university in the United States. In February 2008, the merger of the university and the research centre to form KIT was agreed by the state of Baden-Württemberg and Germany's federal government. The necessary state law was passed on 8 July 2009. KIT was formally established on 1 October 2009.

The main reason for establishing KIT was to strengthen Karlsruhe's position in the German Universities Excellence Initiative, which offered elite universities grants of up to 50 million euros per annum. This aim was not achieved. While the University of Karlsruhe was chosen for the initiative in 2006/2007, KIT failed to secure a place in 2012. It did, however, attract funds from other sources. In 2008, Hans-Werner Hector, co-founder of SAP, raised 200 million euros to support researchers at the institute. (Hector is the only founder of SAP who did not graduate from the University of Karlsruhe; he was given an honorary doctorate for his support of intellectually gifted children in 2003.)

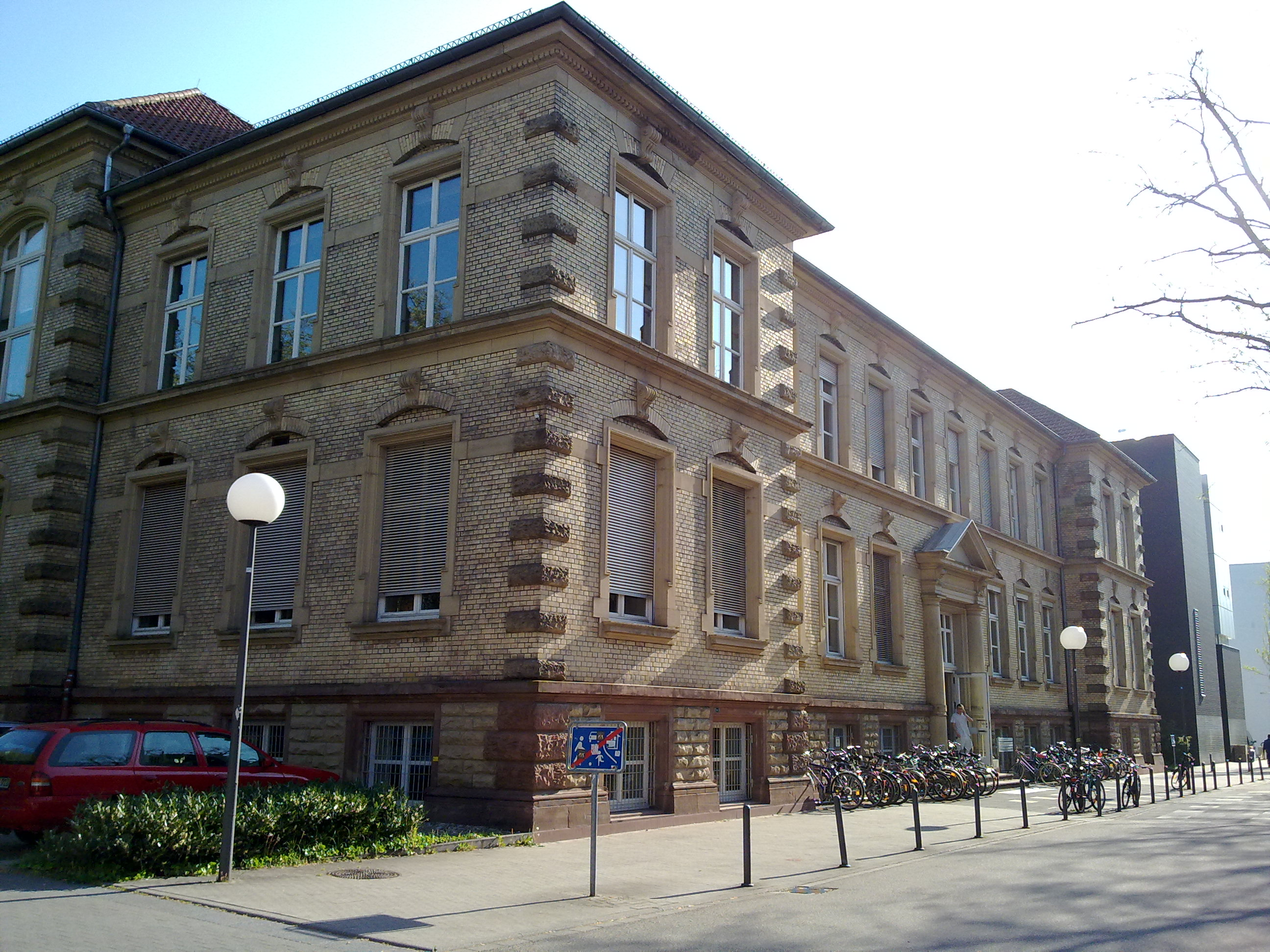
Institute of Electric Engineering at KIT

== Campus ==
=== Campus Nord ===
The Campus Nord (Campus North), the former Forschungszentrum, was founded in 1956 as Kernforschungszentrum Karlsruhe (KfK) (Karlsruhe Nuclear Research Centre). Initial activities focused on Forschungsreaktor 2 (FR2), the first nuclear reactor built by Germany. With the decline of nuclear energy activities in Germany, Kernforschungszentrum Karlsruhe directed its work increasingly towards alternative areas of basic and applied sciences. This change is reflected in the change of name from Kernforschungszentrum Karlsruhe to Forschungszentrum Karlsruhe with the subheading Technik und Umwelt (technology and environment) added in 1995. This subheading was replaced by in der Helmholtz-Gemeinschaft (in the Helmholtz Association of German Research Centers) in 2002.

Campus Nord is the site of the main German national nuclear engineering research centre and the Institute for Transuranium Elements. Also at the site is a nanotechnology research centre and the neutrino experiment KATRIN.

Campus Nord also hosts a 200-metre-tall guyed mast for meteorological measurements.

== Organization and administration ==
=== Faculties ===
The university has eleven faculties:

1. Faculty of Mathematics
2. Faculty of Physics
3. Faculty of Chemistry and Biology
4. Faculty of Humanities and Social sciences
5. Faculty of Architecture
6. Faculty of Civil engineering, Geology, and Ecological Sciences
7. Faculty of Mechanical Engineering
8. Faculty of Chemical and Process Engineering
9. Faculty of Electrical engineering and Information Technology
10. Faculty of Informatics
11. Faculty of Economics and Management

=== Special Institutes and Schools ===
==== Carl Benz School of Engineering ====
The Carl Benz School of Engineering (CBS) is the international mechanical engineering college of KIT. It is named after Carl Benz, the inventor of the automobile and a former student of the University of Karlsruhe.

Founded in 1999, CBS offers an English-taught Bachelor's program in Mechanical Engineering, designed for international students.

==== HECTOR School of Engineering and Management ====
In 2005, KIT launched a business technology school, the HECTOR School of Engineering and Management. The school offers Master of Science programmes, certificates and individual transfer qualifications in close cooperation with industry. It offers seven Master of Science programmes covering production, logistics, financial and risk management, information technology, renewable energy and mobility:

1. Master of Science in Energy Engineering and Management
2. Master of Science in Mobility Systems Engineering and Management
3. Master of Science in Product Development Management
4. Master of Science in Production and Operations Management
5. Master of Science in Information Systems Engineering and Management
6. Master of Science in Financial Engineering

==== Karlsruhe School of Optics & Photonics ====
The Karlsruhe School of Optics and Photonics (KSOP) was established in 2006 as a publicly funded project by the Deutsche Forschungsgemeinschaft under the German Universities Excellence Initiative. KSOP was the first graduate school at the University of Karlsruhe and covers the fields of photonic materials and devices, advanced spectroscopy, biomedical photonics, optical systems and solar energy. It is supported by several of the university's institutes and professors. It is also a partner in the EUROPHOTONICS consortium, which provides scholarship for master's and PhD degrees under the European Commission's prestigious Erasmus Mundus cooperation and mobility program.

==== Institute for Technology Assessment and Systems Analysis ====
The Institute for Technology Assessment and Systems Analysis is a research facility and is also a member of the Helmholtz Association of German Research Centres. The Institute investigates scientific and technological developments with a focus on their impacts and possible systemic and unintended effects. It produces analytical knowledge and assessments of socio-technical developments in order to provide policy and design options for decision-makers.

== Academic profile ==
=== Education ===
The university offers a great range of education options with such possibilities as cross studies and work-study programs. A studium generale (general studies) program was established in 1949, allowing students to attend lectures not directly pertaining their study field.

In the first semesters of a course, education tends to be theoretically oriented at KIT, with a high concentration on mathematics for engineering and natural science courses. It is possible to choose between practical and theoretical topics in later semesters.

Since the winter semester of 2008/2009, KIT has completed the transition from Diplom degrees to bachelor's degrees and master's degrees. Students already enrolled for a Diplom degree when the transition began were allowed to finish their studies, but new students are allowed to apply only for a bachelor's or master's degree.

Admission policies differ among the departments. While students are chosen by the quality of their school degree and their extracurricular activities for courses such as industrial engineering and management (27% of admissions in 2008), other departments do not preselect for their courses, including physics, informatics, and meteorology. All courses require a minimum number of passed exams, called Orientierungsprüfungen or orientation assessments, in the first three semesters before students are allowed to complete their course. There is a substantial drop-out rate in some engineering courses due to the immense study required to meet the prerequisites.

The Zentrum für Angewandte Kulturwissenschaft und Studium Generale (Centre for Applied Culture and General Studies) was founded in 1989 as a central institution to support students engaged in interdisciplinary study. Nowadays, it offers specialised qualifications in the fields of "Leadership and Entrepreneurship", "Media – Culture – Communication", "Internationalisation and Intercultural Decision-making and Responsibility", "Diversity Management", and "European Integration and Identity Studies", as well as the classical studium generale. There is also the possibility of concomitant study in applied culture science.

=== Research ===
In 1979, the Interfakultatives Institut für Anwendungen der Informatik (Interfaculty Institute for Informatics Applications) was founded. It brings together research in physics, mathematics, and engineering based on computer science. Its mathematical pendant is the Institut für Wissenschaftliches Rechnen und Mathematische Modellbildung (Institute for Scientific Calculations and Mathematical Modelling). Its aim is to enhance the exchange between mathematics and engineering in the fields of scientific calculations.

The Interfakultatives Institut für Entrepreneurship (Interfaculty Institute for Entrepreneurship) was established with SAP funding. Its teaching professors were entrepreneurs on their own. Before being shut down in 2010, a former professor of this faculty was Götz Werner, founder of dm-drogerie markt.

In 2001, the Centre for Functional Nanostructures (CFN) was established. It merges the fields within material sciences, biology, chemistry, engineering, and physics which are related to nanotechnology. CFN is one of the three Exzellenzzentren (English: Excellence Institutions) of the University of Karlsruhe. Another interdisciplinary institution is the Center for Disaster Management and Risk Reduction Technology (CEDIM).

The Karlsruhe School of Optics and Photonics (KSOP) was established in 2006 as a publicly funded project by the Deutsche Forschungsgemeinschaft under the German Universities Excellence Initiative. KSOP was the first graduate school at the University of Karlsruhe and covers the fields of photonic materials and devices, advanced spectroscopy, biomedical photonics, optical systems and solar energy. It is supported by several of the university's institutes and professors. It is also a partner in the EUROPHOTONICS consortium, which provides scholarship for master's and PhD degrees under the European Commission's prestigious Erasmus Mundus cooperation and mobility program.

The Karlsruhe Decision & Design Lab (KD²Lab) was established in 2016 and is one of the worldwide largest computer-based experimental laboratories. The laboratory offers an excellent infrastructure for conducting economic, neurological, and psychophysiological experiments, enabling researchers to study human decision-making behavior in controlled environments. The KD²Lab also facilitates interdisciplinary research into the complex interplay of cognitive and affective processes underlying human decision-making. The facility brings together researchers from a variety of fields, including economics, information systems, engineering, psychology and computer science.

In January 2019 the cluster of excellence "3D Matter made to order" (3DMM2O), affiliated with both the Karlsruhe Institute of Technology and the University of Heidelberg started to operate. Specializing in two-photon polymerization, it aims to revolutionize 3D printing on micro and nanoscales. By uniting expertise across materials science, engineering, and physics, the cluster seeks to develop precise and versatile fabrication techniques for various applications, from biotechnology to electronics.

KIT operates several TCCON stations as part of an international collaborative effort to measure greenhouse gases globally. One station is near the campus.

KIT is partner of the science project for urban and autonomous freight logistics, efeuCampus in Bruchsal, which is funded by the state of Baden-Württemberg and the European Union. At the Institute for Conveying Technology and Logistics Systems (IFL), conveyor systems for intralogistics are being developed for the research project, which are used for mobile robotics and human-machine interaction. The project develops localization and navigation algorithms for an urban environment, which enable vehicles to navigate independently on the basis of laser and video data.

On 29 July 2026, the Fusion Technology Research Hub (also known as "MAT-TRIX") was officially established at KIT as a research initiative to accelerate the industrialization of nuclear fusion energy. Funded by the German Federal Ministry of Education and Research with approximately €30 million, this hub shifts the focus from basic plasma physics toward engineering, scaling, and technology transfer to bridge the gap between academic research and commercial power plant deployment. Operating as a central node in a public-private partnership, KIT leverages its existing infrastructure—including decades of expertise from the former Karlsruhe Research Center (now Campus North)—to collaborate with industrial partners and deep-tech startups like Proxima Fusion and Gauss Fusion. The hub's key research areas focus on critical engineering challenges, including advanced magnet systems using high-temperature superconductors (HTS), materials science for reactor blankets, cryogenics, and advancing systems for fuel cycle and tritium technology.

In June 2026, KIT researchers, in collaboration with the German Aerospace Center, published PAINT (Pre-processed and Aligned Information of a Solar Tower), the world's first open-access, high-resolution database for an operational concentrating solar power (CSP) tower plant. Published in *Nature Energy*, the 849 GB dataset provides machine-readable operational and meteorological data from the Jülich Solar Tower to accelerate global solar thermal research and AI-driven automation.

=== Support for Entrepreneurship ===
KIT is considered one of the most important drivers of the startup scene in Germany. With the KIT-Gründerschmiede, established in 2013 by students and staff, KIT operates a central platform for promoting entrepreneurial ventures. The Gründerschmiede supports students, researchers, and alumni through individual mentoring, networking events, new educational formats, and its own crowdfunding platform, KITcrowd. It fosters both technology-based spin-offs from academic research and student-driven startup initiatives.

Each year, more than 30 startups are launched in the KIT environment, and from 2008 to 2018, around 300 startups have been founded.

Additionally, the Center for Interdisciplinary Entrepreneurship provides support in the early stages of venture development, particularly in idea generation and business model design. Another key initiative is the PionierGarage, a student-run association that promotes entrepreneurship through lectures, workshops, and trips (e.g., to Silicon Valley), aiming to inspire and connect aspiring founders.

KIT is closely embedded in the local startup ecosystem, which includes institutions like the CyberForum, the EXI Startup Voucher, the VC Ventures Incubator, and the "Perfekt Futur" Creative Park. The latter offers office spaces housed in repurposed shipping containers at the former municipal slaughterhouse site.

=== Rankings and reputation ===
University rankings

Overall – Global & National
QS World 2026	▲98	▲5
THE World 2026	166	▲15
ARWU World 2023	301–400	20–24

According to the QS World University Rankings for 2024, KIT was ranked 102nd globally and 6th in Germany. The Times Higher Education World University Rankings for 2024 listed KIT at a global position of 140, and 14th nationally within Germany. Furthermore, the Academic Ranking of World Universities (ARWU) for 2023 placed KIT in the 301–400 range worldwide, and between 20th and 24th in the country.

In the 2023 QS Subject Ranking, KIT ranks first in Germany in chemical engineering. In the 2023 THE Subject Ranking, KIT ranks within the global 100 in engineering, computer science, and the physical sciences. In the 2023 ARWU Subject Ranking, KIT ranks first in Germany in metallurgical engineering, atmospheric science, and energy science, while sharing the first place in materials science and water resources.

QS Subject Ranking 2023
Subject	Global	National
Arts & Humanities	N/A	N/A
Architecture and Built Environment	51–100	3–5
Engineering and Technology	▲50	▲2
Engineering – Chemical	▲32	1
Engineering – Civil and Structural	101–150	4–6
Computer Science and Information Systems	▲104	5
Engineering – Electrical and Electronic	▲57	4
Engineering – Mechanical	▲35	3
Natural Sciences	▼50	▼4
Chemistry	▲59	▲3
Earth and Marine Sciences	101–150	▼7–13
Geology	101–150	7–13
Geophysics	101–150	▼7–13
Materials Sciences	▲29	2
Mathematics	▲143	9
Physics and Astronomy	▲46	4
Social Sciences & Management	N/A	N/A
Economics and Econometrics	301–350	▲12–15

THE Subject Ranking 2023
Subject	Global	National
Computer science	▼71	6
Engineering	▼64	4
Physical sciences	▲100	▼9

ARWU Subject Ranking 2022
Subject	Global	National
Natural Sciences
Mathematics	301–400	▲19–29
Physics	101–150	▼8
Chemistry	▼76–100	▼2–5
Earth Sciences	101–150	▼5–12
Ecology	101–150	8–13
Atmospheric Science	▼31	1
Engineering
Mechanical Engineering	101–150	▲3–5
Electrical & Electronic Engineering	301–400	▲8–15
Instruments Science & Technology	▼201–300	▼3–6
Computer Science & Engineering	201–300	▲3–10
Civil Engineering	201–300	2–4
Chemical Engineering	101–150	2
Materials Science & Engineering	▼76–100	1–2
Nanoscience & Nanotechnology	76–100	2
Energy Science & Engineering	▼35	1
Environmental Science & Engineering	76–100	2
Water Resources	76–100	▲1–3
Biotechnology	151–200	▲8–13
Remote Sensing	▼51–75	3–4
Metallurgical Engineering	▼26	1
Life Sciences
Agricultural Sciences	151–200	▼9–18
Social Sciences
Economics	201–300	▼9–15
Management	401–500	▼15–26

In the Nature Index (1 May 2022 – 30 April 2023), which measures the scientific strength of different institutions on the basis of publications in 82 high-quality scientific journals, the KIT ranks second in the field of physical sciences among the universities in Germany, 7th in Europe, and 63rd worldwide. The Technical University of Munich ranks first in Germany, ranks three to five are followed by LMU Munich, the University of Hamburg, and the University of Mainz.

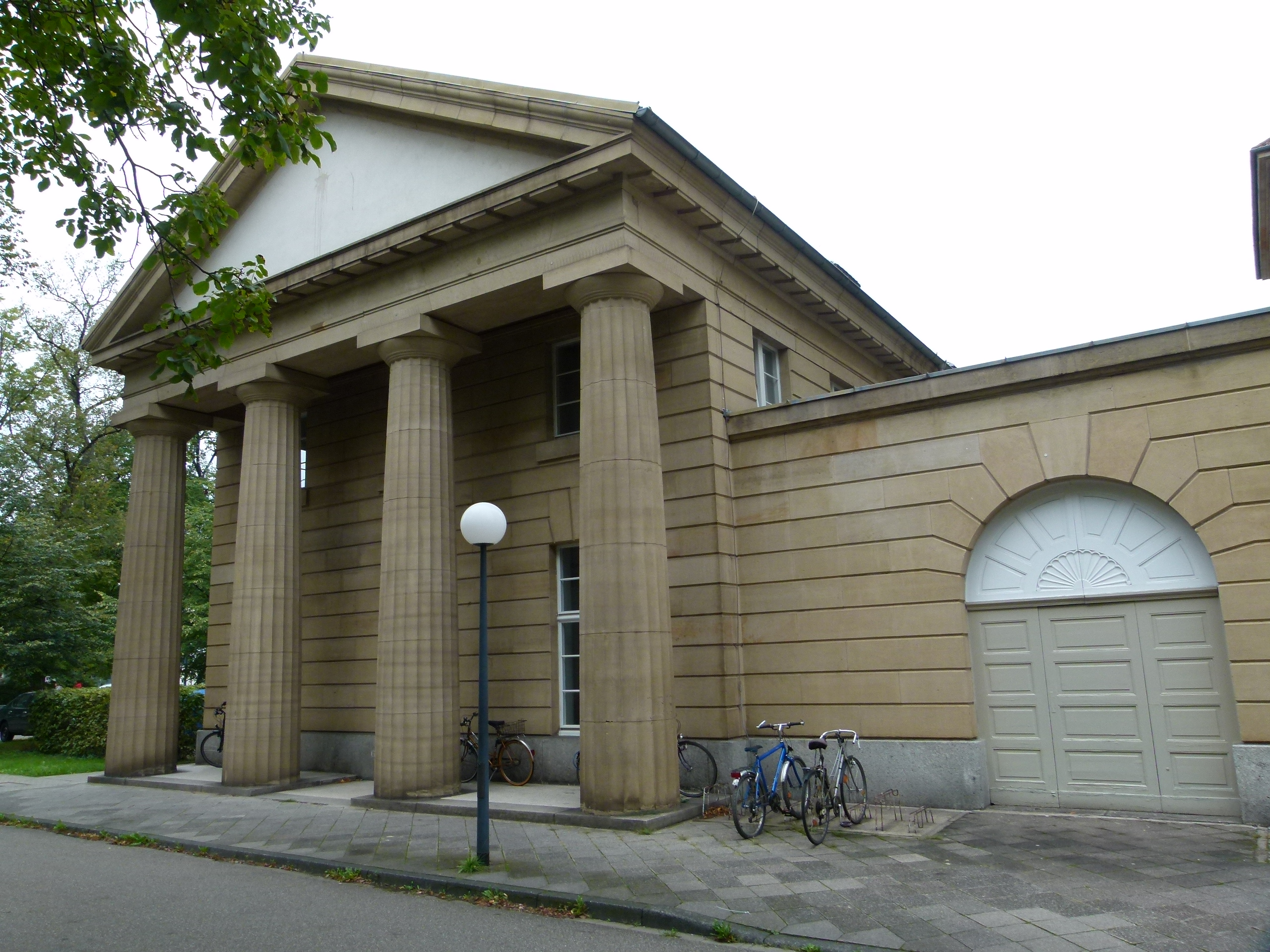
Otto Amman Place at KIT

According to a 2015 survey, KIT has produced the largest number of top managers among German universities, with 24 board members of the 100 largest German companies. The other places are followed by the University of Cologne (17), RWTH Aachen University (17), the University of Mannheim (13) and LMU Munich (13). In the ranking of the German magazine Wirtschaftswoche, in which decision-makers of companies are asked about their preferences, KIT regularly occupies a position among the top ten in the subjects electrical engineering, computer science, mechanical engineering, and industrial engineering in Germany. In the QS Graduate Employability Rankings 2022, which follow a similar approach as the Wirtschaftswoche ranking on a global level, KIT is ranked 46th worldwide. Thus, KIT takes first place in Germany and 10th place in Europe.

In the CWTS Leiden Ranking of the year 2023, which is based exclusively on bibliometrics to measure the research output of universities, KIT is ranked 56th worldwide in the physical sciences and engineering according to the "Impact" indicator and 49th worldwide according to the "Collaboration" indicator. In Germany, KIT is ranked first ahead of RWTH Aachen University and the Technical University of Munich. Europe-wide, KIT is ranked 4th and 8th respectively.

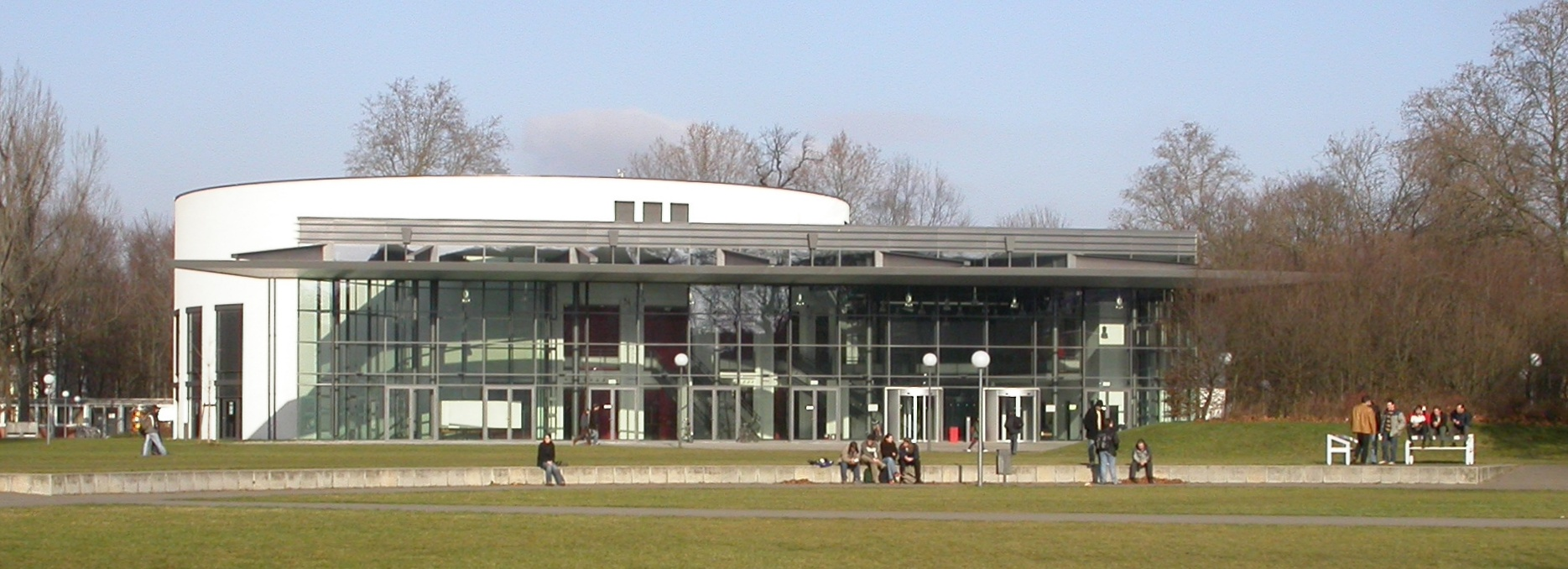
Audimax lecture hall

In the 2023 Performance Ranking of Scientific Papers for World Universities released by the National Taiwan University, KIT is ranked 4th in the fields of natural sciences and engineering in Germany.

In the Webometrics Ranking of World Universities for the year 2023, KIT ranks fifth among 483 listed universities and scientific institutions in Germany. In the ranking U-Multirank funded by the European Union, KIT is ranked 5th out of 106 universities examined in Germany across all categories in 2022. In the University Ranking by Academic Performance (URAP) 2017/2018, KIT is ranked first in Germany in the subjects "Chemical Sciences" (world rank: 49), "Technology" (world rank: 54), "Nanoscience & Nanomaterials" (world rank: 58), "Materials Engineering" (world rank: 48), Chemical Engineering (ranked 43), Mechanical Engineering (ranked 58), Civil Engineering (ranked 76), Environmental Engineering (ranked 98), Meteorology & Atmospheric Sciences (ranked 15) and Transportation Science & Technology (ranked 123) Further top rankings are also achieved in "Physical Sciences" (rank Germany: 3; world rank: 55); "Mathematical Sciences" (rank Germany: 2; world rank: 66); "Engineering" (rank Germany: 3 (after rank 1 last year); world rank 107); "Electrical & Electronics Engineering" (rank Germany: 2; world rank: 70), "Information & Computing Sciences" (rank Germany: 2; world rank: 63), "Earth Sciences" (rank Germany: 2; world rank: 54), "Geology" (rank Germany: 5; world rank: 111), "Metallurgy Engineering" (rank Germany: 2; world rank: 34) and "Architecture" (rank Germany: 2; world rank: 71).

KIT is a member of the TU9 German Institutes of Technology e.V. As part of the German Universities Excellence Initiative KIT was awarded an excellence status in 2006 and 2019. In the 2011 performance-ranking of scientific papers, Karlsruhe ranked first in Germany and among the top 10 universities in Europe in engineering and natural sciences. In 2005, more than 20% of its students come from other nations and 0.6% of its students receive grants from the German Studienstiftung (German National Academic Foundation).

=== Computer facilities ===
The Scientific Computing Center (SCC), formerly called Steinbuch Centre for Computing, named after Karl Steinbuch, was formed in 2008 when the main computer facilities of the University of Karlsruhe merged with those at Forschungszentrum Karlsruhe. It is responsible for the university's IP connectivity and provides central services (Mail, Web, campus management) for students and employees. It supplies students with 10 fully equipped computer rooms, one professional print office and a wireless network providing access to the whole campus area. Some departments, like computer science, physics, and mathematics, run their own computer facilities as well.

The SCC operates some of the fastest computers in Germany:

- HP XC3000 (334 nodes with 8 cores each, 27.04 TFLOPS)
- HP XC4000 (750 nodes with 4 cores each, 15.77 TFLOPS)
- a cluster purchased by a corporation of institutes representing different disciplines (200 nodes with 8 cores each, 17.57 TFLOPS)
- the two vector parallel calculators NEC SX-8R and NEC SX-9

On 2 August 1984, Michael Rotert, a research fellow at University of Karlsruhe, received the first email ever sent to Germany, at his address rotert%germany@csnet-relay.csnet.

GridKa runs the Rocks Cluster Distribution Linux distribution for supercomputers.

=== Libraries ===
The KIT Library with its two branches on Campus South and Campus North provides literature for research and study for about 25,000 students and 8000 scientists with a widespread, interdisciplinary book stock of over 2 million volumes, reports and 28,000 periodicals in print and electronic form. The emphasis of the collection lies in natural and engineering sciences.

KIT Library South

The 24-hour library at Campus South was extended in 2006. It offers many workplaces and an area for relaxing, and is now open around the clock. The combination of a special book security system and an automated issue desk makes it possible to use the 1000 workplaces anytime, day or night. Current and contemporary literature is freely accessible in four specialised reading rooms, each providing cross-linked, modern and well-equipped study and work stations as well as printers, scanners and copy machines.

KIT Library North

The research library at Campus North provides a book stock (especially reports and primary reports) on energy and nuclear energy. All literature is accessible to the user. Thirty modern workplaces, as well as printers, scanners, copy machines and cubicles for individual work are available.

Further libraries at KIT

Additional literature is located in two specialised reading rooms for chemistry and physics, as well as in the Library of the University of Applied Sciences at the Campus at Moltkestrasse, which is administered by the KIT Library. The faculty of physics, the faculty of mathematics, the faculty of computer science, the faculty of architecture and the faculty of economics and management have their own libraries to supply students and researchers with topic-related literature.

== Notable people ==
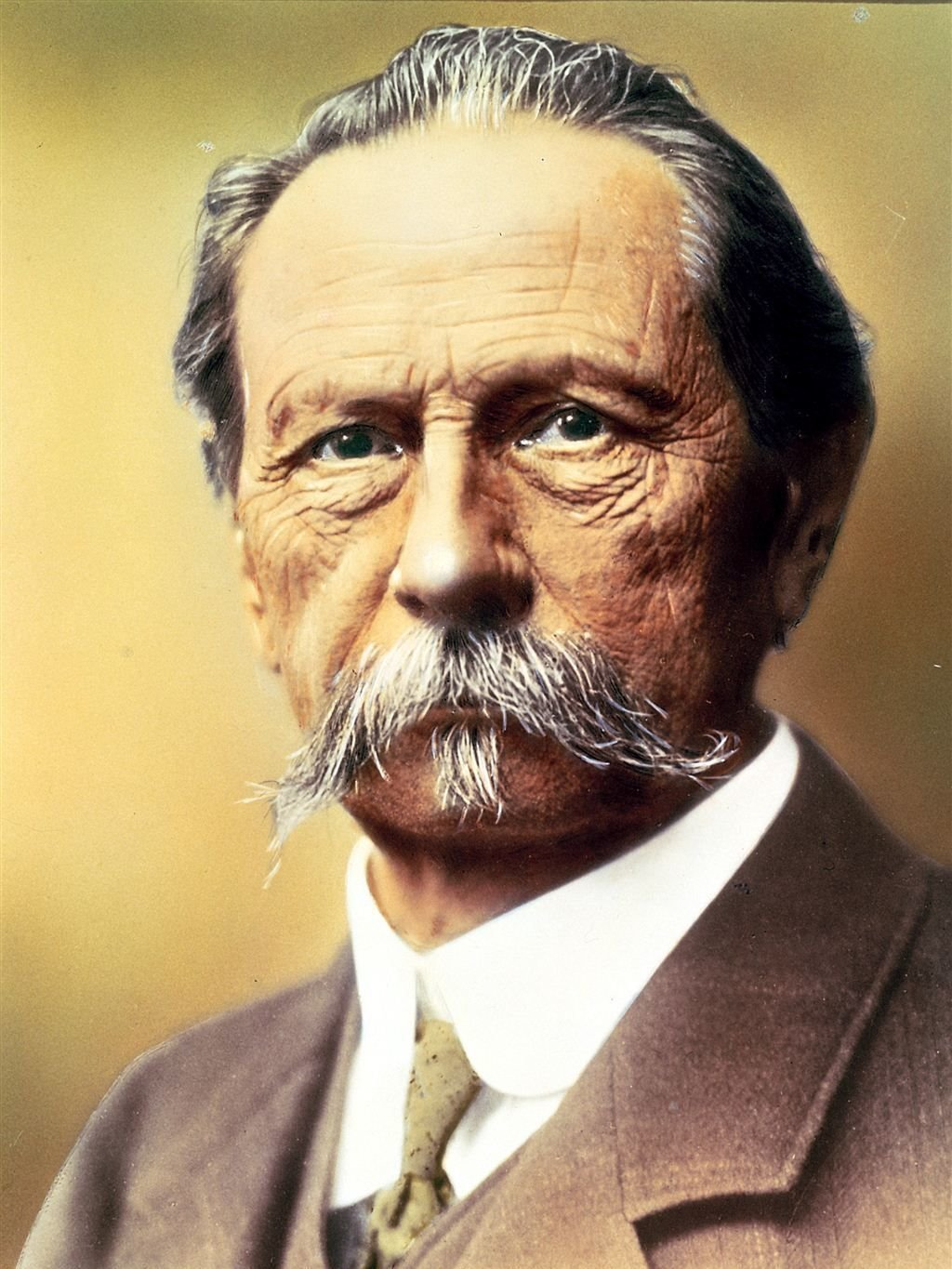
Karl Benz was granted the patent for the first automobile, which he built in 1885.

=== Professors ===
- Karl Ferdinand Braun (1850–1918), who developed the cathode ray tube in 1897, which is widely used in televisions; in 1909 he received the Nobel Prize for the invention
- Wolfgang Gaede (1878–1945), who founded vacuum technology
- Franz Grashof (1826–1893), who significantly contributed to the understanding of free convection; the Grashof Number was named after him
- Fritz Haber (1868–1934), who developed the high-pressure synthesis of ammonia in 1909 and won a Nobel Prize in Chemistry in 1918
- Heinrich Hertz (1857–1894) discovered electromagnetic waves in 1887, which are the basis for radio transmission, and after whom the SI unit of frequency, hertz is named
- Karl Heun (1859–1929), who is known for his work on numerical integration and solutions to differential equations. He discovered the Heun method.
- Otto Lehmann (1855–1922), the founder of liquid crystal research
- Wilhelm Nusselt (1882–1957), the co-founder of technical thermodynamics
- Ferdinand Redtenbacher (1809–1863), founder of science-based mechanical engineering in Germany
- Roland Scholl (1865–1945), discovered coronene and contributed significantly to the field of organic chemistry in general
- Hermann Staudinger (1881–1965), who won the Nobel Prize in Chemistry in 1953 for his discoveries in the field of macromolecular chemistry
- Karl Steinbuch (1917–2005), a pioneer of computer science in Germany who coined the German term for the field, Informatik, and made early contributions to machine learning and artificial neural networks
- Julius Wess (1934–2007), who co-invented the Wess–Zumino model, the Wess–Zumino–Witten model, the Wess–Zumino consistency condition, and the Thirring–Wess model, in the fields of supersymmetry, quantum field theory and conformal field theory
- Ulrich Lemmer (born 1964), a pioneer of organic semiconductors in Germany
- Peter Sanders (born 1967), computer scientist who won the Leibniz Prize in 2012
- Maurus Schifferli (born 1973), landscape architect
- Alexander Lytchak (born 1978), mathematics professor
- Clemens Puppe (born 1960), German economist known for his work in decision theory and social choice theory

=== Alumni ===
- Johann Jakob Balmer (1825–1898), Swiss mathematician and mathematical physicist
- Karl Benz (1844–1929), the inventor of the automobile, a graduate who also received an honorary doctorate in 1914
- Christoph Bregler, fellow of the Institute of Electrical and Electronics Engineers and winner of the Academy Award for Technical Achievement in the Science and Technology category in 2016
- Martin Brudermüller (born 1961), German businessman, CEO of BASF
- Franz Fehrenbach (born 1949), chairman of Robert Bosch GmbH
- Paris Fokaides (born 1977), Academic and researcher
- Robert Gerwig (1820–1885), civil engineer responsible for the Black Forest Railway, the Gotthard Railway, and the Höllental Railway
- Fritz Görnnert (1907–1984), German aircraft engineer and civil servant in the Reich Aviation Ministry
- Hans Kollhoff (born 1946), Postmodernist and New Classical architect
- Erwin Kraus (1884–1966), engineer, motor transport specialist and leader of the National Socialist Motor Corps
- Ludwig Levy (1854–1907), Historicist architect
- Sergey Padyukov (1922–1993), architect
- Wilhelm Steinkopf (1879–1949), University of Karlsruhe alumni and professor, co-developer of a method for the mass production of mustard gas during World War I
- Edward Teller (1908–2003), who is known as the originator of the hydrogen bomb
- Roland Mack (born 1949), co-founder of Europa-Park, one of the most popular theme parks in Europe
- Oswald Mathias Ungers (1926–2007), rationalist architect
- Jakob Nagel (1899–1973), engineer and civil servant, state secretary in the Reich Postal Ministry
- Fritz Noether (1884–1941), mathematician and brother of Emmy Noether
- OUBEY (1958–2004), visual artist
- Hasso Plattner (born 1944), Dietmar Hopp (born 1940), Klaus Tschira (1940–2015), three of five co-founders of SAP
- Stefan Quandt (born 1966), businessman and major BMW shareholder
- Franz Reuleaux (1829–1905), a pioneer of kinematics and rector of the Technische Hochschule in Charlottenburg (now Technische Universität Berlin)
- Leopoldo Rother (1894–1978), architect who designed the campus of National University of Colombia in Bogotá
- Leopold Ružička (1887–1976), winner of the 1939 Nobel Prize in Chemistry
- Saliha Scheinhardt (born 1946), Turkish-German novelist
- Amin Shokrollahi (born 1964), Iranian mathematician
- Emil Škoda (1839–1900), the founder of the industrial conglomerate Škoda Works
- Albert Speer (1905–1981), Adolf Hitler's chief architect and Minister of Armaments and War Production
- Carsten Spohr (born 1966), CEO of Lufthansa
- Boudjemaa Talai (1952–2022), Algerian politician
- August Thyssen (1842–1926), industrialist who founded the steel producer Thyssen AG, a predecessor of ThyssenKrupp, and co-founded RWE, one of the largest German electric utilities companies today
- Ivan Vasilyov (1893–1979), architect of the Bulgarian National Bank headquarters and the Ministry of Defence
- Herbert Wetterauer (born 1957), painter, sculptor, and author
- Rolf Wideröe (1902–1996), Norwegian accelerator physicist
- Dieter Zetsche (born 1953), chairman of Daimler AG and head of Mercedes-Benz Cars
- Tobias Lindner (born 1982), German economist and politician
- Joachim Nagel (born 1966), German economist and President of the Deutsche Bundesbank
- Alexander Gerst (born 1976), German European Space Agency astronaut
- Michael Waidner (born 1961), German Computer Scientist, Director of ATHENE and Fraunhofer Institute for Secure Information Technology.
- Charles Frédéric Gerhardt (1816–1856) Chemist known for reforming the notation for chemical formulas and contributions in chemistry field.
- Fernando Carro (born 1964), CEO of Bayer Leverkusen.
- Amel Karboul (born 1973), Tunisian leading expert in education reform and leadership, and founding CEO of the Education Outcomes Fund, an independent trust fund hosted by the UNICEF.
- Thomas Groß (born 1965), German Banker and CEO of Helaba Landesbank Hessen-Thüringen.
- Rainer Neske (born 1964), German banker and CEO of Landesbank Baden-Württemberg.
- Albrecht Hornbach (born 1954), German businessman, CEO of Hornbach.
- Dhruv Rathee (born 1994), Indian YouTuber, political commentator, and content creator known for science, politics, and current affairs; studied Mechanical Engineering at KIT.

=== Other ===
- Georg von Hevesy (1886–1966), winner of the 1943 Nobel Prize for his key role in the development of radioactive tracers to study chemical processes such as in the metabolism of animals, worked with Fritz Haber at University of Karlsruhe without formal appointment

=== Rectors ===
- 1968 – 1983 Heinz Draheim
- 1983 – 1994 Heinz Kunle
- 1994 – 2002 Sigmar Wittig
- 2002 – 2009 Horst Hippler
- 2009–2012: Horst Hippler and Eberhard Umbach
- 2012–2013: Eberhard Umbach
- 2013–2023: Holger Hanselka
- 2023–2024: Oliver Kraft
- since 2024: Jan S. Hesthaven

== Points of interest ==
- Botanical Garden of the KIT, the university's botanical garden
