= Bank of Saxony =

Former German bank

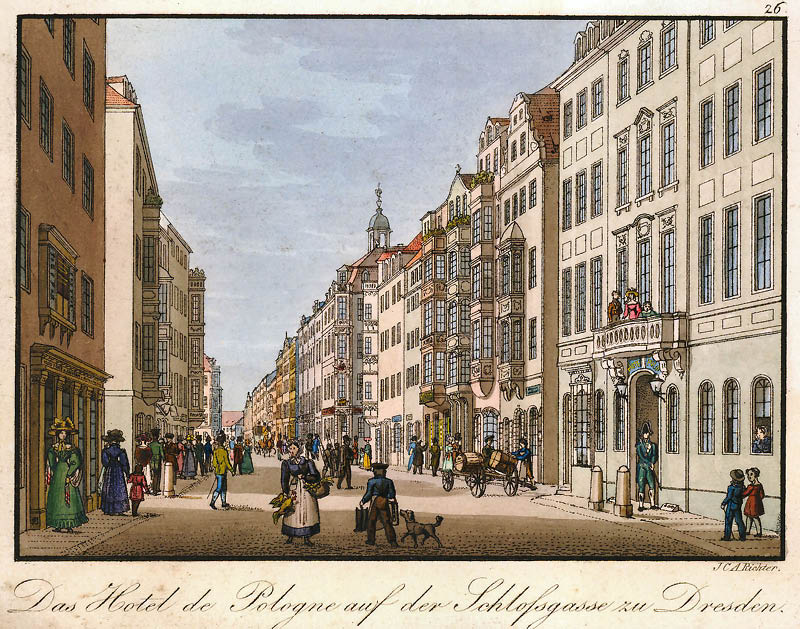
The Hôtel de Pologne in Dresden (right), seat of the Bank of Saxony from 1869 to 1945

The Bank of Saxony (German: Sächsische Bank) was a German bank founded in 1865, based in Dresden. It issued its own banknotes until 1935, and was liquidated following World War II.

== History ==
The Sächsische Bank zu Dresden (Bank of Saxony at Dresden) was founded with a state concession on 18 July 1865 and a capital of 5 million thalers. In 1869 it settled its head office in the former Hôtel de Pologne, a historic building at Schloßstraße 7 in the center of Dresden, whose façade it remodeled to a design by architect Karl Eberhard. In 1873 the capital was increased by 5 million thalers, and later changed to 30 million marks.

With the founding of the German Empire in 1871, individual states such as the Kingdom of Saxony lost their right to legislate with regard to the monetary system. The Reichsbank, established by imperial legislation of 14 March 1875, did not receive a monopoly on the issue of banknotes, however, and the existing local central banks retained the right to issue banknotes to the extent set out in an appendix to Section 9 of the law. Among these, the Leipziger Bank renounced note-issuance in 1875, the Chemnitzer Stadtbank in 1890, and the Leipziger Kassenverein in 1890, leaving the Bank of Saxony as the only note-issuing bank in Saxony; its banknotes could be circulated throughout the empire. From 1888 onwards, it also offered its customers commission-free check and giro transactions.

After the hyperinflation of 1923, the Weimar Republic passed the Private Central Bank Act of 30 August 1924, which capped the amount the Bank of Saxony could issue at a maximum of 70 million Reichsmarks annually. The bank's share capital was changed to 15 million Reichsmarks in 1924. From the 1920s, the Bank of Saxony also operated bus routes through subsidiaries, which often took over feeder services to the state railway lines.

Like its surviving peers the Bank of Baden, the Bayerische Notenbank, and the Württembergische Notenbank, the Bank of Saxony was deprived of its right to issue banknotes by Nazi legislation of 18 November 1933, with effect on 31 December 1935. To avoid liquidation, it cooperated with the Sächsische Staatsbank and took over the latter's customer business on 1 January 1937. In 1945 the Sächsische Staatsbank held 80% of the capital of the Bank of Saxony.

In 1945, both the Sächsische Staatsbank and the Bank of Saxony were expropriated without compensation by the Soviet occupation authorities. The Bank of Saxony was eventually deleted from the commercial register in 1947. Its holdings in West Germany were held in a fiduciary entity appointed by the West German Federal Finance Minister from 1950 to 1980. These assets were finally liquidated and paid off by 1981.

== See also ==
- Hamburger Bank
- German public banking sector
- List of banks in Germany
