= Paris Fokaides =

Greek Cypriot academic and researcher

Paris A. Fokaides
- Born: June 28, 1977 (age 49); Nicosia, Cyprus
- Education: Mechanical Engineering Diploma (Δίπλωμα Μηχανολόγου Μηχανικού – Dipl.-Ing.); Doctor of Engineering Sciences (Doktor der Ingenieurwissenschaften – Dr.-Ing.); University of Karlsruhe (TH); Aristotle University Thessaloniki
- Occupations: Academic and researcher
- Engineering career
- Institutions: Frederick University; Kaunas University of Technology; Euphyia Tech
- Website: http://www.parisfokaides.com/

Paris A. Fokaides is a Greek Cypriot academic and researcher in the field of sustainable energy technologies. He is most known for his contributions through his work in academia, research, and consultancy.

== Education ==
Fokaides holds a PhD in Process Engineering from the University of Karlsruhe (TH) in Germany (2009) and a Diploma in Mechanical Engineering from Aristotle University in Thessaloniki, Greece (2002).

== Career ==
Since 2012, Fokaides has been at Frederick University, Cyprus, serving as Associate Professor and Senior Researcher, and founding the Sustainable Energy Research Group. He is also a Chief Researcher at Kaunas University of Technology, Lithuania since 2017. Previously, he worked as a Research Associate at Karlsruhe University (2002–2007) and University of Cyprus (2008–2012). In 2021, he founded Euphyia Tech, a spin-off focusing on smart and sustainable building assessment

Fokaides holds a patent for the invention of a fuel injection apparatus that sprays liquid fuel to form a film and uses a secondary flow for atomization, ensuring uniform fuel-air distribution in combustion.

Fokaides is also teaching at Frederick University and Kaunas University of Technology. He lectures in Energy, Fluid Mechanics, Heat Transfer and Process Engineering.

== Research ==
Fokaides has led and participated in research and consultancy projects with work spanning sustainable energy systems, smart and sustainable buildings, and renewable energy technologies. He has been involved in over 40 research projects, coordinating three. His consultancy work includes public sector projects and coordinating 13.

== Publications ==
Fokaides been featured since 2020 in the World's Top 2% Scientists in the field of Energy and Building and Construction, according to the Stanford ranking. He serves as the Editor-in-Chief of the International Journal of Sustainable Energy. He is also a member of editorial boards, including Current Sustainable/Renewable Energy Reports, Energy Sources, Part A: Recovery, Utilization, and Environmental Effects, Energies, Sustainability and the Journal of Sustainable Architecture and Civil Engineering.

== Standardization work ==
Fokaides has been involved in standardization, representing the Cyprus Standardization Organization (CYS) in CEN committees. He is the convenor of CEN/TC 371/WG5 "Operational rating of energy performance of buildings" and contributes to other working groups focused on data transmission, HVAC control equipment, and digital twins in the built environment. He was awarded the CEN-CENELEC Standards + Innovation Awards 2023, representing the D² EPC project, for its contribution to standardization.

== Professional affiliations and societal engagements ==
Fokaides is the Cyprus Build Up Ambassador and is a member of committees, such as the SET Plan Working Group 8 on Renewable Fuels and Bioenergy, and Cost Actions on sustainable valorization of lignin, smart energy regions and life cycle assessment. Additionally, he has been a board member and spokesman for Olympiakos Nicosia football club since 2014.

== Awards and honors ==
- 2007 – Best Paper Award, Combustion, Fuels & Emissions Committee, ASME Turbo Expo
- 2021, 2024 – Best Researcher Award, Frederick University
- 2023 – Standards + Innovation Award, CEN-CENELEC

== Bibliography ==
=== Books ===
- Advances in Solid Biofuels (Green Energy and Technology) (2018) ISBN 978-3-030-00861-1
- Environmental Assessment of Renewable Energy Conversion Technologies (2022) ISBN 978-0-12-817111-0

=== Selected articles ===
- Kylili, A., Fokaides, P. A., Christou, P., & Kalogirou, S. A. (2014). Infrared thermography (IRT) applications for building diagnostics: A review. Applied Energy, 134, 531–549.
- Reckien, D., Salvia, M., Heidrich, O., Church, J. M., Pietrapertosa, F., De Gregorio-Hurtado, S., ... & Dawson, R. (2018). How are cities planning to respond to climate change? Assessment of local climate plans from 885 cities in the EU-28. Journal of cleaner production, 191, 207–219.
- Kylili, A., Afxentiou, N., Georgiou, L., Panteli, C., Morsink-Georgalli, P. Z., Panayidou, A., ... & Fokaides, P. A. (2020). The role of Remote Working in smart cities: lessons learnt from COVID-19 pandemic. Energy Sources, Part A: Recovery, Utilization, and Environmental Effects, 1–16.
- Panteli, C., Kylili, A., & Fokaides, P. A. (2020). Building information modelling applications in smart buildings: From design to commissioning and beyond A critical review. Journal of Cleaner Production, 265, 121766.
- Spudys, P., Afxentiou, N., Georgali, P. Z., Klumbyte, E., Jurelionis, A., & Fokaides, P. (2023). Classifying the operational energy performance of buildings with the use of digital twins. Energy and Buildings, 290, 113106.
- Spudys, P., Osadcha, I., Morkunaite, L., Manhanga, F. C., Georgali, P. Z., Klumbyte, E., ... & Fokaides, P. (2024). A comparative life cycle assessment of building sustainability across typical European building geometries. Energy, 302, 131693.
