= Württembergische Notenbank =

Former German bank

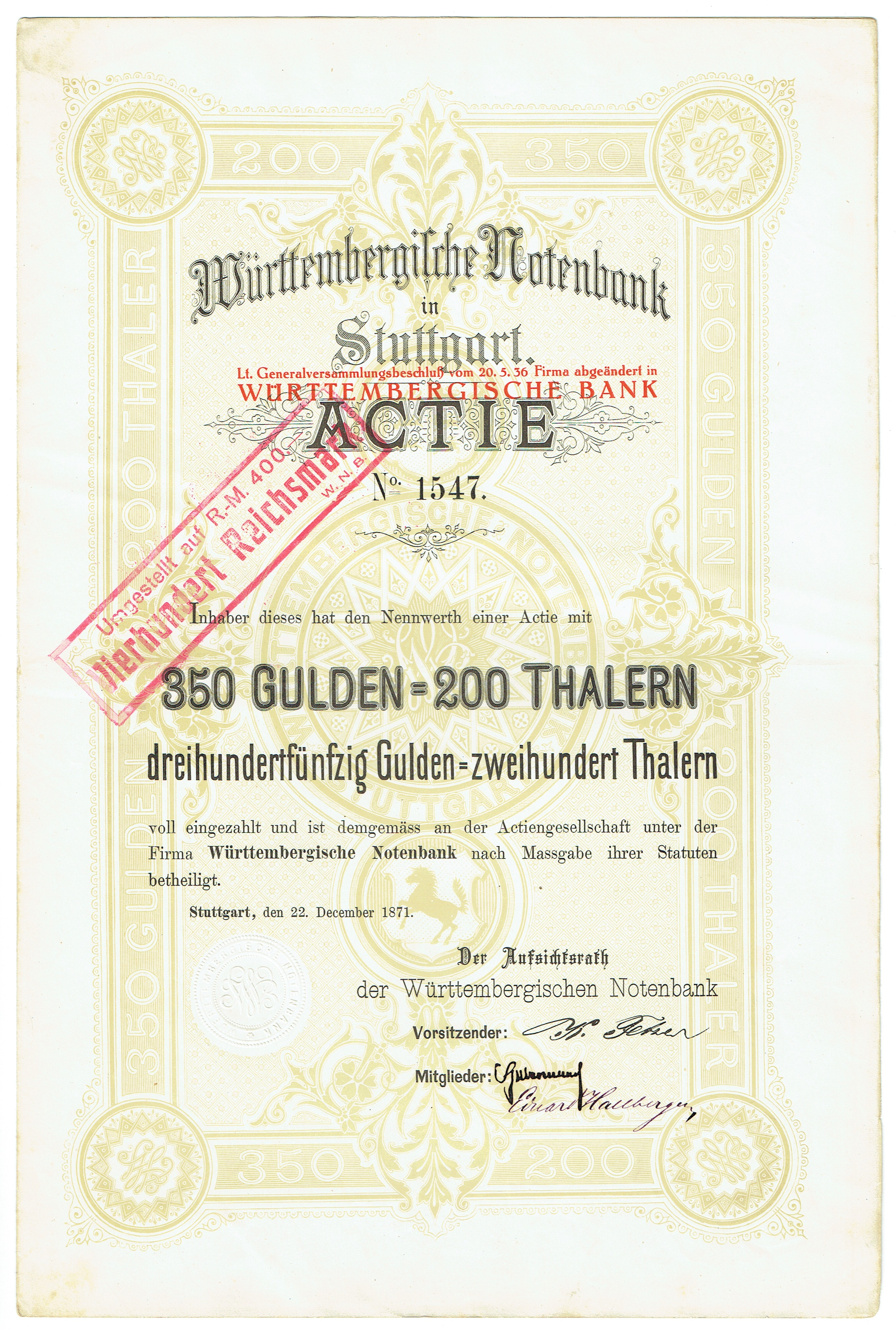
Share of the Württembergische Notenbank, issued 22 December 1871

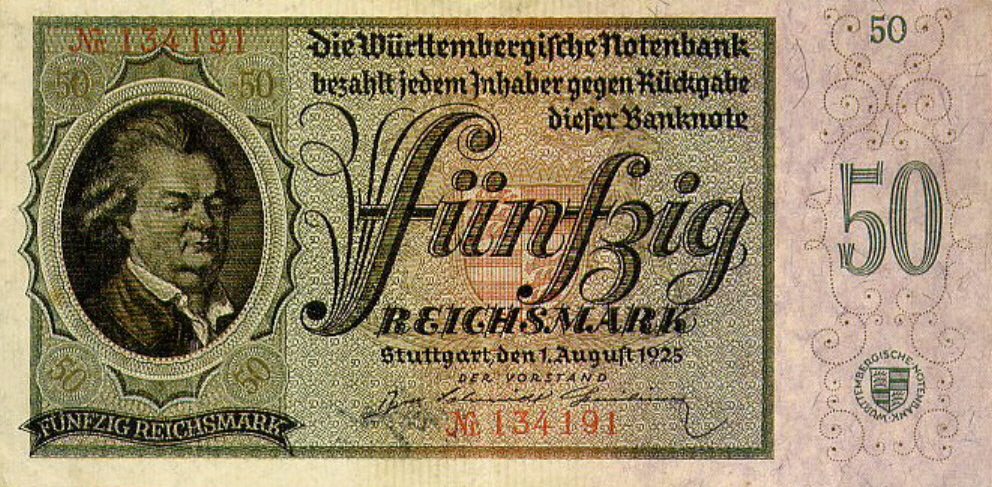
Banknote of the Württembergische Notenbank, 1925

The Württembergische Notenbank (lit. 'Bank of Issue of Württemberg') was a German bank founded in 1871 and based in Stuttgart. It issued its own banknotes until 1935, when it was renamed Württembergische Bank (lit. 'Bank of Württemberg'). In 1978, it merged with the Bank of Baden and private-sector Handels- und Gewerbebank Heilbronn to form Baden-Württembergische Bank, which in turn was merged in 2005 into Landesbank Baden-Württemberg.

== Overview ==
No fewer than seven different projects of creating a central bank for the Kingdom of Württemberg between 1848 and 1866. The decision was precipitated by the founding of the German Empire in 1871, which meant that individual German states would soon lose their right to legislate with regard to the monetary system. Württemberg decided to pre-empt this situation by creating a note-issuing bank before the entry into force of the interdiction to do so. The Württembergische Notenbank was thus authorized by legislation of July 1871, registered on 23 October 1871, and granted a note-issuance privilege on 20 December 1871, less than two weeks before the deadline set by imperial law.

By 1906, the Württembergische Notenbank was one of only four note-issuing banks left aside from the Reichsbank, together with the Bank of Baden, the Bayerische Notenbank, and the Bank of Saxony. In 1923, the State of Württemberg acquired a majority stake of 62 percent of the bank's equity capital. The residual note-issuing privilege was eventually abolished by Nazi legislation of 18 December 1933, coming into force on 31 December 1935. In the postwar period, the bank opened more branches, took over small local banks, and started to expand internationally before approving the merger creating BW-Bank on 21 November 1977.

The bank was established at Friedrichsstrasse 22 in Stuttgart before World War II.

== See also ==
- Hamburger Bank
- Bank of Prussia
- German public banking sector
- List of banks in Germany
