= Rainer Neske =

German banker and business executive

- Born: 7 October 1964 (age 61); Münster, Germany
- Citizenship: German
- Education: University of Karlsruhe
- Occupations: Banker, business executive
- Known for: Chairman and CEO of Landesbank Baden-Württemberg bank

Rainer Neske (1964) is a German banker and business executive. He has been the Chief Executive Officer (CEO) of the Landesbank Baden-Württemberg (LBBW) since 2016.

== Early life and education ==
Neske studied computer science and business administration at the University of Karlsruhe and graduated in 1990.

== Career ==
=== Deutsche Bank (1990–2015) ===
Neske joined Deutsche Bank in 1990 and initially held management roles, including positions connected to the bank’s retail and business-client activities. He was a member of the bank’s Management Board from April 2009 and was responsible for the Private & Business Clients corporate division.

In 2015, Neske stepped down from his role on Deutsche Bank’s management board after disagreeing with the bank’s strategic direction, including plans affecting its retail banking set-up.

=== Landesbank Baden-Württemberg (2016–present) ===
In February 2016, Reuters and German business media reported that Neske would move to LBBW as CEO-designate and succeed Hans-Jörg Vetter. LBBW’s supervisory board appointed him to the managing board effective July 2016, with the CEO transition effective 1 November 2016.

Coverage of his early tenure at LBBW focused on strategy and repositioning priorities. Euromoney described the bank’s strategy under the “new chief executive” and discussed its corporate and international ambitions, as well as capital-markets and fintech themes.

In 2020, regional press reported a contract extension that would keep Neske in office until 2026 and associated his tenure with pushing forward internal transformation themes such as digitisation.

In a 2019 interview, Süddeutsche Zeitung described Neske as head of Germany’s largest Landesbank and noted his 2016 move from Deutsche Bank to the publicly owned LBBW in Stuttgart.

In July 2025, multiple outlets reported that LBBW’s supervisory board extended Neske’s contract by a further five years, through 30 June 2031; LBBW also published a press release confirming the extension.

== Other activities ==
Neske holds several external appointments. He is a member of the board of the Association of German Public Banks (VÖB).

He is a member of the advisory board of Deutsche Vermögensberatung (DVAG). He serves on the Board of Trustees of the Fritz Thyssen Foundation and is listed as its deputy chair. He is chairman of the Board of Trustees of Frankfurt School of Finance & Management.

He is a member of the supervisory board of Save the Children Germany. He is chair of the Board of Trustees of the Friends of the Alte Oper Frankfurt.

== See also ==
- Landesbank Baden-Württemberg
