= Emil von Škoda =

Bohemian engineer and industrialist (1839–1900)

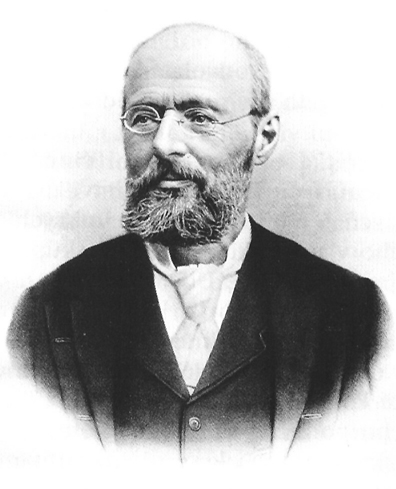
- Born: 18 November 1839; Plzeň, Bohemia, Austrian Empire
- Died: 8 August 1900 (aged 60); Selzthal, Duchy of Styria, Austria-Hungary
- Education: Czech Technical University in Prague Karlsruhe Institute of Technology
- Occupation: Founder of the Škoda Works
- Parents: František Škoda (father); Johanna-Margarethe Říhová (mother)
- Relatives: Joseph Škoda (uncle)

Emil Ritter von Škoda (Czech: Emil rytíř Škoda [ˈɛmɪl ˈrɪciːr̝̊ ˈʃkoda]; 18 November 1839 – 8 August 1900) was a Bohemian engineer and industrialist. Under his ownership, Škoda Works in Plzeň became a major engineering company in Austria-Hungary. Its products ranged from machinery for sugar factories and breweries to steel castings for ships and guns for the Austro-Hungarian armed forces.

He joined Count Ernst von Waldstein-Wartenberg's engineering works as chief engineer in 1866 and bought the factory three years later. He expanded its production of machinery for sugar factories, breweries and other industries. In the 1880s, he built a steelworks whose castings attracted orders from shipbuilders and foreign navies. The company also began making artillery for the Austro-Hungarian army and navy. In 1899, the business became a joint-stock company and Škoda remained its majority shareholder and general director until 1900.

== Early life and education ==
Born in Plzeň on 18 November 1839, Emil Škoda came from a family of physicians. His father František combined medical practice with public office. His uncle Josef was a professor of medicine in Vienna. After attending secondary schools in Prague and Cheb, he studied mechanical engineering in Prague and then in Karlsruhe, where Ferdinand Redtenbacher was among his teachers. He worked at Richard Hartmann’s engineering works in Chemnitz before taking a position as chief engineer in Bremen. The outbreak of the Austro-Prussian War brought him back to Bohemia in 1866.

== Industrial career ==
Later that year, Škoda became chief engineer at Count Ernst von Waldstein-Wartenberg’s factory in Plzeň. He bought the works three years later, in 1869. The acquisition was financed by an inheritance and financial support from his father and uncle. In 1871, he married Hermína Hahnenkammová and invested her dowry in the business.

The works made machinery for sugar factories, breweries, mills and other industries. Škoda enlarged the workshops and foundry and sought customers abroad. He worked with the sugar-industry specialist Hugo Jelínek, who represented the company and developed sugar-processing equipment. Machinery using the Wellner–Jelínek evaporation system found customers in Russia as well as at home.

Between 1884 and 1886, Škoda built a steelworks. He acquired technical licences and recruited experienced specialists to establish production. The quality of its steel castings brought orders from foreign navies and shipbuilders. In 1886, Walter Trappen joined the business to sell its steel and metallurgical products. He became one of Škoda’s closest collaborators.

The company began making guns in the late 1880s and opened an armaments department in 1890. It went on to supply guns and armoured turrets for Austro-Hungarian fortifications and warships. By 1899, it employed about 3,000 people.

Škoda borrowed from banks in Prague and Vienna to expand the factory. By the late 1890s, the business was in financial difficulty and needed more capital. In December 1899, he converted the business into a joint-stock company with capital of 25 million crowns. He kept a majority of the shares and served as president and general director. The banks also gained seats on the board.

== Personal life and public activities ==
Škoda and Hermína had four children: Josefina, Johanna, Hermína and Karel. His title of knight came through his father, who was ennobled in 1867 together with his direct descendants.

Škoda set up a pension association in 1893 for the company’s salaried staff and foremen, along with funds for sick workers and their families. He was also vice-president of the Prague Iron Industry Company and a board member of the Austrian Lloyd shipping company. In 1899, he was appointed to the Austrian House of Lords for life.

== Death ==
Škoda died on 8 August 1900 aboard a train near Selzthal in Austria, on his way home from Bad Gastein. He was buried in St Nicholas Cemetery in Plzeň. Walter Trappen succeeded him as general director. His son Karel inherited the principal shareholding, but did not become general director until 1909.
