= Jan S. Hesthaven =

Danish mathematician

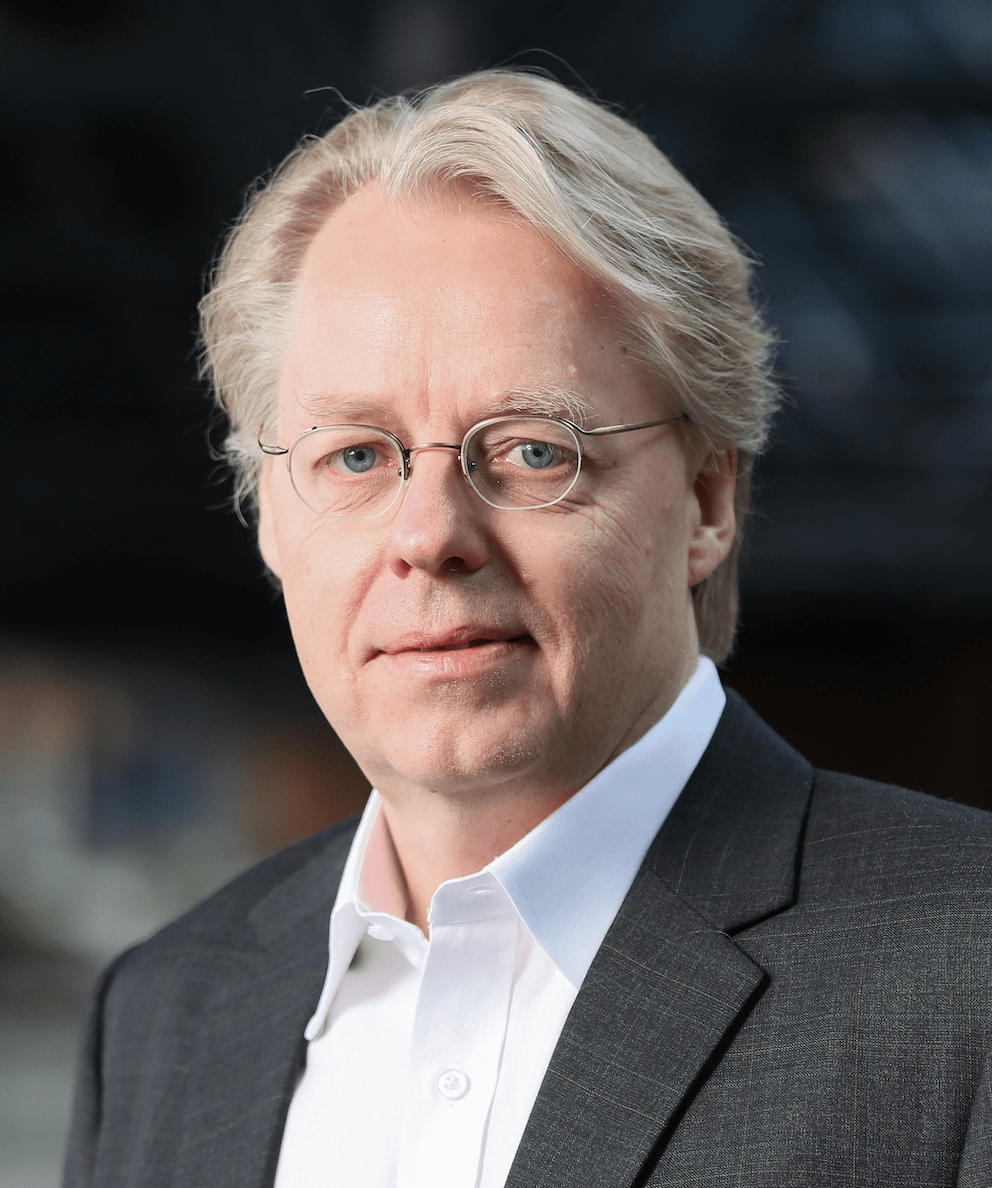
- Prof. Jan S. Hesthaven, circa 2019
- Education: Technical University of Denmark
- Awards: Philip J. Bray Award for Teaching Excellence (2004); SIAM Fellow (2014); Royal Danish Academy of Sciences and Letters Fellow (2022); AMS Fellow (2023); Academia Europaea Fellow (2023); European Academy of Sciences Fellow 2023; Honorary degree Dr.h.c, DTU, 2024
- Scientific career
- Fields: Computational methods for time-dependent partial differential equations
- Workplaces: Technical University of Denmark; Brown University; Ecole Polytechnique Federale de Lausanne; Karlsruhe Institute of Technology (KIT)
- Website: www.kit.edu/eb/president.php

Jan Sickmann Hesthaven (born 10 December 1965) is a Danish mathematician, currently president of the Karlsruhe Institute of Technology. He was previously Vice President for Academic Affairs (starting in 2021) at EPFL (École polytechnique fédérale de Lausanne) and held the Chair of Computational Mathematics and Simulation Science (MCSS). He is particularly known for contributions to the development, analysis and application of high-order accurate computational methods for time-dependent partial differential equations. He has also contributed substantially to the development of reduced order models and the application of neural networks and machine learning techniques to problems in science and engineering.

== Career ==
Hesthaven obtained a Master of Science degree in computational physics from the Technical University of Denmark (DTU) in 1991. In 1995, he received a PhD in numerical analysis from the Institute of Mathematical Modelling (DTU) and in 2009 he was awarded the degree of Dr.Techn. from DTU for substantial and lasting contributions that has helped to move his research area forward and penetrated into applications.

After graduation, he was appointed in 1995 as Visiting Assistant Professor at Brown University, then in 1999 as assistant professor and in 2003 he was promoted associate professor of applied mathematics with tenure at Brown University where in July 2005 he was promoted to professor of applied mathematics.

In 2006, Hesthaven founded the Center for Computation and Visualization (CCV) at Brown University and was its director until 2013.

He served from Aug 2010 to June 2013 as founding deputy director of the Institute of Computational and Experimental Research in Mathematics ICERM, an NSF Mathematical Sciences Research Institute.

In 2013, he joined EPFL (École polytechnique fédérale de Lausanne) where he was appointed full professor of computational mathematics and simulation science, and shortly later, in February 2014, he founded the new unit of Scientific IT and Application Support (SCITAS)

From 2016 to 2021 Hesthaven served as Editor in Chief of SIAM Journal of Scientific Computing.

In February 2017, he became dean of the School of Basic Sciences (SB). In September 2020, he was appointed as Vice President for Academic Affairs at EPFL for a term starting in 2021.

In January 2024, he was elected as the future president of the German Karlsruhe Institute of Technology (KIT) by the supervisory board. The election was confirmed by the Senate on 19 February 2024. He has assumed the presidency as of 1 October 2024.

== Recognition ==
Brown University gave him their Philip J. Bray Award for Teaching Excellence in 2004. He was elected as a SIAM Fellow in 2014. He was named to the 2023 class of Fellows of the American Mathematical Society, "for contributions to computational methods for PDEs, high-order accurate methods, and the reduced order method".

In 2022 he was inducted as member of the Royal Danish Academy of Sciences and Letters. In 2023, he was elected as a member of Academia Europaea and the European Academy of Sciences.

In 2024, the Technical University of Denmark awarded him an honorary doctorate in recognition of his scientific contributions

== Books ==
- Hesthaven, Jan. (2007). Spectral methods for time-dependent problems. Gottlieb, Sigal., Gottlieb, David. Cambridge: Cambridge University Press. ISBN 978-0-511-26107-7. OCLC 162144521.
- Hesthaven, Jan S. (2008). Nodal discontinuous Galerkin methods: algorithms, analysis, and applications. Warburton, Tim. New York: Springer. ISBN 978-0-387-72067-8. OCLC 233971312.
- Hesthaven, Jan S. (2016). Certified reduced basis methods for parametrized partial differential equations. Rozza, Gianluigi, Stamm, Benjamin. Cham: Springer. ISBN 978-3-319-22470-1. OCLC 919086945.
- Hesthaven, Jan S. (2018). Numerical methods for conservation laws: from analysis to algorithms. Philadelphia: Society for Industrial and Applied Mathematics. ISBN 978-1-61197-509-3. OCLC 1012713065.
