= Joseph Škoda =

Czech-Austrian dermatologist, internist and university educator

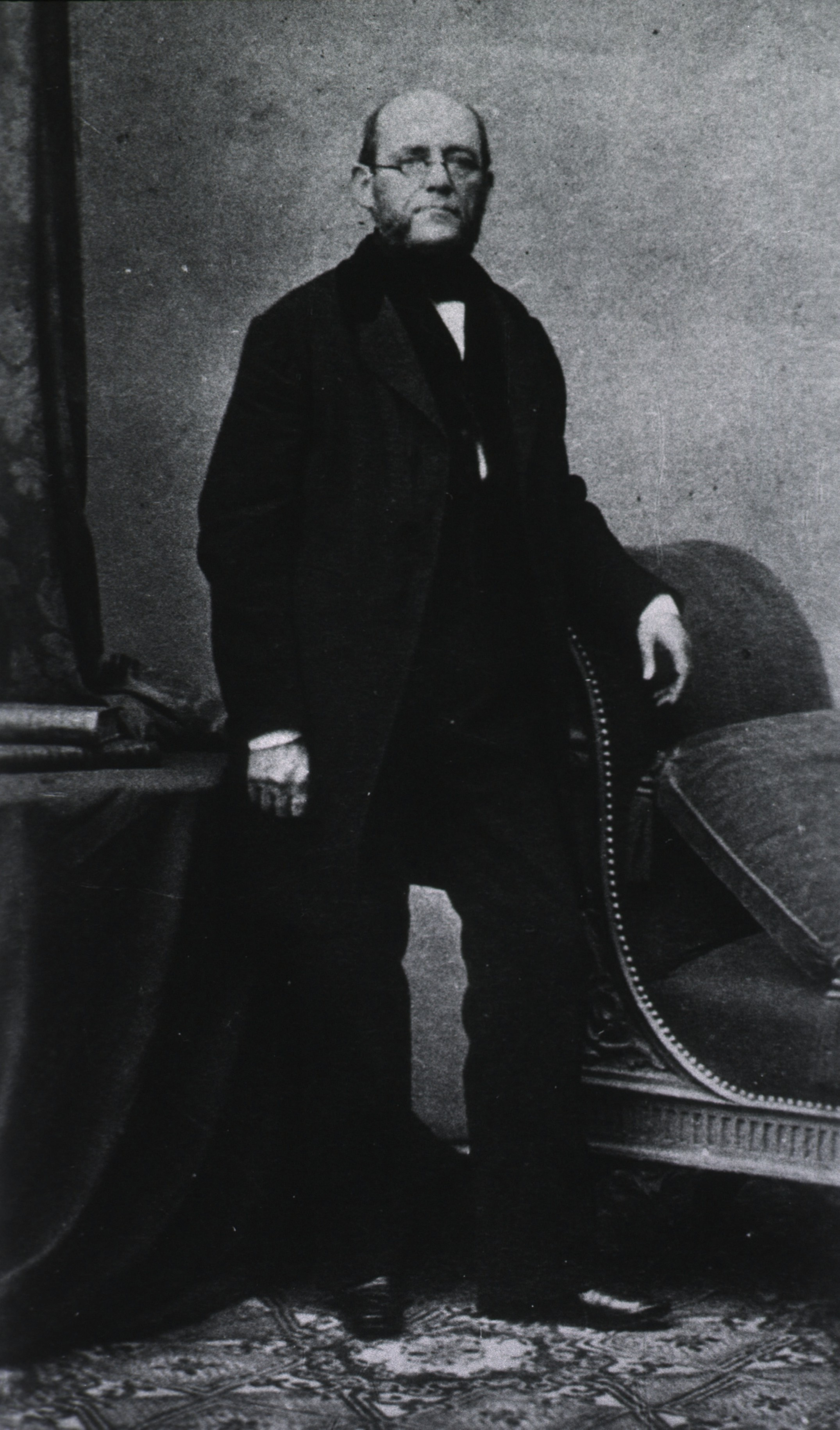
- Joseph Škoda
- Born: 10 December 1805; Plzeň, Bohemia, Austrian Empire
- Died: 13 June 1881 (aged 75); Vienna, Austria-Hungary
- Scientific career
- Fields: Internal medicine

Joseph Škoda (German: Josef Skoda, Czech: Josef Škoda; 10 December 1805 – 13 June 1881) was a Czech-Austrian medical doctor, medical professor and dermatologist. Together with Carl Freiherr von Rokitansky, he was the founder of the Modern Medical School of Vienna.

== Life ==
Škoda was born on 10 December 1805 in Plzeň (German: Pilsen), Kingdom of Bohemia, Austrian Empire. His father was Jan Vojtěch Škoda, a locksmith, and his mother was Anna Škodová (née Smyčková). He had three brothers. He attended the gymnasium at Plzeň. From 1825 to 1831, he atudied at the University of Vienna in 1825, where he received the degree of Doctor of Medicine.

In the next two years, Škoda served in Plzeň, Kouřim and Chrudim in Bohemia as a medical doctor during the outbreak of cholera. In 1832–1838, he was assistant doctor in the Vienna General Hospital. In 1839, he was city physician of Vienna for the poor. On 13 February 1840, on the recommendation of Ludwig Freiherr von Türkheim, chairman of the Imperial Committee of Education, he was appointed to the unpaid position of chief doctor of the department for tuberculosis just opened in the general hospital.

In 1846, thanks to the energetic measures of Carl von Rokitansky, professor of pathological anatomy, he was appointed professor of the medical clinic against the wishes of the rest of the medical faculty. In 1848 he began to lecture in German instead of Latin, being the first professor to do so. On 17 July 1848, he was elected an active member of the mathematico-physical section of the Austrian Academy of Sciences. In Vienna in 1851, Škoda treated Petar II Petrovic Njegos, who was suffering from tuberculosis.

Early in 1871, he retired from his professorship; the occasion was celebrated by the students and the population of Vienna by a great torchlight procession in his honour. He died in Vienna. Rokitansky called him "a light for those who study, a model for those who strive, and a rock for those who despair". Škoda's benevolent disposition is best shown by the fact that, notwithstanding his large income and the known simplicity of his lifestyle, he left a comparatively small fortune, and in his will, bequeathed legacies to a number of benevolent institutions.

Joseph Škoda was an uncle to the industrialist Emil Škoda.

== Works ==
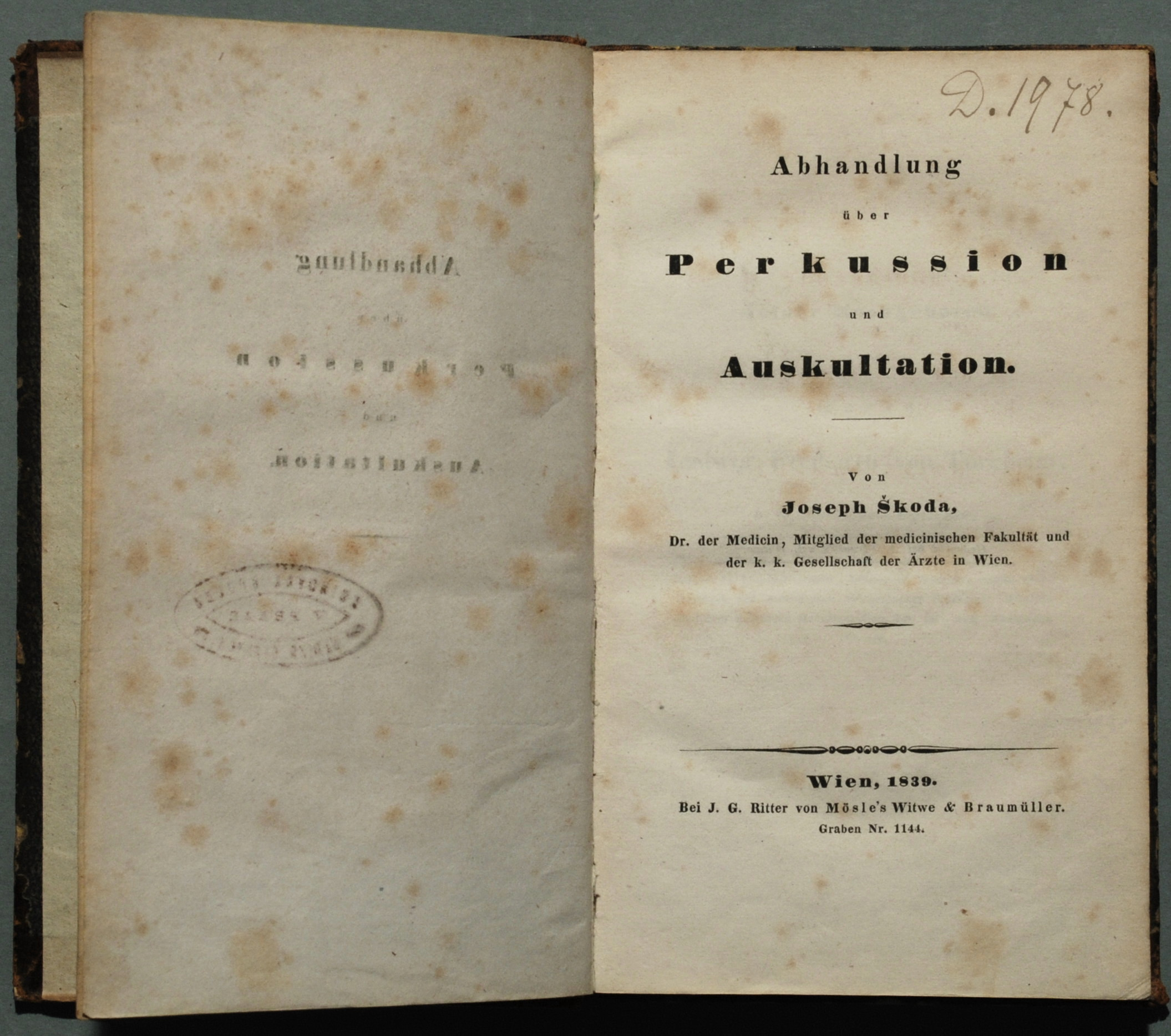
Škoda's chief work, Abhandlung über die Perkussion und Auskultation

Škoda's great merit lies in his development of the methods of physical investigation for diagnosis in medicine. The discovery of the method of percussion diagnosis made in 1761 by the Viennese medical doctor, Leopold Auenbrugger (1722–1809), had been forgotten, and the knowledge of it was first revived in 1808 by the Frenchman Jean-Nicolas Corvisart (1755–1821), court physician to Napoleon I. René Laennec (1787–1826) and his pupils Pierre Adolphe Piorry (1794–1879) and Jean-Baptiste Bouillaud (1796–1881) added auscultation to this method. Škoda began his clinical studies in close connexion with pathological anatomy while assistant doctor of the hospital, but his superiors failed to understand his course, and in 1837, by way of punishment, transferred him to the ward for the insane, as it was claimed that the patients were annoyed by his investigations, especially by the method of percussion.

Škoda's publications, all in the Medizinische Jahrbücher des k.k. österreichen Kaiserstaates, included:

- Über die Perkussion ("About Percussion"), in vol. IX (1836)
- Über den Herzstoss und die durch die Herzbewegungen verursachten Töne und über die Anwendung der Perkussion bei Untersuchung der Organe des Unterleibes ("About the Percussion of the Heart and the Sounds Originated by Heart Movements, and Its Application to the Investigation of Organs of the Abdomen"), in vols. XIII, XIV (1837)
- Über Abdominaltyphus und dessen Behandlung mit Alumen crudum ("About Abdominal Typhus and Its Treatment with Alumen"), in vol. XV (1838)
- Untersuchungsmethode zur Bestimmung des Zustandes des Herzens ("Methods of Investigation of the Conditions of the Heart"), in vol. XVIII (1839)
- Über Pericarditis in pathologisch-anatomischer und diagnostischer Beziehung ("About Pericarditis in Pathological Anatomic and Diagnostic Relationships"), in vol XIX (1839)
- Über Piorrys Semiotik und Diagnostik ("About Piorry's Semiotic and Diagnostics"), in vol. XVIII (1839)
- Über die Diagnose der Herzklappenfehler ("About the Diagnosis of Defects of Heart Valves"), in vol. XXI (1840).

His small, but for many years afterwards, unsurpassed chief work, Abhandlung über die Perkussion und Auskultation (Vienna, 1839), was repeatedly published and translated into foreign languages and established his universal renown as a diagnostician.

In 1841, after a journey for research to Paris, he made a separate division in his department for skin diseases and thus gave the first impulse towards the reorganization of dermatology by Ferdinand von Hebra. In 1848 at the request of the Ministry of Education he drew up a memorial on the reorganization of medical education, and encouraged later by his advice the founding of the present higher administration of the Medical School of Vienna. As regards therapeutics the accusation was often made against him that he held to the "nihilism" of the Vienna School. As a matter of fact his therapeutics were exceedingly simple in contrast to the great variety of remedial agents used at that time, which he regarded as useless, as in his experience many ailments were cured without medicines, merely by suitable medical supervision and proper diet.

His high sense of duty as a teacher, the large amount of work he performed as a medical doctor and the early appearance of heart disease are probably the reasons that from 1848 he published less and less. The few papers which he wrote from 1850 are to be found in the transactions of the Academy of Sciences and the periodical of the Society of Physicians of Vienna of which he was the honorary president.
