= Alexander Lytchak =

German mathematician (born 1978)

- Born: 28 November 1978 (age 47); Leningrad
- Education: University of Bonn
- Scientific career
- Fields: Mathematics
- Workplaces: Karlsruhe Institute of Technology; University of Cologne; University of Bonn
- Thesis: Allgemeine Theorie der Submetrien und verwandte mathematische Probleme (2001)
- Doctoral advisor: Werner Ballmann

Alexander Lytchak is a German mathematician and a professor of mathematics at the Karlsruhe Institute of Technology. He is known for his work in differential and metric geometry and also as a chess player.

== Life and career ==
Alexander Lytchak was born in 1978 in Leningrad. As a school student, he participated in the Russian mathematical olympiads and in the German national mathematics competition, the Bundeswettbewerb Mathematik. He studied mathematics at the University of Bonn. He earned his PhD in 2001 under the supervision of Werner Ballmann.

In 2012, he was appointed professor of mathematics at the University of Cologne. He later joined the Karlsruhe Institute of Technology.

== Awards and honours ==
- von Kaven Award for Mathematics (2009).
