= Landesbank Baden-Württemberg =

German commercial bank

- Type: Public bank
- Industry: Financial services
- Predecessor: Landeskreditbank Baden-Württemberg; Württembergische Landessparkasse
- Founded: 1 January 1999
- Headquarters: Stuttgart, Germany
- Key people: Rainer Neske
- Products: Investment banking, Commercial banking, Retail banking, Private banking, Asset management
- Total assets: ▲€369.027 billion (Q1 2025)
- Total equity: ▲€16.10 billion (2023)
- Owner: Savings bank Association of Baden-Wuerttemberg (41%); Baden-Württemberg (25%); Stuttgart (19%); Landesbeteiligungen Baden-Württemberg (14%); Landeskreditbank Baden-Württemberg (2%)
- Number of employees: 10,434 (December 31, 2023)
- Website: lbbw.de

Landesbank Baden-Württemberg (lit. 'Baden-Württemberg State Bank', LBBW) is a universal bank and the Landesbank for some Federal States of Germany (Baden-Württemberg, Rheinland-Pfalz, Sachsen). As of 2018, it is Germany's biggest state-backed landesbank lender.

LBBW is a full-service and commercial bank and central bank for savings banks in Baden-Württemberg, Rhineland-Palatinate and Saxony. The company focuses on industrial technologies, information technology, software, telecommunication, innovative services and life science. It prefers to invest in Southern Germany, but also considers investments in other regions of Germany, Austria and Switzerland.

LBBW has been designated as a Significant Institution since the entry into force of European Banking Supervision in late 2014, and as a consequence is directly supervised by the European Central Bank.

== History ==
On 1 January 1999, Landesbank Baden-Württemberg (LBBW) was formed through the merger of SüdwestLB, Landesgirokasse, and the commercial banking business of L-Bank.

On 1 August 2005, Baden Württembergische Bank (BW-Bank) was incorporated into LBBW as a legally dependent institution under public law. Also as a legally dependent institution under public law, the former Landesbank Rheinland-Pfalz was integrated in the LBBW Group on 1 July 2008 under the new name Rheinland-Pfalz Bank. In 2007, the state governor of Baden-Württemberg, Günther Oettinger, announced that LBBW would pay an initial 250 million euros, or $342 million, for its competitor Sachsen LB; on 1 April 2008, LBBW re-organized its activities in Central Germany (Thuringia, Saxony-Anhalt and Saxony) under the umbrella of Sachsen Bank.

By the 2008 financial crisis, LBBW had already grown to become the biggest and strongest of Germany's seven remaining independent public Landesbanken. It nonetheless had to take a state bailout of 5 billion euros. and reduced its portfolio of toxic assets to 3 billion euros by 2014 from 95 billion in 2008. Similar to other public lenders, it opted for support from its regional state owner instead of drawing on help from SoFFin, the federal government's bail-out scheme. By 2009, the European Commission approved a restructuring plan which had the institution focus on its core regional banking businesses, curtail capital market and proprietary trading activities and shrink its balance sheet.

In 2019, LBBW became one of six banks to be mandated by the Islamic Development Bank (IsDB) to raise $1.5 billion in five-year sukuk.

== Assets ==
LBBW holds shares in various subsidiaries, including the following:

- LBBW Asset Management
- MKB Mittelrheinische Bank
- Südfactoring
- Südleasing
- HSBC Trinkaus & Burkhardt (18.7%)

== Controversy ==
In late 2009, state prosecutors raided the Stuttgart headquarters of LBBW as part of an investigation into alleged breaches of trust in connection with the bank's subprime investments. Several managers were later tried on accounting charges.

In 2015, an LBBW subsidiary in Switzerland agreed with the U.S. Department of Justice to pay a penalty of $34,000 to avoid possible prosecution for helping U.S. account holders conceal assets from the Internal Revenue Service and evade taxes. The subsidiary, LBBW (Schweiz) in Zürich, had previously held 35 U.S.-related accounts with $128 million in assets under management since August 2008.

Another LBBW subsidiary, LBBW Luxemburg S.A., is engaged in litigation against the American bank Wells Fargo as of 2012.

== See also ==
- Bank of Baden
- Württembergische Notenbank
- German public banking sector
- List of banks in the euro area
- List of banks in Germany
