= Ferdinand Redtenbacher =

Austrian mechanical engineer

Ferdinand Jakob Redtenbacher (July 25, 1809 in Steyr, Upper Austria – April 16, 1863 in Karlsruhe) is regarded as the founder of science-based mechanical engineering.

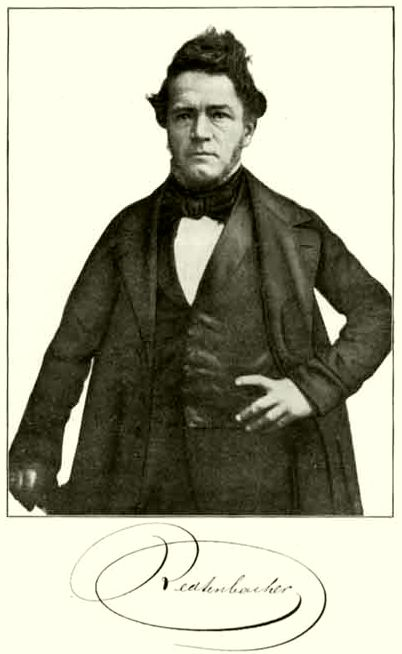
Portrait

== Life ==
Redtenbacher, son of an ironmonger from Steyr, first went through an apprenticeship in commerce and accounting. After a short interlude as a technical illustrator in the "Baudirektion" (building authority) in Linz, he attended the Polytechnikum in Vienna from 1825 until 1829. He stayed there until 1834 as an assistant to Johann Arzberger. In 1835, he accepted an invitation to become a professor at the Höhere Industrieschule in Zürich, where he taught mathematics and geometry. In 1841 he finally became a professor in mechanics and mechanical engineering at the Polytechnikum Karlsruhe.

In 1857 Redtenbacher became director of the entire Polytechnic School and was re-elected annually thereafter. At the same time he held the only professorship at the mechanical-technical school. He was the director of Polytechnikum Karlsruhe between 1857 and 1862, transforming it into a school of international standing.

In 1859, this school was renamed the mechanical engineering school and a new building initiated and designed by Redtenbacher was opened on the former riding arena of the dragoon barracks. After 1860 the number of students fell again, which can be explained by Redtenbacher's stomach illness and his irritation and differences with his professor colleagues. According to a contemporary report, his art of presentation had not been the same since 1859.

== Influence ==
Redtenbacher is regarded as the founder of scientific mechanical engineering. Working at the Polytechnikum Karlsruhe, he added a mathematical foundation to the previously empirical teaching. His students include such outstanding engineers as Karl Benz, Franz Reuleaux and Emil Škoda.

== Works (original titles in German) ==
- Theorie und Bau der Turbinen und Ventilatoren, Mannheim 1844
- Resultate für den Maschinenbau, Mannheim 1844
- Theorie und Bau der Wasser-Räder, Mannheim 1846
- Principien der Mechanik, Mannheim 1852
- Die Luftexpansions-Maschine, Mannheim 1853
- Die calorische Maschine, Mannheim
- Die Gesetze des Lokomotiv-Baues, Mannheim 1855
- Das Dynamiden-System, Mannheim 1857
- Der Maschinbau, Mannheim 1862
