= Bank of Baden =

Former German bank

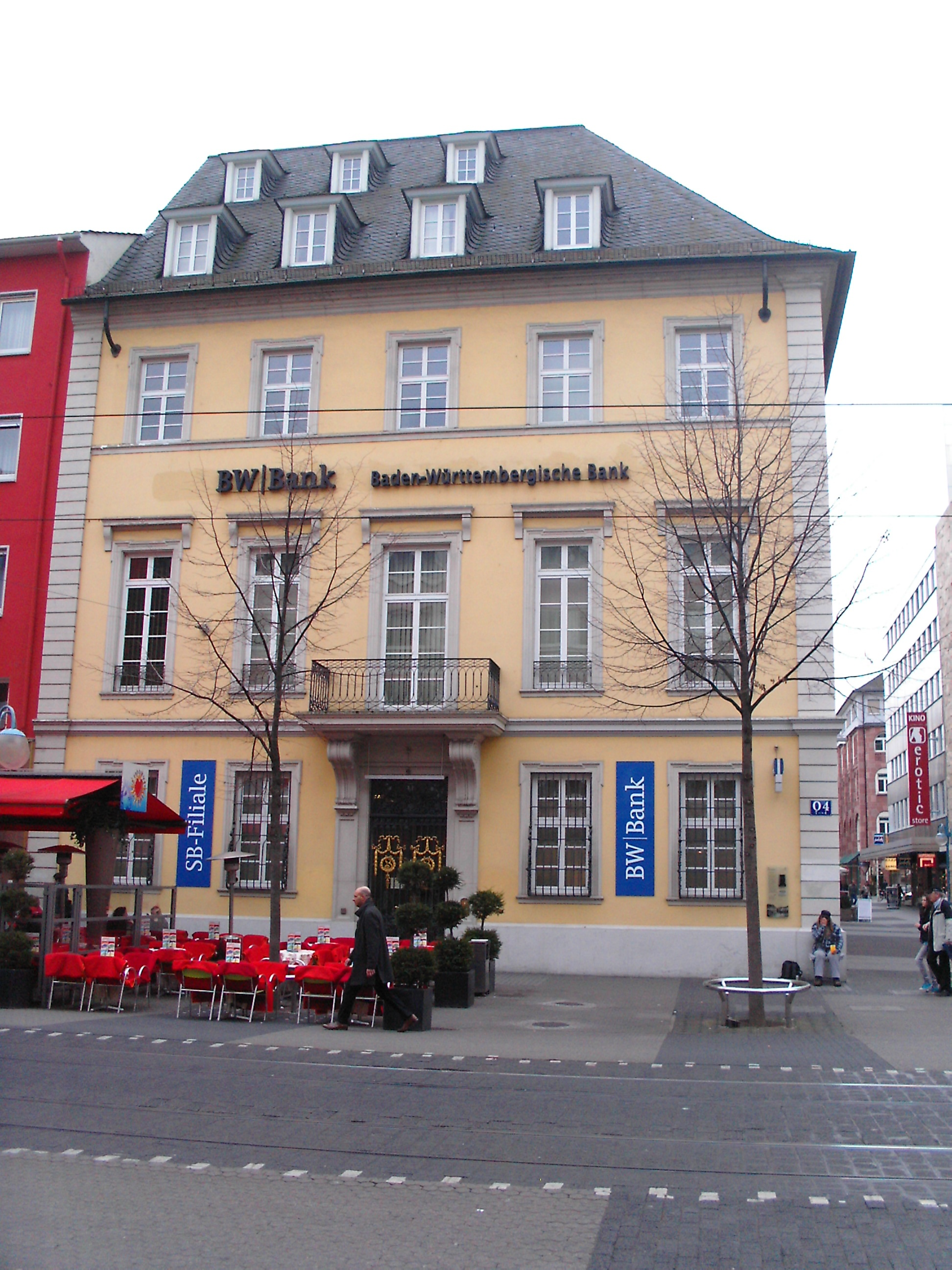
Former head office of the Bank of Baden (until 1932) in Mannheim, rebuilt in the 1970s

The Bank of Baden (German: Badische Bank) was a German public bank of issue founded in 1870, based in Mannheim until 1932 and from that date in Karlsruhe. It issued its own banknotes until 1935. In 1978, it merged with Württembergische Bank and private-sector Handelsbank Heilbronn to form Baden-Württembergische Bank, which in turn was merged in 2005 into Landesbank Baden-Württemberg.

== Overview ==
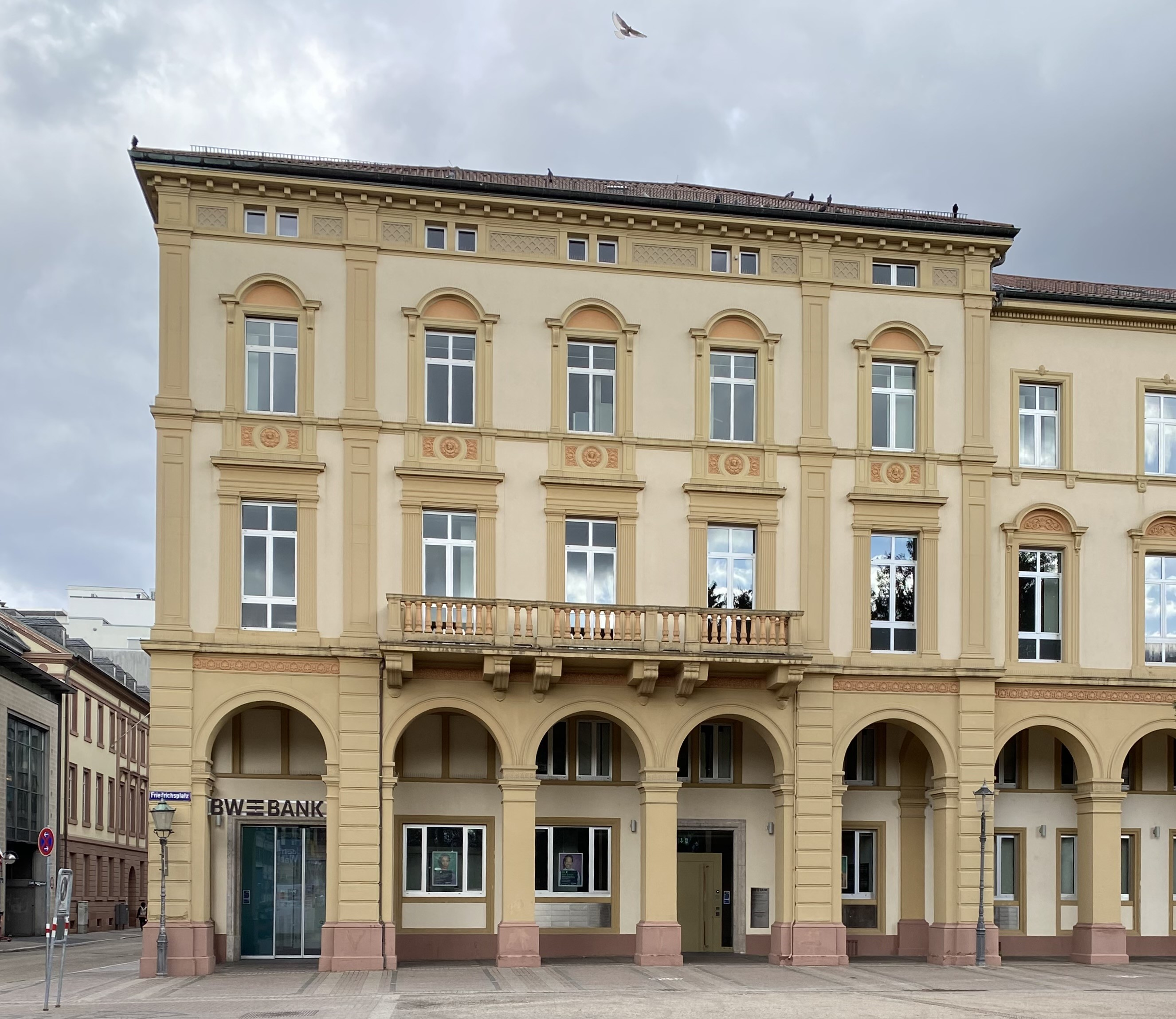
Former head office of the Bank of Baden after 1932 in Karlsruhe, previously the seat of Privatbank Straus & Co.

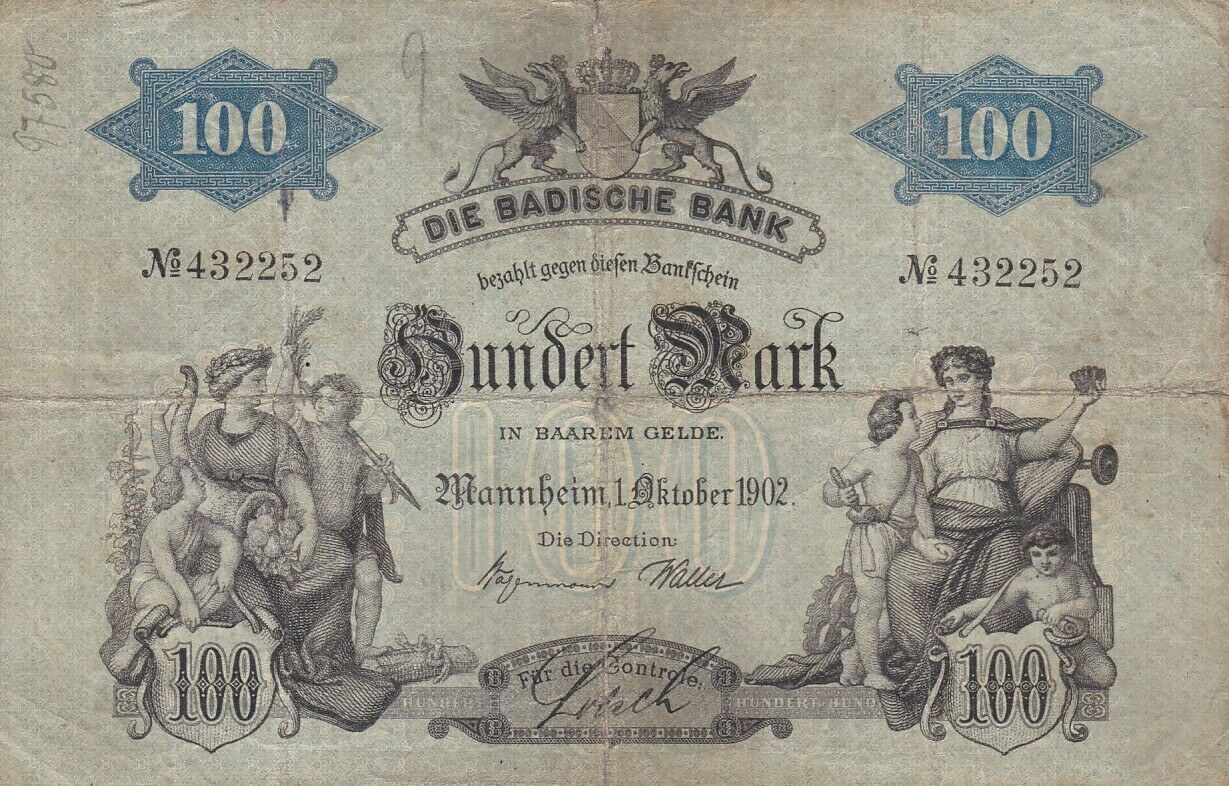
Banknote issued by the Bank of Baden, 1902

Following discussions about the establishment of a central bank going at least as far back as 1844, the Grand Duchy of Baden was prompted into action by the momentum of German unification. It received its banking license from the Grand-Ducal government on 25 March 1870. The government was a shareholder alongside private bankers from Baden, Adolf von Hansemann of the Berlin-based Disconto-Gesellschaft, and Baron Carl von Rothschild of the Frankfurt-based M. A. Rothschild & Söhne. The capital amounted to 10,500,000 guilders (6,000,000 thalers) divided into 30,000 shares of 350 guilders (or 200 thalers). A branch opened in Karlsruhe as early as 1871.

The bank had the right to issue banknotes up to three times the paid-in capital. The cover of the notes in circulation was one-third in silver and two-thirds in gold or foreign exchange. In return for the issuance privilege, the bank was obliged to distribute a fifth of its profits to the Grand-Ducal government after deducting a 5 percent dividend. This state share rose from 2,626.80 gold marks in 1880 to 22,885 marks in 1890.

On 1 December 1870 the Badische Bank issued 10-guilder notes, and on 1 July 1871, 50-guilder notes. The note circulation was 11,370,000 guilders in 1871 and rose to 30,276,000 guilders by 1874. After the Reich-wide introduction of the mark currency, 100-mark notes followed in 1874, 1890, 1902, 1907 and 1918. All of these banknotes were printed by Dondorf & Naumann in Frankfurt.

During the inflation period in the early 1920s, the Bank of Baden issued banknotes with denominations of 500 marks (on August 1, 1922), 5,000 marks, 10,000 marks, 500,000 marks, 1 million marks, 20 million marks, 2 billion marks and 100 billion marks within just over a year (on October 30, 1923). In October 1924 it again issued banknotes for 50 Reichsmarks.

In 1920, the Republic of Baden became a shareholder of the bank, and in 1931 it acquired a block of shares from Deutsche Bank that brought it to majority ownership with 70 percent of equity capital. The next year, it relocated its head office to Karlsruhe. In 1934 the National Socialist government abolished the note-issuance privilege. The bank subsequently expanded as a regular commercial bank. In 1937, it acquired the Carl Trautwein Bank in Freiburg im Breisgau.

== See also ==
- Hamburger Bank
- Bank of Prussia
- German public banking sector
- List of banks in Germany
