= Oststadt =

Oststadt may refer to:

- Oststadt (Karlsruhe), a borough of Karlsruhe
- Hanover-Mitte § Oststadt, a borough of Hannover
