= Fritz Görnnert =

German engineer and SA general (1907–1984)

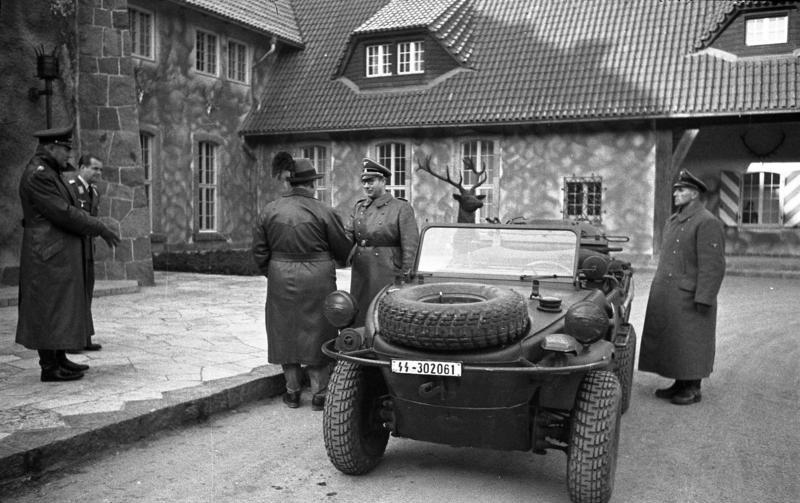
- Fritz Görnnert (second from left) at Carinhall with Hermann Göring (center, back to camera) c. 1942–1945

Ministerialdirigent Reich Aviation Ministry
- In office 1 January 1944 – 8 May 1945
- Minister: Hermann Göring

Ministerialrat Reich Aviation Ministry
- In office 1 April 1940 – 31 December 1943

Personal Adjutant Reich Aviation Ministry
- In office 1 January 1937 – 8 May 1945

Personal details
- Born: 18 March 1907 Karlsruhe, Grand Duchy of Baden, German Empire
- Died: 1 May 1984 (aged 77) Karlsruhe, West Germany
- Resting place: Hauptfriedhof Karlsruhe
- Party: Nazi Party
- Education: Heidelberg University; Technical College of Karlsruhe
- Profession: Engineer

Military service
- Allegiance: Nazi Germany
- Branch/service: Luftwaffe
- Years of service: 1940–1945
- Rank: Oberst
- Battles/wars: World War II

Friedrich "Fritz" Görnnert (18 March 1907 – 1 May 1984) was a German engineer who, during Nazi Germany, was a personal adjutant to Reichsmarschall Hermann Göring from January 1937 until Göring's capture in May 1945. He also was a civil servant in the Reich Aviation Ministry with the rank of Ministerialdirigent and an SA-Brigadeführer in the Nazi Party paramilitary organization, the Sturmabteilung (SA).

== Early life and education ==
Görnnert was born in Karlsruhe in 1907. After attending the local Gymnasium and obtaining his Abitur, he studied mathematics and sciences at Heidelberg University from 1927 to 1928, and mechanical engineering and aircraft-construction at the Technical College of Karlsruhe (today, Karlsruhe Institute of Technology) from 1928 to 1933. He was active in the National Socialist German Students' League and was awarded a doctorate in engineering from Karlsruhe in 1939. He was an assistant to Professor Töpfer, who held the chair of aircraft construction at Karlsruhe.

== Nazi Party career ==
Görnnert joined the Nazi Party in 1931 while still a student (membership number 411,588). He joined the Sturmabteilung (SA) in 1933, eventually attaining the rank of SA-Brigadeführer. After his studies, he worked as an instructor at the SA-Reichsführerschule (SA Reich Leadership School). He entered the Reich Aviation Ministry in January 1937, where he became a personal adjutant to Reichsminister Hermann Göring. During the Second World War, he joined the Luftwaffe on 1 April 1940 where he attained the rank of Oberst. At that time, he also was named as a Ministerialrat (ministerial councilor) in the ministry, advancing to Ministerialdirigent (ministerial conductor) on 1 January 1944. He was made an honorary citizen of the Karlsruhe Technical University in 1941. Toward the end of the war, with the Red Army approaching Göring's Carinhall country estate northeast of Berlin, Görnnert was placed in charge of evacuating much of Göring's looted artworks aboard a special train headed to Berchtesgaden but which was diverted to Veldenstein Castle, Göring's residence in Neuhaus an der Pegnitz near Nuremberg.

== Post-war life ==
At the end of the war in Europe, Görnnert was captured by American forces in May 1945. He was interned but was not charged with war crimes. He submitted an affidavit in defense of Viktor Brack, who was tried and convicted of war crimes and crimes against humanity in the Doctors' Trial at Nuremberg. After his release from confinement in 1947, Görnnert returned to live in Karlsruhe where he died in 1984.
