= Hauptfriedhof =

Hauptfriedhof may refer to:

- Hauptfriedhof Karlsruhe, a cemetery in Karlsruhe, Germany
- Hauptfriedhof Ohlsdorf, a cemetery in Ohlsdorf, Germany
- Hauptfriedhof Frankfurt, a cemetery in Frankfurt, Germany
