= Oststadt (Karlsruhe) =

District of Karlsruhe

- Borough of Karlsruhe
- Coat of arms

- Location of Oststadt within Karlsruhe
- Interactive map of Oststadt
- Location within Germany Location within Baden-Württemberg
- Coordinates: 49°0′N 8°25′E
- Country: Germany
- State: Baden-Württemberg
- District: Urban district
- City: Karlsruhe

Area
  - Total: 5.1859 km^{2} (2.0023 sq mi)

Population (2014-06-30)
  - Total: 21,091
  - Density: 4,067.0/km^{2} (10,533/sq mi)
- Time zone: UTC+01:00 (CET)
  - Summer (DST): UTC+02:00 (CEST)
- Dialling codes: 0721

Oststadt (German pronunciation: [ˈɔstˌʃtat], lit. 'East City') is the eastern district of Karlsruhe. It is located east of the Durlacher Tor, which borders the city center, and borders the Durlach district to the east.

== History ==
At the end of the 19th century, the city of Karlsruhe opened up parts of today's Oststadt as a building area. To this day, the district is characterized by its coexistence of trade, crafts and living.

The area south of Durlacher Allee, the Gottesaue, has a much older history. The Benedictine monastery Gottesaue was founded here in 1094. After its secularization during the Reformation in the 16th century, the Gottesaue Palace was built in its place, which was rebuilt between 1982 and 1989 and now serves as the home of the State University of Music.

== Tourist attractions ==
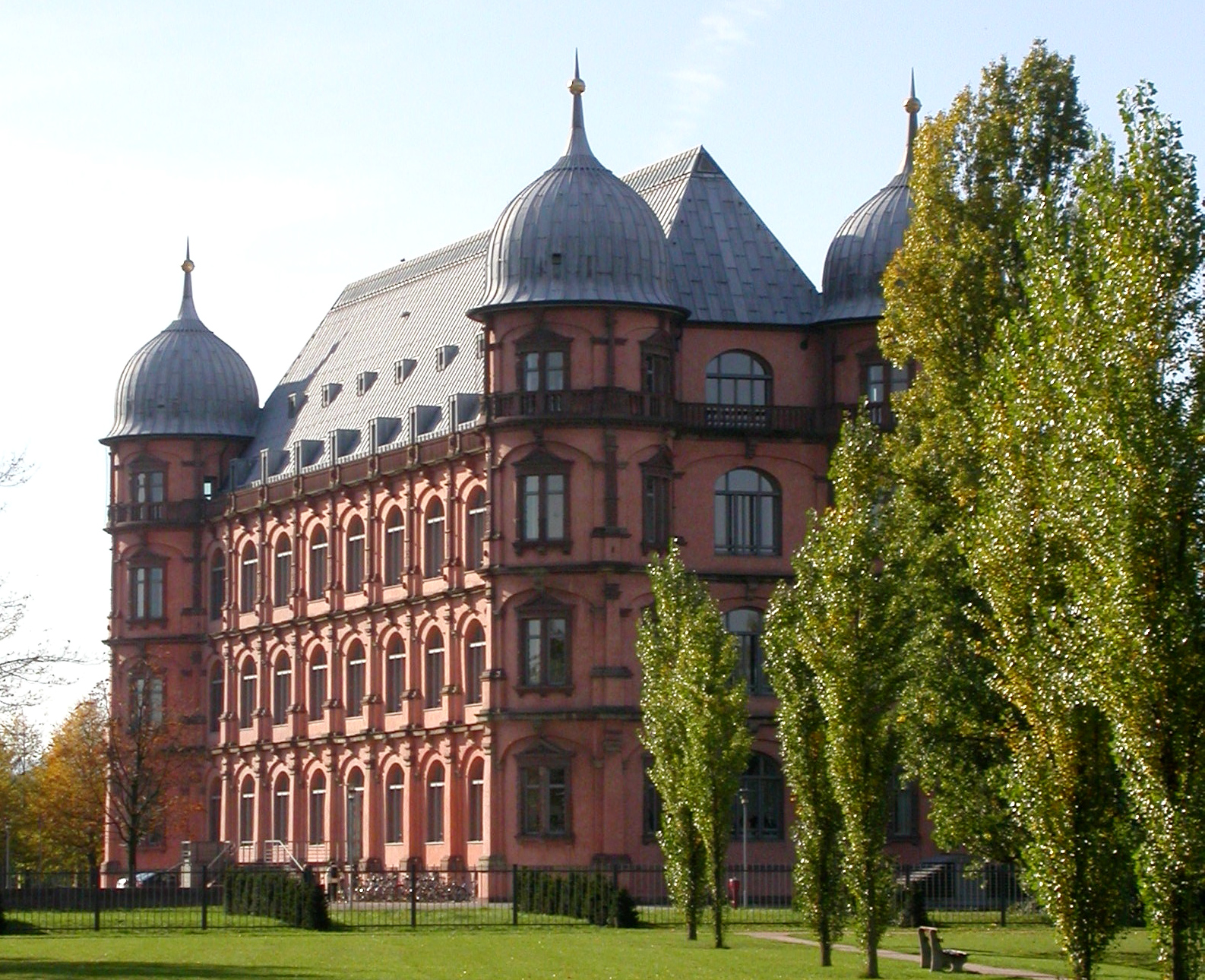
Gottesaue Palace

Sights in the eastern part of Karlsruhe include the Gottesaue Palace which is a music academy now, the old cemetery on Kapellenstrasse, the Hauptfriedhof as the oldest German rural cemetery, several Art Nouveau streets, the botanical garden of the University of Karlsruhe KIT, the Franz Lust Children's Clinic (formerly Victoria Pensionat and Girls' School; no longer a children's clinic since July 2003, since 2006 the headquarters of the academic international office of the University of Karlsruhe), the old Jewish cemetery on Kriegsstraße, the Alter Schlachthof and the Hoepfner castle. There are also some notable church buildings, including the neo-Gothic Catholic parish church of St. Bernhard, the Art Nouveau-style Evangelical Luther church, the chapel at the old cemetery, which is considered the smallest Evangelical Lutheran church in Germany, and the mausoleum of the grand ducal burial chapel Großherzogliche Grabkapelle in the Fasanengarten.
