= Hauptfriedhof Karlsruhe =

Cemetery in Karlsruhe, Germany

Coordinates: 49.017462°N 8.435429°E

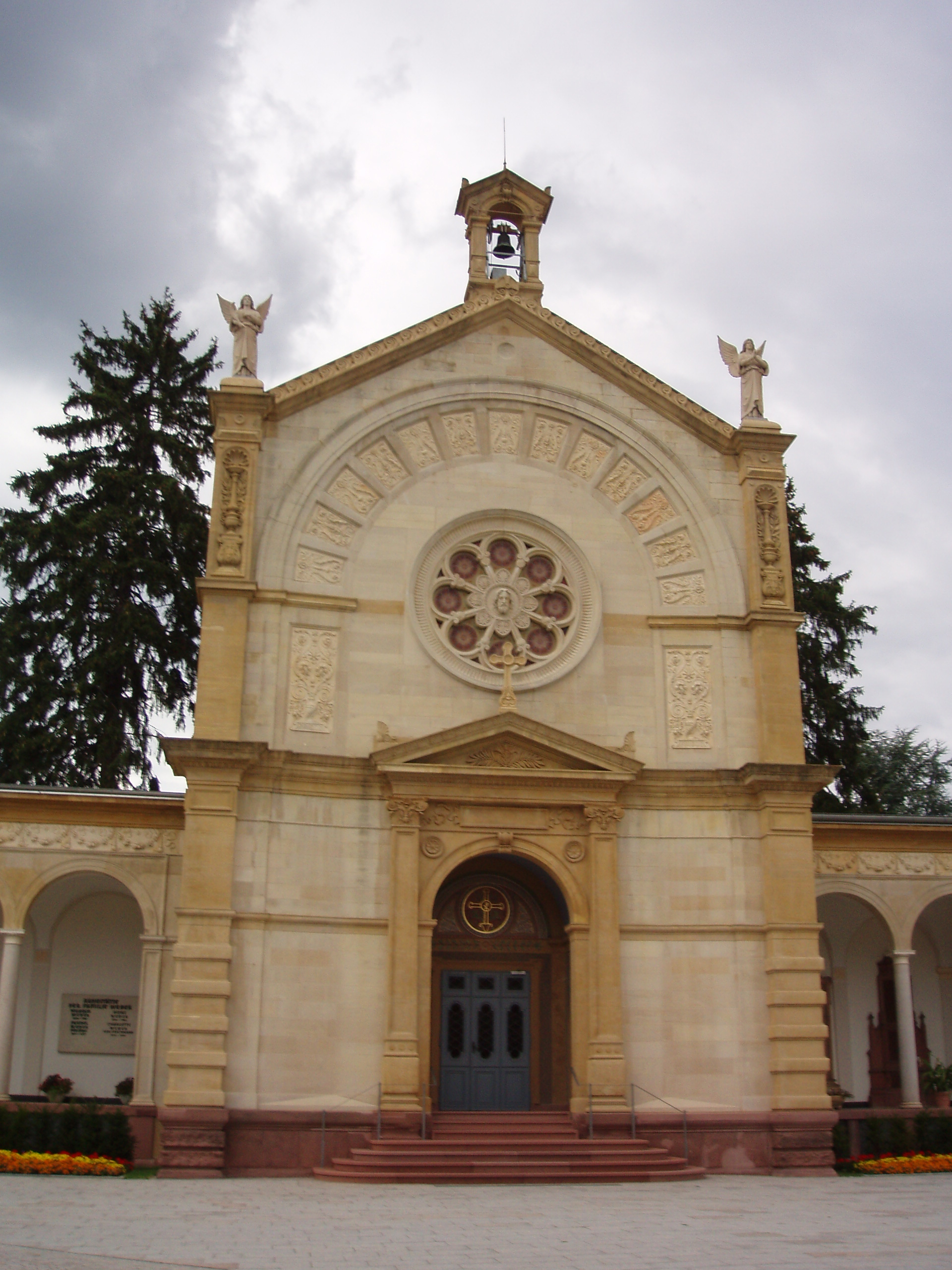
The chapel

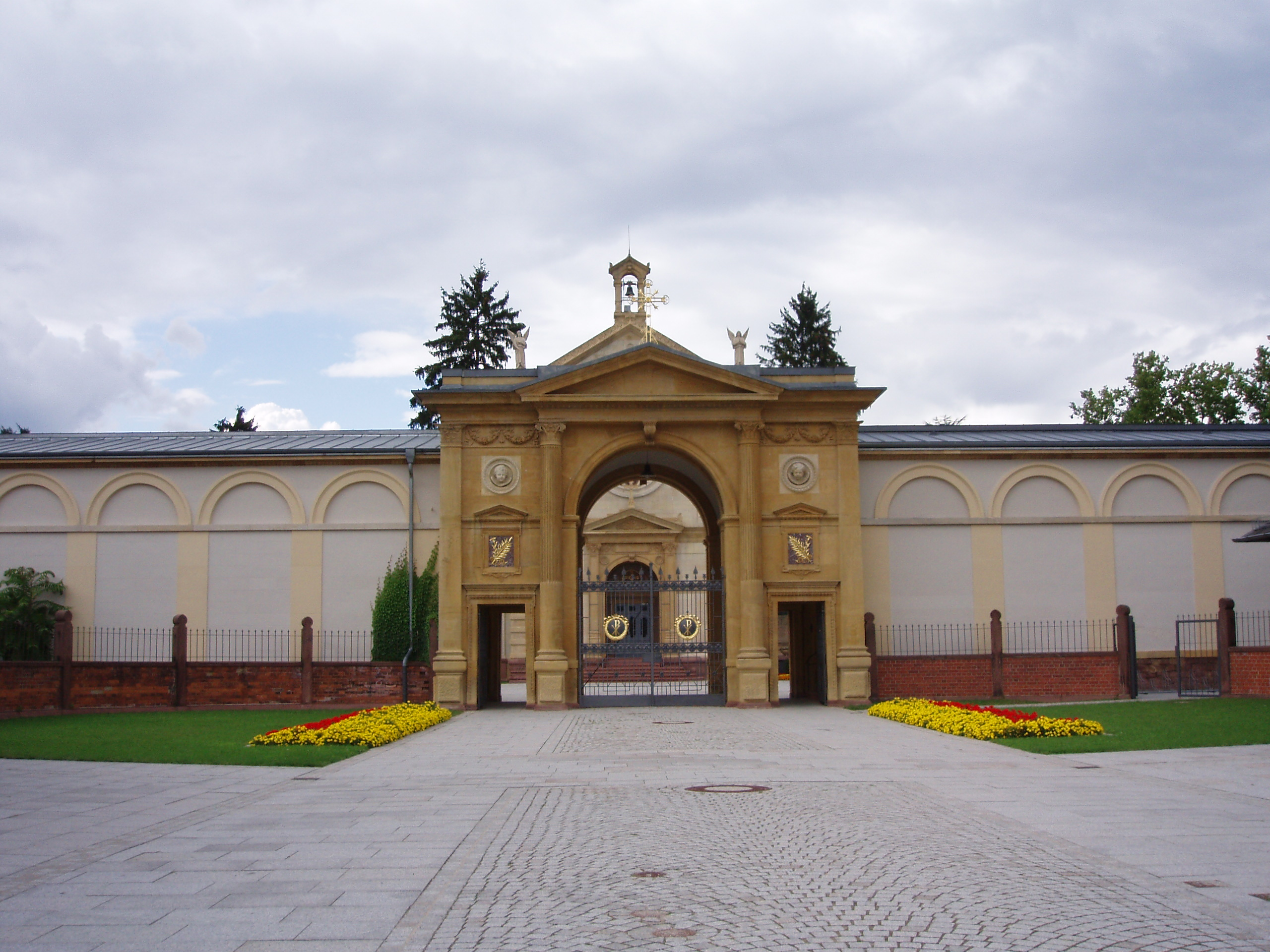
The entrance as a triumphal arch

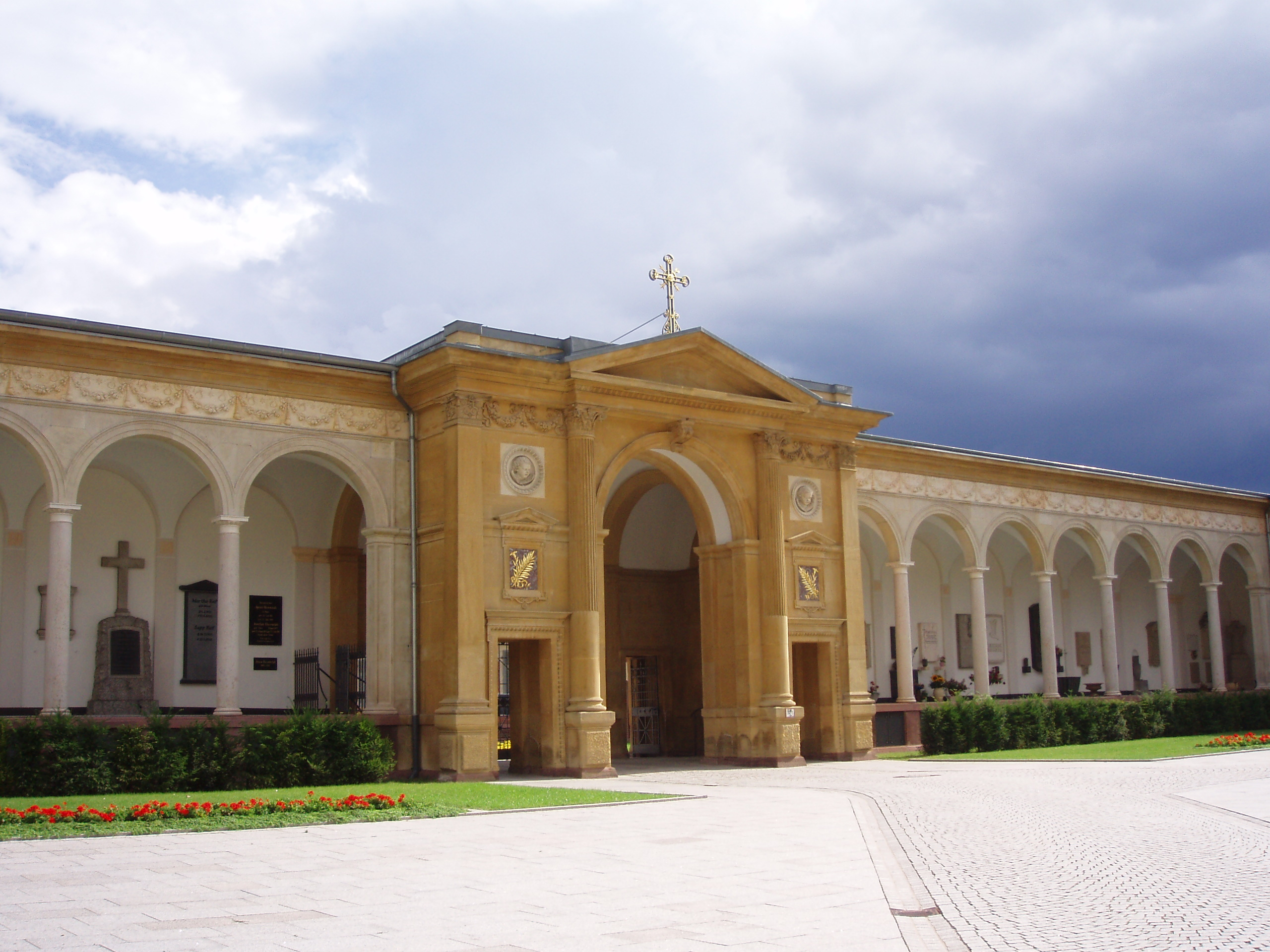
The Campo Santo with the inside of the triumphal arch

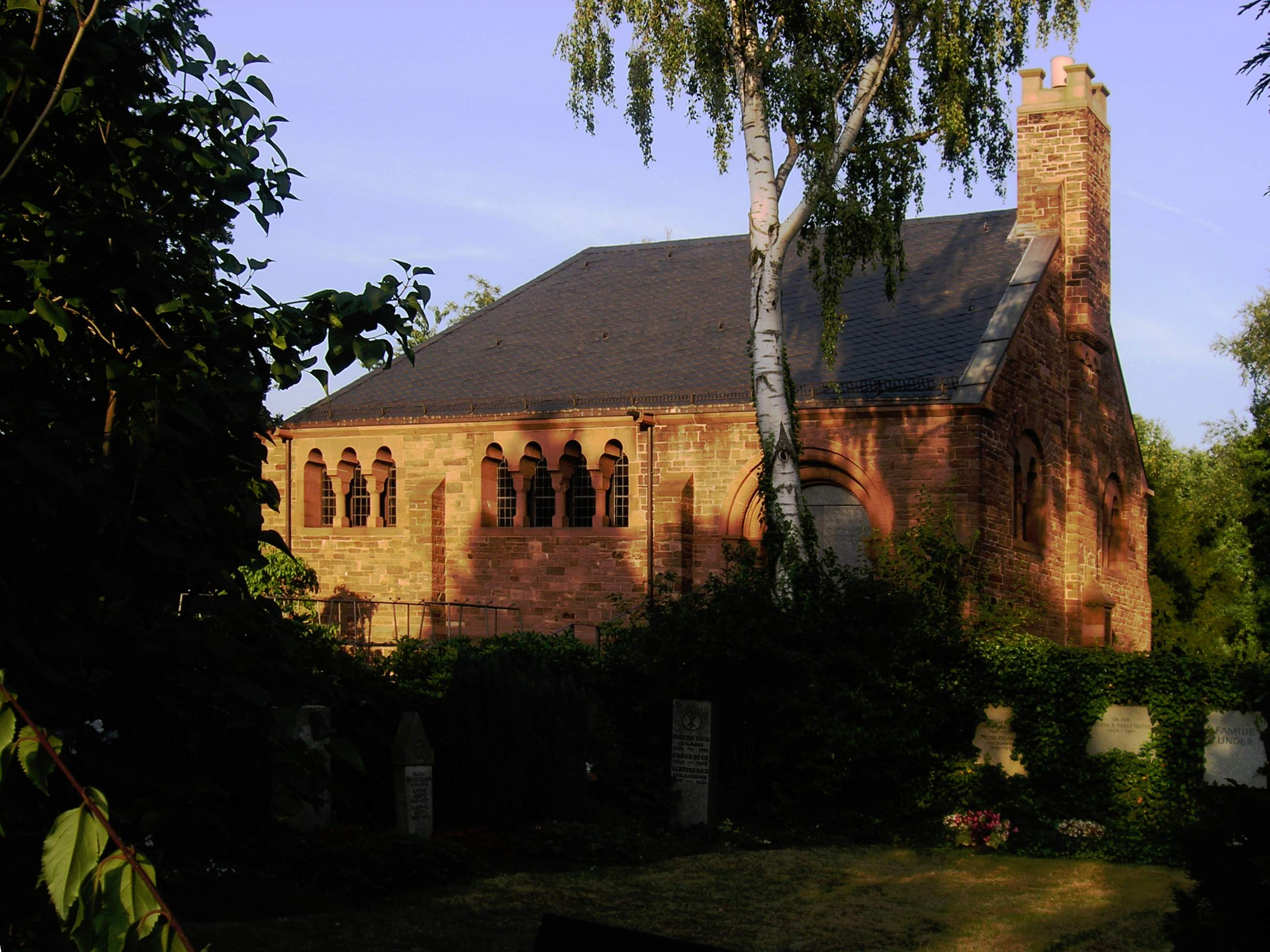
Karlsruhe Main Cemetery Small Chapel

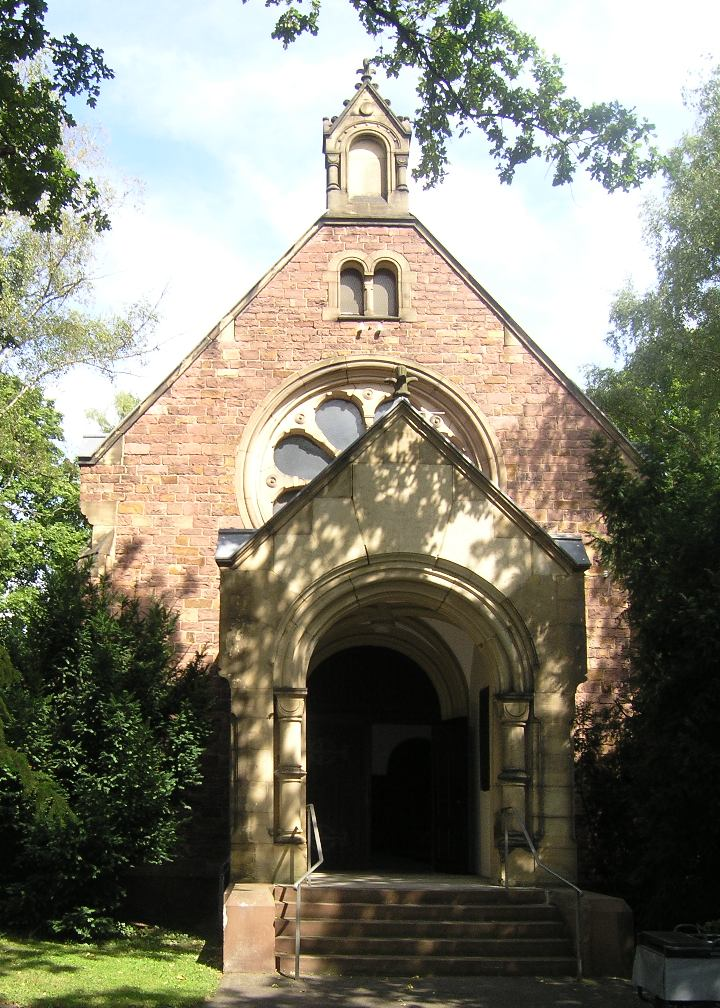
Jewish chapel in the general cemetery

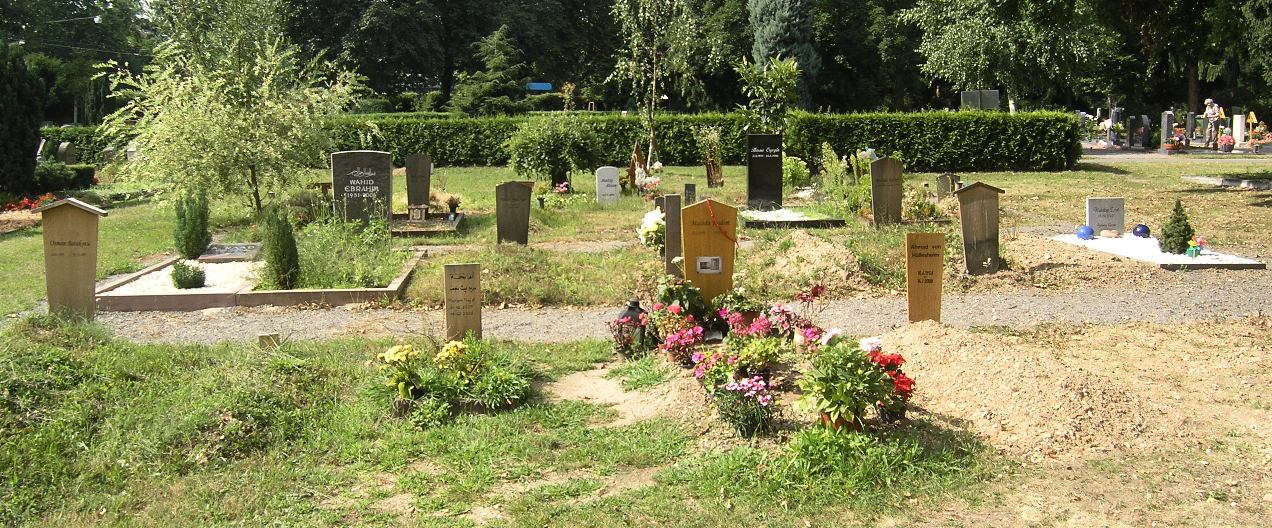
Muslim burial ground in the main cemetery

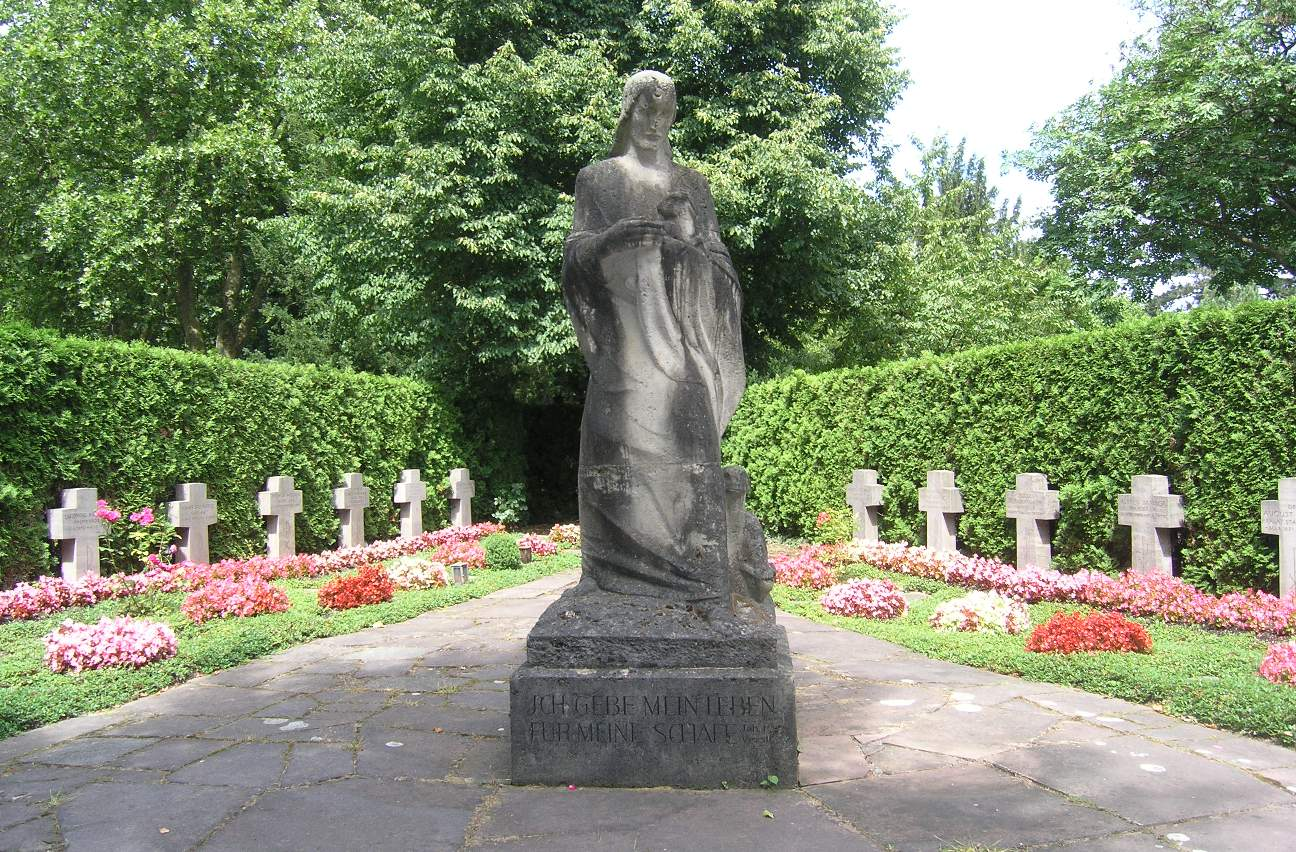
Sculpture on a burial ground

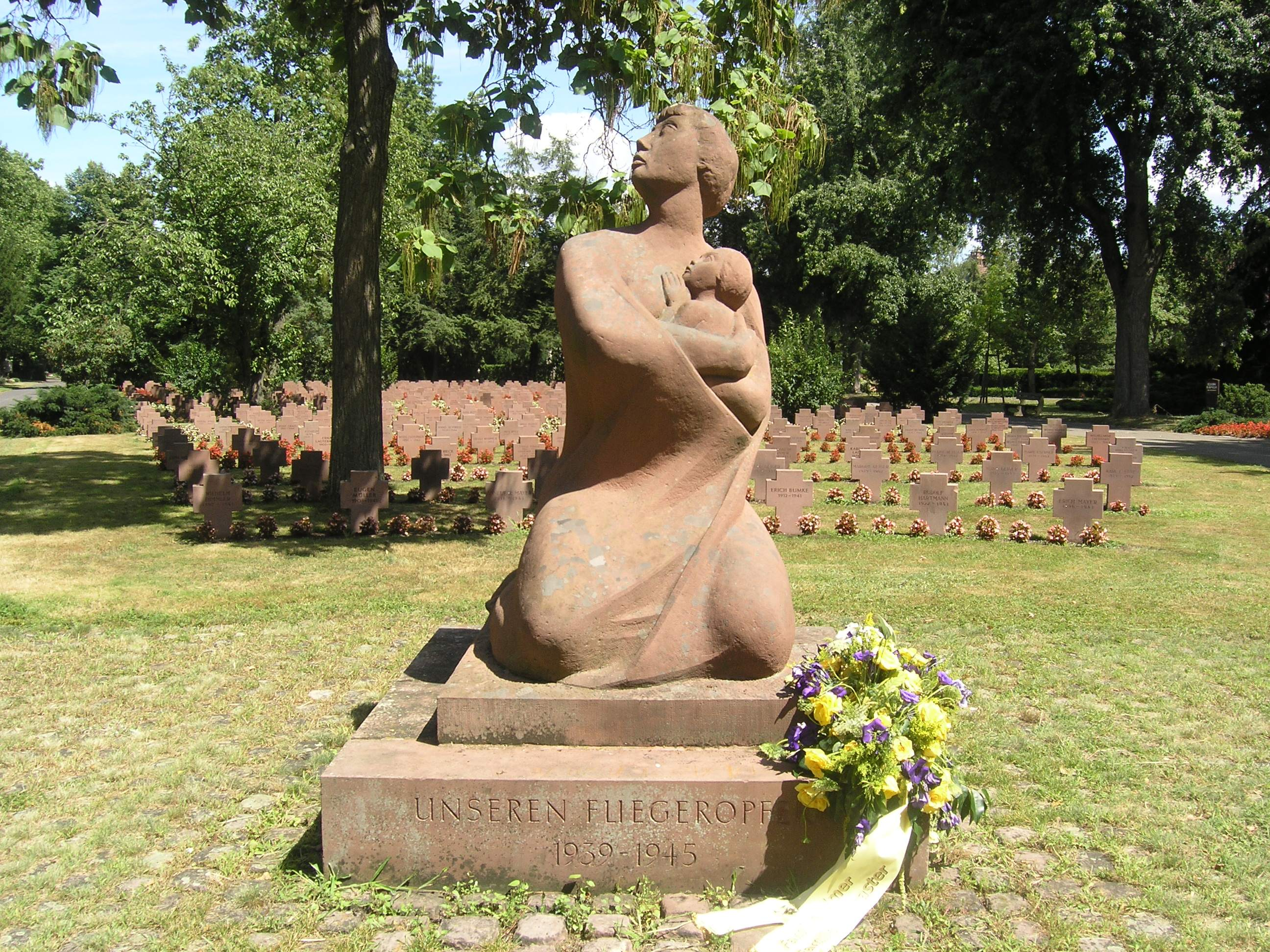
Memorial to air war victims in World War II

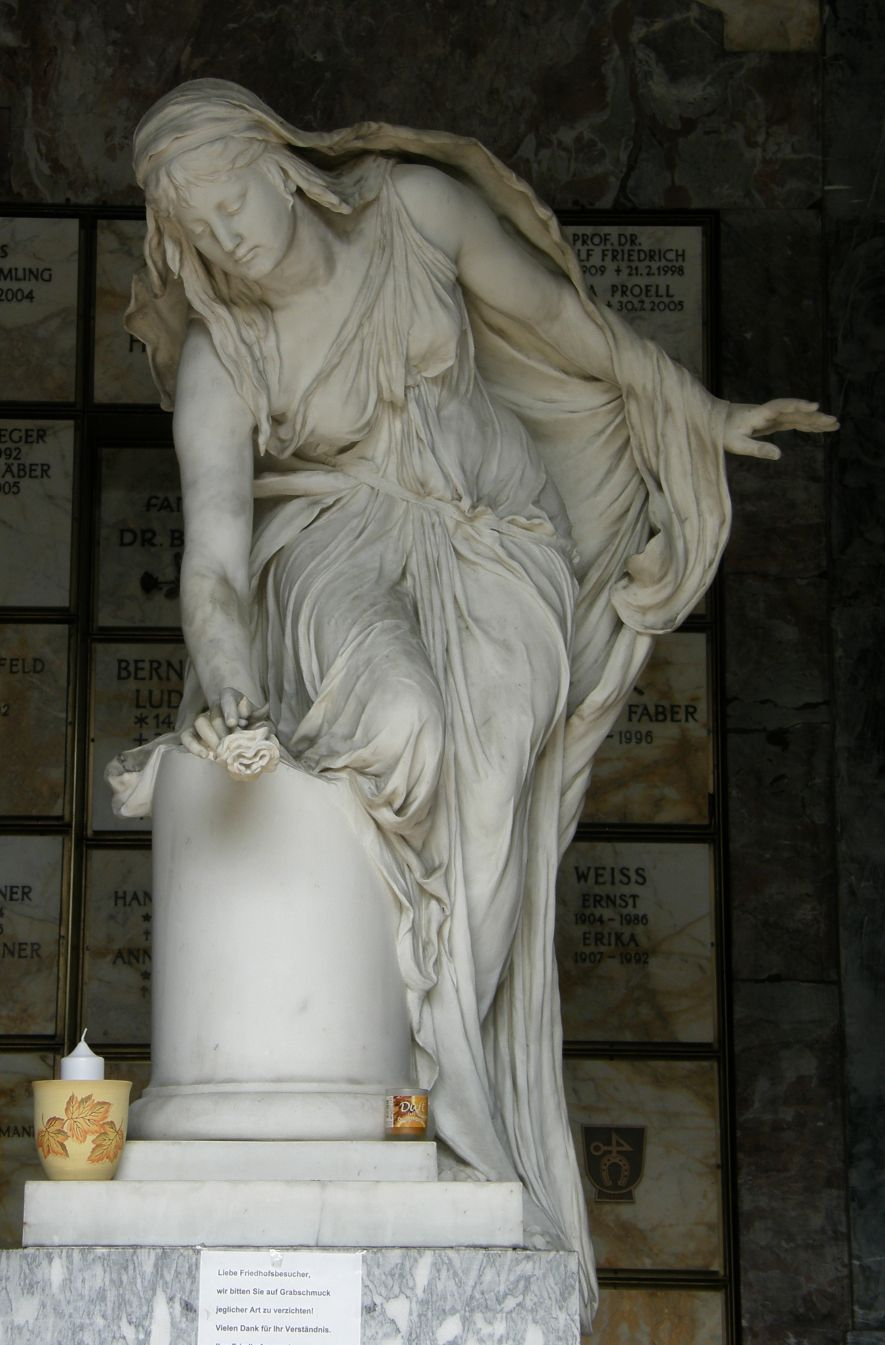
Sculpture in the Bürklin'sches Mausoleum created by Johannes Hoffart

The Hauptfriedhof in Karlsruhe is one of the oldest German communal rural cemeteries. In 1871, the first plans to build a new burial ground outside the city center began. The cemetery was laid out in 1874 by Josef Durm in the Rintheim district, east of the actual city, after the inner-city Alter Friedhof Karlsruhe in the Oststadt had become too small. The main cemetery has grown from its original size of 15.3 hectares in 1873 to over 34 hectares. The graves of more than 32,000 deceased are currently in the cemetery.

== Structuring ==
Curved avenues of plane trees instead of rigid axes were part of the new conception of the park cemetery. While the representative monuments stood on the main paths, the simpler tombs were hidden behind hedges. The former crematorium, today a chapel for burials on a small scale, is elevated.

Since 2003, natural burials have been offered in an area called Mein letzter Garten ("my last garden").

There is a Muslim burial ground in the cemetery. An Orthodox and a Liberal Jewish cemetery with the graves of Otto Nachmann and his son, the former chairman of the Central Council of Jews in Germany, Werner Nachmann are separated.

== Buildings ==
The entrance, which is reached from Haid-und-Neu-Straße after passing an avenue and several outbuildings, is designed in the style of a Roman triumphal arch. Behind the portal there is a courtyard based on the pattern of the Campo santo, which is closed off by the Renaissance-style crypt hall as well as the mortuary and the burial chapel. The ensemble is the first example of the Neo-Renaissance building in Baden and was restored at the beginning of the 21st century.

In 1903 the crematorium was built according to designs by August Stürzenacker. It is clad with reddish sandstone. With its neo-Romanesque design, it is considered the first crematorium to look like Christian sacred buildings; Until then, oriental architectural styles had been chosen for the type of burial, which the churches rejected. The building has been used as a small funeral hall since 2002. A new and more modern crematorium was put into operation in 1998.

The former resting place of the Bürklin family is also located in the cemetery. Today's Bürklin'sches Mausoleum was handed over to the city of Karlsruhe in 1963, which has been using it as a Columbarium since 1985.

== Information center ==
At the entrance to the cemetery area is the information center of the Verein zur Pflege der Friedhofs- und Bestattungskultur Karlsruhe. The information center was opened in April 2002 and is located in the former waiting hall of the former Karlsruhe local railway, which led to Hagsfeld. The building was designed by the Karlsruhe architect Friedrich Beichel and was built in Art Nouveau between 1905 and 1906. The association sees itself as a contact point for people who have ideas, questions and concerns about the topics of cemetery, burial and death. The association also offers cemetery tours, exhibitions and lectures.

== Famous persons ==
Over the years, a number of famous persons, some of whom were known far beyond the borders of Karlsruhe and the region, found their final resting place in the main cemetery in Karlsruhe. The best known among them is probably the inventor of the forerunner of the bicycle Karl Freiherr von Drais. Other prominent persons who were buried here included the poet and author Joseph Victor von Scheffel, the painter Hans Thoma and the composer and court music director Johann Wenzel Kalliwoda.

=== List of famous persons buried on the Hauptfriedhof Karlsruhe ===
==== A–D ====
- Engelbert Arnold (1856–1911), Engineer
- Klaus Arnold (1928–2009), Painter and university professor
- Hermann Baisch (1846–1894), Painter
- Hermann Baumeister (1867–1944), Painter
- Reinhard Baumeister (1833–1917), Engineer
- Traugott Bender (1927–1979), Politician
- Hermann Billing (1867–1946), Architect
- Adolf Boettge (1848–1913), music director and conductor of the 1st Baden Leib Grenadier Regiment No. 109
- Karl Braun (1902–1937), Motorcycle racer
- Hans Bunte (1848–1925), Chemist
- Luigi Colani (1928–2019), Designer
- Karl Delisle (1827–1909), Lawyer and politician
- Eduard Devrient (1801–1877), Actor, singer and theater director
- Ludwig Dill (1848–1940), Painter
- Edwin Dorner (1926–2012), Actor
- Karl Drais (1785–1851), The inventor of the balance bike (draisine)
- Arthur Drews (1865–1935), Philosopher and writer
- Josef Durm (1837–1919), Architect, construction officer and university professor
- Leopold Durm (1878–1918), Painter, doctor and son of Josef Durm

==== E–J ====
- Carl Egler (1896–1982), Sculptor
- Ludwig Egler (1894–1965), Composer and writer
- Willi Egler (1887–1953), Painter
- Friedrich Engesser (1848–1931), Engineer
- Carl Engler (1842–1925), Chemist
- Wilhelm Engler (1880–1958), Lawyer
- Rudolf Fettweis (1882–1956), Board of Directors of Badenwerk AG
- Kunigunde Fischer (1882–1967), Politician
- Hermann Föry (1879–1930), Sculptor
- Robert Gerwig (1820–1885), Railway engineer
- Franz Grashof (1826–1893), Mechanical engineer and university professor
- Franz Gurk (1898–1984), Lawyer and politician
- Josef Heinrich (1879–1955), Politician and Lord Mayor of Karlsruhe in 1945
- Johann Heinrich Jung-Stilling (1740–1817), Ophthalmologist, economist and writer
- Wilhelm Hempfing (1886–1948), Painter
- Julius Jolly (1823–1891), Baden politician, minister of state and head of government

==== K–Q ====
- Johann Wenzel Kalliwoda (1801–1866), Composer
- Herbert Kitzel (1928–1978), Artist
- Wilhelm Klose (1830–1914), Painter and patron
- Günther Klotz (1911–1972) from 1952 to 1970 mayor of Karlsruhe
- Heinrich Köhler (1878–1949), Politician
- Vinzenz Lachner (1811–1893), Composer and conductor
- Hanne Landgraf (1914–2005), Politician
- Heinrich Lang (1824–1893), Architect
- Wilhelm Florentin Lauter (1821–1892), Mayor of Karlsruhe from 1870 to 1892
- Otto Lehmann (1855–1922), Physicist
- Carl Friedrich Lessing (1808–1880), Painter and director of the Grand Ducal Picture Gallery in Karlsruhe
- Wilhelm Lorenz (1842–1926), Manufacturer and designer
- Wilhelm Lübke (1826–1893), Art historian
- Jakob Malsch (1809–1896), Mayor of Karlsruhe from 1848 to 1870
- Karl Mathy (1807–1868), Journalist and politician
- Heinrich Meidinger (1831–1905), Physicist
- Willi Müller-Hufschmid (1890–1966), Painter
- Theodor Nöldeke (1836–1930), Orientalist
- Wilhelm Nokk (1832–1903), Lawyer and politician
- Friedrich Ostendorf (1871–1915) Architect, architectural theorist and university professor

==== R–T ====
- Ferdinand Redtenbacher (1809–1863), Engineer and scientist
- Theodor Rehbock (1864–1950), Engineer
- Adam Remmele (1877–1951), Politician
- Toni Rothmund (1877–1956), Poet and journalist
- Carl Wilhelm Ernst Schäfer (1844–1908), Architect and university professor
- Josef Schmitt (1874–1939), President of Baden
- Karl Schnetzler (1846–1906), Mayor of Karlsruhe from 1892 to 1906
- Gustav Schönleber (1851–1917), Painter
- Robert Schwebler (1926–2012), Economist
- Harald Siebenmorgen (1949–2020), Director of the Baden State Museum
- Karl Siegrist (1862–1944), from 1906 to 1919 mayor of Karlsruhe
- Carl Steinhäuser (1813–1879), Sculptor
- Emil Sutor (1888–1974), Sculptor
- Ulli Thiel (1943–2014), Teacher and peace activist
- Hans Thoma (1839–1924), Painter and graphic artist
- Gabriele Thome (1951–2003), Professor of Philology
- Fritz Trautz (1917–2001), Historian
- Wilhelm Trübner (1851–1917), Painter and professor at the Karlsruhe Art Academy
- Ludwig Turban der Jüngere (1857–1930), board member of Baden

==== U–Z ====
- Hermann Veit (1897–1973), Lawyer and politician
- Hermann Volz (1847–1941), Sculptor
- Arthur von Brauer (1845–1926), Politician and lawyer
- Berthold von Freydorf (1820–1878), General
- Karl Wilhelm Eugen von Freydorf (1781–1854), Officer and Minister of War
- Rudolf von Freydorf (1819–1882), Politician
- Edgar von Gierke (1877–1945), Pathologist
- Egon von Neindorff (1923–2004), Riding master
- Joseph Victor von Scheffel (1826–1886), Poet
- Friedrich von Weech (1837–1905), Privy councilor and archivist
- Karl Weltzien (1813–1870), Chemiker
- Karl Wolf (1912–1975), Athlete
- Ernst Würtenberger (1868–1934), Painter
- Wolfgang Zeidler (1924–1987), Judge and President at the Federal Constitutional Court

=== Honor graves ===
On the site of the Hauptfriedhof there are also the Ehrengräber of the two lawyers working in Karlsruhe Ludwig Marum (1882–1934) and Reinhold Frank (1896–1945). Both men were victims of the Nazi regime and were each honored with their own memorial stone.

== See also ==
- Lists of cemeteries

== Pictures ==
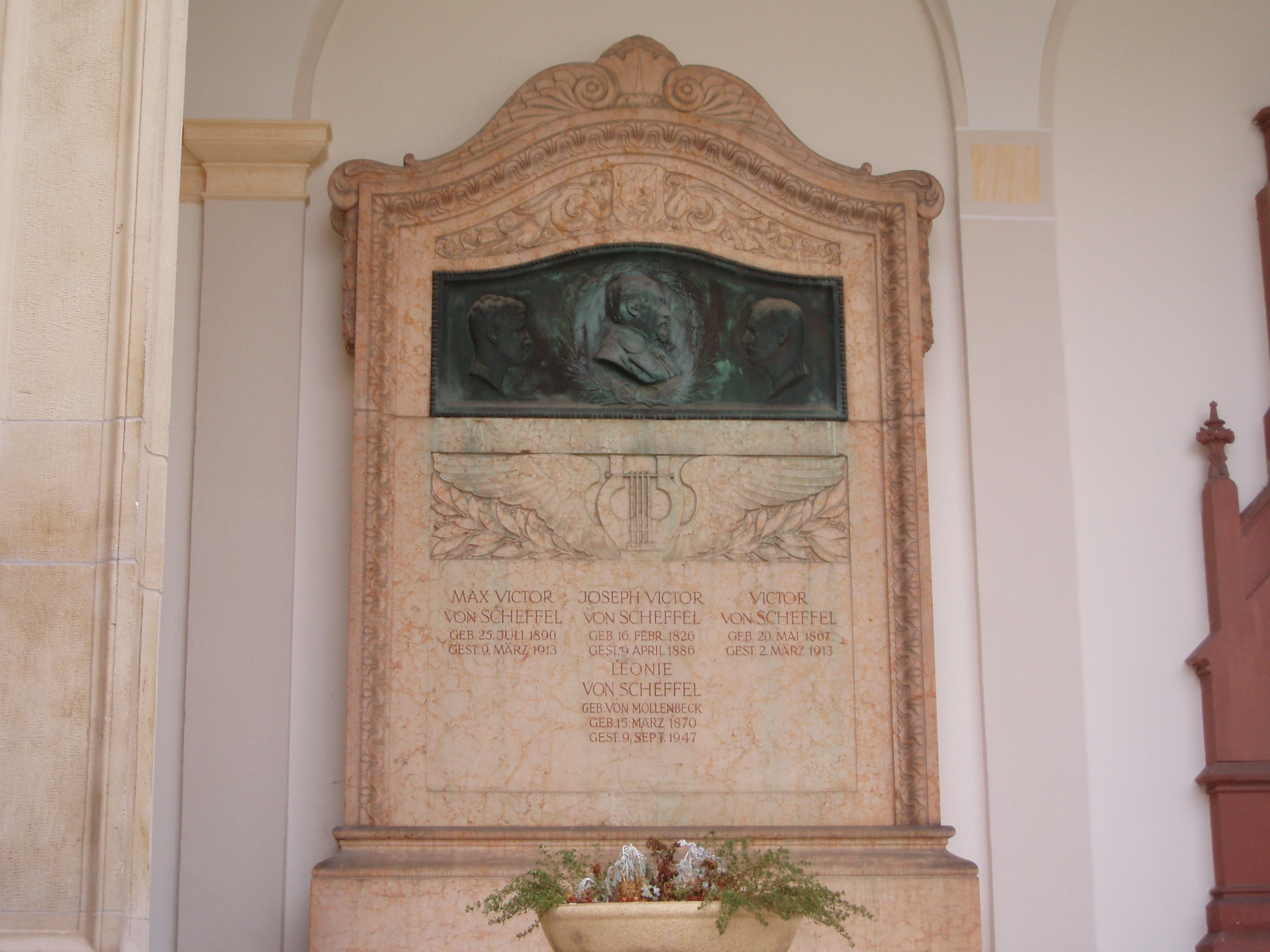
Memorial stone of the family Scheffel

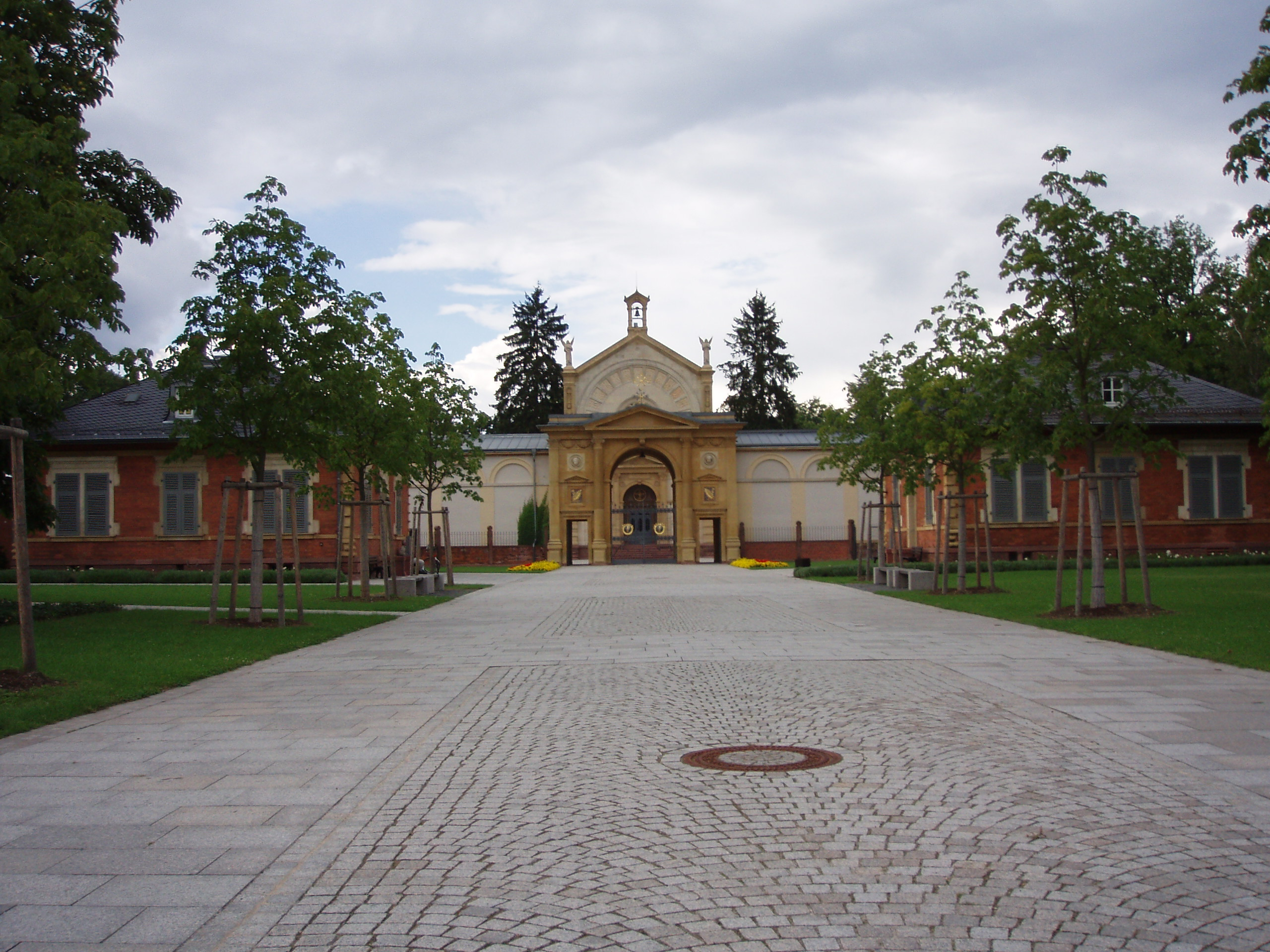
The main entrance seen from the roadside

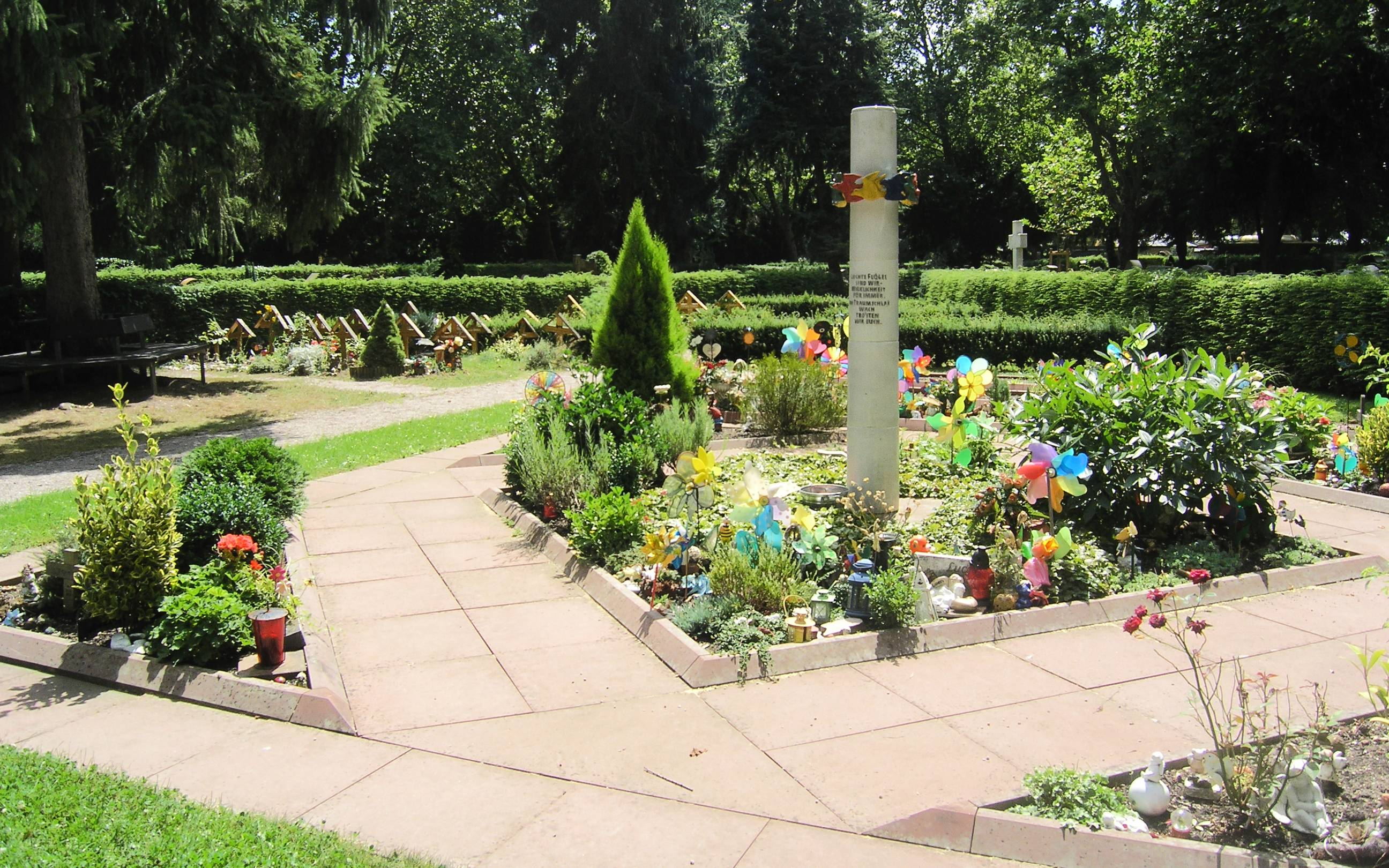
Infant grave

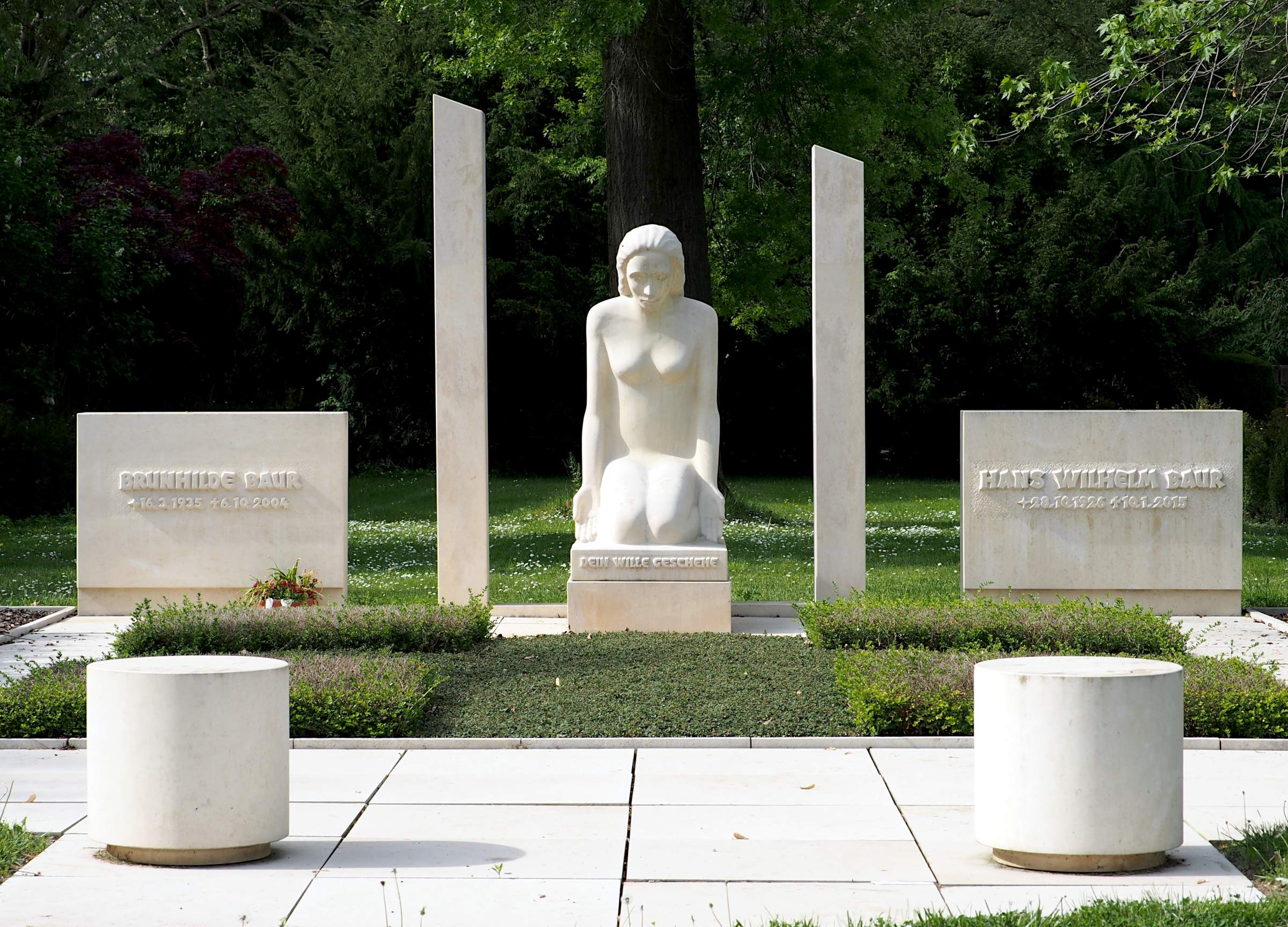
Grave of BNN publishers Brunhilde Baur and Hans Werner Baur

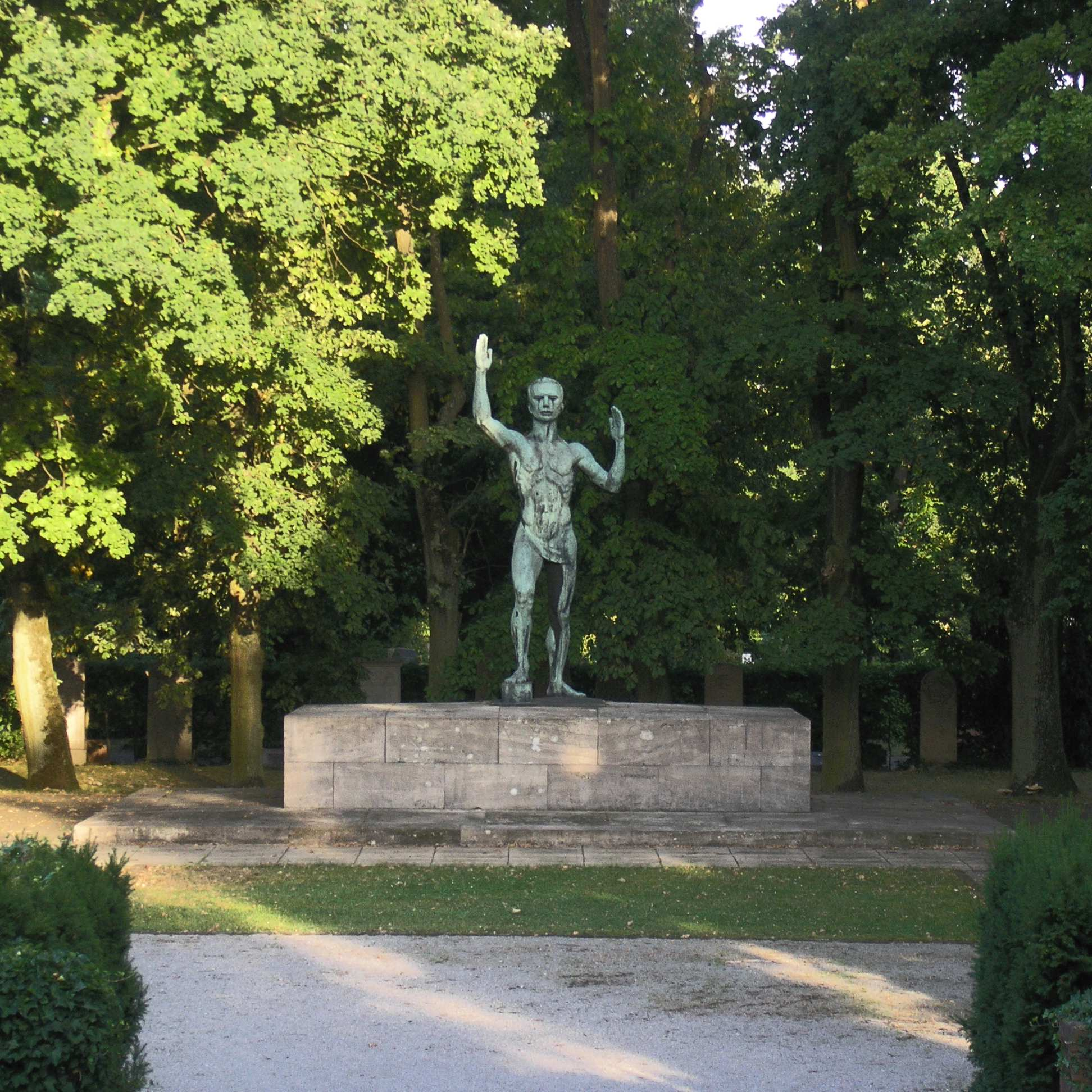
Memorial to those who fell in World War I.

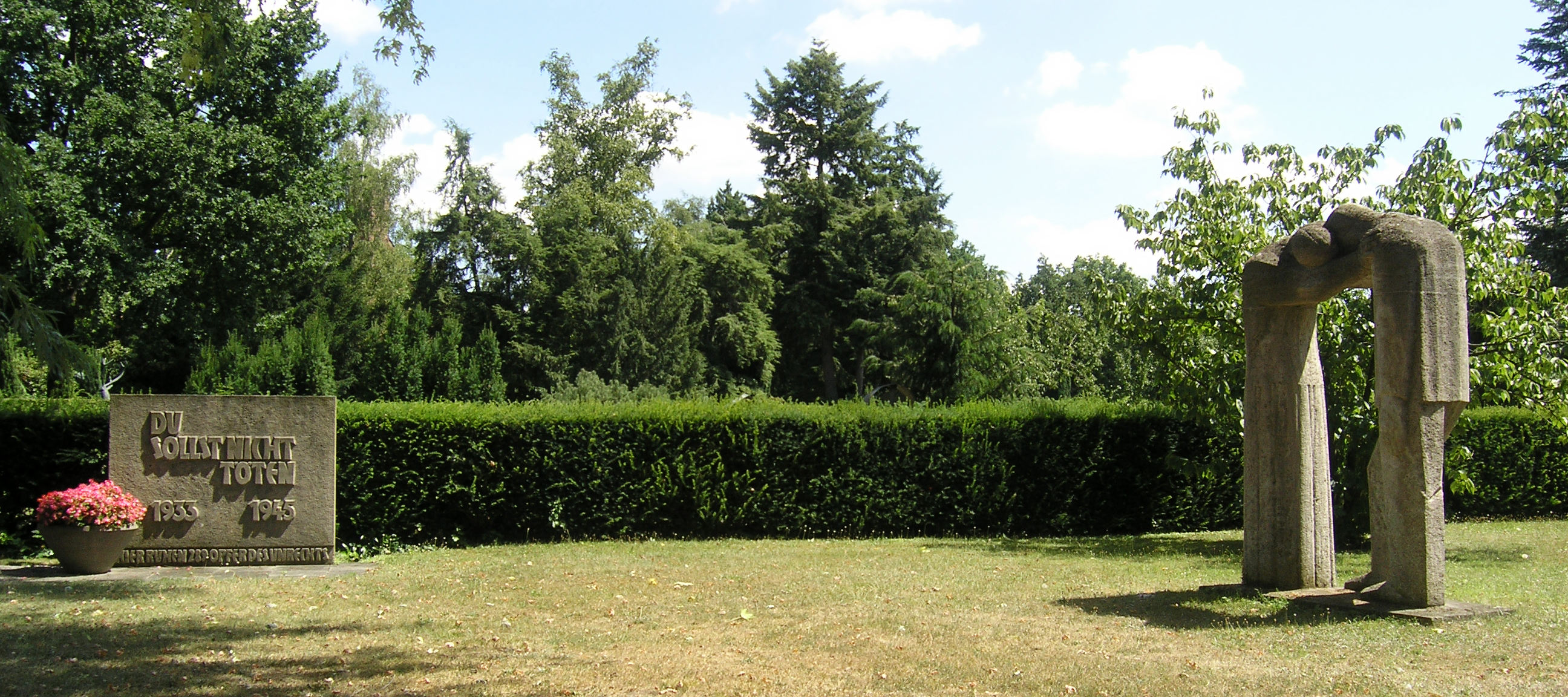
Memorial to the victims of the National Socialist "euthanasia"

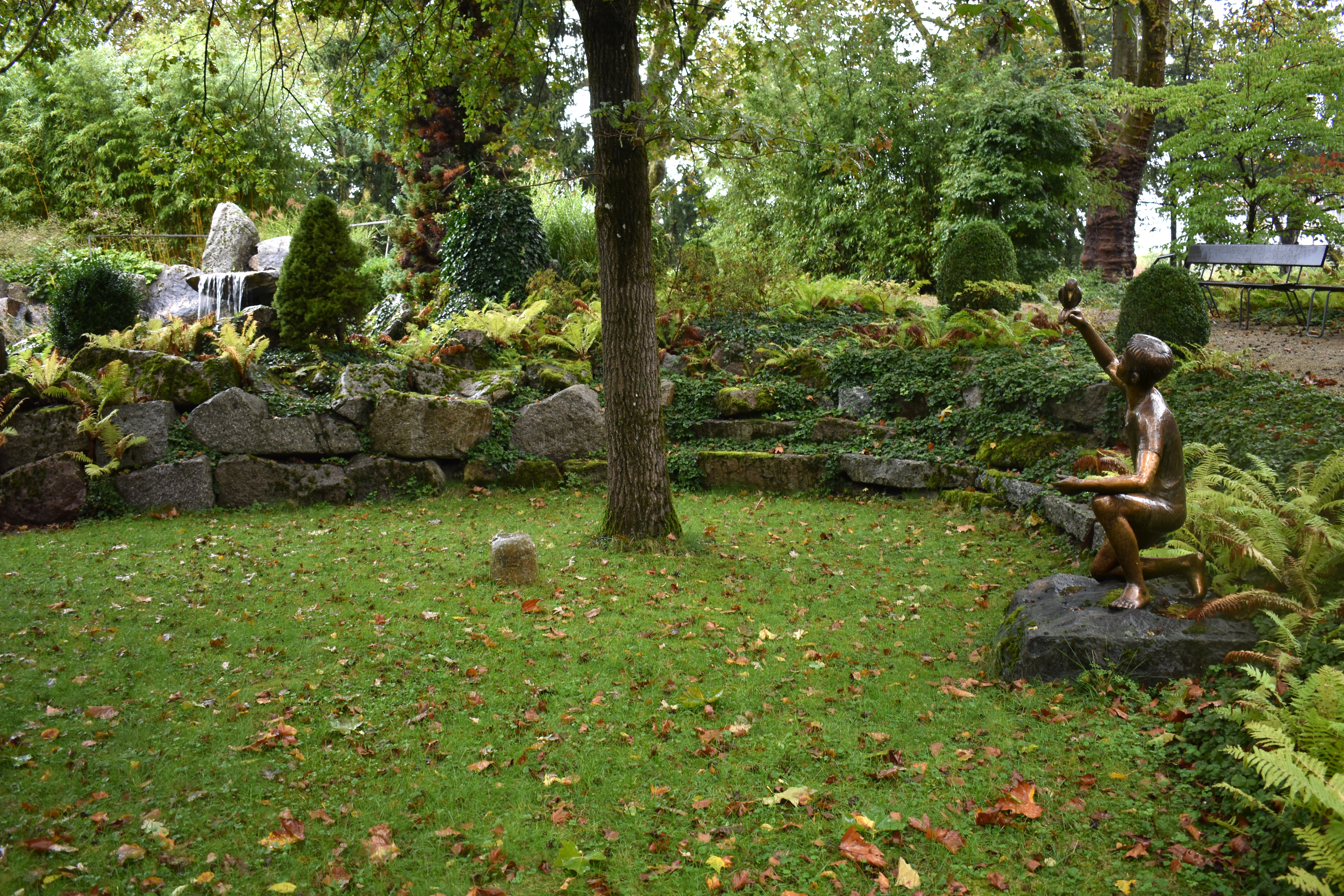
Mein letzter Garten [My Last Garden]

== Literature ==
- Karl Zahn: Gräber, Grüfte, Trauerstätten. Der Karlsruher Hauptfriedhof. Karlsruhe 2001, ISBN 3-88190-282-1
- Gerd Otto-Rieke: Gräber in Karlsruhe – Menschen, die uns bewegten. Geschichte entdecken auf Friedhöfen Band 4. München 2014, ISBN 978-3-938778-19-7
