= Toni Rothmund =

German writer and journalist

Toni Rothmund (2 October 1877, in Barlt, Schleswig-Holstein – 22 August 1956) was a German writer and journalist.

She wrote biographies, novels and tales.

== Work ==
=== Biographies ===
- Mesmer - Genie oder Scharlatan?

=== Tales ===
- Die Bernsteinperle

In English, The Amber Bead. This story was translated to English by Winifred Katzin, illustrated by Ernst Kutzer, and published (hardcover) in New York by Longmans, Green and Co. in 1930. Precis: Heide, a small child, is a foundling being raised by an old herbalist woman high on a mountainside. Heide can speak with all animals. Her conversations with the denizens of the mountain illustrate Man's inhumanity to man and the essential animality of Homo sapiens. Heide owns an amber bead, the history of which is slowly revealed. Through the bead, Heide is ultimately reunited her with her mother.

- Vom Allermärchenbaum

=== Poetry ===
- Einsamkeiten
- Der Baum, der vor Winter noch einmal blühte
