= Pseudosystenocentrus =

Scientific classification
- Domain: Eukaryota
- Kingdom: Animalia
- Phylum: Arthropoda
- Subphylum: Chelicerata
- Class: Arachnida
- Order: Opiliones
- Family: Sclerosomatidae
- Genus: Pseudosystenocentrus; Suzuki, 1985
- Species: P. foveolatus

Binomial name
- Pseudosystenocentrus foveolatus Suzuki, 1985

Genus of harvestmen/daddy longlegs

Pseudosystenocentrus foveolatus is a species of harvestmen in a monotypic genus in the family Sclerosomatidae.

Though the genus lacks distinct femoral nodules on all legs and technically belongs in the subfamily Leiobuninae but it has been provisionally assigned to that genus due to its strong resemblance to Gagrellinae.
