= B. celebensis =

B. celebensis may refer to:

- Babyrousa celebensis, the North Sulawesi babirusa, a pig-like animal
- Basilornis celebensis, the Sulawesi myna, a bird species
- Bonthainia celebensis, a species of harvestman (arachnid) belonging to the genus Bonthainia
