= Metazaleptus =

Scientific classification
- Domain: Eukaryota
- Kingdom: Animalia
- Phylum: Arthropoda
- Subphylum: Chelicerata
- Class: Arachnida
- Order: Opiliones
- Family: Sclerosomatidae
- Genus: Metazaleptus; Roewer, 1912

Genus of harvestmen/daddy longlegs

Metazaleptus is a genus of harvestmen in the family Sclerosomatidae from South and Southeast Asia.

== Species ==
- Metazaleptus adspersus (Roewer, 1955)
- Metazaleptus borneensis Banks, 1930
- Metazaleptus guttatus (Roewer, 1955)
- Metazaleptus hirsutus (With, 1903)
- Metazaleptus luteomaculatus (Suzuki, 1977)
- Metazaleptus montanus Banks, 1930
- Metazaleptus palpalis Banks, 1930
- Metazaleptus rufescens Banks, 1930
