= Psathyropus =

Scientific classification
- Domain: Eukaryota
- Kingdom: Animalia
- Phylum: Arthropoda
- Subphylum: Chelicerata
- Class: Arachnida
- Order: Opiliones
- Family: Sclerosomatidae
- Genus: Psathyropus; L. Koch, 1878

Genus of harvestmen/daddy longlegs

Psathyropus is a genus of harvestmen in the family Sclerosomatidae from Asia.

== Species ==
- Psathyropus aurolucens (Roewer, 1954)
- Psathyropus bengalensis (Roewer, 1954)
- Psathyropus bilineata (Roewer, 1954)
- Psathyropus bimaculata (Roewer, 1954)
- Psathyropus biseriata (Roewer, 1912)
- Psathyropus cingulata (Roewer, 1954)
- Psathyropus conspicua (Roewer, 1954)
- Psathyropus cuprilucida (Roewer, 1954)
- Psathyropus conjugata (Roewer, 1954)
- Psathyropus damila Silhavý, 1976
- Psathyropus distincta (Sato & Suzuki, 1938)
- Psathyropus formosa (Roewer, 1911)
- Psathyropus granulata (Roewer, 1954)
- Psathyropus granulosa Suzuki, 1977
- Psathyropus guttata (Roewer, 1954)
- Psathyropus hainanensis (Wang, 1941)
- Psathyropus hsuehshanensis Suzuki, 1977
- Psathyropus hirta (Roewer, 1915)
- Psathyropus koyamai (S. Suzuki, 1979)
- Psathyropus luteomaculata (S. Suzuki, 1970)
- Psathyropus mandalayia (Roewer, 1954)
- Psathyropus minax (Thorell, 1889)
- Psathyropus mysoreana (Roewer, 1954)
- Psathyropus nigra (Roewer, 1912)
- Psathyropus octomaculata (Roewer, 1954)
- Psathyropus perakana (Roewer, 1954)
- Psathyropus pustulata (Roewer, 1910)
- Psathyropus roeweri (Suzuki, 1974)
- Psathyropus rufa (Roewer, 1954)
- Psathyropus rufoscuta (S. Suzuki, 1982)
- Psathyropus satarensis (Roewer, 1954)
- Psathyropus silvestri (Roewer, 1927)
- Psathyropus sinensis (Schenkel, 1953)
- Psathyropus sordidata (Thorell, 1889)
- Psathyropus sulcata (Roewer, 1954)
- Psathyropus tenuipes L. Koch, 1878
- Psathyropus tenuis (Roewer, 1954)
- Psathyropus tongkingensis (Roewer, 1954)
- Psathyropus usuriensis (Redikorzev, 1936)
- Psathyropus versicolor (Suzuki, 1964)
