= Pygobunus =

Scientific classification
- Kingdom: Animalia
- Phylum: Arthropoda
- Subphylum: Chelicerata
- Class: Arachnida
- Order: Opiliones
- Family: Sclerosomatidae
- Subfamily: Sclerosomatinae
- Genus: Pygobunus; Roewer, 1957

Genus of harvestmen

Pygobunus is a genus of harvestmen in the family Sclerosomatidae. There are at least two described species in Pygobunus.

== Species ==
These two species belong to the genus Pygobunus:

- Pygobunus formosanus Roewer, 1957 (Taiwan, China)
- Pygobunus okadai Tsurusaki, 1983 (Japan)
