= Koyamaia =

Scientific classification
- Kingdom: Animalia
- Phylum: Arthropoda
- Subphylum: Chelicerata
- Class: Arachnida
- Order: Opiliones
- Family: Sclerosomatidae
- Subfamily: Gagrellinae
- Genus: Koyamaia; Suzuki, 1972
- Species: K. curvipes

Binomial name
- Koyamaia curvipes Suzuki, 1972

Genus of harvestmen

Koyamaia curvipes is a species of harvestmen in a monotypic genus in the family Sclerosomatidae.
