= Hamitergum =

Scientific classification
- Domain: Eukaryota
- Kingdom: Animalia
- Phylum: Arthropoda
- Subphylum: Chelicerata
- Class: Arachnida
- Order: Opiliones
- Family: Sclerosomatidae
- Genus: Hamitergum; Crawford, 1992
- Species: H. eobius

Binomial name
- Hamitergum eobius (Redikorzev, 1936)

Genus of harvestmen/daddy longlegs

Hamitergum eobius is a species of harvestmen in a monotypic genus in the family Sclerosomatidae from Russia.
