= Syngagrella =

Scientific classification
- Domain: Eukaryota
- Kingdom: Animalia
- Phylum: Arthropoda
- Subphylum: Chelicerata
- Class: Arachnida
- Order: Opiliones
- Family: Sclerosomatidae
- Genus: Syngagrella; Roewer, 1913
- Species: S. bistriata

Binomial name
- Syngagrella bistriata Roewer, 1913

Genus of harvestmen/daddy longlegs

Syngagrella bistriata is a species of harvestmen in a monotypic genus in the family Sclerosomatidae from Celebes.
