= Psammogeaya =

Psammogeaya arenata

Scientific classification
- Domain: Eukaryota
- Kingdom: Animalia
- Phylum: Arthropoda
- Subphylum: Chelicerata
- Class: Arachnida
- Order: Opiliones
- Family: Sclerosomatidae
- Genus: Psammogeaya; Mello-Leitão, 1946
- Species: P. arenata

Binomial name
- Psammogeaya arenata Mello-Leitão, 1946

Genus of harvestmen/daddy longlegs

Psammogeaya arenata is a species of harvestmen in a monotypic genus in the family Sclerosomatidae from Uruguay.
