= Biceropsis =

Scientific classification
- Domain: Eukaryota
- Kingdom: Animalia
- Phylum: Arthropoda
- Subphylum: Chelicerata
- Class: Arachnida
- Order: Opiliones
- Family: Sclerosomatidae
- Genus: Biceropsis; Roewer, 1935
- Species: B. maculata

Binomial name
- Biceropsis maculata Roewer, 1935

Genus of harvestmen/daddy longlegs

Biceropsis maculata is a species of harvestmen in a monotypic genus in the family Sclerosomatidae from Burma.
