= Gagrellopsis =

Scientific classification
- Domain: Eukaryota
- Kingdom: Animalia
- Phylum: Arthropoda
- Subphylum: Chelicerata
- Class: Arachnida
- Order: Opiliones
- Family: Sclerosomatidae
- Subfamily: Gagrellinae
- Genus: Gagrellopsis; Sato & Suzuki, 1939
- Species: G. nodulifera

Binomial name
- Gagrellopsis nodulifera Sato & Suzuki, 1939

Genus of harvestmen/daddy longlegs

Gagrellopsis nodulifera is a species of harvestmen in a monotypic genus in the family Sclerosomatidae from Japan.
