= Amazonesia =

Scientific classification
- Domain: Eukaryota
- Kingdom: Animalia
- Phylum: Arthropoda
- Subphylum: Chelicerata
- Class: Arachnida
- Order: Opiliones
- Family: Sclerosomatidae
- Genus: Amazonesia; Soares, 1970

Genus of harvestmen/daddy longlegs

Amazonesia is a genus of harvestmen in the family Sclerosomatidae.

== Species ==
- Amazonesia quadriprocessigera H.E.M.Soares, 1970
- Amazonesia pulchra H.E.M.Soares, 1970
