= Antigrella =

Scientific classification
- Domain: Eukaryota
- Kingdom: Animalia
- Phylum: Arthropoda
- Subphylum: Chelicerata
- Class: Arachnida
- Order: Opiliones
- Family: Sclerosomatidae
- Genus: Antigrella; Roewer, 1954
- Species: A. orissana

Binomial name
- Antigrella orissana Roewer, 1954

Genus of harvestmen/daddy longlegs

Antigrella orissana is a species of harvestmen in a monotypic genus in the family Sclerosomatidae.
