= Pergagrella =

Scientific classification
- Domain: Eukaryota
- Kingdom: Animalia
- Phylum: Arthropoda
- Subphylum: Chelicerata
- Class: Arachnida
- Order: Opiliones
- Family: Sclerosomatidae
- Genus: Pergagrella; Roewer, 1954
- Species: P. monticola

Binomial name
- Pergagrella monticola Roewer, 1954

Genus of harvestmen/daddy longlegs

Pergagrella monticola is a species of harvestmen in a monotypic genus in the family Sclerosomatidae.
