= Nepalkanchia =

Scientific classification
- Domain: Eukaryota
- Kingdom: Animalia
- Phylum: Arthropoda
- Subphylum: Chelicerata
- Class: Arachnida
- Order: Opiliones
- Family: Sclerosomatidae
- Genus: Nepalkanchia; Martens, 1990

Genus of harvestmen/daddy longlegs

Nepalkanchia is a genus of harvestmen in the family Sclerosomatidae from Nepal.

== Species ==
- Nepalkanchia pluviosilvestris (J. Martens, 1987)
- Nepalkanchia silvicola (J. Martens, 1987)
