= Holmbergiana =

Scientific classification
- Domain: Eukaryota
- Kingdom: Animalia
- Phylum: Arthropoda
- Subphylum: Chelicerata
- Class: Arachnida
- Order: Opiliones
- Family: Sclerosomatidae
- Genus: Holmbergiana; Mello-Leitão, 1931

Genus of harvestmen/daddy longlegs

Holmbergiana is a genus of harvestmen in the family Sclerosomatidae from South America.

== Species ==
- Holmbergiana orientalis Ringuelet, 1963
- Holmbergiana tibialis Ringuelet, 1960
- Holmbergiana weyenberghii (Holmberg, 1876)
