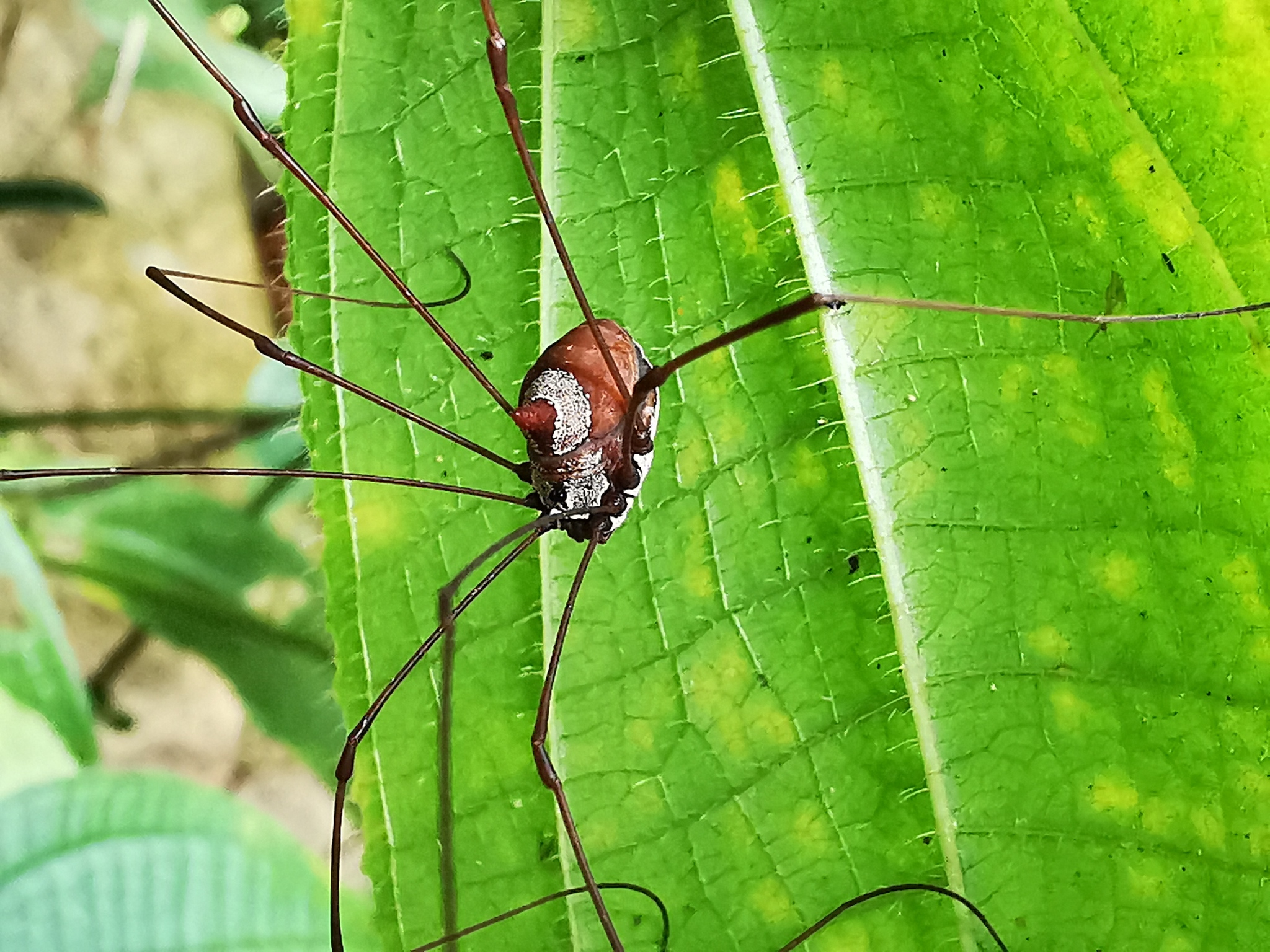
- Marthana niveata

Scientific classification
- Domain: Eukaryota
- Kingdom: Animalia
- Phylum: Arthropoda
- Subphylum: Chelicerata
- Class: Arachnida
- Order: Opiliones
- Family: Sclerosomatidae
- Genus: Marthana; Thorell, 1891

= Marthana =

Genus of harvestmen/daddy longlegs

Marthana is a genus of harvestmen in the family Sclerosomatidae found in Southeast Asia.

== Species ==
- Marthana affinis Banks, 1930
- Marthana aurata (Roewer, 1955)
- Marthana bakeri Roewer, 1955
- Marthana balabacana Suzuki, 1977
- Marthana beharensis (Roewer, 1955)
- Marthana birmanica (Roewer, 1955)
- Marthana cerata (Roewer, 1912)
- Marthana columnaris Thorell, 1891
- Marthana columnaris Roewer, 1955
- Marthana cornifer Loman, 1906
- Marthana cuspidata Loman, in Weber 1892
- Marthana ferruginea (Roewer, 1911)
- Marthana furcata Banks, 1930
- Marthana fusca (Roewer, 1912)
- Marthana idjena (Roewer, 1955)
- Marthana moluccana (Roewer, 1955)
- Marthana negrosensis (Roewer, 1955)
- Marthana nigerrima (Müller, 1916)
- Marthana niveata (Roewer, 1955)
- Marthana perspicillata (Roewer, 1911)
- Marthana sarasinorum Roewer, 1913
- Marthana scripta (Roewer, 1955)
- Marthana siamensis (Roewer, 1955)
- Marthana turrita Thorell, 1891
- Marthana turrita (Roewer, 1910)
- Marthana vestita With, 1905
