= Euceratobunus =

Scientific classification
- Domain: Eukaryota
- Kingdom: Animalia
- Phylum: Arthropoda
- Subphylum: Chelicerata
- Class: Arachnida
- Order: Opiliones
- Family: Sclerosomatidae
- Genus: Euceratobunus; Roewer, 1923
- Species: E. pulcher

Binomial name
- Euceratobunus pulcher (With, 1903)

Genus of harvestmen/daddy longlegs

Euceratobunus pulcher is a species of harvestmen in a monotypic genus in the family Sclerosomatidae from India.
