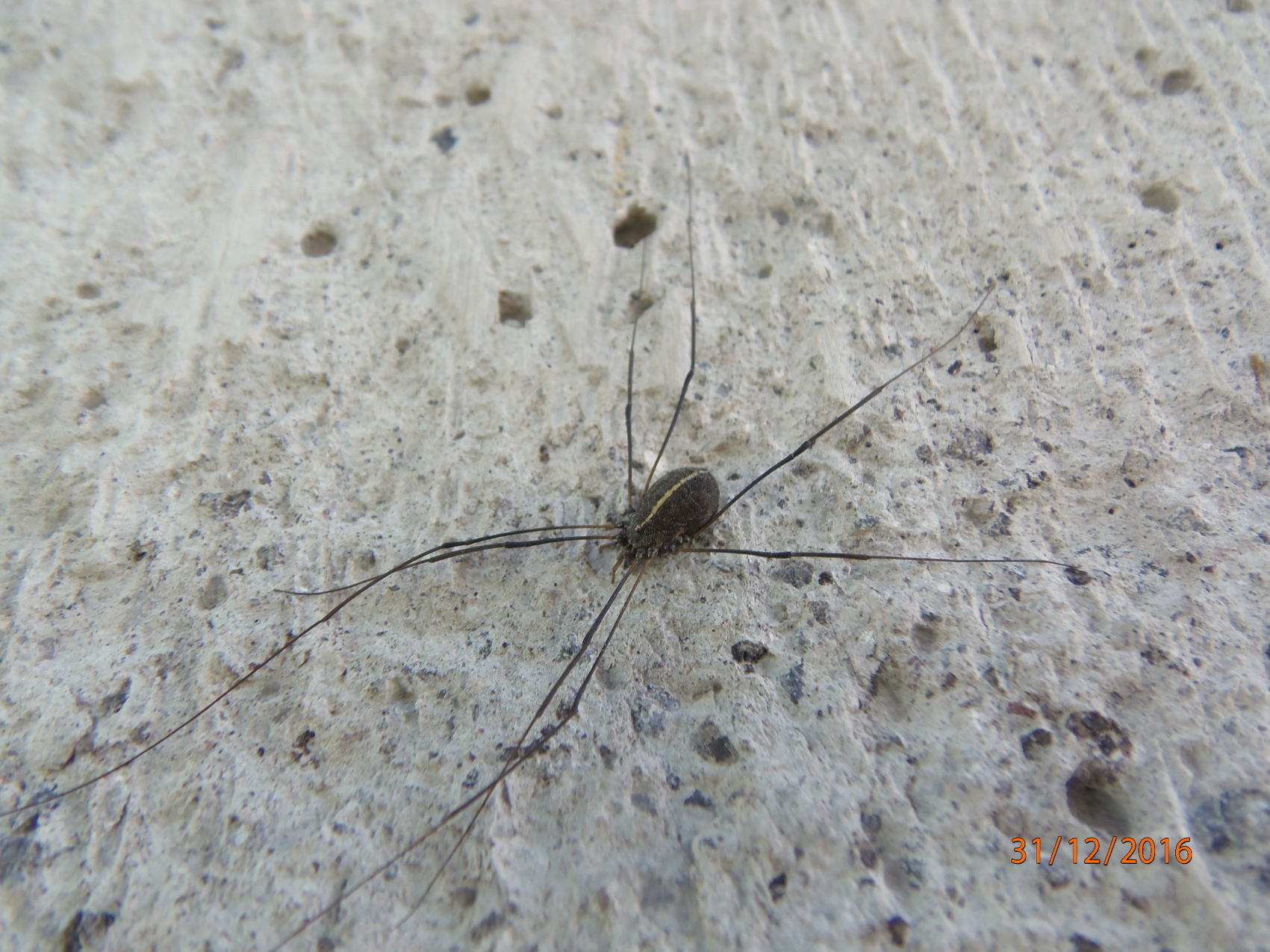
- Paranelima albalineata, México

Scientific classification
- Domain: Eukaryota
- Kingdom: Animalia
- Phylum: Arthropoda
- Subphylum: Chelicerata
- Class: Arachnida
- Order: Opiliones
- Family: Sclerosomatidae
- Subfamily: Leiobuninae
- Genus: Paranelima; Caporiacco, 1938

Synonyms
- Glabrurus Goodnight & Goodnight, 1942

= Paranelima =

Genus of harvestmen

Paranelima is a genus of harvestmen in the family Sclerosomatidae. There are about six described species in Paranelima, found in Mexico and Central America.

== Species ==
These six species belong to the genus Paranelima:

- Paranelima albalineata Goodnight & Goodnight, 1942
- Paranelima cerrana Goodnight & Goodnight, 1942
- Paranelima correa Goodnight & Goodnight, 1945
- Paranelima lutzi (Goodnight & Goodnight, 1942)
- Paranelima mexicana (Goodnight & Goodnight, 1942)
- Paranelima taibeli Caporiacco, 1938
