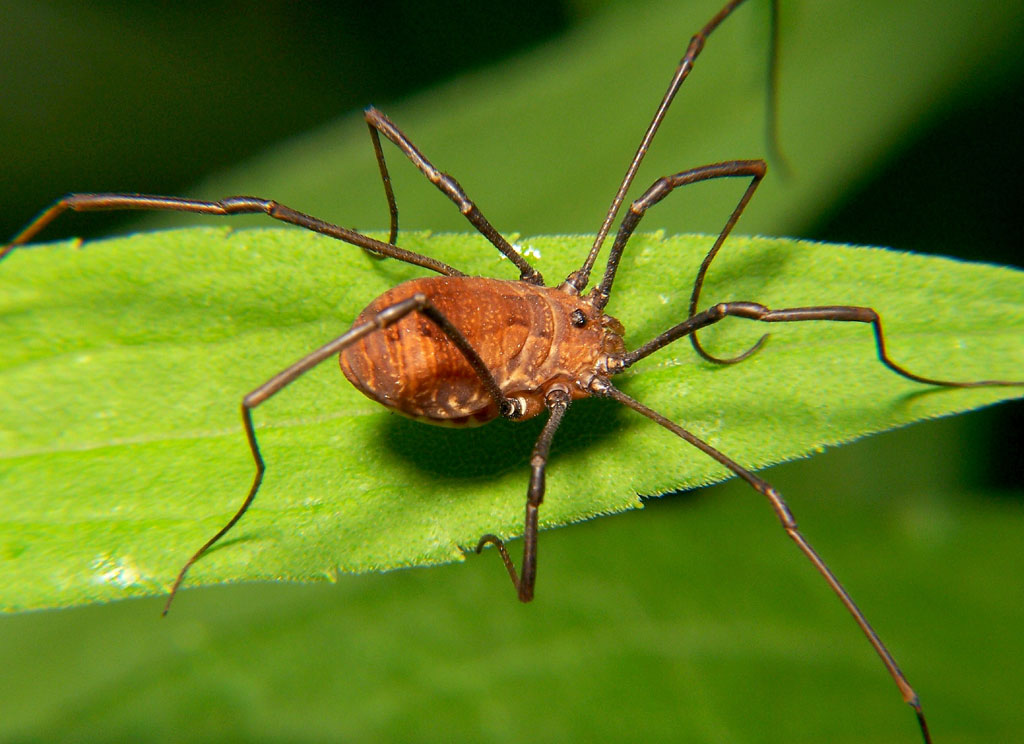
- Hadrobunus grandis

Scientific classification
- Domain: Eukaryota
- Kingdom: Animalia
- Phylum: Arthropoda
- Subphylum: Chelicerata
- Class: Arachnida
- Order: Opiliones
- Suborder: Eupnoi
- Superfamily: Phalangioidea
- Family: Sclerosomatidae; Simon, 1879

Subfamilies
- Gagrellinae (117 genera); Gyantinae (3 genera); Leiobuninae (13 genera); Sclerosomatinae (10 genera)

Diversity
- 4 subfamilies, c. 150 genera

= Sclerosomatidae =

Sclerosomatidae Temporal range: Jurassic–present

Family of harvestmen/daddy longlegs

The Sclerosomatidae are a family of harvestmen with about 1,300 known species. One former subfamily has been recently removed to form a new family, Globipedidae.

== Name ==
The name is combined from Ancient Greek skleros "hard" and soma "body".

== Genera ==
- Gagrellinae Thorell, 1889

- Abaetetuba Tourinho-Davis, 2004 (5 species)
- Adungrella Roewer, 1955 (3 species)
- Aguilaia González-Sponga, 2003 (1 species; Venezuela)
- Akalpia Roewer, 1915 (2 species; India and Japan)
- Altobunus Roewer, 1910 (3 species; Celebes and Philippines)
- Amazonesia Soares, 1970 (2 species)
- Antigrella Roewer, 1954 (1 species)
- Aurivilliola Roewer, 1910 (17 species; South and Southeast Asia)
- Azucarella Roewer, 1959 (1 species)
- Bakerinulus Roewer, 1955 (1 species)
- Bastia Roewer, 1910 (3 species; South and Southeast Asia)
- Bastioides Mello-Leitão, 1931 (1 species; South America)
- Baturitia Roewer, 1931 (1 species; Sunda Islands)
- Bellonia González-Sponga, 2003 (1 species; Venezuela)
- Biceropsis Roewer, 1935 (1 species; Burma)
- Bonthainia Roewer, 1913 (5 species; South and Southeast Asia)
- Bullobunus Roewer, 1910 (7 species; Philippines)
- Caluga Roewer, 1959 (1 species)
- Cardenalia Kury, 2017 (1 species; Venezuela)
- Carinobius Roewer, 1955 (1 species)
- Carmenia Roewer, 1915 (1 species; Colombia)
- Carmichaelus Roewer, 1929 (1 species; India)
- Ceratobunellus Roewer, 1911 (3 species; India)
- Ceratobunoides Roewer, 1923 (2 species; Sumatra)
- Ceratobunus Thorell, 1889 (13 species)
- Cervibunus Roewer, 1912 (3 Species; South and Southeast Asia)
- Chasenella Roewer, 1955 (2 species; Borneo)
- Chebabius Roewer, 1935 (1 species; Burma)
- Coonoora Roewer, 1929 (1 species; India)
- Dentobunus Roewer, 1910 (33 species; Southeast Asia)
- Diangathia Roewer, 1955 (1 species)
- Echinobunus Roewer, 1912 (1 species; Java)
- Euceratobunus Roewer, 1923 (1 species; India)
- Eugagrella Roewer, 1910 (25 species; South and Southeast Asia)
- Euzaleptus Roewer, 1911 (4 species; South and Southeast Asia)
- Fesa Roewer, 1953 (1 species)
- Gagrella Stoliczka, 1869 (226 species; Asia)
- Gagrellenna Roewer, 1929 (1 species; India)
- Gagrellina Roewer, 1913 (1 species; Celebes)
- Gagrellissa Roewer, 1931 (1 species; Sunda Islands)
- Gagrellopsis Sato & Suzuki, 1939 (1 species; Japan)
- Gagrellula Roewer, 1910 (67 species; Asia)
- Garleppa Roewer, 1912 (4 species; South America)
- Geaya Roewer, 1910 (82 species; Latin America)
- Globulosoma Martens, 1987 (2 species; Nepal)
- Guaranobunus Ringuelet, 1954 (1 species; Argentina)
- Hamitergum Crawford, 1992 (1 species; Russia)
- Harmanda Roewer, 1910 (15 species; Asia)
- Harmandina Schenkel, 1954 (1 species)
- Hehoa Roewer, 1929 (1 species; India)
- Heterogagrella Roewer, 1954 (2 species; Southeast Asia)
- Hexazaleptus Suzuki, 1966 (1 species)
- Hexomma Thorell, 1876 (9 species; Southeast Asia)
- Himaldroma Martens, 1987 (2 species; Nepal)
- Himalzaleptus Martens, 1987 (1 species; Nepal)
- Holcobunus Roewer, 1910 (26 or 27 species; Latin America)
- Holmbergiana Mello-Leitão, 1931 (3 species; South America)
- Hologagrella Roewer, 1910 (7 species; Southeast Asia)
- Hypogrella Roewer, 1955 (1 species)
- Hypsibunus Thorell, 1891 (11 species; India & Southeast Asia)
- Jussara Mello-Leitão, 1935 (10 species; South America)
- Koyamaia Suzuki, 1972 (1 species)
- Krusa Goodnight & Goodnight, 1947 (10 species; Mexico)
- Krusella Roewer, 1953 (1 species; Venezuela)
- Liopagus Chamberlin, 1916 (1 species)
- Marthana Thorell, 1891 (24 species; Southeast Asia)
- Melanopa Thorell, 1889 (30 species; India, Southeast Asia)
- Melanopella Roewer, 1931 (3 species; Sunda Islands)
- Melanopula Roewer, 1929 (5 species; South and Southeast Asia)
- Metadentobunus Roewer, 1915 (3 species; Taiwan)
- Metahehoa Suzuki, 1985 (1 species)
- Metasyleus Roewer, 1955 (3 species)
- Metaverpulus Roewer, 1912 (7 species; South Asia)
- Metazaleptus Roewer, 1912 (8 species; South and Southeast Asia)
- Microzaleptus Roewer, 1955 (1 species)
- Mitopiella Banks, 1930 (1 species)
- Mucuya González-Sponga, 2003 (1 species)
- Munequita Mello-Leitão, 1941 (1 species; Brazil)
- Neogagrella Roewer, 1913 (3 species; South and Southeast Asia)
- Nepalgrella Martens, 1987 (2 species; Nepal)
- Nepalkanchia Martens, 1990 (2 species; Nepal)
- Obigrella Roewer, 1955 (1 species)
- Octozaleptus Suzuki, 1966 (1 species)
- Onostemma Mello-Leitão, 1938 (2 species; Brazil)
- Oobunus Kishida, 1930 (1 species)
- Orissula Roewer, 1955 (1 species)
- Padangrella Roewer, 1954 (1 species)
- Palniella Roewer, 1929 (1 species; India)
- Paradentobunus Roewer, 1915 (1 species; India)
- Paragagrella Roewer, 1912 (5 species; South and Southeast Asia)
- Paragagrellina Schenkel, 1963 (1 species)
- Parageaya Mello-Leitão, 1933 (6 species; Latin America)
- Paratamboicus Mello-Leitão, 1940 (30 species; South America)
- Paraumbogrella Suzuki, 1963 (1 species)
- Paruleptes Soares, 1970 (1 species)
- Pectenobunus Roewer, 1910 (4 species; South America)
- Pergagrella Roewer, 1954 (1 species)
- Pokhara Suzuki, 1970 (7 species; Nepal)
- Prionostemma Pocock, 1903 (114 species; Mexico, Central America, and South America)
- Prodentobunus Roewer, 1923 (4 species; Asia)
- Psammogeaya Mello-Leitão, 1946 (1 species; Uruguay)
- Psathyropus L. Koch, 1878 (40 species; Asia)
- Pseudarthromerus Karsch, 1892 (1 species)
- Pseudogagrella Redikortsev, 1936 (13 species; East Asia)
- Pseudomelanopa Suzuki, 1974 (2 species; East Asia)
- Pseudosystenocentrus Suzuki, 1985 (1 species)
- Romerella Goodnight & Goodnight, 1943 (5 species; Mexico and South America)
- Sarasinia Roewer, 1913 (1 species; Celebes)
- Sataria Roewer, 1915 (3 species; India)
- Scotomenia Thorell, 1889 (1 species; Burma)
- Sericicorpus Martens, 1987 (1 species; Nepal)
- Sinadroma Roewer, 1955 (1 species)
- Syleus Thorell, 1876 (2 species; India)
- Syngagrella Roewer, 1913 (1 species; Celebes)
- Systenocentrus Simon, 1886 (6 species; Southeast and East Asia)
- Tamboicus Roewer, 1912 (3 species; South America)
- Taperina Roewer, 1953 (2 species)
- Tetraceratobunus Roewer, 1915 (3 species; South Asia)
- Thunbergia Martens, 2020 (4 species; South America)
- Toragrella Roewer, 1955 (2 species)
- Trachyrhinus Weed, 1892 (7 species; North America: Mexico and United States)
- Umbogrella Roewer, 1955 (1 species)
- Umbopilio Roewer, 1956 (2 species)
- Vaho González-Sponga, 2003 (1 species)
- Valle González-Sponga, 2003 (3 species)
- Varinodulia Canals, 1935 (1 species)
- Verpulus Simon, 1901 (13 species; South and Southeast Asia)
- Verrucobunus Roewer, 1931 (3 species; East and Southeast Asia)
- Xerogrella Martens, 1987 (1 species; Nepal)
- Zaleptiolus Roewer, 1955 (4 species; Asia)
- Zaleptulus Roewer, 1955 (3 species)
- Zaleptus Thorell, 1876 (72 species; Asia and Australia)

- Gyantinae Silhavý, 1946

- Gyas Simon, 1879 (1 species; Alps)
- Gyoides Martens, 1982 (6 species; Nepal)
- Rongsharia Roewer, 1957 (3 species; Nepal)

- Leiobuninae Banks, 1893

- Amilenoides Martens & Wijnhoven, 2022
- Cosmobunus Simon, 1879 (5 species; Spain and Mexico)
- Dilophiocara Redikorzev, 1931 (2 species)
- Eumesosoma Cokendolpher, 1980 (6 species; United States)
- Eusclera Roewer, 1910 (2 species; China and India)
- Goasheer Snegovaya, Cokendolpher & Mozaffarian, 2018
- Hadrobunus Banks, 1900 (2 species; United States)
- Kovalius Chemeris, 2023
- Leiobunum C.L.Koch, 1839 (126 species - 2 extinct fossils; worldwide)
- Leiolima Prieto & Wijnhoven, 2020
- Leuronychus Banks, 1900 (2 species; North America)
- Microliobunum Roewer, 1912 (2 species; Middle East)
- Nelima Roewer, 1910 (44 species; worldwide)
- Paranelima Caporiacco, 1938 (6 species; Mexico and Central America)
- Schenkeliobunum Starega, 1964 (1 species)
- Togwoteeus Roewer, 1952 (1 species; United States)
- †Amauropilio Mello-Leitão, 1937 (fossil) (2 species; fossils found in Colorado)

- Sclerosomatinae Simon, 1879

- Astrobunus Thorell, 1876 (10 species; Europe)
- Granulosoma Martens, 1973 (2 species; Himalayas)
- Homalenotus C.L.Koch, 1839 (10 species; Southern Europe and North Africa)
- Mastobunus Simon, 1879 (2 species; Southern Europe and North Africa)
- Metasclerosoma Roewer, 1912 (3 species; Europe)
- Pseudastrobunus Martens, 1973 (1 species, Himalayas)
- Pseudohomalenotus Caporiacco, 1935 (1 species; the Karakoram)
- Pygobunus Roewer, 1957 (2 species; Taiwan, Japan)
- Umbopilio Roewer, 1956 (2 species; India, Myanmar)

== Removed ==
- Caiza Roewer, 1925. Subjective synonym of Pectenobunus Roewer, 1910) in Tourinho, 2004a

- Pseudoarthromerus Karsch, 1891 (1 species; Japan, nomen nudum, therefore non-valid)
