= Ceratobunoides =

Scientific classification
- Domain: Eukaryota
- Kingdom: Animalia
- Phylum: Arthropoda
- Subphylum: Chelicerata
- Class: Arachnida
- Order: Opiliones
- Family: Sclerosomatidae
- Genus: Ceratobunoides; Roewer, 1923

Genus of harvestmen/daddy longlegs

Ceratobunoides is a genus of harvestmen in the family Sclerosomatidae from Sumatra.

== Species ==
- Ceratobunoides sumatranus Roewer, 1923
- Ceratobunoides bandarensis Roewer, 1955
