= Altobunus =

Scientific classification
- Domain: Eukaryota
- Kingdom: Animalia
- Phylum: Arthropoda
- Subphylum: Chelicerata
- Class: Arachnida
- Order: Opiliones
- Family: Sclerosomatidae
- Genus: Altobunus; Roewer, 1910

Genus of harvestmen/daddy longlegs

Altobunus is a genus of harvestmen in the family Sclerosomatidae from Celebes and the Philippines.

== Species ==
- Altobunus formosus Roewer, 1910
- Altobunus inermis (Simon, 1877)
- Altobunus maculatus Roewer, 1910
