= Liopagus =

Scientific classification
- Domain: Eukaryota
- Kingdom: Animalia
- Phylum: Arthropoda
- Subphylum: Chelicerata
- Class: Arachnida
- Order: Opiliones
- Family: Sclerosomatidae
- Genus: Liopagus; Chamberlin, 1916
- Species: L. simplex

Binomial name
- Liopagus simplex Chamberlin, 1916

Genus of harvestmen/daddy longlegs

Liopagus simplex is a species of harvestmen in a monotypic genus in the family Sclerosomatidae.
