= Chasenella =

Scientific classification
- Domain: Eukaryota
- Kingdom: Animalia
- Phylum: Arthropoda
- Subphylum: Chelicerata
- Class: Arachnida
- Order: Opiliones
- Family: Sclerosomatidae
- Genus: Chasenella; Roewer, 1955

Genus of harvestmen/daddy longlegs

Chasenella is a genus of harvestmen in the family Sclerosomatidae from Borneo.

== Species ==
- Chasenella luma Roewer, 1933
- Chasenella pakka Roewer, 1933
