= Tamboicus =

Scientific classification
- Domain: Eukaryota
- Kingdom: Animalia
- Phylum: Arthropoda
- Subphylum: Chelicerata
- Class: Arachnida
- Order: Opiliones
- Family: Sclerosomatidae
- Genus: Tamboicus; Roewer, 1912

Genus of harvestmen/daddy longlegs

Tamboicus is a genus of harvestmen in the family Sclerosomatidae from South America.

== Species ==
- Tamboicus fuhrmanni Roewer, 1912
- Tamboicus insularis (Canals, 1935)
- Tamboicus rufus Roewer, 1953
