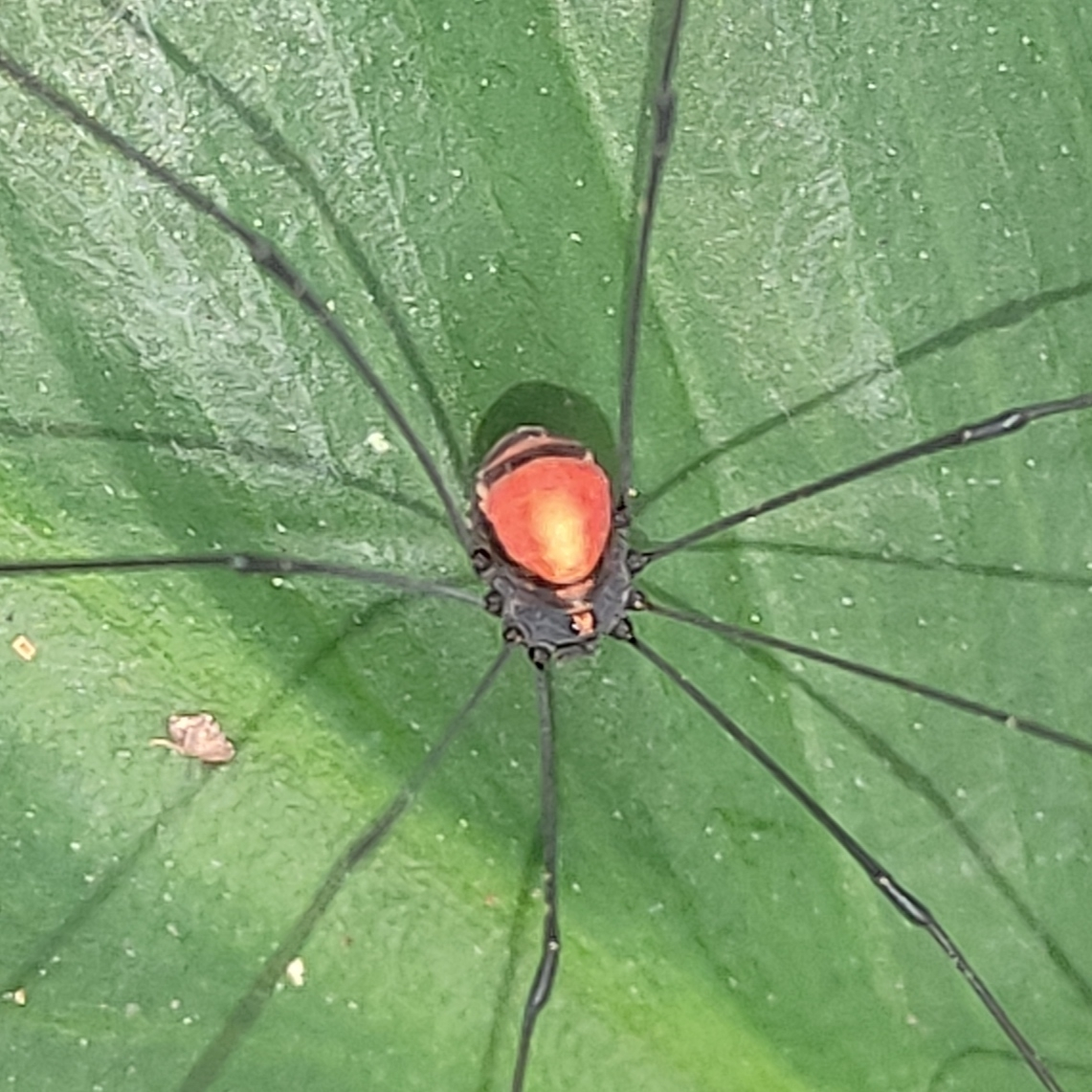
- Jussara flamengo

Scientific classification
- Domain: Eukaryota
- Kingdom: Animalia
- Phylum: Arthropoda
- Subphylum: Chelicerata
- Class: Arachnida
- Order: Opiliones
- Family: Sclerosomatidae
- Genus: Jussara; Mello-Leitão, 1935

= Jussara (harvestman) =

Genus of harvestmen/daddy longlegs

Jussara is a genus of harvestmen in the family Sclerosomatidae from South America.

== Species ==
The following species are recognised in the genus Jussara:

- Jussara albiarcuata Kury & Tourinho-Davis, 2003
- Jussara argentata (Roewer, 1953)
- Jussara atra (Roewer, 1910)
- Jussara aurantiaca Kury & Tourinho-Davis, 2003
- Jussara aureopunctata (Roewer, 1953)
- Jussara avati Kury & Tourinho-Davis, 2003
- Jussara flamengo Kury & Tourinho-Davis, 2003
- Jussara lineata (Roewer, 1953)
- Jussara luteovariata (Mello-Leitão, 1932)
- Jussara marmorata (Mello-Leitão, 1935)
- Jussara obesa Mello-Leitão, 1935
- Jussara quadrimaculata (Roewer, 1953)
- Jussara rosea (Mello-Leitão, 1940)
- Jussara taeniata Kury & Tourinho-Davis, 2003
- Jussara una Kury & Tourinho-Davis, 2003
