= Harmanda =

Scientific classification
- Domain: Eukaryota
- Kingdom: Animalia
- Phylum: Arthropoda
- Subphylum: Chelicerata
- Class: Arachnida
- Order: Opiliones
- Family: Sclerosomatidae
- Genus: Harmanda; Roewer, 1910

Genus of harvestmen/daddy longlegs

Harmanda is a genus of harvestmen in the family Sclerosomatidae from Asia.

== Species ==
- Harmanda aenescens (Roewer, 1911)
- Harmanda albipunctata (Roewer, 1915)
- Harmanda annulata (Roewer, 1911)
- Harmanda arunensis J. Martens, 1987
- Harmanda beroni J. Martens, 1987
- Harmanda corrugata J. Martens, 1987
- Harmanda elegantulus (Roewer, 1955)
- Harmanda instructa Roewer, 1910
- Harmanda khumbua J. Martens, 1987
- Harmanda latephippiata J. Martens, 1987
- Harmanda lineata (Roewer, 1911)
- Harmanda medioimmicans J. Martens, 1987
- Harmanda nigrolineata J. Martens, 1987
- Harmanda trimaculata Suzuki, 1977
- Harmanda triseriata Roewer, 1923
