= Paraumbogrella =

Scientific classification
- Domain: Eukaryota
- Kingdom: Animalia
- Phylum: Arthropoda
- Subphylum: Chelicerata
- Class: Arachnida
- Order: Opiliones
- Family: Sclerosomatidae
- Genus: Paraumbogrella; Suzuki, 1963
- Species: P. pumilio

Binomial name
- Paraumbogrella pumilio (Karsch, 1881)

Genus of harvestmen/daddy longlegs

Paraumbogrella pumilio is a species of harvestmen in a monotypic genus in the family Sclerosomatidae.
