= Romerella =

Scientific classification
- Domain: Eukaryota
- Kingdom: Animalia
- Phylum: Arthropoda
- Subphylum: Chelicerata
- Class: Arachnida
- Order: Opiliones
- Family: Sclerosomatidae
- Genus: Romerella; Goodnight & Goodnight, 1943

Synonyms
- Romeralla

Genus of harvestmen/daddy longlegs

Romerella is a genus of harvestmen in the family Sclerosomatidae. There are about five described species in Romerella.

== Species ==
These five species belong to the genus Romerella:

- Romerella bicolor Goodnight & Goodnight, 1944
- Romerella brasiliensis Goodnight & Goodnight, 1944
- Romerella catharina Goodnight & Goodnight, 1944
- Romerella punctata Goodnight & Goodnight, 1943
- Romerella reticulata Roewer, 1953
