= Sericicorpus =

Scientific classification
- Domain: Eukaryota
- Kingdom: Animalia
- Phylum: Arthropoda
- Subphylum: Chelicerata
- Class: Arachnida
- Order: Opiliones
- Family: Sclerosomatidae
- Genus: Sericicorpus; J. Martens, 1987
- Species: S. nigrum

Binomial name
- Sericicorpus nigrum J. Martens, 1987

Genus of harvestmen/daddy longlegs

Sericicorpus nigrum is a species of harvestmen in a monotypic genus in the family Sclerosomatidae from Nepal.
