= Hexazaleptus =

Scientific classification
- Domain: Eukaryota
- Kingdom: Animalia
- Phylum: Arthropoda
- Subphylum: Chelicerata
- Class: Arachnida
- Order: Opiliones
- Family: Sclerosomatidae
- Genus: Hexazaleptus; Suzuki, 1966
- Species: H. junbesi

Binomial name
- Hexazaleptus junbesi Suzuki, 1966

Genus of harvestmen/daddy longlegs

Hexazaleptus junbesi is a species of harvestmen in a monotypic genus in the family Sclerosomatidae.
