= Verrucobunus =

Scientific classification
- Domain: Eukaryota
- Kingdom: Animalia
- Phylum: Arthropoda
- Subphylum: Chelicerata
- Class: Arachnida
- Order: Opiliones
- Family: Sclerosomatidae
- Genus: Verrucobunus; Roewer, 1931

Genus of harvestmen/daddy longlegs

Verrucobunus is a genus of harvestmen in the family Sclerosomatidae from islands of East and Southeast Asia.

== Species ==
- Verrucobunus boninensis (S. Suzuki, 1978)
- Verrucobunus similis (S. Suzuki, 1978)
- Verrucobunus trispinosus Roewer, 1931
