= Coonoora =

Scientific classification
- Domain: Eukaryota
- Kingdom: Animalia
- Phylum: Arthropoda
- Subphylum: Chelicerata
- Class: Arachnida
- Order: Opiliones
- Family: Sclerosomatidae
- Genus: Coonoora; Roewer, 1929
- Species: C. biceratops

Binomial name
- Coonoora biceratops Roewer, 1929

Genus of harvestmen/daddy longlegs

Coonoora biceratops is a species of harvestmen in a monotypic genus in the family Sclerosomatidae from India.
