= Pseudomelanopa =

Scientific classification
- Domain: Eukaryota
- Kingdom: Animalia
- Phylum: Arthropoda
- Subphylum: Chelicerata
- Class: Arachnida
- Order: Opiliones
- Family: Sclerosomatidae
- Genus: Pseudomelanopa; Suzuki, 1974

Species
- P. liupan sp.nov.; P. taiwana

Genus of harvestmen/daddy longlegs

Pseudomelanopa is a genus of harvestmen in the family Sclerosomatidae. People used to think it is a monotypic genus. After another species in the genus, P. liupan sp.nov., was found in 2009, it now has 2 species.

== Species ==
- Pseudomelanopa liupan Zhang & Zhu, 2009 - China
- Pseudomelanopa taiwana Suzuki, 1974 - Taiwan
