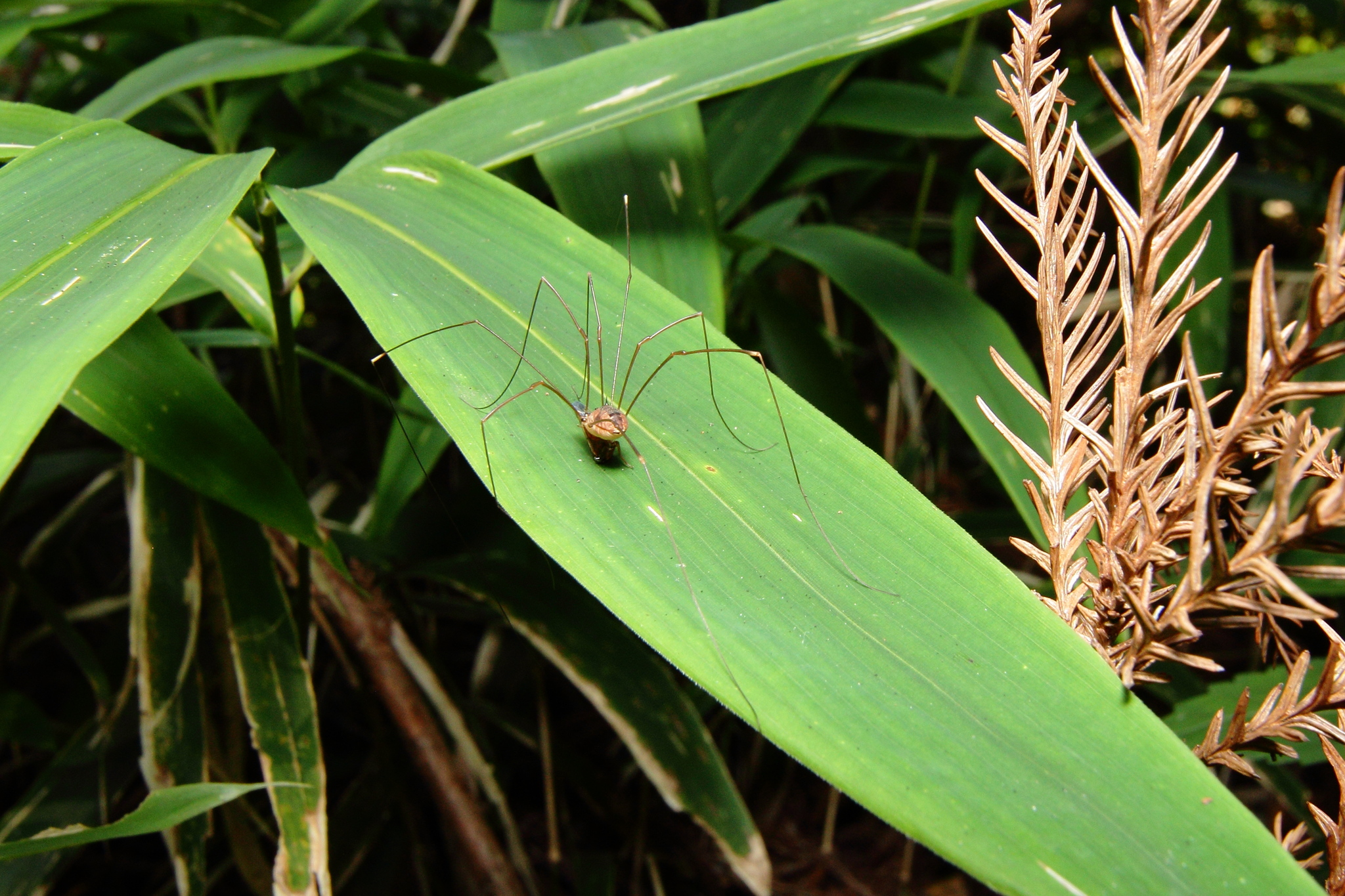
- Gagrellula ferruginea, Japan

Scientific classification
- Domain: Eukaryota
- Kingdom: Animalia
- Phylum: Arthropoda
- Subphylum: Chelicerata
- Class: Arachnida
- Order: Opiliones
- Family: Sclerosomatidae
- Subfamily: Gagrellinae
- Genus: Gagrellula; Roewer, 1910

= Gagrellula =

Genus of arachnids

Gagrellula is a genus of harvestmen in the family Sclerosomatidae. There are more than 60 described species in Gagrellula, found in southeast and east Asia.

== Species ==
These 67 species belong to the genus Gagrellula:

- Gagrellula aborana Roewer, 1954
- Gagrellula albatra Roewer, 1954
- Gagrellula albicoxa (Loman, 1892)
- Gagrellula albifrons Roewer, 1931
- Gagrellula albilineata Roewer, 1929
- Gagrellula albimarginata Suzuki, 1985
- Gagrellula albitarsis (Simon, 1899)
- Gagrellula annulata Roewer, 1910
- Gagrellula atra (Loman, 1892)
- Gagrellula aurilimbata Roewer, 1923
- Gagrellula auropunctata Roewer, 1954
- Gagrellula bicolor Roewer, 1954
- Gagrellula bimaculata Roewer, 1911
- Gagrellula bipunctata Roewer, 1912
- Gagrellula brunnea Roewer, 1935
- Gagrellula chamberlini Roewer, 1954
- Gagrellula circulata Roewer, 1954
- Gagrellula conspersa Roewer, 1954
- Gagrellula convexa Roewer, 1954
- Gagrellula crux (With, 1903)
- Gagrellula cuneimaculata Roewer, 1954
- Gagrellula cuprilucens Roewer, 1954
- Gagrellula curvispina Roewer, 1912
- Gagrellula didyma Roewer, 1935
- Gagrellula distincta (Sato & Suzuki, 1938)
- Gagrellula fasciata Roewer, 1954
- Gagrellula ferruginea Loman, 1902
- Gagrellula frontalis Roewer, 1954
- Gagrellula fuscanalis Roewer, 1954
- Gagrellula geminata Roewer, 1954
- Gagrellula gertschi Roewer, 1954
- Gagrellula giltayi Roewer, 1954
- Gagrellula grandis Suzuki, 1955
- Gagrellula granulata Suzuki, 1986
- Gagrellula heinrichi Roewer, 1954
- Gagrellula indigena Goodnight & Goodnight, 1944
- Gagrellula johorea Roewer, 1954
- Gagrellula kubotai Suzuki, 1986
- Gagrellula laeviscutum Roewer, 1954
- Gagrellula leucanta Roewer, 1954
- Gagrellula lomanii (Thorell, 1894)
- Gagrellula luteipalpis Roewer, 1954
- Gagrellula luteomaculata Roewer, 1931
- Gagrellula melanotarsus Roewer, 1911
- Gagrellula montana Sato & Suzuki, 1938
- Gagrellula niasensis (Thorell, 1890)
- Gagrellula niveata Roewer, 1954
- Gagrellula opposita Roewer, 1954
- Gagrellula orissa Roewer, 1954
- Gagrellula palawana Roewer, 1954
- Gagrellula pulverulenta Roewer, 1914
- Gagrellula rufifrons Roewer, 1954
- Gagrellula rufoscutum Roewer, 1912
- Gagrellula rutila Suzuki, 1985
- Gagrellula saddlana Roewer, 1929
- Gagrellula scabra Roewer, 1910
- Gagrellula schenkeli Roewer, 1954
- Gagrellula siberutiana Roewer, 1929
- Gagrellula simaluris Roewer, 1923
- Gagrellula simla Roewer, 1954
- Gagrellula simplex Roewer, 1954
- Gagrellula trichopalpis Roewer, 1954
- Gagrellula unicolor Roewer, 1910
- Gagrellula variegata Suzuki, 1985
- Gagrellula virescens Roewer, 1910
- Gagrellula viridula Roewer, 1929
- Gagrellula vittata Roewer, 1912
