= Eugagrella =

Scientific classification
- Domain: Eukaryota
- Kingdom: Animalia
- Phylum: Arthropoda
- Subphylum: Chelicerata
- Class: Arachnida
- Order: Opiliones
- Family: Sclerosomatidae
- Genus: Eugagrella; Roewer, 1910

Genus of harvestmen/daddy longlegs

Eugagrella is a genus of harvestmen in the family Sclerosomatidae from South and Southeast Asia.

== Species ==
- Eugagrella abdominalis Roewer, 1954
- Eugagrella aemula Roewer, 1954
- Eugagrella argentata Roewer, 1954
- Eugagrella barnesi Roewer, 1929
- Eugagrella bimaculata Suzuki, 1972
- Eugagrella carli Roewer, 1929
- Eugagrella celerrima (Loman, 1892)
- Eugagrella ceylonensis Roewer, 1954
- Eugagrella cuernosa Roewer, 1954
- Eugagrella fokiana Roewer, 1954
- Eugagrella jacobsoni Roewer, 1923
- Eugagrella laticlavia (Thorell, 1889)
- Eugagrella malabarica Roewer, 1954
- Eugagrella minima Roewer, 1954
- Eugagrella muara Roewer, 1923
- Eugagrella palliditarsus Roewer, 1923
- Eugagrella palnica Roewer, 1929
- Eugagrella rufescens (Thorell, 1889)
- Eugagrella rufispina Roewer, 1954
- Eugagrella simaluris Roewer, 1923
- Eugagrella stoliczkae (With, 1903)
- Eugagrella trimaculata Roewer, 1923
- Eugagrella variegata (Doleschall, 1859)
- Eugagrella yuennanana Roewer, 1954
- Eugagrella zilchi Roewer, 1954
