= Melanopula =

Scientific classification
- Domain: Eukaryota
- Kingdom: Animalia
- Phylum: Arthropoda
- Subphylum: Chelicerata
- Class: Arachnida
- Order: Opiliones
- Family: Sclerosomatidae
- Genus: Melanopula; Roewer, 1929

Genus of harvestmen/daddy longlegs

Melanopula is a genus of harvestmen in the family Sclerosomatidae from South and Southeast Asia.

== Species ==
- Melanopula biceps Roewer, 1929
- Melanopula cambodiana S. Suzuki, 1984
- Melanopula crassipes Suzuki, 1977
- Melanopula crassitarsis Roewer, 1955
- Melanopula shanensis Roewer, 1955
