= Granulosoma =

Scientific classification
- Domain: Eukaryota
- Kingdom: Animalia
- Phylum: Arthropoda
- Subphylum: Chelicerata
- Class: Arachnida
- Order: Opiliones
- Family: Sclerosomatidae
- Subfamily: Sclerosomatinae
- Genus: Granulosoma; Martens, 1973

Genus of harvestmen

Granulosoma is a genus of harvestmen in the family Sclerosomatidae. There are at least two described species in Granulosoma, found in the Himalayas of Nepal and India.

== Species ==
These two species belong to the genus Granulosoma:

- Granulosoma dissimile Martens, 2018
- Granulosoma umidulum Martens, 1973
