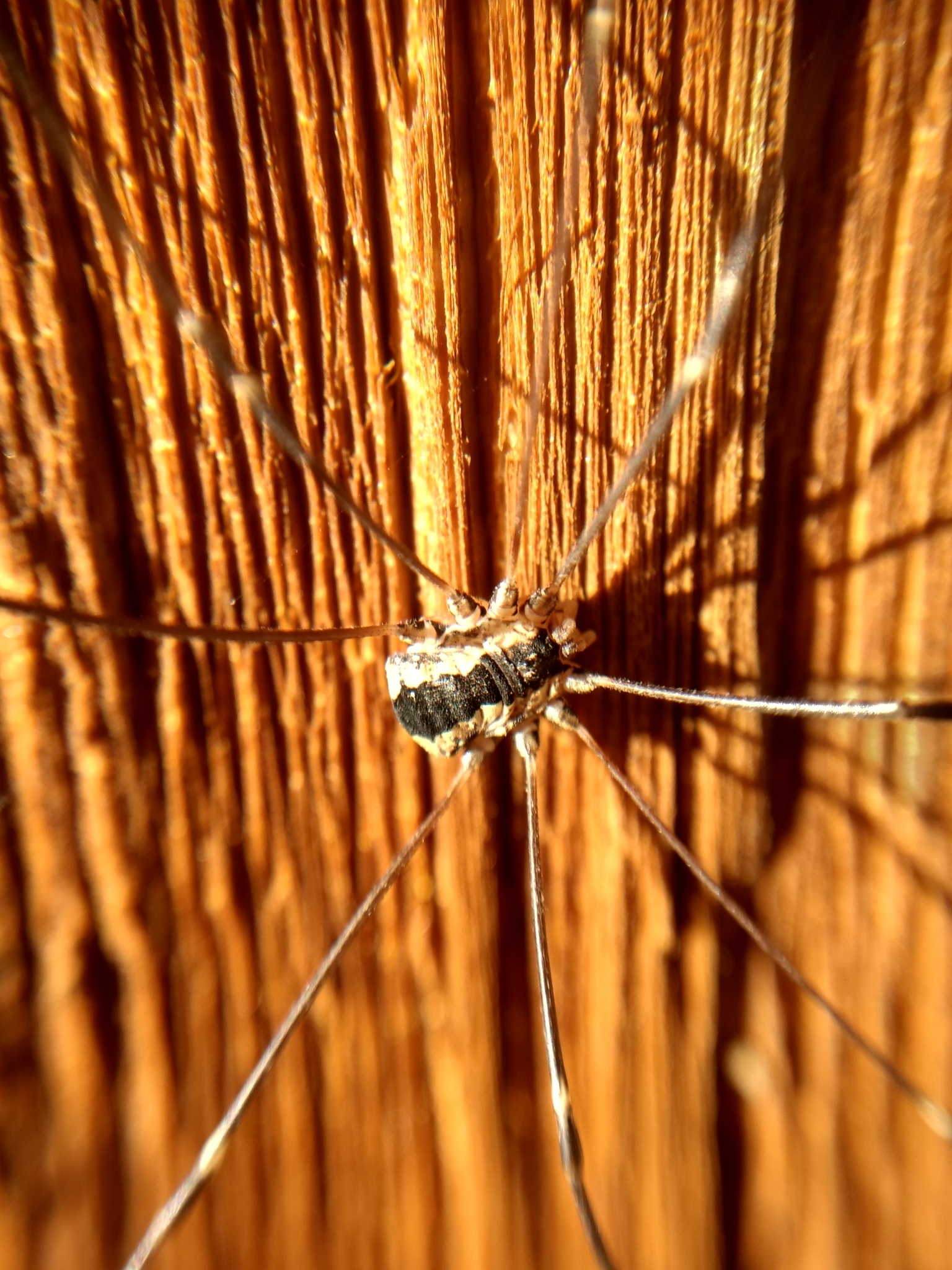
- Leuronychus pacificus

Scientific classification
- Domain: Eukaryota
- Kingdom: Animalia
- Phylum: Arthropoda
- Subphylum: Chelicerata
- Class: Arachnida
- Order: Opiliones
- Family: Sclerosomatidae
- Subfamily: Leiobuninae
- Genus: Leuronychus; Banks, 1900

Synonyms
- Microgyas Schenkel, 1951

= Leuronychus =

Genus of harvestmen/daddy longlegs

Leuronychus is a genus of harvestmen in the family Sclerosomatidae, found in North America.

== Species ==
These two species belong to the genus Leuronychus:

- Leuronychus fulviventris (Pickard-Cambridge, 1905) (Mexico)
- Leuronychus pacificus (Banks, 1894) (Pacific Coast of North America)
