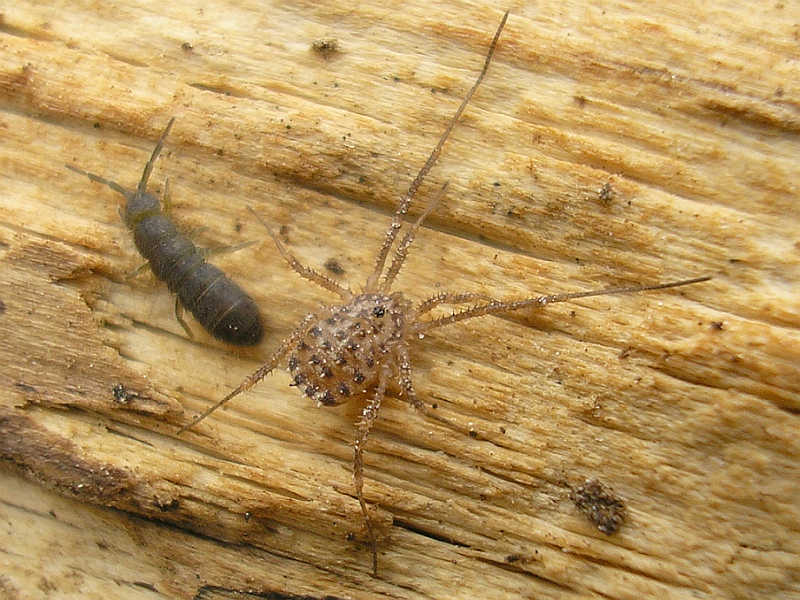
- Homalenotus quadridentatus, The Netherlands

Scientific classification
- Domain: Eukaryota
- Kingdom: Animalia
- Phylum: Arthropoda
- Subphylum: Chelicerata
- Class: Arachnida
- Order: Opiliones
- Family: Sclerosomatidae
- Subfamily: Sclerosomatinae
- Genus: Homalenotus; Koch, 1839

Synonyms
- Homalonotus Agassiz, 1846; Parasclerosoma Roewer, 1915; Sclerosoma Lucas, 1858

= Homalenotus =

Genus of harvestmen

Homalenotus is a genus of harvestmen in the family Sclerosomatidae. There are about 10 described species in Homalenotus, found in Europe and North Africa.

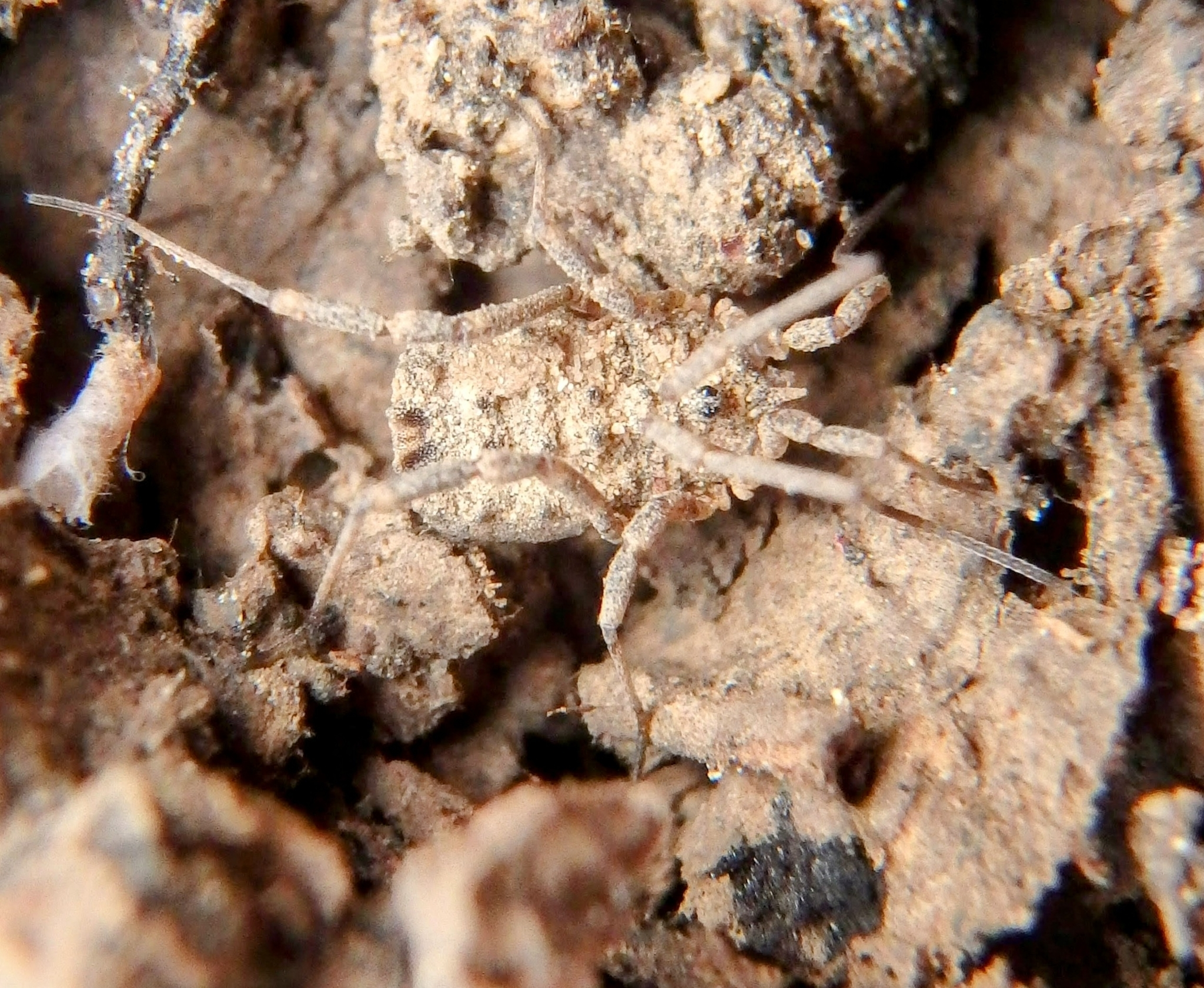
Homalenotus buchneri, Spain

== Species ==
These 10 species belong to the genus Homalenotus:

- Homalenotus armatus (Roewer, 1915)
- Homalenotus buchneri (Schenkel, 1936)
- Homalenotus coriaceus (Simon, 1879)
- Homalenotus graecus Roewer, 1957
- Homalenotus laranderas Grasshoff, 1959
- Homalenotus machadoi (Rambla, 1967)
- Homalenotus monoceros Koch, 1839
- Homalenotus oraniensis (Lucas, 1846)
- Homalenotus quadridentatus (Cuvier, 1795)
- Homalenotus remyi (Roewer, 1957)
