= Microliobunum =

Scientific classification
- Domain: Eukaryota
- Kingdom: Animalia
- Phylum: Arthropoda
- Subphylum: Chelicerata
- Class: Arachnida
- Order: Opiliones
- Family: Sclerosomatidae
- Subfamily: Leiobuninae
- Genus: Microliobunum; Roewer, 1912

Genus of harvestmen

Microliobunum is a genus of harvestmen in the family Sclerosomatidae. There are at least two described species in Microliobunum.

== Species ==
These two species belong to the genus Microliobunum:

- Microliobunum brevipes Roewer, 1912 (Lebanon)
- Microliobunum erseni Kurt, 2018 (Turkey)
