= Metadentobunus =

Scientific classification
- Domain: Eukaryota
- Kingdom: Animalia
- Phylum: Arthropoda
- Subphylum: Chelicerata
- Class: Arachnida
- Order: Opiliones
- Family: Sclerosomatidae
- Genus: Metadentobunus; Roewer, 1915

Genus of harvestmen/daddy longlegs

Metadentobunus is a genus of harvestmen in the family Sclerosomatidae, native to Taiwan. The genus traditionally consisted of just one species with two subspecies: M. formosae formosae and M. formosae garampiensis. However, a 2018 study by Chen and Shih identified a new species, Metadentobunus brevispinus, and raised the two prior subspecies up to separate species.

== Species ==
- Metadentobunus formosae Roewer, 1915
- Metadentobunus garampiensis Suzuki, 1944
- Metadentobunus brevispinus Chen & Shih, 2018
