= Chebabius =

Scientific classification
- Domain: Eukaryota
- Kingdom: Animalia
- Phylum: Arthropoda
- Subphylum: Chelicerata
- Class: Arachnida
- Order: Opiliones
- Family: Sclerosomatidae
- Genus: Chebabius; Roewer, 1935
- Species: C. angulatus

Binomial name
- Chebabius angulatus Roewer, 1935

Genus of harvestmen/daddy longlegs

Chebabius angulatus is a species of harvestmen in a monotypic genus in the family Sclerosomatidae from Burma.
