= Munequita =

Scientific classification
- Domain: Eukaryota
- Kingdom: Animalia
- Phylum: Arthropoda
- Subphylum: Chelicerata
- Class: Arachnida
- Order: Opiliones
- Family: Sclerosomatidae
- Genus: Munequita; Mello-Leitão, 1941
- Species: M. pulchra

Binomial name
- Munequita pulchra Mello-Leitão, 1941

Genus of harvestmen/daddy longlegs

Munequita pulchra is a species of harvestmen in a monotypic genus in the family Sclerosomatidae from Brazil.
