= Nepalgrella =

Scientific classification
- Domain: Eukaryota
- Kingdom: Animalia
- Phylum: Arthropoda
- Subphylum: Chelicerata
- Class: Arachnida
- Order: Opiliones
- Family: Sclerosomatidae
- Genus: Nepalgrella; J. Martens, 1987

Genus of harvestmen/daddy longlegs

Nepalgrella is a genus of harvestmen in the family Sclerosomatidae from Nepal.

== Species ==
- Nepalgrella kortaliensis J. Martens, 1987
- Nepalgrella yamputhini J. Martens, 1987
