= Ceratobunellus =

Scientific classification
- Domain: Eukaryota
- Kingdom: Animalia
- Phylum: Arthropoda
- Subphylum: Chelicerata
- Class: Arachnida
- Order: Opiliones
- Family: Sclerosomatidae
- Genus: Ceratobunellus; Roewer, 1911

Genus of harvestmen/daddy longlegs

Ceratobunellus is a genus of harvestmen in the family Sclerosomatidae from India.

== Species ==
- Ceratobunellus calcuttensis (With, 1903)
- Ceratobunellus brevipes (With, 1903)
- Ceratobunellus philippinus Roewer, 1955
