= Globulosoma =

Scientific classification
- Domain: Eukaryota
- Kingdom: Animalia
- Phylum: Arthropoda
- Subphylum: Chelicerata
- Class: Arachnida
- Order: Opiliones
- Family: Sclerosomatidae
- Genus: Globulosoma; J. Martens, 1987

Genus of harvestmen/daddy longlegs

Globulosoma is a genus of harvestmen in the family Sclerosomatidae from Nepal.

== Species ==
- Globulosoma gandakense J. Martens, 1987
- Globulosoma montivaga J. Martens, 1987
