= Eusclera =

Scientific classification
- Domain: Eukaryota
- Kingdom: Animalia
- Phylum: Arthropoda
- Subphylum: Chelicerata
- Class: Arachnida
- Order: Opiliones
- Family: Sclerosomatidae
- Subfamily: Leiobuninae
- Genus: Eusclera; Roewer, 1910

Synonyms
- Euscelera; Eusclerella Roewer, 1910

Genus of harvestmen

Eusclera is a genus of harvestmen in the family Sclerosomatidae. There are at least two described species in Eusclera.

== Species ==
These two species belong to the genus Eusclera:

- Eusclera aureomaculata Roewer, 1910 (China)
- Eusclera indica Turk, 1948 (India)
