= Onostemma =

Scientific classification
- Domain: Eukaryota
- Kingdom: Animalia
- Phylum: Arthropoda
- Subphylum: Chelicerata
- Class: Arachnida
- Order: Opiliones
- Family: Sclerosomatidae
- Genus: Onostemma; Mello-Leitão, 1938

Genus of harvestmen/daddy longlegs

Onostemma is a genus of harvestmen in the family Sclerosomatidae from Brazil.

== Species ==
- Onostemma imitans Mello-Leitão, 1938
- Onostemma maculatipes Roewer, 1953
