= Adungrella =

Scientific classification
- Domain: Eukaryota
- Kingdom: Animalia
- Phylum: Arthropoda
- Subphylum: Chelicerata
- Class: Arachnida
- Order: Opiliones
- Family: Sclerosomatidae
- Subfamily: Gagrellinae
- Genus: Adungrella; Roewer, 1955

Genus of harvestmen/daddy longlegs

Adungrella is a genus of harvestmen in the family Sclerosomatidae. There are at least three described species in Adungrella.

== Species ==
These three species belong to the genus Adungrella:

- Adungrella aenea Roewer, 1955 (Kachin)
- Adungrella atrorubra Suzuki, 1967
- Adungrella punctulata Roewer, 1955
