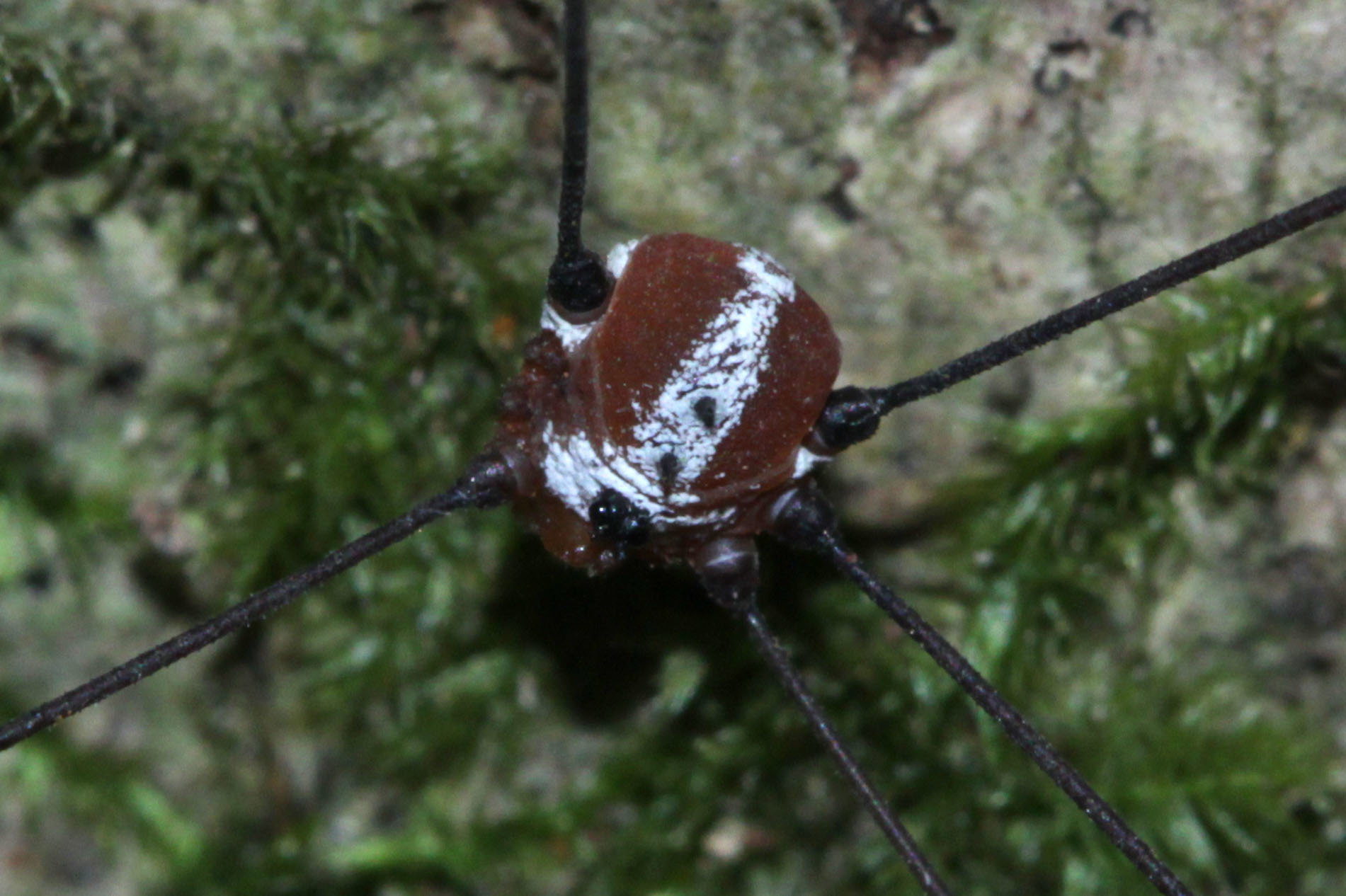
- Dentobunus balicus, Indonesia

Scientific classification
- Domain: Eukaryota
- Kingdom: Animalia
- Phylum: Arthropoda
- Subphylum: Chelicerata
- Class: Arachnida
- Order: Opiliones
- Family: Sclerosomatidae
- Genus: Dentobunus; Roewer, 1910

= Dentobunus =

Genus of harvestmen/daddy longlegs

Dentobunus is a genus of harvestmen in the family Sclerosomatidae from Southeast Asia.

== Species ==
- Dentobunus acuarius (Thorell, 1891)
- Dentobunus albiannulatus Roewer, 1929
- Dentobunus auratus Roewer, 1910
- Dentobunus aurolucens Roewer, 1923
- Dentobunus balicus Roewer, 1931
- Dentobunus bicorniger (Simon, 1901)
- Dentobunus bidentatus (Thorell, 1891)
- Dentobunus basalis Roewer, 1931
- Dentobunus bicoronatus Roewer, 1931
- Dentobunus buruensis Roewer, 1955
- Dentobunus chaetopus (Thorell, 1889)
- Dentobunus cupreus Roewer, 1955
- Dentobunus dentatus (With, 1903)
- Dentobunus distichus Roewer, 1955
- Dentobunus feuerborni Roewer, 1931
- Dentobunus imperator (With, 1903)
- Dentobunus insignitus Roewer, 1910
- Dentobunus kraepelinii Roewer, 1910
- Dentobunus luteus Roewer, 1910
- Dentobunus magnificus Roewer, 1912
- Dentobunus pulcer Suzuki, 1970
- Dentobunus punctipes Roewer, 1931
- Dentobunus quadridentatus Roewer, 1923
- Dentobunus quadrispinosus Suzuki, 1977
- Dentobunus ramicornis (Thorell, 1894)
- Dentobunus renschi Roewer, 1931
- Dentobunus rufus Roewer, 1910
- Dentobunus selangoris Roewer, 1955
- Dentobunus siamensis Roewer, 1955
- Dentobunus tenuis (Loman, 1892)
- Dentobunus unicolor Roewer, 1911
- Dentobunus waigeuensis Roewer, 1955

Note: The above names "albiannulatus", "pulcer" "renschi" and "waigeuensis" are correct spellings of the original authors, differing from misspellings in Hallan. Else excluding "Dentobunus albimaculatus" as an original misspelling copied by Hallan.
