= Baturitia =

Scientific classification
- Domain: Eukaryota
- Kingdom: Animalia
- Phylum: Arthropoda
- Subphylum: Chelicerata
- Class: Arachnida
- Order: Opiliones
- Family: Sclerosomatidae
- Genus: Baturitia; Roewer, 1931
- Species: B. trispinosa

Binomial name
- Baturitia trispinosa Roewer, 1931

Genus of harvestmen/daddy longlegs

Baturitia trispinosa is a species of harvestmen in a monotypic genus in the family Sclerosomatidae from the Sunda Islands.
