= Amilenoides =

Scientific classification
- Domain: Eukaryota
- Kingdom: Animalia
- Phylum: Arthropoda
- Subphylum: Chelicerata
- Class: Arachnida
- Order: Opiliones
- Family: Sclerosomatidae
- Subfamily: Leiobuninae
- Genus: Amilenoides; Martens & Wijnhoven, 2022
- Species: A. caucasicus

Binomial name
- Amilenoides caucasicus Martens & Wijnhoven, 2022

Genus of harvestmen

Amilenoides is a genus of harvestmen in the family Sclerosomatidae. This genus has a single species, Amilenoides caucasicus, found in Russia.
