= Neogagrella =

Scientific classification
- Domain: Eukaryota
- Kingdom: Animalia
- Phylum: Arthropoda
- Subphylum: Chelicerata
- Class: Arachnida
- Order: Opiliones
- Family: Sclerosomatidae
- Genus: Neogagrella; Roewer, 1913

Genus of harvestmen/daddy longlegs

Neogagrella is a genus of harvestmen in the family Sclerosomatidae from South and Southeast Asia.

== Species ==
- Neogagrella balica Roewer, 1931
- Neogagrella barnesi Roewer, 1929
- Neogagrella eximia Roewer, 1913
