= Akalpia =

Scientific classification
- Domain: Eukaryota
- Kingdom: Animalia
- Phylum: Arthropoda
- Subphylum: Chelicerata
- Class: Arachnida
- Order: Opiliones
- Family: Sclerosomatidae
- Genus: Akalpia; Roewer, 1915

Genus of harvestmen/daddy longlegs

Akalpia is a genus of harvestmen in the family Sclerosomatidae from India and Japan.

== Species ==
- Akalpia oblonga Roewer, 1915
- Akalpia nipponica Sato & Suzuki, 1938
