= Echinobunus =

Scientific classification
- Domain: Eukaryota
- Kingdom: Animalia
- Phylum: Arthropoda
- Subphylum: Chelicerata
- Class: Arachnida
- Order: Opiliones
- Family: Sclerosomatidae
- Genus: Echinobunus; Roewer, 1912
- Species: E. elegans

Binomial name
- Echinobunus elegans Roewer, 1912

Genus of harvestmen/daddy longlegs

Echinobunus elegans is a species of harvestmen in a monotypic genus in the family Sclerosomatidae from Java.
