= Taperina =

Scientific classification
- Domain: Eukaryota
- Kingdom: Animalia
- Phylum: Arthropoda
- Subphylum: Chelicerata
- Class: Arachnida
- Order: Opiliones
- Family: Sclerosomatidae
- Genus: Taperina; Roewer, 1953

Genus of harvestmen/daddy longlegs

Taperina is a genus of harvestmen in the family Sclerosomatidae.

== Species ==
- Taperina lutea Roewer, 1953
- Taperina nigripes Roewer, 1953
