= Paruleptes =

Scientific classification
- Domain: Eukaryota
- Kingdom: Animalia
- Phylum: Arthropoda
- Subphylum: Chelicerata
- Class: Arachnida
- Order: Opiliones
- Family: Sclerosomatidae
- Genus: Paruleptes; Soares, 1970
- Species: P. coronatus

Binomial name
- Paruleptes coronatus Soares, 1970

Genus of harvestmen/daddy longlegs

Paruleptes coronatus is a species of harvestmen in a monotypic genus in the family Sclerosomatidae.
