= Caiza =

Scientific classification
- Domain: Eukaryota
- Kingdom: Animalia
- Phylum: Arthropoda
- Subphylum: Chelicerata
- Class: Arachnida
- Order: Opiliones
- Family: Sclerosomatidae
- Genus: Caiza; Roewer, 1925

Genus of harvestmen/daddy longlegs

Caiza is a genus of harvestmen in the family Sclerosomatidae from South America.

== Species ==
- Caiza argentina Ringuelet, 1959
- Caiza colliculosa Roewer, 1925
