= Carinobius =

Scientific classification
- Domain: Eukaryota
- Kingdom: Animalia
- Phylum: Arthropoda
- Subphylum: Chelicerata
- Class: Arachnida
- Order: Opiliones
- Family: Sclerosomatidae
- Genus: Carinobius; Roewer, 1955
- Species: C. bicornutus

Binomial name
- Carinobius bicornutus Roewer, 1955

Genus of harvestmen/daddy longlegs

Carinobius bicornutus is a species of harvestmen in a monotypic genus in the family Sclerosomatidae.
