= Carmichaelus =

Scientific classification
- Domain: Eukaryota
- Kingdom: Animalia
- Phylum: Arthropoda
- Subphylum: Chelicerata
- Class: Arachnida
- Order: Opiliones
- Family: Sclerosomatidae
- Genus: Carmichaelus; Roewer, 1929
- Species: C. maculatus

Binomial name
- Carmichaelus maculatus Roewer, 1929

Genus of harvestmen/daddy longlegs

Carmichaelus maculatus is a species of harvestmen in a monotypic genus in the family Sclerosomatidae from India.
