= Paradentobunus =

Scientific classification
- Domain: Eukaryota
- Kingdom: Animalia
- Phylum: Arthropoda
- Subphylum: Chelicerata
- Class: Arachnida
- Order: Opiliones
- Family: Sclerosomatidae
- Genus: Paradentobunus; Roewer, 1915
- Species: P. aureomaculatus

Binomial name
- Paradentobunus aureomaculatus Roewer, 1915

Genus of harvestmen/daddy longlegs

Paradentobunus aureomaculatus is a species of harvestmen in a monotypic genus in the family Sclerosomatidae from India.
