= Bastia (harvestman) =

Scientific classification
- Domain: Eukaryota
- Kingdom: Animalia
- Phylum: Arthropoda
- Subphylum: Chelicerata
- Class: Arachnida
- Order: Opiliones
- Family: Sclerosomatidae
- Genus: Bastia; Roewer, 1910

Genus of harvestmen/daddy longlegs

Bastia is a genus of harvestmen in the family Sclerosomatidae from South and Southeast Asia.

== Species ==
- Bastia lineata Roewer, 1910
- Bastia elegans Suzuki, 1977
- Bastia guttata Banks, 1930
