= Hehoa =

Scientific classification
- Domain: Eukaryota
- Kingdom: Animalia
- Phylum: Arthropoda
- Subphylum: Chelicerata
- Class: Arachnida
- Order: Opiliones
- Family: Sclerosomatidae
- Genus: Hehoa; Roewer, 1929
- Species: H. bunigera

Binomial name
- Hehoa bunigera Roewer, 1929

Genus of harvestmen

Hehoa is a genus of harvestmen in the family Sclerosomatidae. The genus contains the single species Hehoa bunigera.
