= Orissula =

Scientific classification
- Domain: Eukaryota
- Kingdom: Animalia
- Phylum: Arthropoda
- Subphylum: Chelicerata
- Class: Arachnida
- Order: Opiliones
- Family: Sclerosomatidae
- Genus: Orissula; Roewer, 1955
- Species: O. heterospinulata

Binomial name
- Orissula heterospinulata Roewer, 1955

Genus of harvestmen/daddy longlegs

Orissula heterospinulata is a species of harvestmen in a monotypic genus in the family Sclerosomatidae.
