= Oobunus =

Scientific classification
- Domain: Eukaryota
- Kingdom: Animalia
- Phylum: Arthropoda
- Subphylum: Chelicerata
- Class: Arachnida
- Order: Opiliones
- Family: Sclerosomatidae
- Genus: Oobunus; Kishida, 1930
- Species: O. schizops

Binomial name
- Oobunus schizops Kishida, 1930

Genus of harvestmen/daddy longlegs

Oobunus schizops is a species of harvestmen in a monotypic genus in the family Sclerosomatidae.
