= Metahehoa =

Scientific classification
- Domain: Eukaryota
- Kingdom: Animalia
- Phylum: Arthropoda
- Subphylum: Chelicerata
- Class: Arachnida
- Order: Opiliones
- Family: Sclerosomatidae
- Genus: Metahehoa; Suzuki, 1985
- Species: M. granulata

Binomial name
- Metahehoa granulata Suzuki, 1985

Genus of harvestmen/daddy longlegs

Metahehoa granulata is a species of harvestmen in a monotypic genus in the family Sclerosomatidae.
