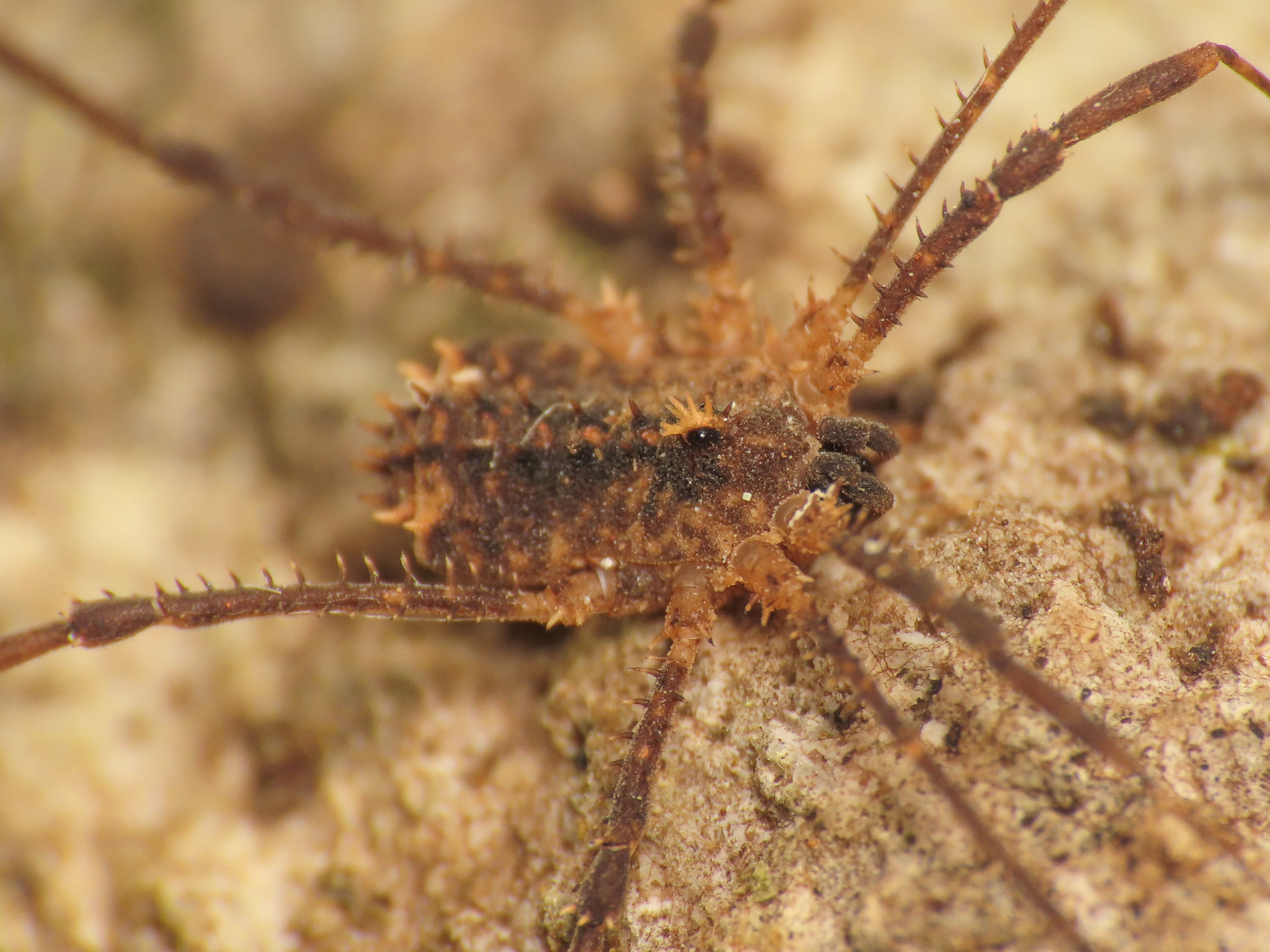
- Astrobunus kochii, Italy

Scientific classification
- Domain: Eukaryota
- Kingdom: Animalia
- Phylum: Arthropoda
- Subphylum: Chelicerata
- Class: Arachnida
- Order: Opiliones
- Family: Sclerosomatidae
- Subfamily: Sclerosomatinae
- Genus: Astrobunus; Thorell, 1876

Synonyms
- Hoplites Koch, 1869; Roeweriolus Kolosváry, 1933

= Astrobunus =

Genus of harvestmen

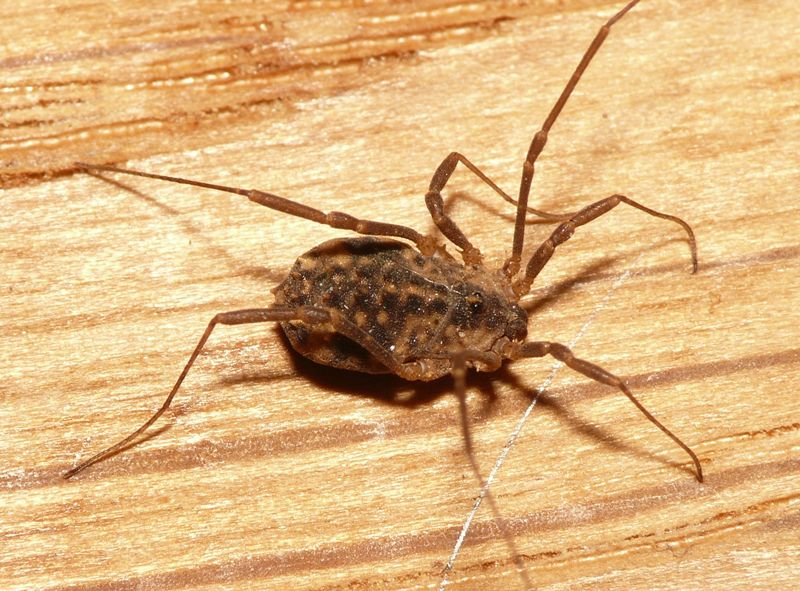
Astrobunus laevipes, the Netherlands

Astrobunus is a genus of harvestmen in the family Sclerosomatidae. There are about 10 described species in Astrobunus, found in Europe.

== Species ==
These 10 species belong to the genus Astrobunus:

- Astrobunus bernardinus Simon, 1879
- Astrobunus dinaricus Roewer, 1915
- Astrobunus grallator Simon, 1879
- Astrobunus helleri (Ausserer, 1867)
- Astrobunus kochi Thorell, 1876
- Astrobunus kochii Thorell, 1876
- Astrobunus laevipes (Canestrini, 1872)
- Astrobunus osellai Chemini, 1986
- Astrobunus roeweri Hadži, 1927
- Astrobunus spinosus (Herbst, 1799)
