= Metaverpulus =

Scientific classification
- Domain: Eukaryota
- Kingdom: Animalia
- Phylum: Arthropoda
- Subphylum: Chelicerata
- Class: Arachnida
- Order: Opiliones
- Family: Sclerosomatidae
- Genus: Metaverpulus; Roewer, 1912

Genus of harvestmen/daddy longlegs

Metaverpulus is a genus of harvestmen in the family Sclerosomatidae from South Asia.

== Species ==
- Metaverpulus bhutanicus J. Martens, 1987
- Metaverpulus distinctus Suzuki, 1970
- Metaverpulus hirsutus Roewer, 1912
- Metaverpulus kanchensis J. Martens, 1987
- Metaverpulus laevis Roewer, 1955
- Metaverpulus multidentatus J. Martens, 1987
- Metaverpulus persimilis J. Martens, 1987
