= Paragagrellina =

Scientific classification
- Domain: Eukaryota
- Kingdom: Animalia
- Phylum: Arthropoda
- Subphylum: Chelicerata
- Class: Arachnida
- Order: Opiliones
- Family: Sclerosomatidae
- Genus: Paragagrellina; Schenkel, 1963
- Species: P. legendrei

Binomial name
- Paragagrellina legendrei Schenkel, 1963

Genus of harvestmen/daddy longlegs

Paragagrellina legendrei is a species of harvestmen in a monotypic genus in the family Sclerosomatidae.
