= Mastobunus =

Scientific classification
- Domain: Eukaryota
- Kingdom: Animalia
- Phylum: Arthropoda
- Subphylum: Chelicerata
- Class: Arachnida
- Order: Opiliones
- Family: Sclerosomatidae
- Subfamily: Sclerosomatinae
- Genus: Mastobunus; Simon, 1879

Genus of harvestmen

Mastobunus is a genus of harvestmen in the family Sclerosomatidae. There are at least two described species in Mastobunus, found in southern Europe and North Africa.

== Species ==
These two species belong to the genus Mastobunus:

- Mastobunus ignotus Perera, 1990
- Mastobunus tuberculifer (Lucas, 1846)
