= Padangrella =

Scientific classification
- Domain: Eukaryota
- Kingdom: Animalia
- Phylum: Arthropoda
- Subphylum: Chelicerata
- Class: Arachnida
- Order: Opiliones
- Family: Sclerosomatidae
- Genus: Padangrella; Roewer, 1954
- Species: P. jacobsoni

Binomial name
- Padangrella jacobsoni Roewer, 1954

Genus of harvestmen/daddy longlegs

Padangrella jacobsoni is a species of harvestmen in a monotypic genus in the family Sclerosomatidae.
