= Palniella =

Scientific classification
- Domain: Eukaryota
- Kingdom: Animalia
- Phylum: Arthropoda
- Subphylum: Chelicerata
- Class: Arachnida
- Order: Opiliones
- Family: Sclerosomatidae
- Genus: Palniella; Roewer, 1929
- Species: P. virididorsata

Binomial name
- Palniella virididorsata Roewer, 1929

Genus of harvestmen/daddy longlegs

Palniella virididorsata is a species of harvestmen in a monotypic genus in the family Sclerosomatidae from India.
