= Cervibunus =

Scientific classification
- Domain: Eukaryota
- Kingdom: Animalia
- Phylum: Arthropoda
- Subphylum: Chelicerata
- Class: Arachnida
- Order: Opiliones
- Family: Sclerosomatidae
- Genus: Cervibunus; Roewer, 1912

Genus of harvestmen/daddy longlegs

Cervibunus is a genus of harvestmen in the family Sclerosomatidae from South and Southeast Asia.

== Species ==
- Cervibunus ater Roewer, 1955
- Cervibunus maculatus Roewer, 1912
- Cervibunus ornatus Roewer, 1929
