= Aurivilliola =

Scientific classification
- Domain: Eukaryota
- Kingdom: Animalia
- Phylum: Arthropoda
- Subphylum: Chelicerata
- Class: Arachnida
- Order: Opiliones
- Family: Sclerosomatidae
- Genus: Aurivilliola; Roewer, 1910

Genus of harvestmen/daddy longlegs

Aurivilliola is a genus of harvestmen in the family Sclerosomatidae from South and Southeast Asia.

== Species ==
- Aurivilliola annamensis Roewer, 1927
- Aurivilliola aurivillii (Thorell, 1894)
- Aurivilliola bispinifera Roewer, 1929
- Aurivilliola difformis Roewer, 1955
- Aurivilliola ephippiata Roewer, 1955
- Aurivilliola fagei Schenkel, 1963
- Aurivilliola femoralis Roewer, 1955
- Aurivilliola hirsuta Roewer, 1915
- Aurivilliola javana Roewer, 1931
- Aurivilliola nigripalpis Roewer, 1929
- Aurivilliola palpalis Roewer, 1915
- Aurivilliola segregata Roewer, 1955
- Aurivilliola sepia (Loman, 1892)
- Aurivilliola shanica Roewer, 1929
- Aurivilliola sumatrana Roewer, 1931
- Aurivilliola tibialis Roewer, 1955
- Aurivilliola timorensis Schenkel, 1944
