= Euzaleptus =

Scientific classification
- Kingdom: Animalia
- Phylum: Arthropoda
- Subphylum: Chelicerata
- Class: Arachnida
- Order: Opiliones
- Family: Sclerosomatidae
- Subfamily: Gagrellinae
- Genus: Euzaleptus; Roewer, 1911

Genus of harvestmen/daddy longlegs

Euzaleptus is a genus of harvestmen in the family Sclerosomatidae from South and Southeast Asia.

== Species ==
- Euzaleptus minutus (With, 1903)
- Euzaleptus sarawakensis Roewer, 1911
- Euzaleptus pilosus
- Euzaleptus muticus
