= Metasclerosoma =

Scientific classification
- Domain: Eukaryota
- Kingdom: Animalia
- Phylum: Arthropoda
- Subphylum: Chelicerata
- Class: Arachnida
- Order: Opiliones
- Family: Sclerosomatidae
- Subfamily: Sclerosomatinae
- Genus: Metasclerosoma; Roewer, 1912

Synonyms
- Neosclerosoma Roewer, 1923; Prosclerosoma Roewer, 1915

Genus of harvestmen

Metasclerosoma is a genus of harvestmen in the family Sclerosomatidae. There are at least three described species in Metasclerosoma, found in Europe.

== Species ==
These three species belong to the genus Metasclerosoma:

- Metasclerosoma depressum (Canestrini, 1872)
- Metasclerosoma sardum (Thorell, 1876)
- Metasclerosoma siculum Marcellino, 1970
