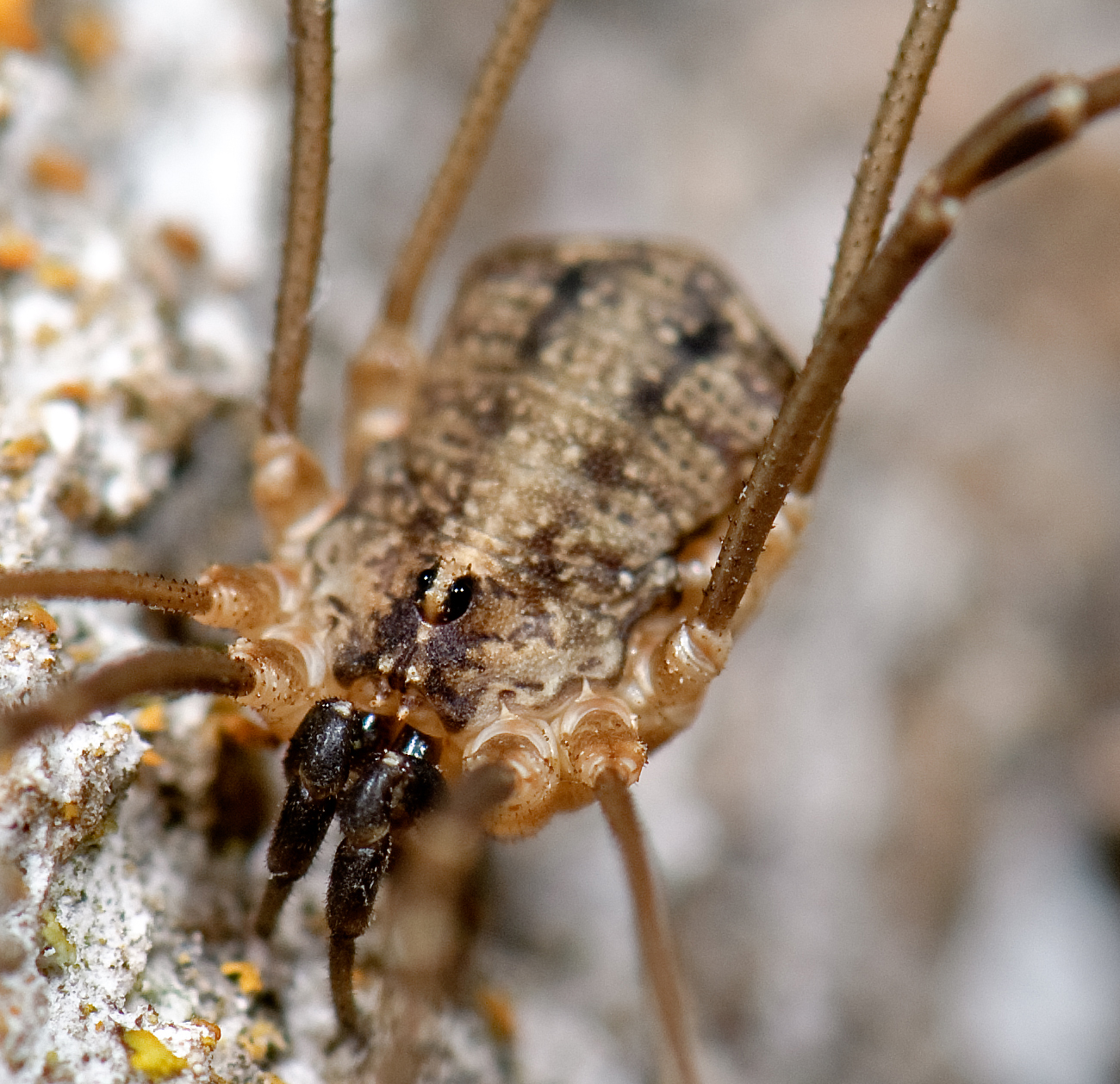

Scientific classification
- Kingdom: Animalia
- Phylum: Arthropoda
- Subphylum: Chelicerata
- Class: Arachnida
- Order: Opiliones
- Family: Sclerosomatidae
- Subfamily: Leiobuninae
- Genus: Togwoteeus; Roewer, 1952
- Species: T. biceps

Binomial name
- Togwoteeus biceps (Thorell, 1877)

= Togwoteeus =

Genus of harvestmen

Togwoteeus is a genus of harvestmen in the family Sclerosomatidae. This genus has a single species, Togwoteeus biceps, which is found mainly in western North America.
