= Guaranobunus =

Scientific classification
- Domain: Eukaryota
- Kingdom: Animalia
- Phylum: Arthropoda
- Subphylum: Chelicerata
- Class: Arachnida
- Order: Opiliones
- Family: Sclerosomatidae
- Genus: Guaranobunus; Ringuelet, 1954
- Species: G. guaraniticus

Binomial name
- Guaranobunus guaraniticus Ringuelet, 1954

Genus of harvestmen/daddy longlegs

Guaranobunus guaraniticus is a species of harvestmen in a monotypic genus in the family Sclerosomatidae from Argentina.
