= Bullobunus =

Scientific classification
- Domain: Eukaryota
- Kingdom: Animalia
- Phylum: Arthropoda
- Subphylum: Chelicerata
- Class: Arachnida
- Order: Opiliones
- Family: Sclerosomatidae
- Genus: Bullobunus; Roewer, 1910

Genus of harvestmen/daddy longlegs

Bullobunus is a genus of harvestmen in the family Sclerosomatidae from the Philippines.

== Species ==
- Bullobunus ater Roewer, 1910
- Bullobunus culionicus Suzuki, 1977
- Bullobunus luteovittatus Roewer, 1910
- Bullobunus punctatus Suzuki, 1977
- Bullobunus rufus Roewer, 1955
- Bullobunus similis Roewer, 1910
- Bullobunus unicolor Suzuki, 1977
