= Scotomenia =

Scientific classification
- Domain: Eukaryota
- Kingdom: Animalia
- Phylum: Arthropoda
- Subphylum: Chelicerata
- Class: Arachnida
- Order: Opiliones
- Family: Sclerosomatidae
- Genus: Scotomenia; Thorell, 1889
- Species: S. cetrata

Binomial name
- Scotomenia cetrata Thorell, 1889

Genus of harvestmen/daddy longlegs

Scotomenia cetrata is a species of harvestmen in a monotypic genus in the family Sclerosomatidae from Burma.
