= Heterogagrella =

Scientific classification
- Domain: Eukaryota
- Kingdom: Animalia
- Phylum: Arthropoda
- Subphylum: Chelicerata
- Class: Arachnida
- Order: Opiliones
- Family: Sclerosomatidae
- Genus: Heterogagrella; Roewer, 1954

Genus of harvestmen/daddy longlegs

Heterogagrella is a genus of harvestmen in the family Sclerosomatidae from Southeast Asia.

== Species ==
- Heterogagrella biseriata S. Suzuki, 1981
- Heterogagrella indica Roewer, 1954
