= Metasyleus =

Scientific classification
- Domain: Eukaryota
- Kingdom: Animalia
- Phylum: Arthropoda
- Subphylum: Chelicerata
- Class: Arachnida
- Order: Opiliones
- Family: Sclerosomatidae
- Genus: Metasyleus; Roewer, 1955

Genus of harvestmen/daddy longlegs

Metasyleus is a genus of harvestmen in the family Sclerosomatidae.

== Species ==
- Metasyleus ephippiatus Roewer, 1955
- Metasyleus orissus Roewer, 1955
- Metasyleus tenuis Roewer, 1955
