= Parageaya =

Scientific classification
- Domain: Eukaryota
- Kingdom: Animalia
- Phylum: Arthropoda
- Subphylum: Chelicerata
- Class: Arachnida
- Order: Opiliones
- Family: Sclerosomatidae
- Genus: Parageaya; Mello-Leitão, 1933

Genus of harvestmen/daddy longlegs

Parageaya is a genus of harvestmen in the family Sclerosomatidae from Latin America.

== Species ==
- Parageaya albifrons C.J.Goodnight & M.L.Goodnight, 1942
- Parageaya bielawskii Starega, 1970
- Parageaya ciliata Mello-Leitão, 1933b
- Parageaya corderoi (Mello-Leitão, 1936)
- Parageaya uruguayensis Ringuelet, 1963
- Parageaya vittatus (Mello-Leitão, 1940)
