= Rongsharia =

Scientific classification
- Domain: Eukaryota
- Kingdom: Animalia
- Phylum: Arthropoda
- Subphylum: Chelicerata
- Class: Arachnida
- Order: Opiliones
- Family: Sclerosomatidae
- Subfamily: Gyinae
- Genus: Rongsharia; Roewer, 1957

Genus of harvestmen

Rongsharia is a genus of harvestmen in the family Sclerosomatidae. There are at least three described species in Rongsharia, found in the Himalayan Region.

== Species ==
These three species belong to the genus Rongsharia:

- Rongsharia dhaulagirica Martens, 1982
- Rongsharia dispersa Martens, 1982
- Rongsharia singularis Roewer, 1957
