= Syleus =

Scientific classification
- Domain: Eukaryota
- Kingdom: Animalia
- Phylum: Arthropoda
- Subphylum: Chelicerata
- Class: Arachnida
- Order: Opiliones
- Family: Sclerosomatidae
- Genus: Syleus; Thorell, 1876

Genus of harvestmen/daddy longlegs

Syleus is a genus of harvestmen in the family Sclerosomatidae from India.

== Species ==
- Syleus mysoreus Roewer, 1955
- Syleus niger (C.L.Koch, 1848)
