= Prodentobunus =

Scientific classification
- Domain: Eukaryota
- Kingdom: Animalia
- Phylum: Arthropoda
- Subphylum: Chelicerata
- Class: Arachnida
- Order: Opiliones
- Family: Sclerosomatidae
- Genus: Prodentobunus; Roewer, 1923

Genus of harvestmen/daddy longlegs

Prodentobunus is a genus of harvestmen in the family Sclerosomatidae from Asia.

== Species ==
- Prodentobunus unispinosus (Roewer, 1912)
- Prodentobunus luteus Suzuki, 1977
- Prodentobunus nitidus Roewer, 1955
- Prodentobunus tao Roewer, 1955
