= Paragagrella =

Scientific classification
- Domain: Eukaryota
- Kingdom: Animalia
- Phylum: Arthropoda
- Subphylum: Chelicerata
- Class: Arachnida
- Order: Opiliones
- Family: Sclerosomatidae
- Genus: Paragagrella; Roewer, 1912

Genus of harvestmen/daddy longlegs

Paragagrella is a genus of harvestmen in the family Sclerosomatidae from South and Southeast Asia.

== Species ==
- Paragagrella basalis Roewer, 1929
- Paragagrella brevispina Banks, 1930
- Paragagrella mysorea Roewer, 1939
- Paragagrella roeweri Giltay, 1930
- Paragagrella typus Roewer, 1912
