= Geaya =

Scientific classification
- Kingdom: Animalia
- Phylum: Arthropoda
- Subphylum: Chelicerata
- Class: Arachnida
- Order: Opiliones
- Family: Sclerosomatidae
- Subfamily: Gagrellinae
- Genus: Geaya; Roewer, 1910

Genus of harvestmen/daddy longlegs

Geaya is a genus of harvestmen in the family Sclerosomatidae from Latin America.

== Species ==
- Geaya aenescens Roewer, 1910
- Geaya areolata Roewer, 1953
- Geaya atrolutea Roewer, 1910
- Geaya atrospinulosa Roewer, 1957
- Geaya aureobrunnea Roewer, 1953
- Geaya aureolucens Roewer, 1953
- Geaya auriscutata Roewer, 1963
- Geaya auroephippiata Roewer, 1956
- Geaya auruginia C.J.Goodnight & M.L.Goodnight, 1942
- Geaya bahiensis Mello-Leitão, 1931
- Geaya belizensis C.J.Goodnight & M.L.Goodnight, 1947
- Geaya benedictina Roewer, 1953
- Geaya bimaculata Caporiacco, 1938
- Geaya bipectinata Roewer, 1953
- Geaya boliviana Roewer, 1953
- Geaya brevipes Roewer, 1915
- Geaya brunea Mello-Leitão, 1941
- Geaya caraca C.J.Goodnight & M.L.Goodnight, 1947
- Geaya centralis Roewer, 1953
- Geaya chamberlini Roewer, 1953
- Geaya corneli Roewer, 1953
- Geaya coxalis Roewer, 1953
- Geaya crucicolorata Roewer, 1953
- Geaya cuprinites Roewer, 1957
- Geaya davisi C.J.Goodnight & M.L.Goodnight, 1942
- Geaya decorata Roewer, 1953
- Geaya elegans Roewer, 1927c
- Geaya ephippiata Roewer, 1915
- Geaya esperanza C.J.Goodnight & M.L.Goodnight, 1942
- Geaya exlineae Roewer, 1953
- Geaya fasciata Roewer, 1953
- Geaya femoralis Roewer, 1953
- Geaya funerea Caporiacco, 1951
- Geaya gertschi Roewer, 1953
- Geaya goodnighti Roewer, 1953
- Geaya grandis Roewer, 1953
- Geaya haitiensis C.J.Goodnight & M.L.Goodnight, 1943
- Geaya ibarrana Roewer, 1953
- Geaya illudens Mello-Leitão, 1947
- Geaya insularis Roewer, 1953
- Geaya jamaicana Roewer, 1953
- Geaya lineata C.J.Goodnight & M.L.Goodnight, 1953
- Geaya maculatipes Roewer, 1916
- Geaya magna Roewer, 1953
- Geaya marginata Roewer, 1953
- Geaya mediana Roewer, 1953
- Geaya monticola
- Geaya nigricoxa Roewer, 1910
- Geaya nigriventis Mello-Leitão, 1942
- Geaya nigromaculata Roewer, 1910
- Geaya nigrosigillata Mello-Leitão, 1947
- Geaya opaca Roewer, 1953
- Geaya ortizi Roewer, 1957
- Geaya parallela Roewer, 1953
- Geaya plana C.J.Goodnight & M.L.Goodnight, 1942
- Geaya plaumanni Roewer, 1953
- Geaya pulchra Roewer, 1953
- Geaya punctulata Roewer, 1953
- Geaya quadrimaculata Roewer, 1953
- Geaya recifea Roewer, 1953
- Geaya reimoseri Roewer, 1933
- Geaya sandersoni C.J.Goodnight & M.L.Goodnight, 1947
- Geaya scrobiculata Roewer, 1953
- Geaya speciosa Roewer, 1953
- Geaya splendens Roewer, 1953
- Geaya striata Roewer, 1953
- Geaya tampicona Roewer, 1953
- Geaya tezonapa C.J.Goodnight & M.L.Goodnight, 1947
- Geaya thoracica Roewer, 1953
- Geaya tibialis Roewer, 1953
- Geaya unicolor Roewer, 1910
- Geaya ventralis Roewer, 1953
- Geaya viridinitens Roewer, 1953
- Geaya vivida C.J.Goodnight & M.L.Goodnight, 1942
- Geaya vogli C.J.Goodnight & M.L.Goodnight, 1947
- Geaya wenzeli C.J.Goodnight & M.L.Goodnight, 1947
- Geaya werneri Roewer, 1953
- Geaya yucatana C.J.Goodnight & M.L.Goodnight, 1947
