= Azucarella =

Scientific classification
- Domain: Eukaryota
- Kingdom: Animalia
- Phylum: Arthropoda
- Subphylum: Chelicerata
- Class: Arachnida
- Order: Opiliones
- Family: Sclerosomatidae
- Genus: Azucarella; Roewer, 1959
- Species: A. weyrauchi

Binomial name
- Azucarella weyrauchi Roewer, 1959

Genus of harvestmen/daddy longlegs

Azucarella weyrauchi is a species of harvestmen in a monotypic genus in the family Sclerosomatidae.
