= Xerogrella =

Scientific classification
- Domain: Eukaryota
- Kingdom: Animalia
- Phylum: Arthropoda
- Subphylum: Chelicerata
- Class: Arachnida
- Order: Opiliones
- Family: Sclerosomatidae
- Genus: Xerogrella; J. Martens, 1987
- Species: X. dolpensis

Binomial name
- Xerogrella dolpensis J. Martens, 1987

Genus of harvestmen/daddy longlegs

Xerogrella dolpensis is a species of harvestmen in a monotypic genus in the family Sclerosomatidae from Nepal.
