= Gyoides =

Scientific classification
- Domain: Eukaryota
- Kingdom: Animalia
- Phylum: Arthropoda
- Subphylum: Chelicerata
- Class: Arachnida
- Order: Opiliones
- Family: Sclerosomatidae
- Subfamily: Gyinae
- Genus: Gyoides; Martens, 1982

Genus of harvestmen

Gyoides is a genus of harvestmen in the family Sclerosomatidae. There are about seven described species in Gyoides, found in the Himalayan Region.

== Species ==
These seven species belong to the genus Gyoides:

- Gyoides gandaki Martens, 1982
- Gyoides geometricus Martens, 1982
- Gyoides himaldispersus Martens, 1982
- Gyoides maximus Martens, 1982
- Gyoides mirus (Roewer, 1957)
- Gyoides rivorum Martens, 1982
- Gyoides tibiouncinatus Martens, 1982
