= Zaleptulus =

Scientific classification
- Domain: Eukaryota
- Kingdom: Animalia
- Phylum: Arthropoda
- Subphylum: Chelicerata
- Class: Arachnida
- Order: Opiliones
- Family: Sclerosomatidae
- Genus: Zaleptulus; Roewer, 1955

Genus of harvestmen/daddy longlegs

Zaleptulus is a genus of harvestmen in the family Sclerosomatidae.

== Species ==
- Zaleptulus banksi Roewer, 1955
- Zaleptulus lineatus Roewer, 1955
- Zaleptulus unicolor Roewer, 1955
