= Gagrellenna =

Scientific classification
- Kingdom: Animalia
- Phylum: Arthropoda
- Subphylum: Chelicerata
- Class: Arachnida
- Order: Opiliones
- Family: Sclerosomatidae
- Subfamily: Gagrellinae
- Genus: Gagrellenna; Roewer, 1929
- Species: G. bipunctata

Binomial name
- Gagrellenna bipunctata Roewer, 1929

Genus of harvestmen/daddy longlegs

Gagrellenna bipunctata is a species of harvestmen in a monotypic genus in the family Sclerosomatidae from India.
