= Goasheer =

Scientific classification
- Domain: Eukaryota
- Kingdom: Animalia
- Phylum: Arthropoda
- Subphylum: Chelicerata
- Class: Arachnida
- Order: Opiliones
- Family: Sclerosomatidae
- Subfamily: Leiobuninae
- Genus: Goasheer; Snegovaya, Cokendolpher & Mozaffarian, 2018
- Species: G. iranus

Binomial name
- Goasheer iranus (Roewer, 1952)

Synonyms
- Homolophus iranum Roewer, 1952; Microliobunum iranum (Roewer, 1952)

Genus of harvestmen

Goasheer is a genus of harvestmen in the family Sclerosomatidae. This genus has a single species, Goasheer iranus.
