= Dilophiocara =

Scientific classification
- Domain: Eukaryota
- Kingdom: Animalia
- Phylum: Arthropoda
- Subphylum: Chelicerata
- Class: Arachnida
- Order: Opiliones
- Family: Sclerosomatidae
- Subfamily: Leiobuninae
- Genus: Dilophiocara; Redikortsev, 1931

Genus of harvestmen

Dilophiocara is a genus of harvestmen in the family Sclerosomatidae. There are at least two described species in Dilophiocara.

== Species ==
These two species belong to the genus Dilophiocara:

- Dilophiocara afghanum (Roewer, 1960) (Afghanistan)
- Dilophiocara bactrianum Redikortsev, 1931 (Tajikistan, Uzbekistan, Kyrgyzstan)
