= Verpulus =

Scientific classification
- Domain: Eukaryota
- Kingdom: Animalia
- Phylum: Arthropoda
- Subphylum: Chelicerata
- Class: Arachnida
- Order: Opiliones
- Family: Sclerosomatidae
- Genus: Verpulus; Simon, 1901

Genus of harvestmen/daddy longlegs

Verpulus is a genus of harvestmen in the family Sclerosomatidae from South and Southeast Asia.

== Species ==
- Verpulus brunneus Roewer, 1955
- Verpulus curvitarsus (Suzuki, 1977)
- Verpulus gracilis Roewer, 1955
- Verpulus gravelyi (Roewer, 1929)
- Verpulus kanoi Suzuki, 1967
- Verpulus laevipes Roewer, 1955
- Verpulus magnus Roewer, 1955
- Verpulus marginatus Roewer, 1912
- Verpulus monticola (Roewer, 1955)
- Verpulus peguensis Roewer, 1955
- Verpulus promeus (Roewer, 1955)
- Verpulus ramosus (Suzuki, 1977)
- Verpulus spumatus Simon, 1901
