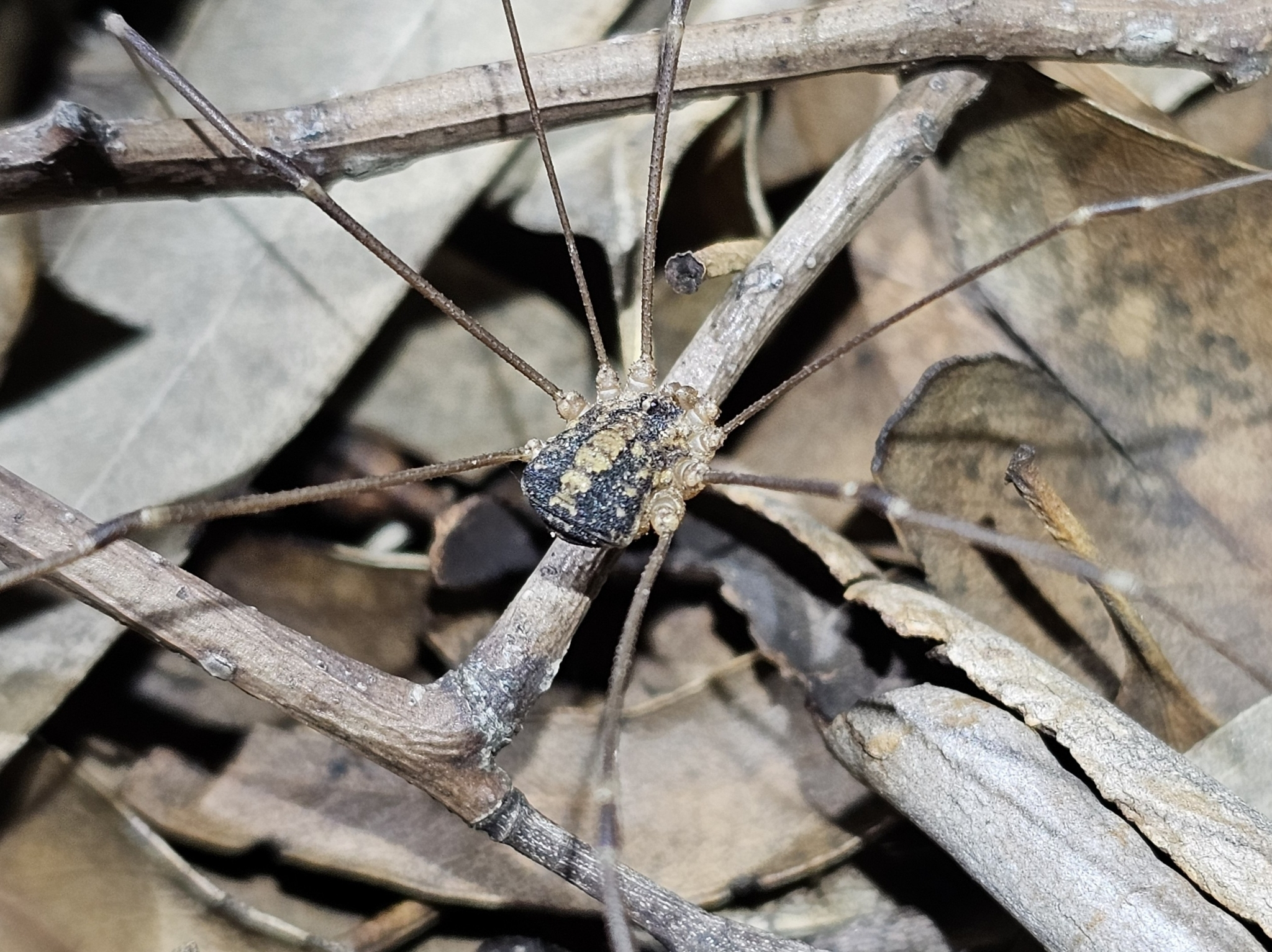
- Cosmobunus granarius, Spain

Scientific classification
- Domain: Eukaryota
- Kingdom: Animalia
- Phylum: Arthropoda
- Subphylum: Chelicerata
- Class: Arachnida
- Order: Opiliones
- Family: Sclerosomatidae
- Subfamily: Leiobuninae
- Genus: Cosmobunus; Simon, 1879

= Cosmobunus =

Genus of harvestmen

Cosmobunus is a genus of harvestmen in the family Sclerosomatidae. There are about five described species in Cosmobunus, including one extinct species.

== Species ==
These five species belong to the genus Cosmobunus:

- Cosmobunus americanus Roewer, 1957 (Guatemala)
- Cosmobunus auratus Goodnight & Goodnight, 1946 (Mexico)
- Cosmobunus granarius (Lucas, 1846) (Iberian Peninsula and North Africa)
- Cosmobunus unicolor Roewer, 1910 (Spain)
- † Cosmobunus sagani Palencia, Peñalver, Prieto & Poyato-Ariza, 2019
