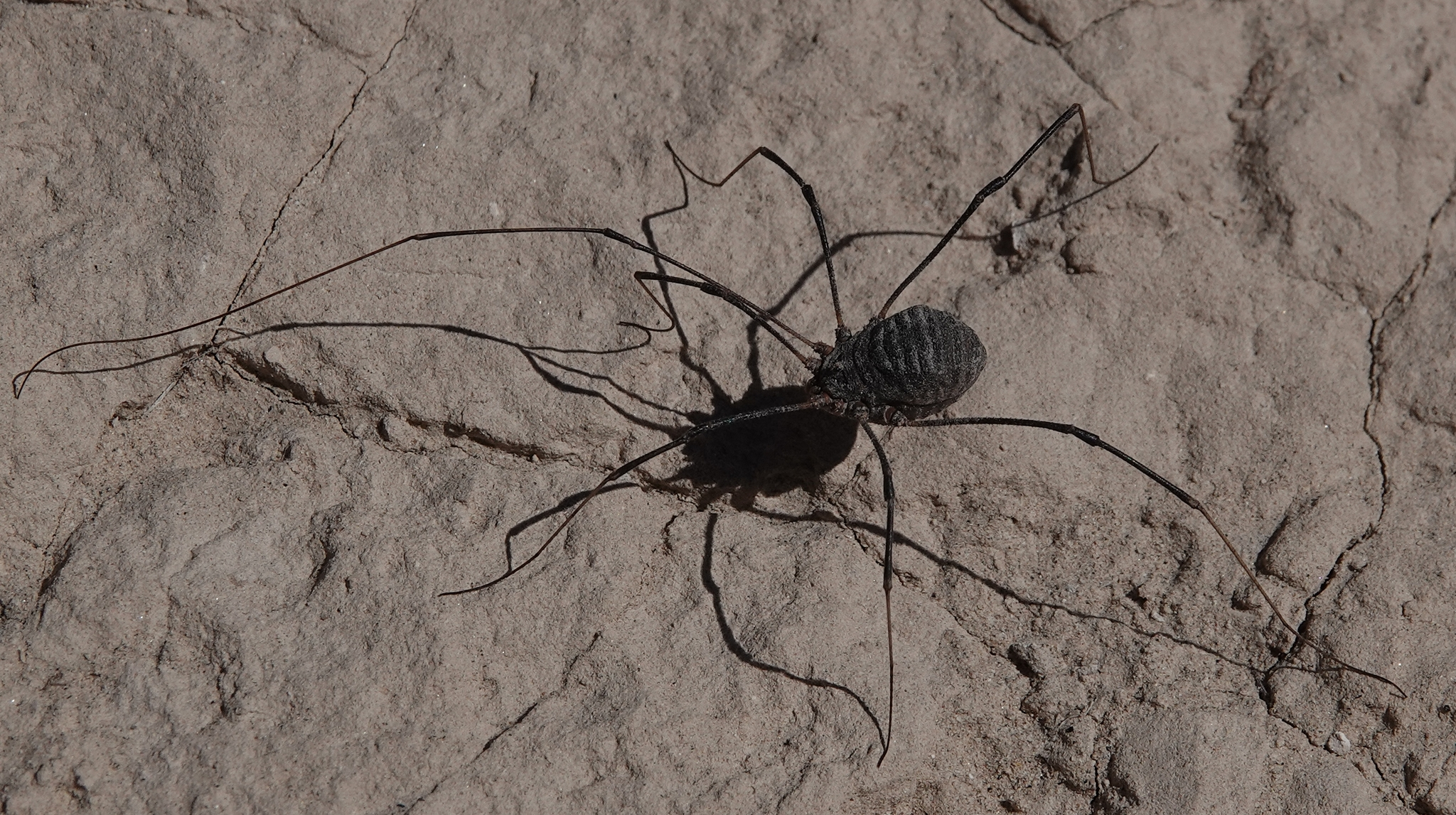
- Trachyrhinus favosus

Scientific classification
- Domain: Eukaryota
- Kingdom: Animalia
- Phylum: Arthropoda
- Subphylum: Chelicerata
- Class: Arachnida
- Order: Opiliones
- Family: Sclerosomatidae
- Subfamily: Gagrellinae
- Genus: Trachyrhinus; Weed, 1892

= Trachyrhinus =

Genus of harvestmen/daddy longlegs

Trachyrhinus is a genus of harvestmen in the family Sclerosomatidae found in North America.

== Species ==
- Trachyrhinus dicropalpus J. C. Cokendolpher, 1981
- Trachyrhinus favosus (Wood, 1871)
- Trachyrhinus horneri J. C. Cokendolpher, 1981
- Trachyrhinus marmoratus Banks, 1894
- Trachyrhinus mesillensis J. C. Cokendolpher, 1981
- Trachyrhinus rectipalpus J. C. Cokendolpher, 1981
- Trachyrhinus sonoranus Chamberlin, 1925
