= Himalzaleptus =

Scientific classification
- Domain: Eukaryota
- Kingdom: Animalia
- Phylum: Arthropoda
- Subphylum: Chelicerata
- Class: Arachnida
- Order: Opiliones
- Family: Sclerosomatidae
- Genus: Himalzaleptus; J. Martens, 1987
- Species: H. quinqueconicus

Binomial name
- Himalzaleptus quinqueconicus J. Martens, 1987

Genus of harvestmen/daddy longlegs

Himalzaleptus quinqueconicus is a species of harvestmen in a monotypic genus in the family Sclerosomatidae from Nepal.
