= Zaleptiolus =

Scientific classification
- Domain: Eukaryota
- Kingdom: Animalia
- Phylum: Arthropoda
- Subphylum: Chelicerata
- Class: Arachnida
- Order: Opiliones
- Family: Sclerosomatidae
- Genus: Zaleptiolus; Roewer, 1955

Genus of harvestmen/daddy longlegs

Zaleptiolus is a genus of harvestmen in the family Sclerosomatidae from Asia.

== Species ==
- Zaleptiolus ater J. Martens, 1987
- Zaleptiolus aureolus Suzuki, 1970
- Zaleptiolus implicatus Suzuki, 1970
- Zaleptiolus laevipes Roewer, 1955
