= Systenocentrus =

Scientific classification
- Domain: Eukaryota
- Kingdom: Animalia
- Phylum: Arthropoda
- Subphylum: Chelicerata
- Class: Arachnida
- Order: Opiliones
- Family: Sclerosomatidae
- Genus: Systenocentrus; Simon, 1886

Genus of harvestmen/daddy longlegs

Systenocentrus is a genus of harvestmen in the family Sclerosomatidae from Southeast and East Asia.

== Species ==
- Systenocentrus confucianus Hirst, 1911
- Systenocentrus galeatus (Thorell, 1889)
- Systenocentrus japonicus Hirst, 1911
- Systenocentrus luteobiseriatus S. Suzuki, 1982
- Systenocentrus quinquedentatus Simon, 1886
- Systenocentrus rufus Roewer, 1955
