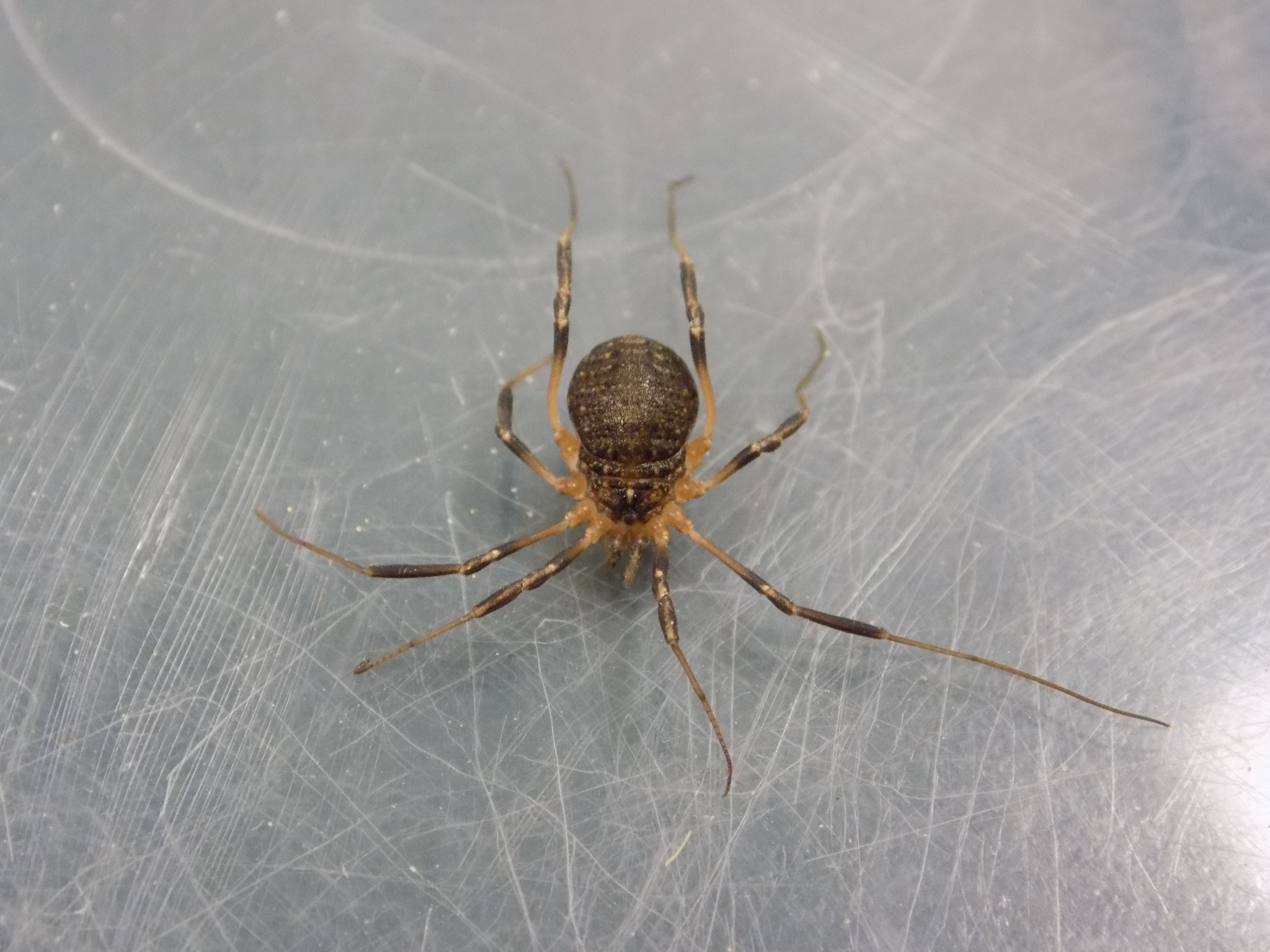
- Eumesosoma roeweri

Scientific classification
- Domain: Eukaryota
- Kingdom: Animalia
- Phylum: Arthropoda
- Subphylum: Chelicerata
- Class: Arachnida
- Order: Opiliones
- Family: Sclerosomatidae
- Genus: Eumesosoma; Cokendolpher, 1980

= Eumesosoma =

Genus of harvestmen/daddy longlegs

Eumesosoma is a genus of harvestmen in the family Sclerosomatidae, found in the United States.

== Species ==
These species are members of the genus Eumesosoma :

- Eumesosoma arnetti Cokendolpher, 1980 (Texas)
- Eumesosoma ephippiatum (Roewer, 1923) (Illinois)
- Eumesosoma nigrum (Say, 1821) (South Carolina)
- Eumesosoma ocalense Cokendolpher, 1980 (Florida)
- Eumesosoma roeweri (Goodnight & Goodnight, 1943) (Central United States)
- Eumesosoma sayi Cokendolpher, 1980 (Florida)
- † Eumesosoma abdelmawlai Elsaka, Mitov & Dunlop, 2019
