= Hologagrella =

Scientific classification
- Domain: Eukaryota
- Kingdom: Animalia
- Phylum: Arthropoda
- Subphylum: Chelicerata
- Class: Arachnida
- Order: Opiliones
- Family: Sclerosomatidae
- Genus: Hologagrella; Roewer, 1910

Genus of harvestmen/daddy longlegs

Hologagrella is a genus of harvestmen in the family Sclerosomatidae from Southeast Asia.

== Species ==
- Hologagrella curvicornis Roewer, 1913
- Hologagrella curvispina Banks, 1930
- Hologagrella luzonica Roewer, 1910
- Hologagrella minatoi Suzuki, 1974
- Hologagrella normalis Banks, 1930
- Hologagrella reticulata Roewer, 1910
- Hologagrella timorana Roewer, 1955
