= Himaldroma =

Scientific classification
- Domain: Eukaryota
- Kingdom: Animalia
- Phylum: Arthropoda
- Subphylum: Chelicerata
- Class: Arachnida
- Order: Opiliones
- Family: Sclerosomatidae
- Subfamily: Gagrellinae
- Genus: Himaldroma; Martens, 1987

Genus of harvestmen

Himaldroma is a genus of harvestmen in the family Sclerosomatidae. There are at least two described species in Himaldroma, found in the Himalaya region.

== Species ==
These two species belong to the genus Himaldroma:

- Himaldroma alta Martens, 1987 (Nepal)
- Himaldroma pineti Martens, 1987 (Nepal)
