= Caluga =

Scientific classification
- Domain: Eukaryota
- Kingdom: Animalia
- Phylum: Arthropoda
- Subphylum: Chelicerata
- Class: Arachnida
- Order: Opiliones
- Family: Sclerosomatidae
- Genus: Caluga; Roewer, 1959
- Species: C. rupicola

Binomial name
- Caluga rupicola Roewer, 1959

Genus of harvestmen/daddy longlegs

Caluga rupicola is a species of harvestmen in a monotypic genus in the family Sclerosomatidae.
