= Pseudarthromerus =

Scientific classification
- Domain: Eukaryota
- Kingdom: Animalia
- Phylum: Arthropoda
- Subphylum: Chelicerata
- Class: Arachnida
- Order: Opiliones
- Family: Sclerosomatidae
- Genus: Pseudarthromerus; Karsch, 1892
- Species: P. spurius

Binomial name
- Pseudarthromerus spurius Karsch, 1892

Genus of harvestmen/daddy longlegs

Pseudarthromerus spurius is a species of harvestmen in a monotypic genus in the family Sclerosomatidae.
