= Pseudoarthromerus =

Scientific classification
- Domain: Eukaryota
- Kingdom: Animalia
- Phylum: Arthropoda
- Subphylum: Chelicerata
- Class: Arachnida
- Order: Opiliones
- Family: Sclerosomatidae
- Genus: Pseudoarthromerus; Karsch, 1891
- Species: P. spurius

Binomial name
- Pseudoarthromerus spurius Karsch, 1891

Genus of harvestmen/daddy longlegs

Pseudoarthromerus spurius is a species of harvestmen in a monotypic genus in the family Sclerosomatidae from Japan.
