= Sinadroma =

Scientific classification
- Domain: Eukaryota
- Kingdom: Animalia
- Phylum: Arthropoda
- Subphylum: Chelicerata
- Class: Arachnida
- Order: Opiliones
- Family: Sclerosomatidae
- Genus: Sinadroma; Roewer, 1955
- Species: S. sherriffsi

Binomial name
- Sinadroma sherriffsi Roewer, 1955

Genus of harvestmen/daddy longlegs

Sinadroma sherriffsi is a species of harvestmen in a monotypic genus in the family Sclerosomatidae.
