= Pectenobunus =

Scientific classification
- Domain: Eukaryota
- Kingdom: Animalia
- Phylum: Arthropoda
- Subphylum: Chelicerata
- Class: Arachnida
- Order: Opiliones
- Family: Sclerosomatidae
- Genus: Pectenobunus; Roewer, 1910

Genus of harvestmen/daddy longlegs

Pectenobunus is a genus of harvestmen in the family Sclerosomatidae from South America.

== Species ==
- Pectenobunus paraguayensis (Canestrini, 1888)
- Pectenobunus ruricola (Mello-Leiteo, 1933)
