= Schenkeliobunum =

Scientific classification
- Kingdom: Animalia
- Phylum: Arthropoda
- Subphylum: Chelicerata
- Class: Arachnida
- Order: Opiliones
- Family: Sclerosomatidae
- Subfamily: Leiobuninae
- Genus: Schenkeliobunum; Staręga, 1964
- Species: S. tuberculatum

Binomial name
- Schenkeliobunum tuberculatum (Schenkel, 1963)

Synonyms
- Thrasychiroides Schenkel, 1963

Genus of harvestmen

Schenkeliobunum is a genus of harvestmen in the family Sclerosomatidae. This genus has a single species, Schenkeliobunum tuberculatum, found in China.

Note, a second species Schenkeliobunum wuxi Lu, Wang & Zhang, 2022: 76 is currently placed in the genus so is not monotypic. Else, some databases give the epithet of the type species as "tuberculatus" but as Schenkeliobunum is neuter the correct inflection is tuberculatum
