= Bonthainia =

Scientific classification
- Domain: Eukaryota
- Kingdom: Animalia
- Phylum: Arthropoda
- Subphylum: Chelicerata
- Class: Arachnida
- Order: Opiliones
- Family: Sclerosomatidae
- Genus: Bonthainia; Roewer, 1913

Genus of harvestmen/daddy longlegs

Bonthainia is a genus of harvestmen in the family Sclerosomatidae from South and Southeast Asia.

== Species ==
- Bonthainia aenescens Roewer, 1913
- Bonthainia annulata Suzuki, 1977
- Bonthainia celebensis (Roewer, 1955)
- Bonthainia elegans (Roewer, 1931)
- Bonthainia gravelyi (Roewer, 1929)
