= Pseudastrobunus =

Scientific classification
- Domain: Eukaryota
- Kingdom: Animalia
- Phylum: Arthropoda
- Subphylum: Chelicerata
- Class: Arachnida
- Order: Opiliones
- Family: Sclerosomatidae
- Genus: Pseudastrobunus; Martens, 1973
- Species: P. perpusillus

Binomial name
- Pseudastrobunus perpusillus Martens, 1973

Genus of harvestmen

Pseudastrobunus is a genus of harvestmen in the family Sclerosomatidae. This genus has a single species, Pseudastrobunus perpusillus, found in the Himalayan region.
