= 2016 Summer Olympics torch relay =

- Host city: Rio de Janeiro, Brazil
- Countries visited: Greece, Switzerland, Brazil
- Distance: 20,000 kilometres (12,000 mi)
- Torchbearers: 12,000
- Start date: 21 April 2016
- End date: 5 August 2016

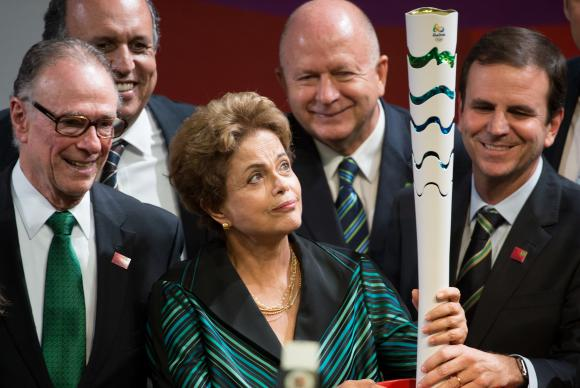
President Dilma Rousseff holding the Olympic torch, accompanied by the president of BOC Carlos Arthur Nuzman (left), IOC Member Bernard Rajzman (center), and the Mayor of Rio de Janeiro, Eduardo Paes (right).

The 2016 Summer Olympics torch relay which ran from 21 April until 5 August 2016. After being lit in Olympia, Greece, the torch traveled to Athens on the 27 April. The Brazilian leg began in the capital, Brasília, and ended in Rio de Janeiro's Maracanã Stadium, the main venue of the 2016 Olympics. After having visited more than 300 Brazilian cities, including all 26 state capitals and the Federal District. The end of the relay was the closing to the 2016 Summer Olympics opening ceremony.

== Route in Greece ==

21 April
1. Olympia
2. Pyrgos
3. Amaliada
4. Lechaina
22 April
5. Zakynthos
6. Patras
7. Rio–Antirrio bridge
8. Missolonghi
9. Astakos
10. Lefkada
11. Nicopolis
12. Preveza
23 April
13. Igoumenitsa
14. Corfu
15. Ioannina
16. Veria
24 April
17. Thessaloniki
18. Serres
19. Drama
20. Kavala
25 April
21. Alexandroupoli
22. Komotini
23. Xanthi
24. Katerini
26 April
25. Larissa
26. Chalcis
27. Marathon
26–28 April
28. Athens

== Route in Switzerland ==

29 April
1. Lausanne
30 April
2. Geneva

== Route in Brazil ==
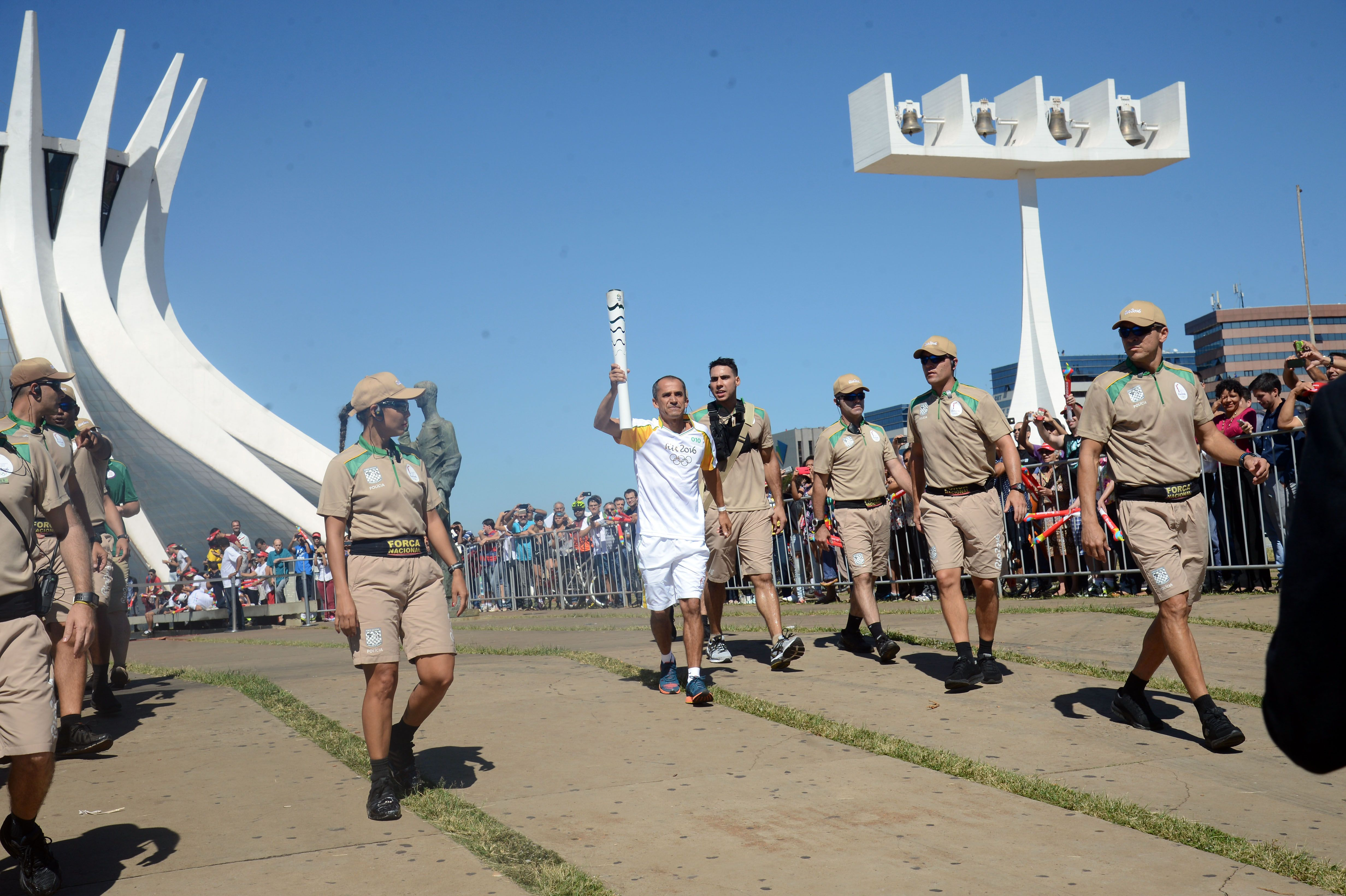
Torch relay in Brasília, with the marathoner Vanderlei Cordeiro de Lima (3 May).

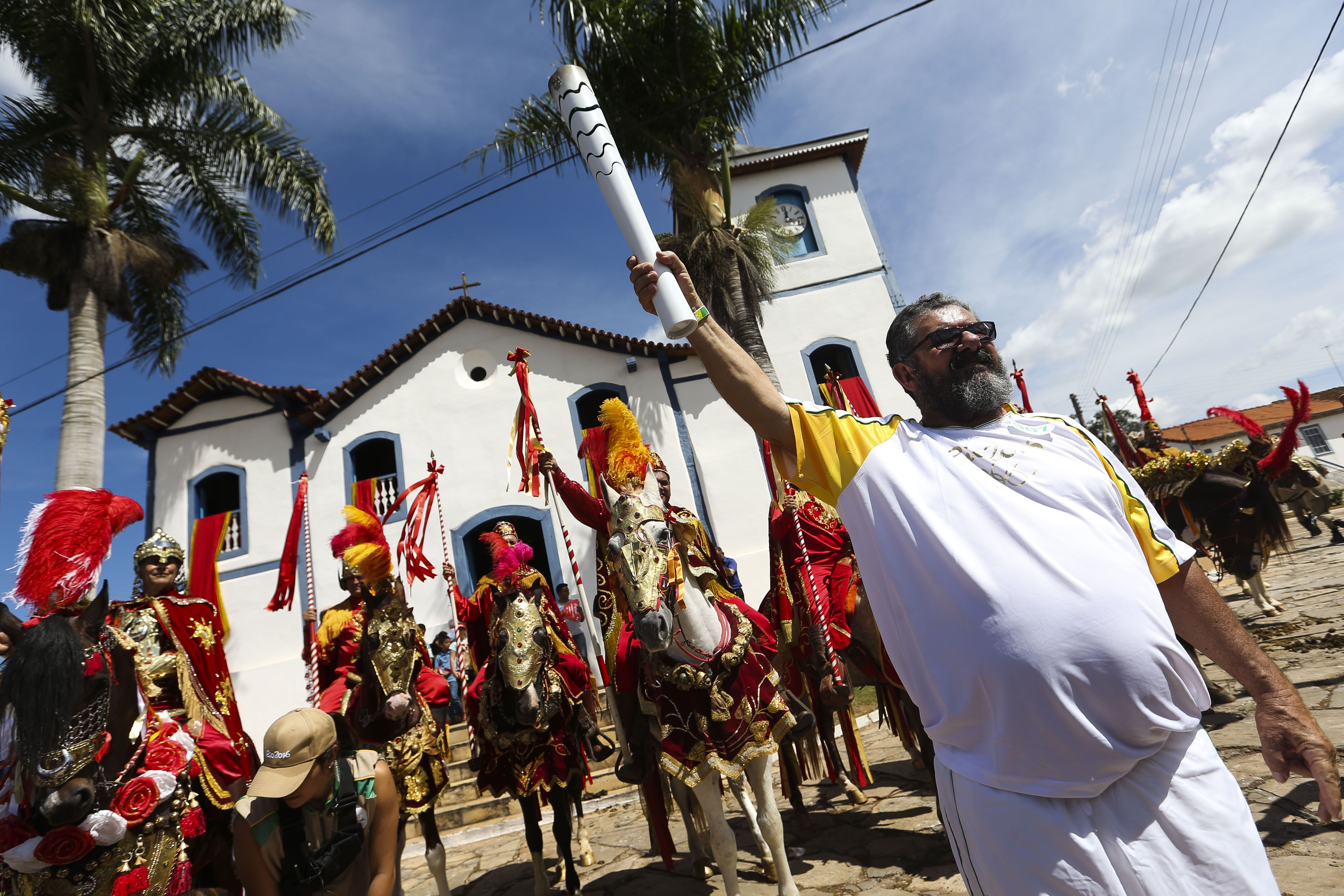
Torch relay in Corumbá de Goiás (4 May).

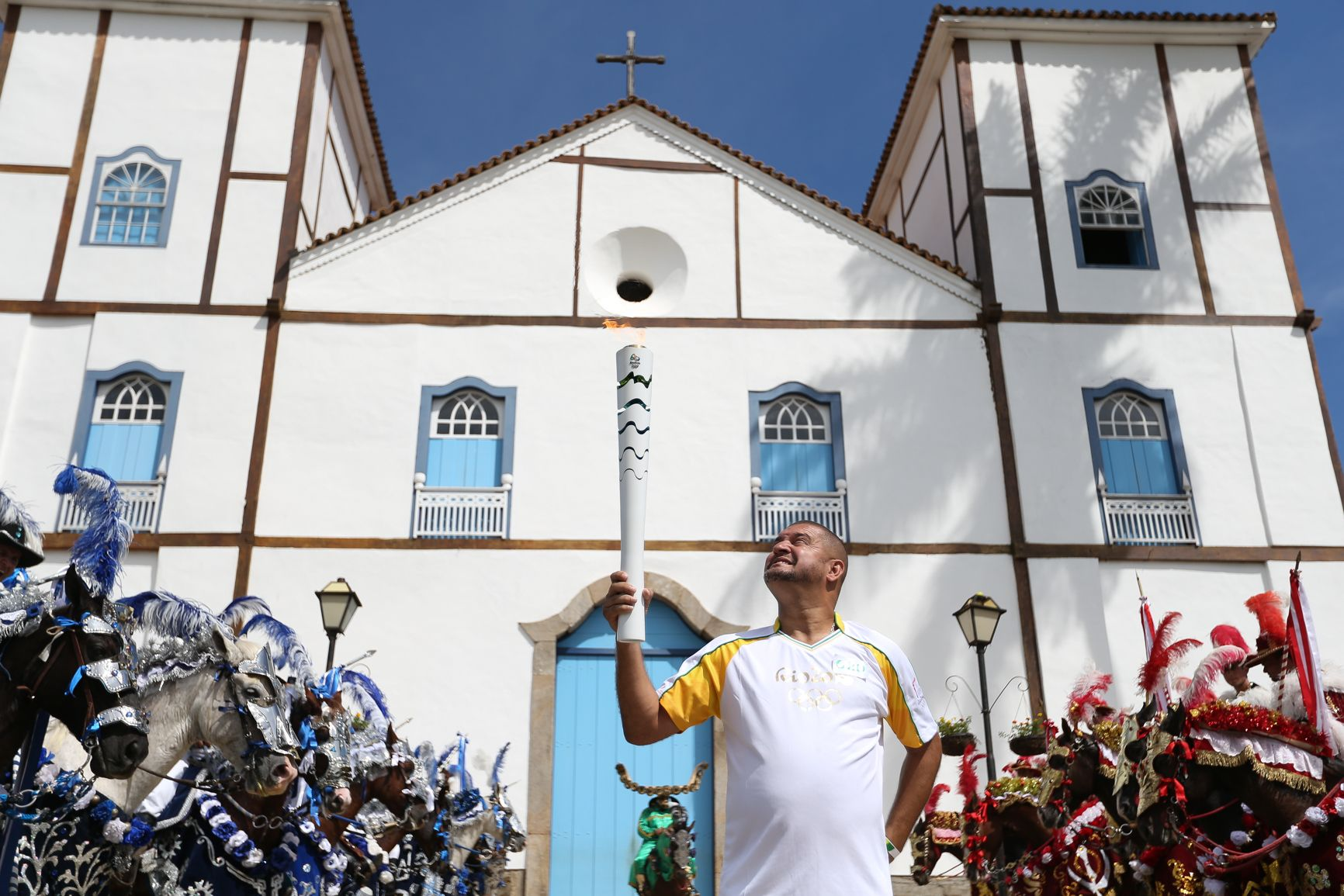
Torch relay in Pirenópolis, Goiás (4 May).

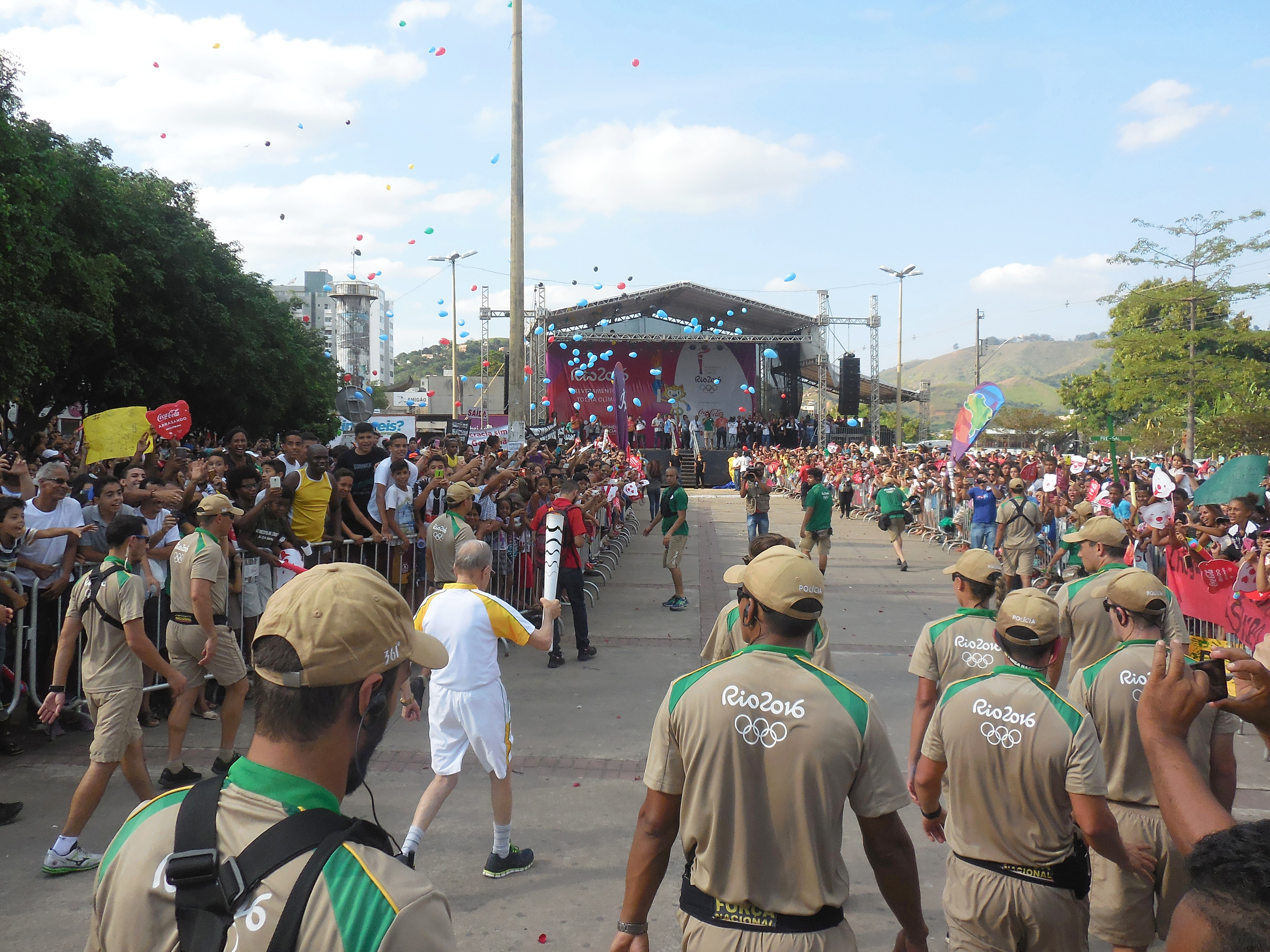
Torch relay in Coronel Fabriciano, Minas Gerais, with Don Lélis Lara (12 May).

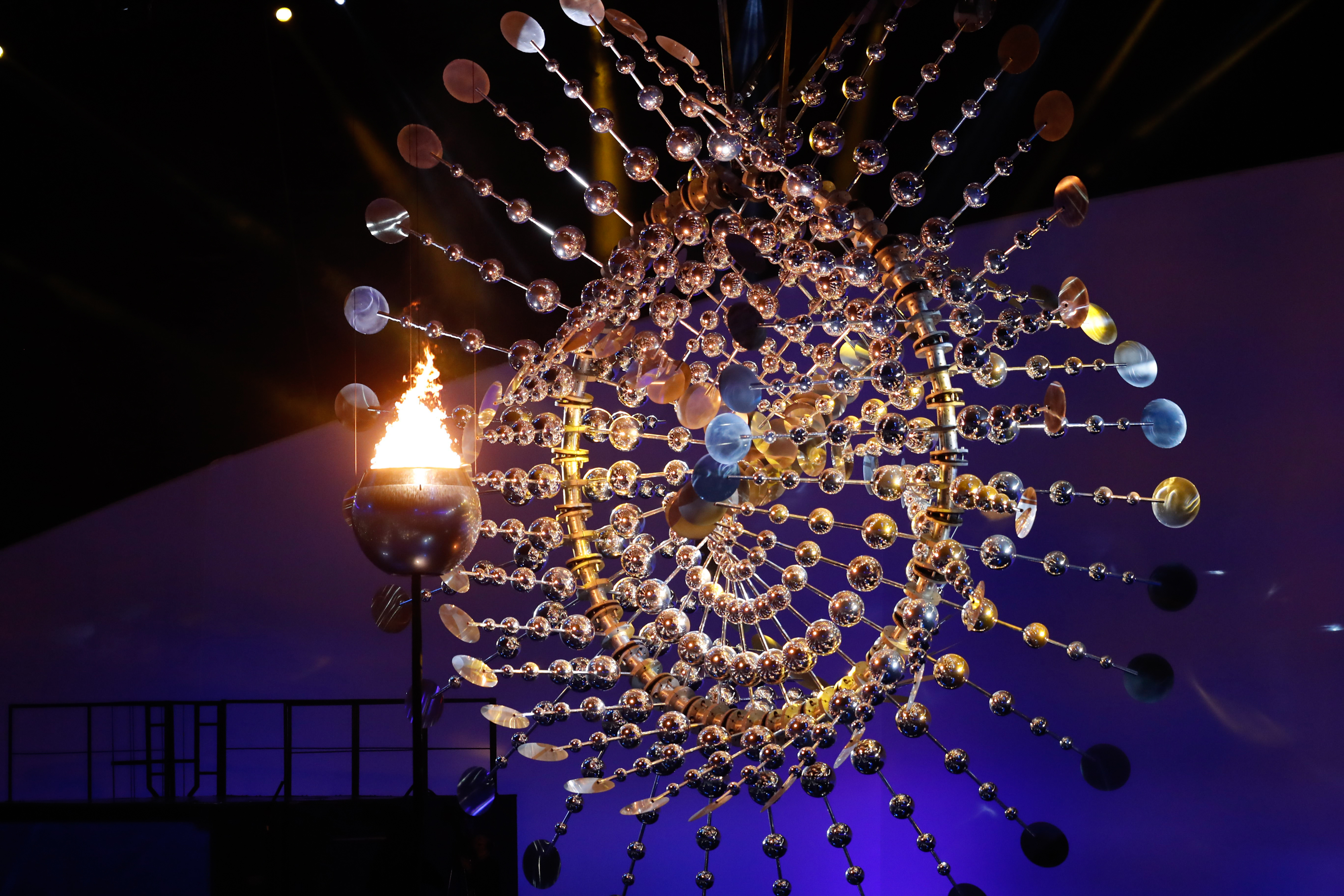
The last stop of the torch relay, Maracanã Stadium in Rio de Janeiro (5 August).

3 May
1. Brasília
4 May
2. Corumbá de Goiás
3. Pirenópolis
4. Anápolis
5 May
5. Itaberaí
6. Goiás
7. Inhumas
8. Goiânia
6 May
9. Trindade
10. Aparecida de Goiânia
11. Piracanjuba
12. Morrinhos
13. Caldas Novas
7 May
14. Pires do Rio
15. Ipameri
16. Goiandira
17. Araguari
18. Uberlândia
8 May
19. Uberaba
20. Araxá
21. Serra do Salitre
22. Patrocínio
23. Patos de Minas
9 May
24. Varjão de Minas
25. Pirapora
26. Montes Claros
10 May
27. Bocaiúva
28. Couto de Magalhães de Minas
29. Diamantina
30. Curvelo
11 May
31. Datas
32. Serro
33. Guanhães
34. Governador Valadares
12 May
35. Naque
36. Coronel Fabriciano
37. Itabira
13 May
38. Ouro Preto
39. Itabirito
40. Brumadinho
14 May
41. Contagem
42. Belo Horizonte
15 May
43. São João del-Rei
44. Tiradentes
45. Barbacena
46. Juiz de Fora
16 May
47. Bicas
48. Leopoldina
49. Muriaé
50. Itaperuna
51. Bom Jesus do Itabapoana
52. Cachoeiro de Itapemirim
17 May
53. Guarapari
54. Vila Velha
55. Vitoria
18 May
56. Serra
57. Aracruz
58. Colatina
59. Linhares
60. São Mateus
19 May
61. Teixeira de Freitas
62. Itamaraju
63. Santa Cruz Cabrália
64. Porto Seguro
20 May
65. Eunápolis
66. Itapetinga
67. Vitoria da Conquista
21 May
68. Itambé, Bahia
69. Floresta Azul
70. Ibicaraí
71. Itabuna
72. Ilhéus
22 May
73. Cairu (Morro de São Paulo)
74. Itacaré
75. Camamu
76. Ituberá
77. Valença
23 May
78. Lençóis
24 May
79. Salvador
25 May
80. Feira de Santana
81. Riachão do Jacuípe
82. Capim Grosso
83. Senhor do Bonfim
26 May
84. Jaguarari
85. Juazeiro
86. Sobradinho
87. Petrolina
27 May
88. Lagoa Grande
89. Santa Maria da Boa Vista
90. Orocó
91. Cabrobó
92. Paulo Afonso
28 May
93. Canindé de São Francisco
94. Poco Redondo
95. Nossa Senhora da Gloria
96. Nossa Senhora das Dores
97. Aracaju
29 May
98. Propriá
99. São Sebastião
100. Arapiraca
101. São Miguel dos Campos
102. Maceió
30 May
103. Murici
104. União dos Palmares
105. Garanhuns
106. Lajedo
107. Caruaru
31 May
108. Gravatá
109. Jaboatão dos Guararapes
110. Recife
1 June
111. Ipojuca
2 June
112. Igarassu
113. Pedras de Fogo
114. Itabaiana
115. Campina Grande
3 June
116. Guarabira
117. Sape
118. João Pessoa
4 June
119. Mamanguape
120. São José de Mipibu
121. Parnamirim
122. Natal
5 June
123. Fernando de Noronha
6 June
124. Lajes
125. Angicos
126. Assú
127. Mossoró
7 June
128. Aracati
129. Aquiraz
130. Fortaleza
8 June
131. Caucaia
132. Itapajé
133. Forquilha
134. Sobral
9 June
135. Massapê
136. Granja
137. Camocim
138. Barroquinha
139. Parnaíba
10 June
140. Piracuruca
141. Piripiri
142. Campo Maior
143. Altos
144. Teresina
11 June
145. Palmas
12 June
146. São Luís
13 June
147. Barreirinhas
14 June
148. Imperatriz
15 June
149. Belém
16 June
150. Macapá
17 June
151. Santarém
18 June
152. Boa Vista
19–20 June
153. Manaus
20 June
154. Iranduba
155. Presidente Figueiredo
21 June
156. Rio Branco
22 June
157. Porto Velho
23 June
158. Várzea Grande
159. Cuiabá
24 June
160. Pantanal
25 June
161. Campo Grande
26 June
162. Sidrolândia
163. Rio Brilhante
164. Maracaju
165. Itaporã
166. Dourados
27 June
167. Nova Andradina
168. Bataguassu
169. Presidente Prudente
28 June
170. Paraguaçu Paulista
171. Marília
172. Assis
173. Londrina
29 June
174. Arapongas
175. Maringá
176. Campo Mourão
177. Cascavel
30 June
178. Matelândia
179. Medianeira
180. São Miguel do Iguaçu
181. Santa Terezinha de Itaipu
182. Foz do Iguaçu
1 July
183. Foz do Iguaçu
2 July
184. Céu Azul
185. Santa Tereza do Oeste
186. Realeza
187. Francisco Beltrão
188. Pato Branco
3 July
189. São Lourenço do Oeste
190. Chapecó
191. Concórdia
192. Erechim
193. Passo Fundo
4 July
194. São Miguel das Missões
195. Santo Ângelo
196. Ijuí
197. Cruz Alta
5 July
198. Encantado
199. Lajeado
200. Santa Cruz do Sul
201. Santa Maria
6 July
202. São Sepé
203. Caçapava do Sul
204. Canguçu
205. Rio Grande
206. Pelotas
7 July
207. São Lourenço do Sul
208. Camaquã
209. Guaíba
210. Porto Alegre
8 July
211. Canoas
212. Esteio
213. Novo Hamburgo
214. Granado
215. Canela
216. Nova Petrópolis
217. Caxias do Sul
9 July
218. Bento Gonçalves
219. Torres
220. Sombrio
221. Araranguá
222. Criciúma
10 July
223. Tubarão
224. Torres
225. Laguna
226. São José
10–11 July
227. Florianópolis
12 July
228. Biguaçu
229. Balneário Camboriú
230. Itajaí
231. Ilhota
232. Gaspar
233. Blumenau
13 July
234. Massaranduba
235. Jaraguá do Sul
236. São Francisco do Sul
237. Joinville
14 July
238. São José dos Pinhais
239. Curitiba
15 July
240. Fazenda Rio Grande
241. Araucária
242. Campo Largo
243. Ponta Grossa
16 July
244. Castro
245. Itararé
246. Itapeva
247. Capão Bonito
248. Itapetininga
July 17
249. Sorocaba
250. Tatuí
251. Botucatu
252. Lençóis Paulista
253. Bauru
18 July
254. Jaú
255. Araraquara
256. São Carlos
257. Ribeirão Preto
19 July
258. Sertãozinho
259. Jaboticabal
260. Bebedouro
261. Barretos
262. Franca
20 July
263. Rio Claro
264. Limeira
265. Americana
266. Campinas
21 July
267. Indaiatuba
268. Itu
269. Jundiaí
270. Osasco
22 July
271. Praia Grande
272. São Vicente
273. Santos
274. Guarujá
23 July
275. Guarulhos
276. São Caetano do Sul
277. Santo André
278. São Bernardo do Campo
24 July
279. São Paulo City
25 July
280. Ilhabela
26 July
281. Suzano
282. Mogi das Cruzes
283. Jacareí
284. São Jose dos Campos
27 July
285. Taubaté
286. São Luiz do Paraitinga
287. Ubatuba
288. Paraty
289. Angra Dos Reis
28 July
290. Ilha Grande
291. Rio Claro
292. Resende
293. Barra Mansa
294. Volta Redonda
29 July
295. Pirai
296. Barra do Pirai
297. Vassouras
298. Paraíba do Sul
299. Três Rios
300. Petrópolis
30 July
301. Teresópolis
302. Guapimirim
303. Cachoeiras de Macacu
304. Nova Friburgo
31 July
305. Cordeiro
306. Itaocara
307. São Fidélis
308. Campos dos Goytacazes
309. Macaé
1 August
310. Rio das Ostras
311. Armação dos Búzios
312. São Pedro da Aldeia
313. Iguaba Grande
314. Araruama
315. Arraial do Cabo
316. Cabo Frio
2 August
317. Saquarema
318. Rio Bonito
319. Tanguá
320. Itaboraí
321. São Gonçalo
322. Niterói
3 August
323. Centro
324. Duque de Caxias
325. São João de Meriti
326. Nilópolis
327. Belford Roxo
328. Nova Iguaçu
4 August
329. Barra da Tijuca
330. Campo Grande
331. Bangu
332. Madureira
333. Copacabana
5 August
334. Cristo Redentor
335. Botafogo
336. Pão de Açúcar
337. Aterro do Flamengo
338. Maracanã Stadium

== End of Torch Relay ==
At the 2016 Summer Olympics opening ceremony, Gustavo Kuerten brought the Olympic torch into the stadium, relayed off the Olympic flame to Hortência Marcari, who relayed to Vanderlei de Lima. de Lima then lit the Olympic cauldron.

== Torch bearers ==
Notable torch bearers include:

- Vanderlei de Lima: de Lima had been selected as the final torch bearer and the one who lit the cauldron after Pelé declined due to illness. de Lima had been attacked during his marathon run at the 2004 Olympics, when he was leading, making him a leading choice for the honor of last flame bearer.
- Hortência Marcari: Marcari is considered the greatest Brazilian female basketball player.
- Gustavo Kuerten: Kuerten is the best male tennis player in South America in history.
- Ban Ki-moon, Ban is the Secretary-General of the United Nations
- Thomas Bach, Bach is the President of the International Olympic Committee
- Carlos Arthur Nuzman, Nuzman is the President of the Rio 2016 Summer Olympics Organizing Committee
- Adriana Lima, Lima is a Brazilian supermodel.
- Eduardo Paes, Paes is the mayor of Rio de Janeiro
- Heloísa Pinheiro, Pinheiro was the source of inspiration for the bossa nova single The Girl from Ipanema.
- Pio: Osmar Alberto Volpe is a Brazilian footballer who played for various clubs throughout the 1970s. He was especially known for his career with Palmeiras.
