= Santa Tereza =

Santa Tereza may refer to various location in Brazil:

- Santa Tereza, Rio Grande do Sul, municipality
- Santa Tereza, Ceará, district
- Santa Tereza, Porto Alegre (bairro) in the city of Porto Alegre
- Santa Tereza do Tocantins municipality in the state of Tocantins in the Northern region of Brazil
- Santa Tereza do Oeste a municipality in the state of Paraná in the Southern Region of Brazil
- Santa Tereza de Goiás town and municipality in north Goiás state, Brazil
- Santa Tereza River

See also

- Santa Teresa
