= Itajaí =

Municipality in Southern Brazil

- Municipality
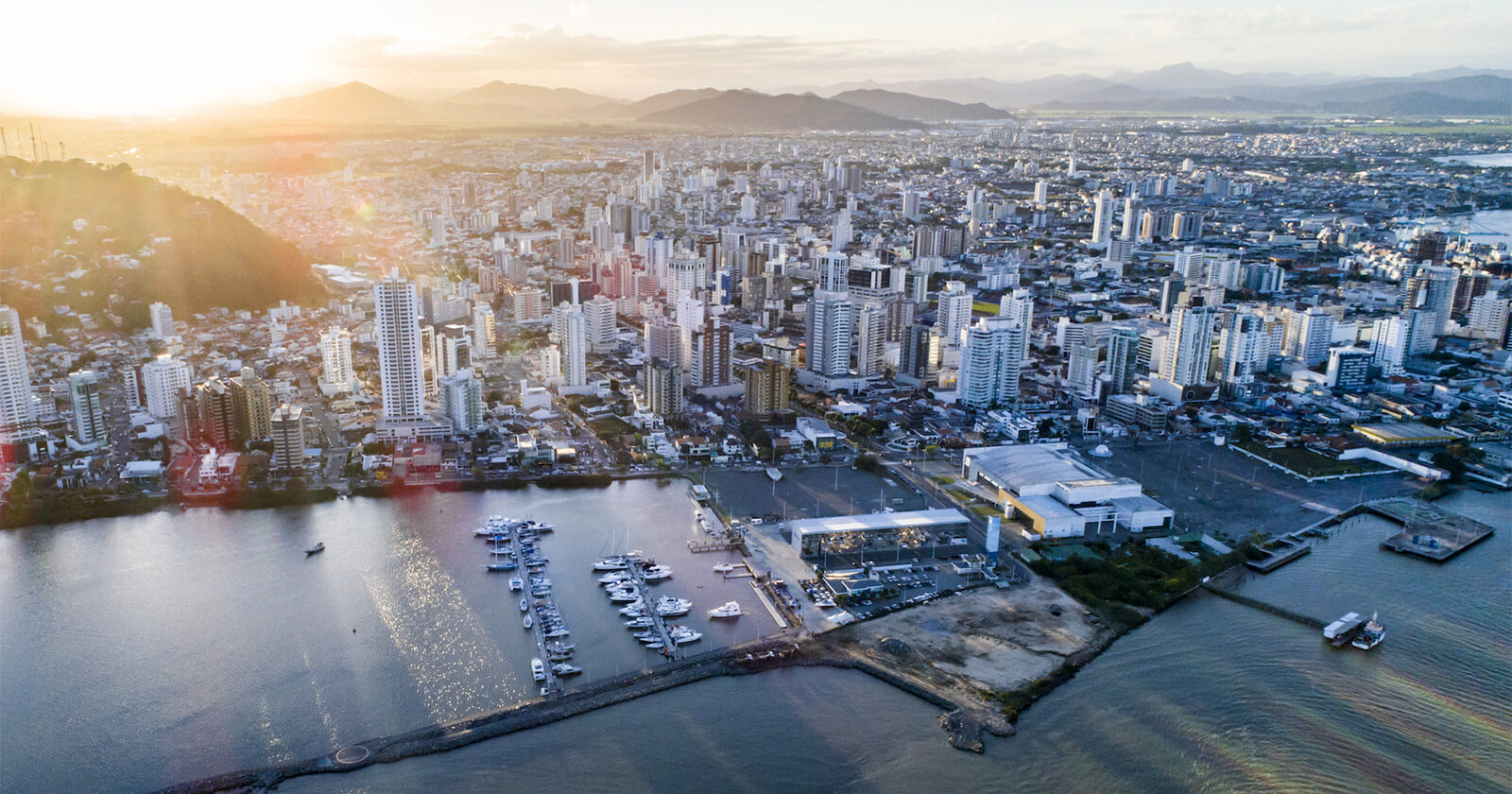
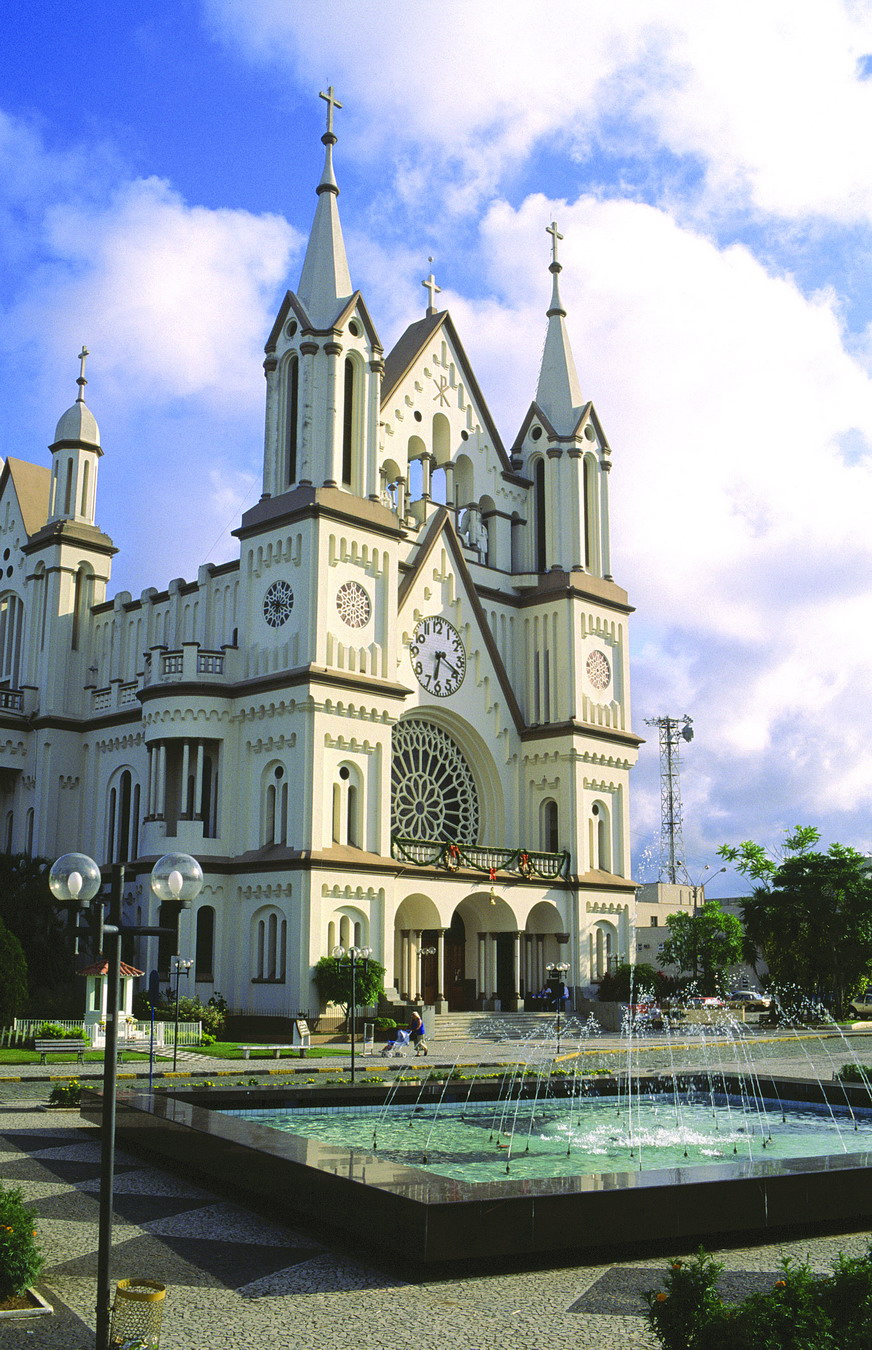
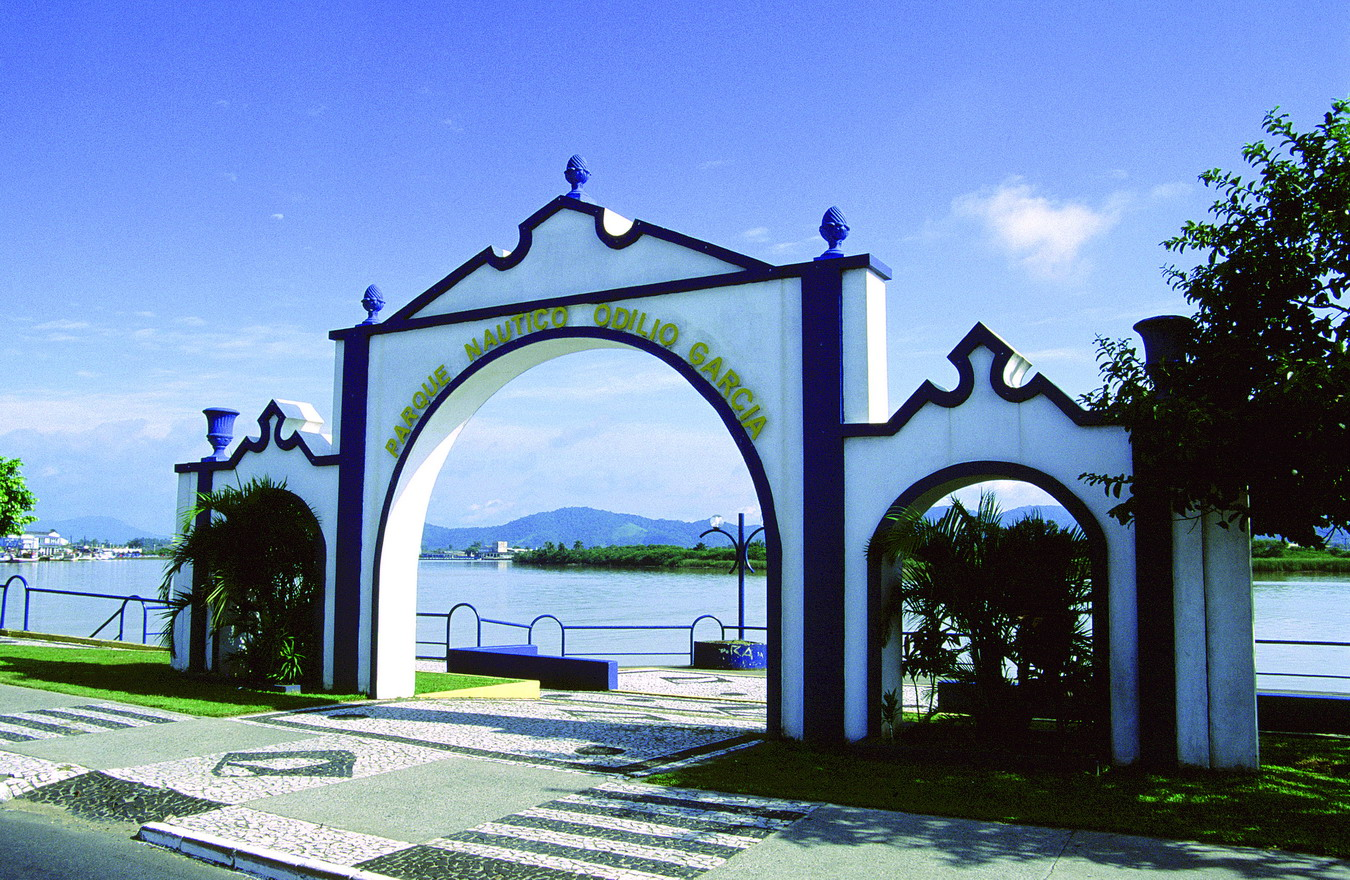
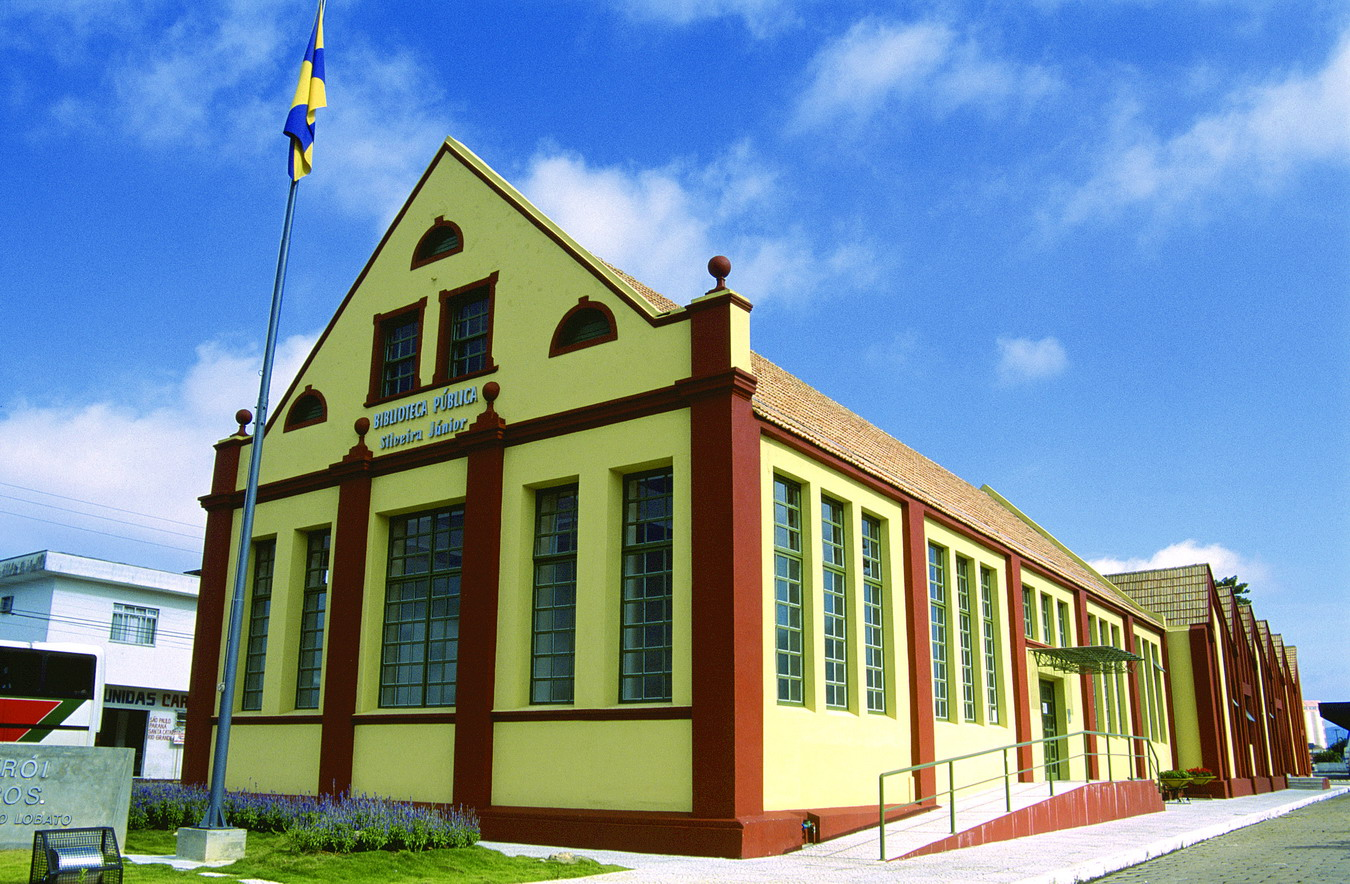
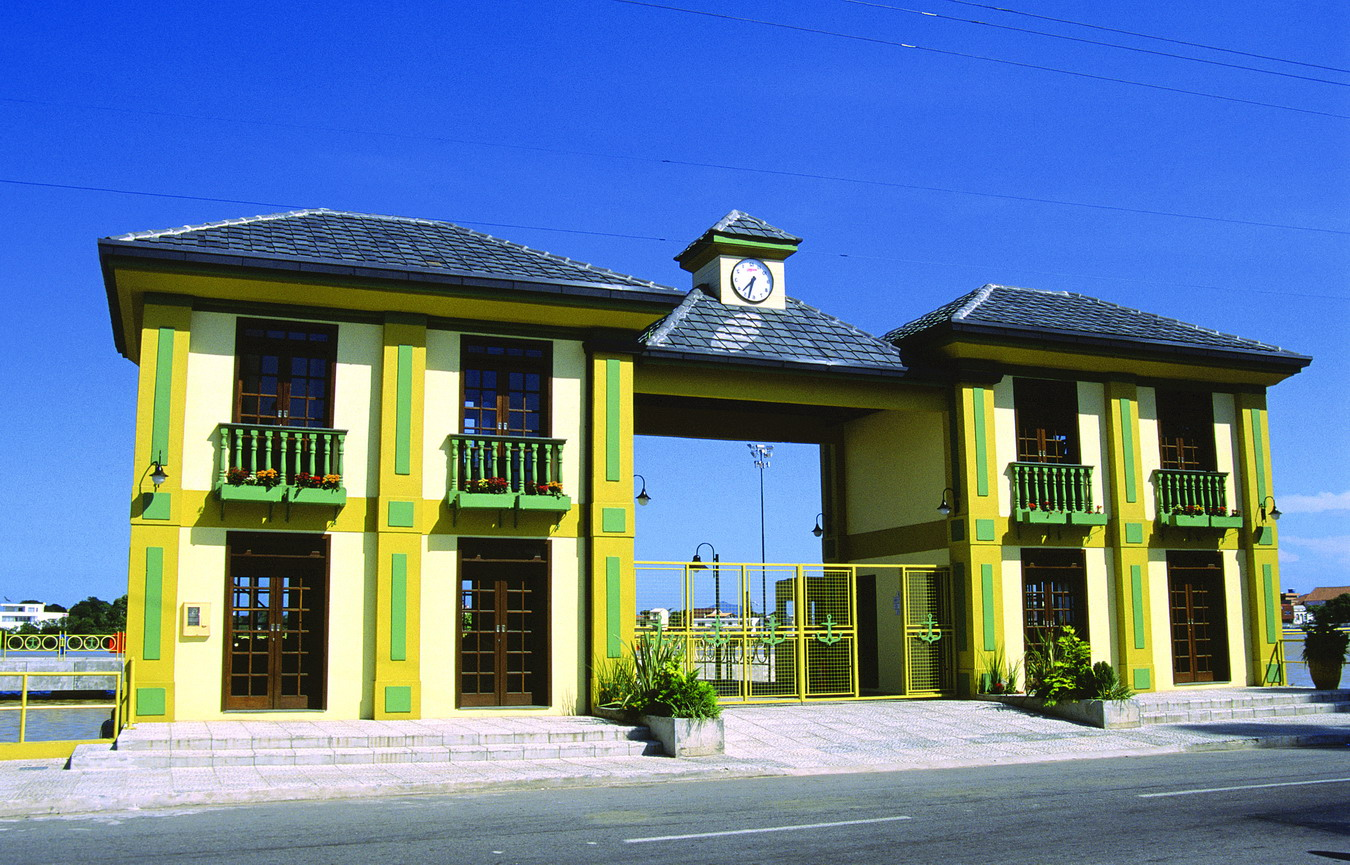

- Flag Coat of arms
- Motto: "Quality of Life"
- Location in the state of Santa Catarina

- Location in Brazil
- Coordinates: 26°54′S 48°40′W
- Country: Brazil
- Region: Southern
- State: Santa Catarina
- Founded: June 15, 1860

Government
  - Mayor: Robison José Coelho (PL)

Area
  - Total: 289.285 km^{2} (111.694 sq mi)
- Elevation: 2 m (6.6 ft)

Population (2022)
  - Total: 264,054
  - Estimate (2025): 294,850
  - Density: 912.782/km^{2} (2,364.09/sq mi)
- Time zone: UTC−3 (BRT)
- HDI (2010): 0.795 – high
- Website: www.itajai.sc.gov.br

Itajaí (Portuguese pronunciation: [itaʒaˈi]) is a municipality in the state of Santa Catarina, Brazil. It is located on the northern central coast of Santa Catarina and is part of the Vale do Itajaí Mesoregion, on the right bank of the Itajaí-Açu river mouth. It lies at the mouth of the Itajaí River, at 20 feet (6 metres) above sea level. The city has the 2nd largest gross domestic product and the highest per capita income in the State of Santa Catarina.

== History ==
The city was founded on June 15, 1860, but the colonization of Itajaí had started in 1658 when the Paulista João Dias D'Arzão arrived in the region. In 1750, Portuguese colonists coming from Madeira and the Azores made this region their home. By 1823 it became a prominent region for Portuguese settlers and, at the end of the 19th century, received a great number of German immigrants.

Itajaí and most of Santa Catarina State area is prone to torrential storms specially during the Spring season. Floods are frequent and even tornadoes can form.

In late November 2008, around 100 people perished in floods due to the long lasting showers that fell in Southeastern and Southern Brazil. 90% of the city was underwater and the port was partially destroyed. Many lost their homes and other possessions and had no ready shelters to turn to, for the rain combined with river waters invaded every section of the city and most of Central and Coastal Santa Catarina State. President Lula da Silva and other officials flew over the area to evaluate the damage and offer help. The state was declared a disaster area by the State and Federal governments.

== Demography ==
The majority of the population is descended from Germans, Italians and Azoreans. The mixture of German, Italian and Portuguese cultures is a landmark of the city.

Race	Percentage
White	69.6%
Pardo (Multiracial)	23.6%
Black	6.4%
Asian	0.3%
Indigenous	0.1%

Source: 2022 census

It is estimated that of the little more than 200 thousand inhabitants of the city, about 190 thousand live in the urban area and 10 thousand in the rural area. According to the IBGE census, the population is approximately 51% female and 49% male.

=== Religion ===
The predominant religions in the municipality are the Roman Catholic (approximately 61% of the population) and Evangelical (approximately 28% of the population). There are also practitioners of other religions, such as spiritist, umbanda, candomblé and Buddhism, but with less representation.

== Geography ==
It occupies an area of 304 km², 20% urban and 80% rural (or conservation areas).

It is located on the north coast of the Santa Catarina State, specifically at the mouth of the Itajaí-Açu river. It borders onto the cities of Balneário Camboriú, Camboriú, Brusque, Gaspar, Ilhota and Navegantes. It has the headquarters of the largest fishing port in the country and the largest university in the state, the Univali (Universidade do Vale do Itajaí).

Itajaí is located in the Lower Valley of Rio Itajaí, the coast and the Atlantic Ocean. It is situated at the mouth of the Itajaí-Açu river, allowing the existence of the port.

The city is basically flat - due to being at sea level The highest point is Morro da Cruz, 170 meters above sea level. It was part of the defunct metropolitan area of Foz do Rio Itajaí, together with the neighboring municipalities.

Itajaí hosts one of the biggest festivals of Brazilian popular music. The festival is held every October and brings together musicians and artists from around the country. These meetings are a display of the culture of Itajaí.

The BR-101 is the main link to the city, and highways SC-100, BR-486, SC-470 and BR-470, Itajaí link to the rest of the state.

=== Climate ===
Itajaí has a humid subtropical climate (Köppen climate classification: Cfa) humid in winter and dry in summer. In summer temperatures can reach 40 °C (Temperature reached in 2000) and during the winter they can get as low as 5 °C. It is very rare to get temperatures outside this range. There are reports that the lowest temperature ever recorded in Itajaí was -1 °C in 1975.

Climate data for Itajaí (1976–2005 normals, extremes 2010–Present)
Month	Jan	Feb	Mar	Apr	May	Jun	Jul	Aug	Sep	Oct	Nov	Dec	Year
Record high °C (°F)	38.9 (102.0)	37.5 (99.5)	35.0 (95.0)	33.8 (92.8)	31.2 (88.2)	30.2 (86.4)	29.3 (84.7)	33.6 (92.5)	31.4 (88.5)	34.9 (94.8)	34.0 (93.2)	39.0 (102.2)	39.0 (102.2)
Mean daily maximum °C (°F)	29.4 (84.9)	29.8 (85.6)	28.8 (83.8)	26.9 (80.4)	24.3 (75.7)	21.9 (71.4)	21.3 (70.3)	22.1 (71.8)	22.6 (72.7)	24.5 (76.1)	26.6 (79.9)	28.6 (83.5)	25.6 (78.1)
Daily mean °C (°F)	24.6 (76.3)	24.6 (76.3)	23.6 (74.5)	21.4 (70.5)	18.3 (64.9)	15.8 (60.4)	15.3 (59.5)	16.2 (61.2)	17.6 (63.7)	19.9 (67.8)	21.9 (71.4)	23.7 (74.7)	20.2 (68.4)
Mean daily minimum °C (°F)	20.9 (69.6)	21.1 (70.0)	20.0 (68.0)	18.0 (64.4)	14.8 (58.6)	12.5 (54.5)	11.9 (53.4)	12.7 (54.9)	14.4 (57.9)	16.5 (61.7)	18.1 (64.6)	19.6 (67.3)	16.7 (62.1)
Record low °C (°F)	15.6 (60.1)	14.1 (57.4)	11.2 (52.2)	8.7 (47.7)	6.1 (43.0)	2.1 (35.8)	1.3 (34.3)	4.0 (39.2)	7.4 (45.3)	10.3 (50.5)	12.5 (54.5)	12.4 (54.3)	1.3 (34.3)
Average precipitation mm (inches)	184.1 (7.25)	206.6 (8.13)	190.6 (7.50)	115.7 (4.56)	126.1 (4.96)	85.5 (3.37)	108.9 (4.29)	99.9 (3.93)	131.0 (5.16)	144.3 (5.68)	149.3 (5.88)	140.1 (5.52)	1,682.1 (66.22)
Average relative humidity (%)	84	85	85	86	87	88	88	87	86	84	82	82	85
Mean monthly sunshine hours	178	157	171	157	159	138	143	135	109	127	155	178	1,807
Source 1: Empresa Brasileira de Pesquisa Agropecuária (EMBRAPA)
Source 2: Instituto Nacional de Meteorologia

== Economy ==
=== International trade ===
As of 2014, the municipality of Itajaí conducted 1.61% of Brazil's total export trade with $3.91B (USD) worth of goods. This figure places Itajaí as the 8th highest exporter in Brazil. Of this, 86% or $3.35B (USD) was made up by the trade of animal products. The top five material goods exported by Itajaí for that year were poultry meat (52%), pork (21%), other prepared meat (9.6%), preserved meat (7.3%), and frozen bovine meat (2.2%).

== Port of Itajaí ==
The Port of Itajaí is the main port of Santa Catarina, and the third largest in Brazil in terms of the movement of containers. It serves as the main port for exports in the region, and almost all production of the state of Santa Catarina moves through it at some point.

The Port of Itajaí has an unusual hurdle, in that the Steamboat Pallas was sunk there in 1893, during the Brazilian Naval Revolts, while supplying meat to the protesters. The ship, rediscovered in 2017 under layers of mud under the sea, prevents the expansion of the port and the entry of bigger ships. It is expected to be removed until 2030, alongside other improvements of the port.

In 2025, the Brazilian Federal government announced the creation of a state-owned company to administrate the port of Itajaí, previously controlled by the city. In 2025, the port was temporarily administrated by the same company who administrates the Port of Santos, and in January 2026 this temporary administration was transferred to Companhia das Docas do Estado da Bahia (Codeba), which administrates the Port of Salvador.

== Tourism ==
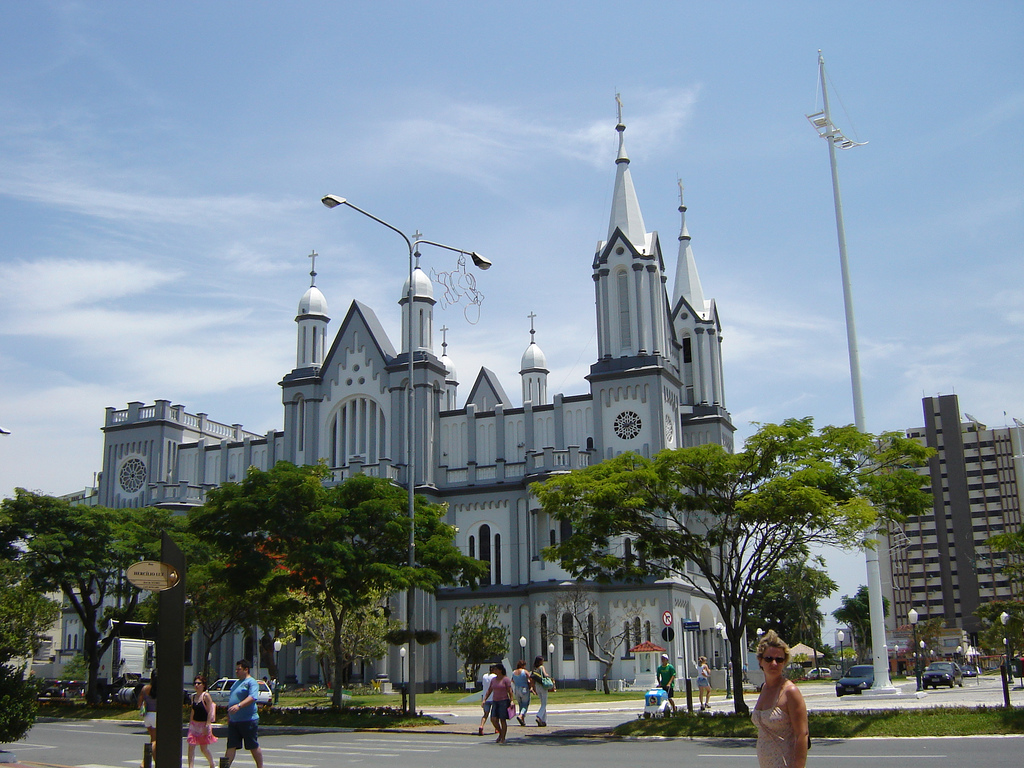
Center of Itajaí

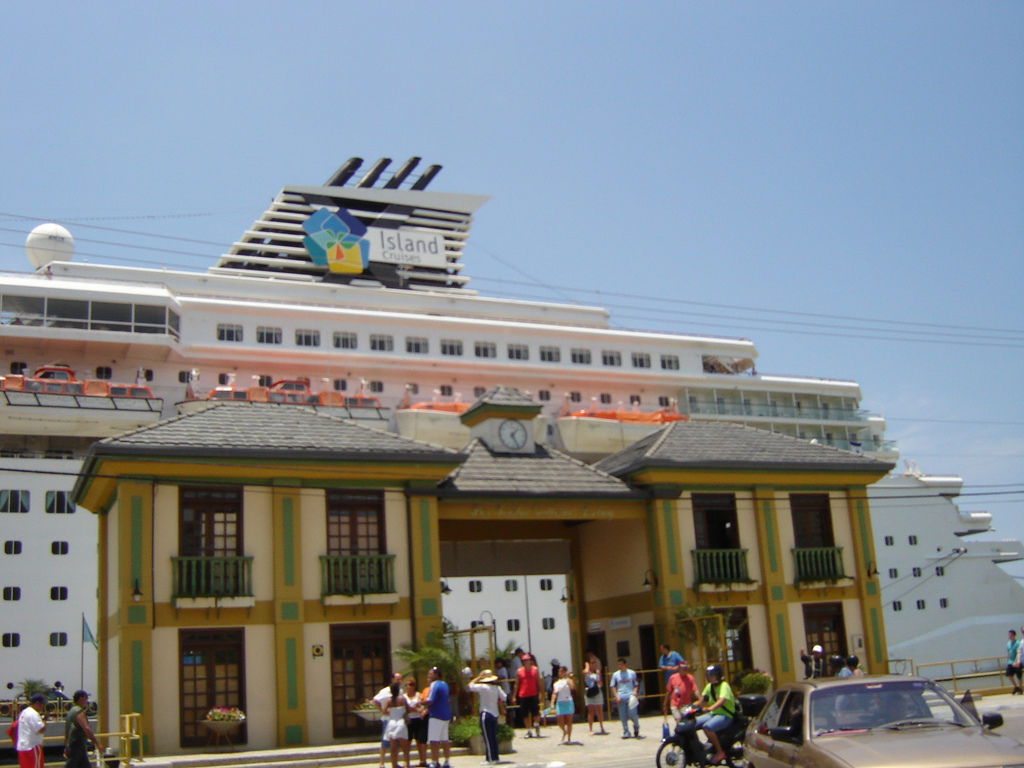
Entrance of Port of Itajaí

Itajaí has many beaches, among them are the Molhes, Atalaia, Jeremias, Cabeçudas, Morcego, Brava (Angry) Beach and Solidão.

One well-known tourist attraction is the Parrot's Beak, a 6-meter-tall rock in the shape of a parrot. The city also has extensive rural areas and natural scenery, with a rich heritage of Azorean Portuguese and German immigrants. Itajaí has a píer for passenger vessels, serving the coast of Santa Catarina and used by the customs, which guides ships in by laser. The Marejada, a Portuguese festival of fishing and seafood, is the principal festival of the city, showcasing attractions relative to the ocean and the Azores. Itajaí is also the hub of Nautical Club Marcílio Dias, a sport association for both football (soccer) and competitive rowing.

In 2013 it has been chosen as the arrival point of the Transat Jacques Vabre and it was a stopover for the Volvo Ocean Race in 2012, 2015 and 2018.

The city is served by Ministro Victor Konder International Airport located in the adjoining municipality of Navegantes.

Each October, people yearly celebrate Marejada, carried out in Itajaí since 1987. It also has the yearly Itajaí boat show from July 2nd to July 5th.

== Twin towns – sister cities ==
Itajaí is twinned with:

- Melipilla, Melipilla Province, Chile
- Pompano Beach, Florida, United States
- Sodegaura, Chiba, Japan
- Viana do Castelo, North Region, Portugal
- Xinxiang, Henan, China
