= AJ Albuquerque =

Brazilian politician (born 1983)

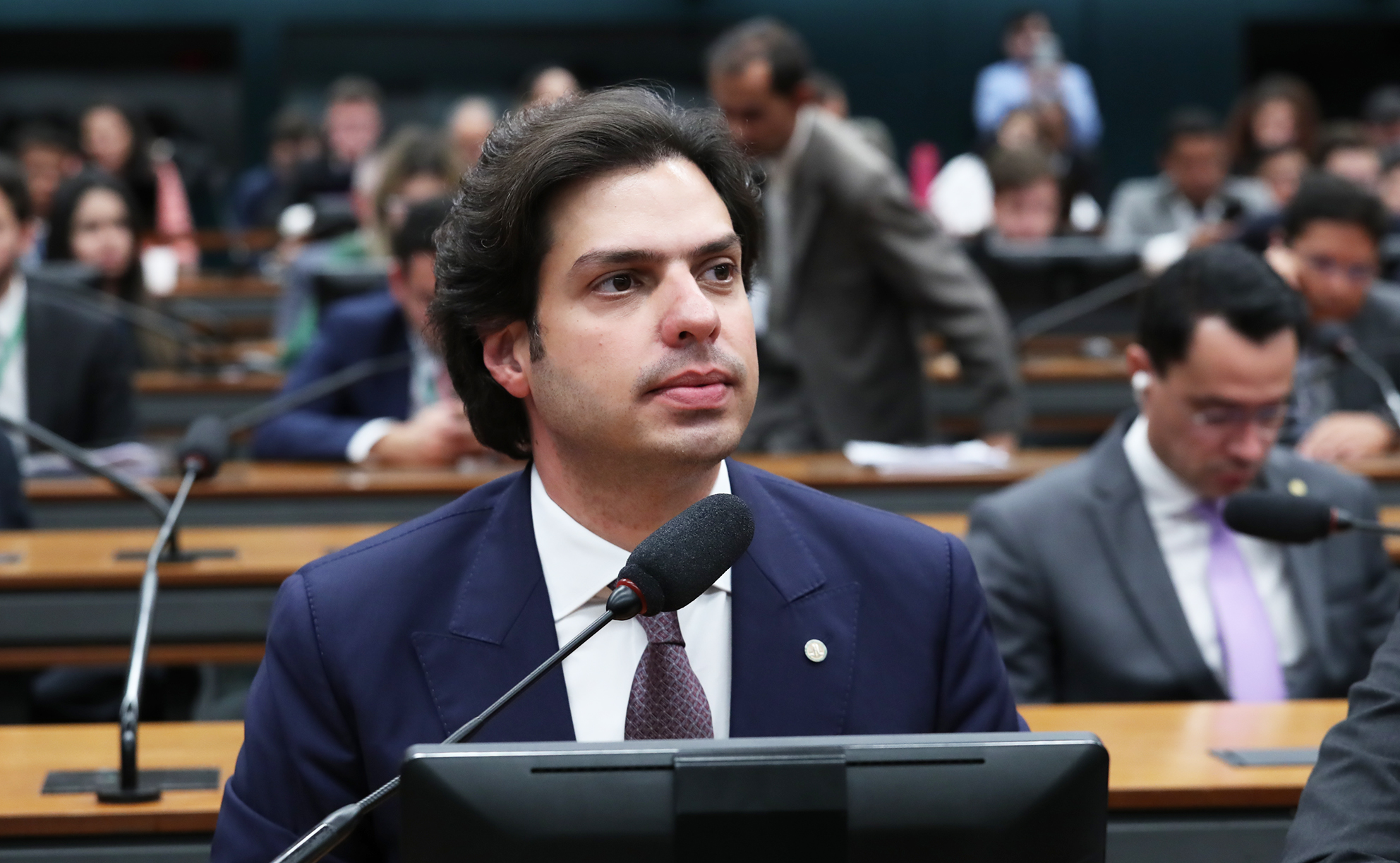
- Albuquerque in 2024

Member of the Chamber of Deputies
- Incumbent
- Assumed office 1 February 2019
- Constituency: Ceará

Personal details
- Born: Antônio José Aguiar Albuquerque; 26 September 1983 (age 43) Fortaleza, Ceará, Brazil
- Party: PP (since 2015)
- Other political affiliations: PRB (2009–2011); PSB (2011–2013); PROS (2013–2015)

Antônio José Aguiar Albuquerque (born 26 September 1983) is a Brazilian politician serving as a member of the Chamber of Deputies since 2019. From 2013 to 2017, he served as mayor of Massapê. He is the son of Zezinho Albuquerque.
