= Paulista (disambiguation) =

Paulista is a municipality in Pernambuco, Brazil.

Paulista(s) may also refer to:

== Related to São Paulo, Brazil ==
- Paulistas, inhabitants of the state of São Paulo, Brazil
- Paulista (São Paulo Metro), a railway station
- Paulista Avenue, a street in the city of São Paulo
- Paulista Futebol Clube, a football club from Jundiaí, São Paulo
- Campeonato Paulista, a professional football league in the state of São Paulo

== Other places in Brazil ==
- Paulista, Paraíba, a municipality
- Paulistas, Minas Gerais, a municipality
- Paulista River, a river of Bahia

== Brazilian association football players ==
- Paulista (footballer, born 1979), Creedence Clearwater Couto, striker
- Paulista (footballer, born 1988), Fábio Francisco Barros da Trindade, striker
- Daniel Paulista (born 1982), Daniel Pollo Baroni, manager and former defensive midfielder
- Evandro Paulista (born 1987), Evandro Silva do Nascimento, forward
- Gabriel Paulista (born 1990), Gabriel Armando de Abreu, centre-back
- Juninho Paulista (born 1973), Osvaldo Giroldo Júnior, attacking midfielder
- Marcelinho Paulista (born 1973), Marcelo José de Souza, midfielder
