= Marejada =

Celebration in Itajaí, Santa Catarina, Brazil

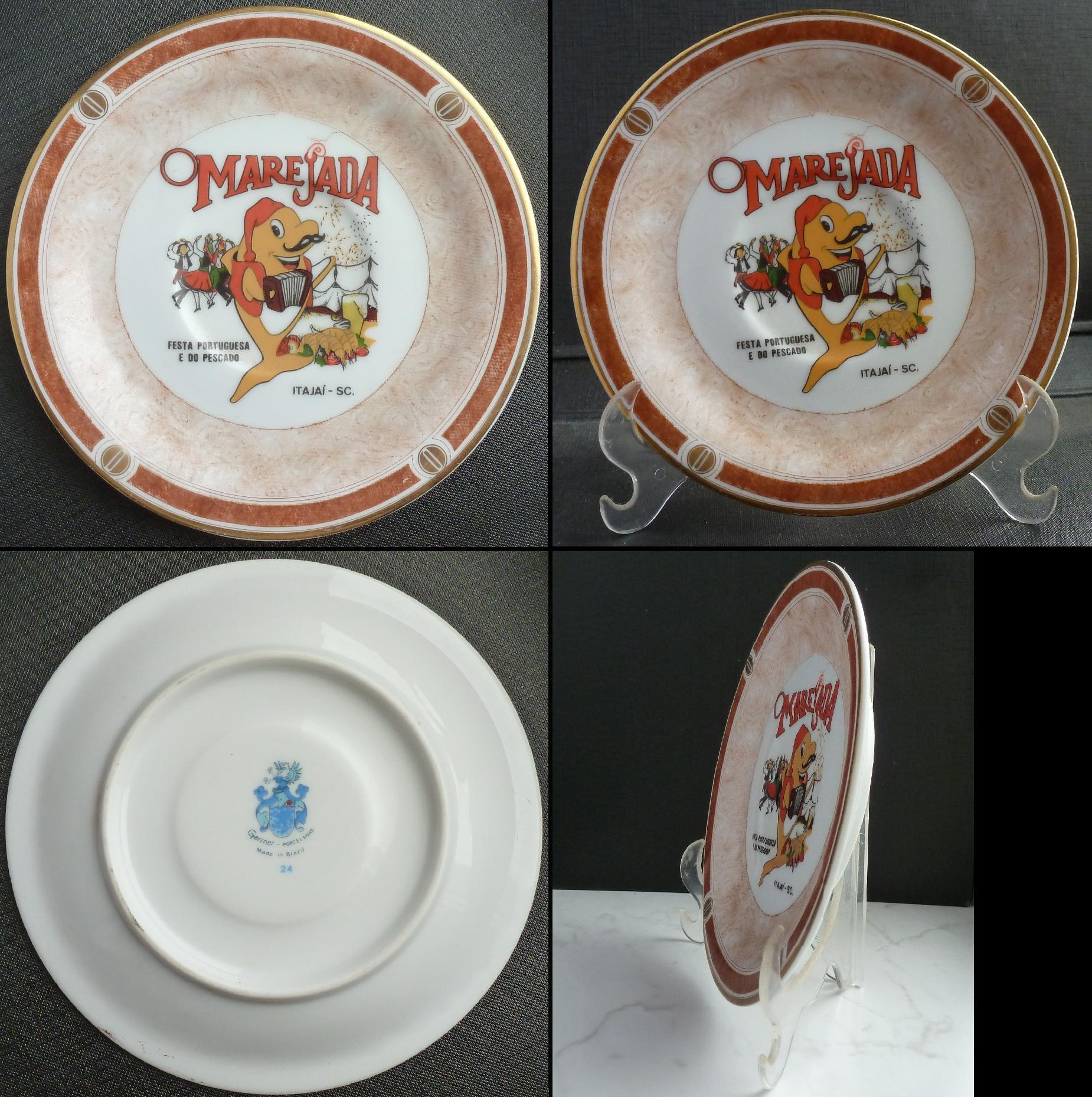
Souvenir plate of Marejada fiesta made in Itajaí, Brazil, by Germer Porcelanas Finas SA

Marejada (Portuguese: Marejada) is one of the most popular national Brazilian celebrations (fiestas) in Itajaí city (Portuguese: Itajaí), Santa Catarina state. This celebration commemorates the first disembarkation of European people from Portugal to the Brazilian coast. Marejada calling from word “mar” (English: sea) and can be translated as Portugalization. The festival also celebrates sea food—fishing is one of the main economic activities of Itajaí regions. The main food on this fiesta is sea food and the main drink is beer—it is why this fiesta looking like beer makers celebrate. Also this fiesta is folklore of Brazil. Symbols of Marejada—fish in cap and human face playing accordion, shrimps on the plate, one glass of beer, dancing group in national clothes—are painted on the souvenir plate from Marejada fiesta (see photo).

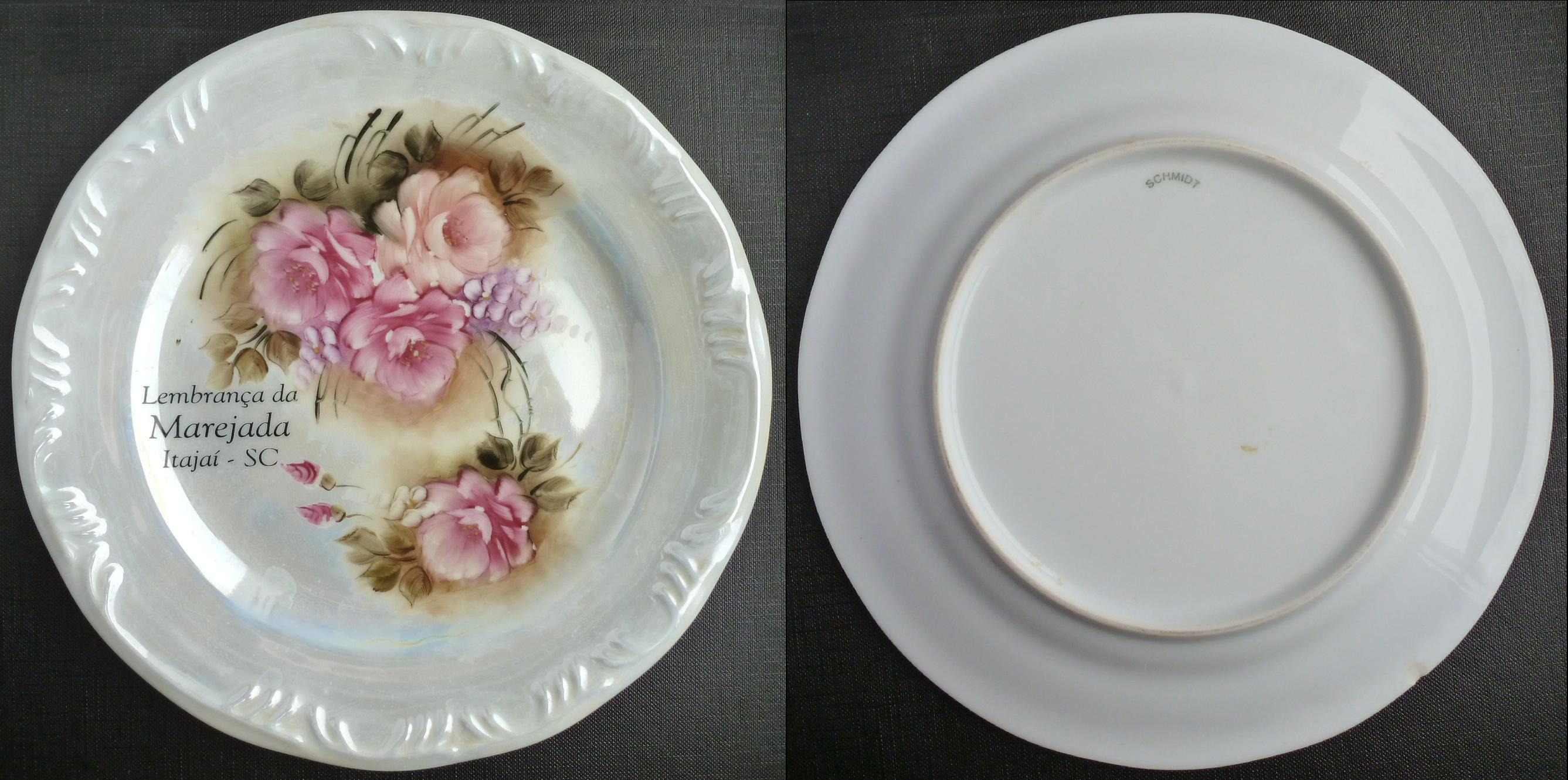
Souvenir plate of Marejada fiesta made in Itajaí, Brazil, by Schmidt Porcelain

You can read on the souvenir plates the following:

- FESTA PORTUGUESA E DO PESCADO – Celebrate of Portugalization and Fishing.
- ITAJAI SC - Itajai Santa Catarina.

Marejada is celebrated every year in October from 1987. For example, this fiesta took place from 8 to 18 October 2009. Due to anniversary of Portugalization it was from 8 to 24 October 2010. There are approximately 600 attractions in a physical space of 36 thousand square meters. In the main pavilion, the night dances gather thousands of people every night.
