= São Sebastião, Alagoas =

Municipality in Alagoas, Brazil

São Sebastião
- Municipality of Alagoas, Brazil
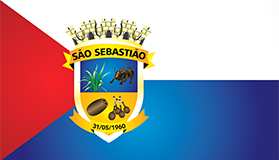
- Flag
- Etymology: Named in honor of the saint and governor at the time of the municipality's founding, Sebastião Muniz Falcão
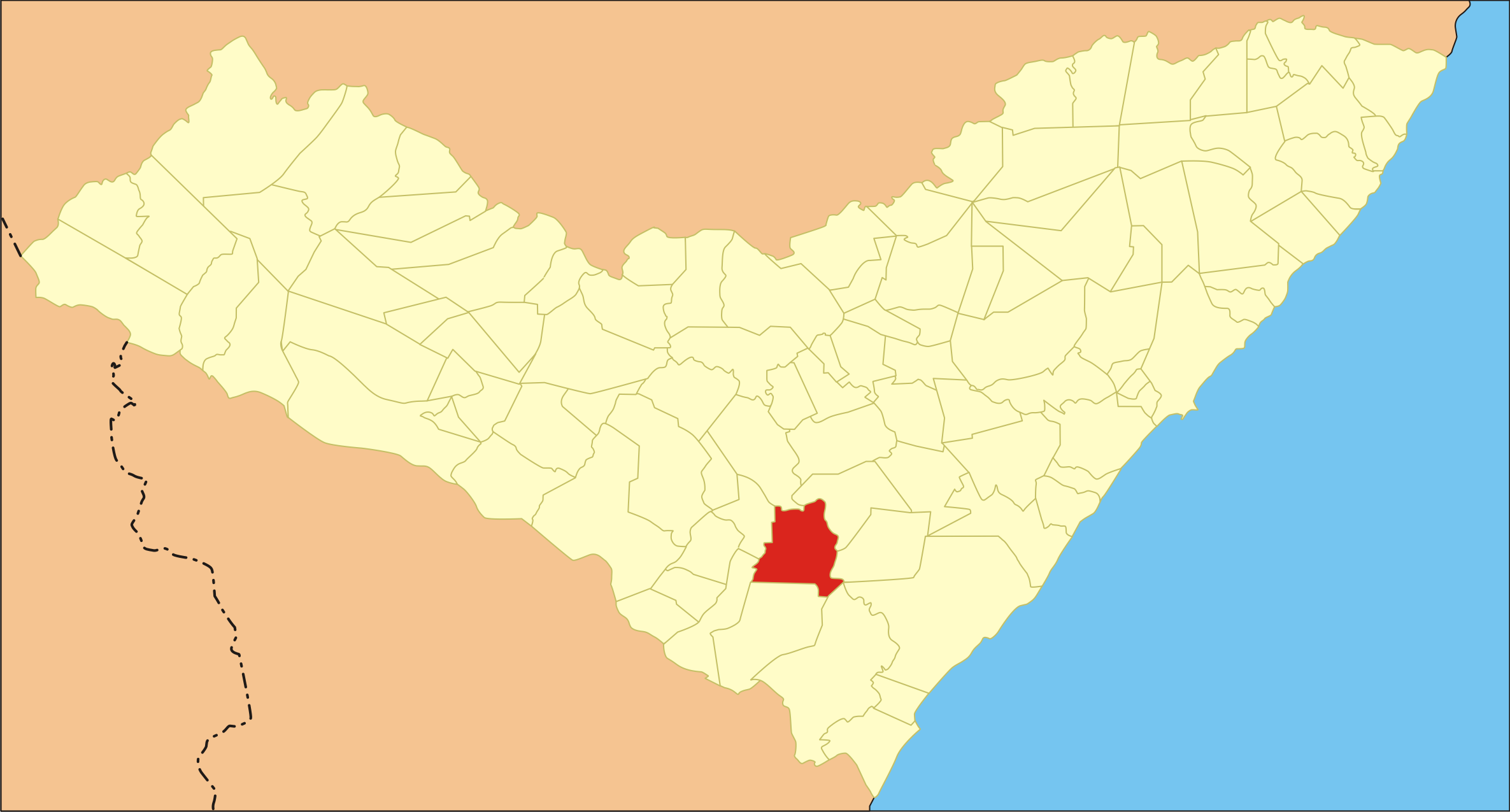
- Location of São Sebastião in Alagoas

- Location within Brazil Location within South America
- Coordinates: 9°56′2″S 36°32′40″W
- Country: Brazil
- Region: Northeast
- State: Alagoas
- Founded: 31 May 1960

Government
  - Mayor: Charles Nunes Regueira (PP) (2025-2028)
  - Vice Mayor: Ana Patricia Alves dos Santos (PP) (2025-2028)

Area
  - Total: 314.924 km^{2} (121.593 sq mi)
- Elevation: 200 m (660 ft)

Population (2022)
  - Total: 31,786
  - Density: 100.93/km^{2} (261.4/sq mi)
- Demonym: Salomeense (Brazilian Portuguese)
- Time zone: UTC-03:00 (Brasília Time)
- Postal code: 57275-000, 57279-000
- HDI (2010): 0.549 – low
- Website: saosebastiao.al.gov.br

São Sebastião (Central northeastern portuguese pronunciation: [ˈsɐ̃w sɛbɐʃtiˈɐ̃w]) is a municipality located in the Brazilian state of Alagoas. Its population was 34,290 (2020) and its area is 306 km^{2}.

== See also ==
- List of municipalities in Alagoas
