= Santa Tereza, Porto Alegre =

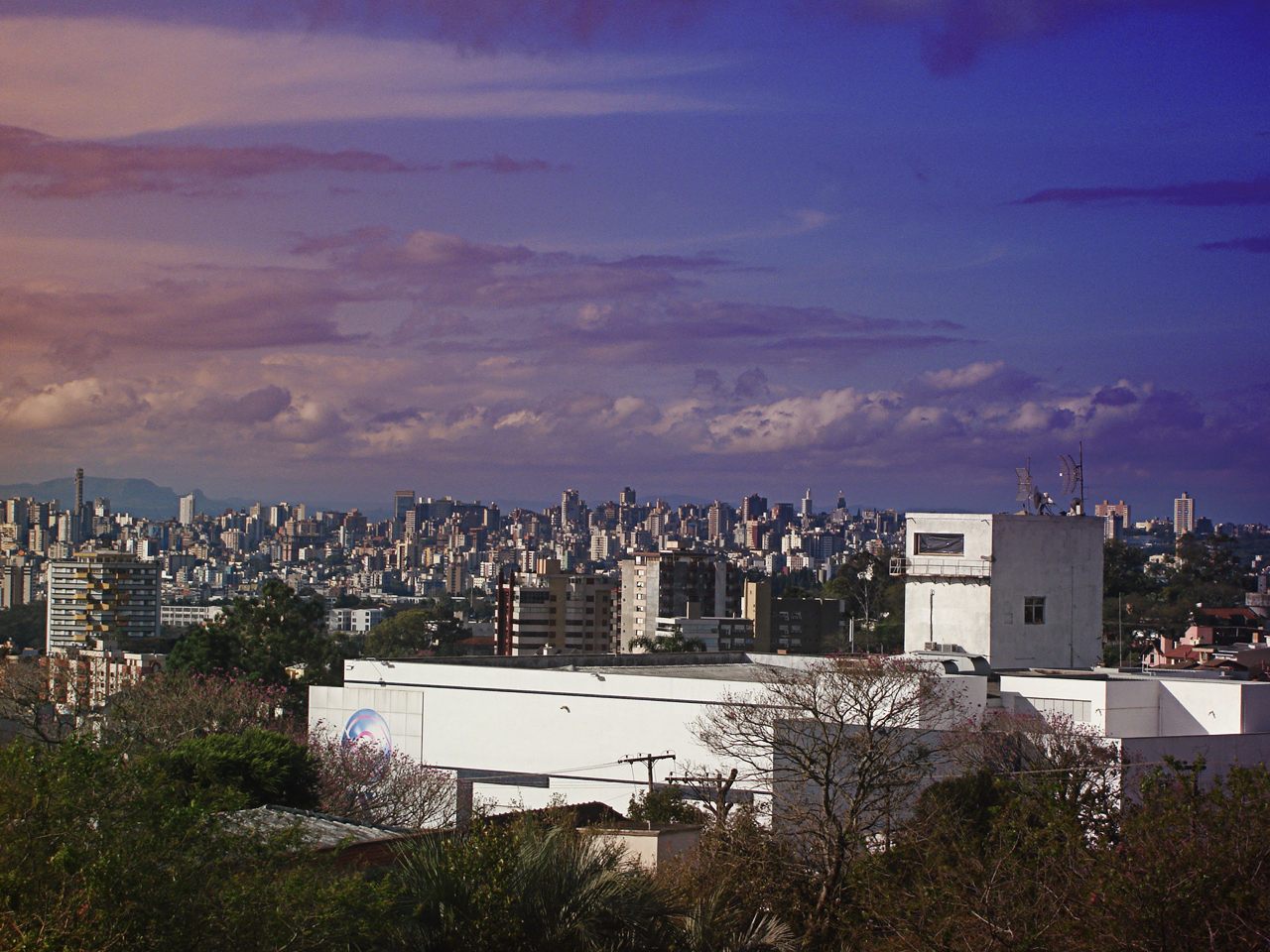
View from Santa Tereza Hill.

Santa Tereza is a neighbourhood (bairro) in the city of Porto Alegre, the state capital of Rio Grande do Sul, in Brazil. It was created by Law 2022 from December 7, 1959.

Santa Tereza is located on a 148 metres (486 ft) homonymous hill, where many broadcasting stations are installed. At the top of the hill is a belvedere.

The Centro Universitário Ritter dos Reis (UniRitter) is located here.
