= Sombrio =

- Municipality
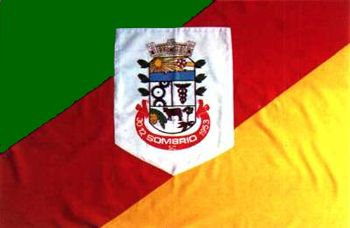
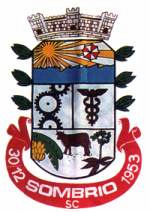
- Flag Coat of arms

- Location in Brazil
- Coordinates: 29°06′14″S 49°37′44″W
- Country: Brazil
- Region: South
- State: Santa Catarina
- Mesoregion: Sul Catarinense
- Founded: 1820

Area
  - Total: 142.745 km^{2} (55.114 sq mi)
- Elevation: 10 m (33 ft)

Population (2020)
  - Total: 30,733
  - Density: 215.30/km^{2} (557.62/sq mi)
- Time zone: UTC −3
- Postal code: 889600-000
- Area code: (+55) 48

Sombrio is a municipality in the state of Santa Catarina in the South region of Brazil.

== Economy ==
In agriculture, the main products are rice, tobacco and banana. In industry, there are clothing, ceramics, furniture and footwear, and commerce, clothing stores, materials construction, appliance stores, among others.

== Tourism ==
The city of Sombrio has as main tourist sights the Furnas, Morro da Moça, Morro da Santa and the Calçadão Cultural. Its main festive dates are the city's birthday, on December 30, Festa do Padroeiro on June 13, and Arraialfest, a large party held every two years, usually in the last final of July week. For many years an explanation has been sought for this name, which many do not like because of the sadness and discouragement that the same erroneously seems to contain. In the present case the name connects to the word shadow, remembering rest. Certain fig trees which served as a place where the traveler rested, fleeing from the heat of the heat, shaded people, from which came the name of the city. At that time it was the only way to the city of Viamão and many travelers stopped in the shade of the trees to rest, hence the name of the city, only in 1820 the village that gave rise to Sombrio appeared.

== Climate ==
Sombrio is classified as humid subtropical climate (Köppen climate classification Cfa), the temperature rises to 28°C, and is rarely below 7°C or above 32°C.

== See also ==
- List of municipalities in Santa Catarina
