= Pedras de Fogo =

Coordinates: 7°23′S 35°07′W

- Municipality
- Pedras de Fogo, Paraíba, Brazil
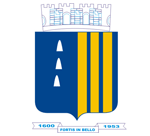
- Flag Coat of arms

- Country: Brazil
- Region: Northeast
- State: Paraíba
- Mesoregion: Mata Paraibana

Population (2020)
  - Total: 28,533
- Time zone: UTC−3 (BRT)

Pedras de Fogo is a municipality in the state of Paraíba in the Northeast Region of Brazil.

== See also ==
- List of municipalities in Paraíba
