= Biguaçu =

- Municipality
- Flag Coat of arms

- Location in Brazil
- Coordinates: 27°30′S 48°40′W
- Country: Brazil
- Region: South
- State: Santa Catarina
- Mesoregion: Grande Florianópolis

Population (2020)
  - Total: 69,486
- Time zone: UTC−3 (BRT)

Biguaçu is a municipality in the state of Santa Catarina in the South region of Brazil.

== See also ==
- List of municipalities in Santa Catarina
