= Itapajé =

Municipality in Ceará, Brazil

Coordinates: 3°41′S 39°35′W

Itapaje
- Municipality
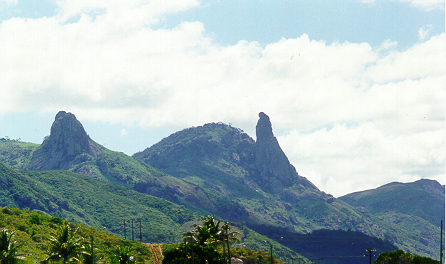
- Itapajé

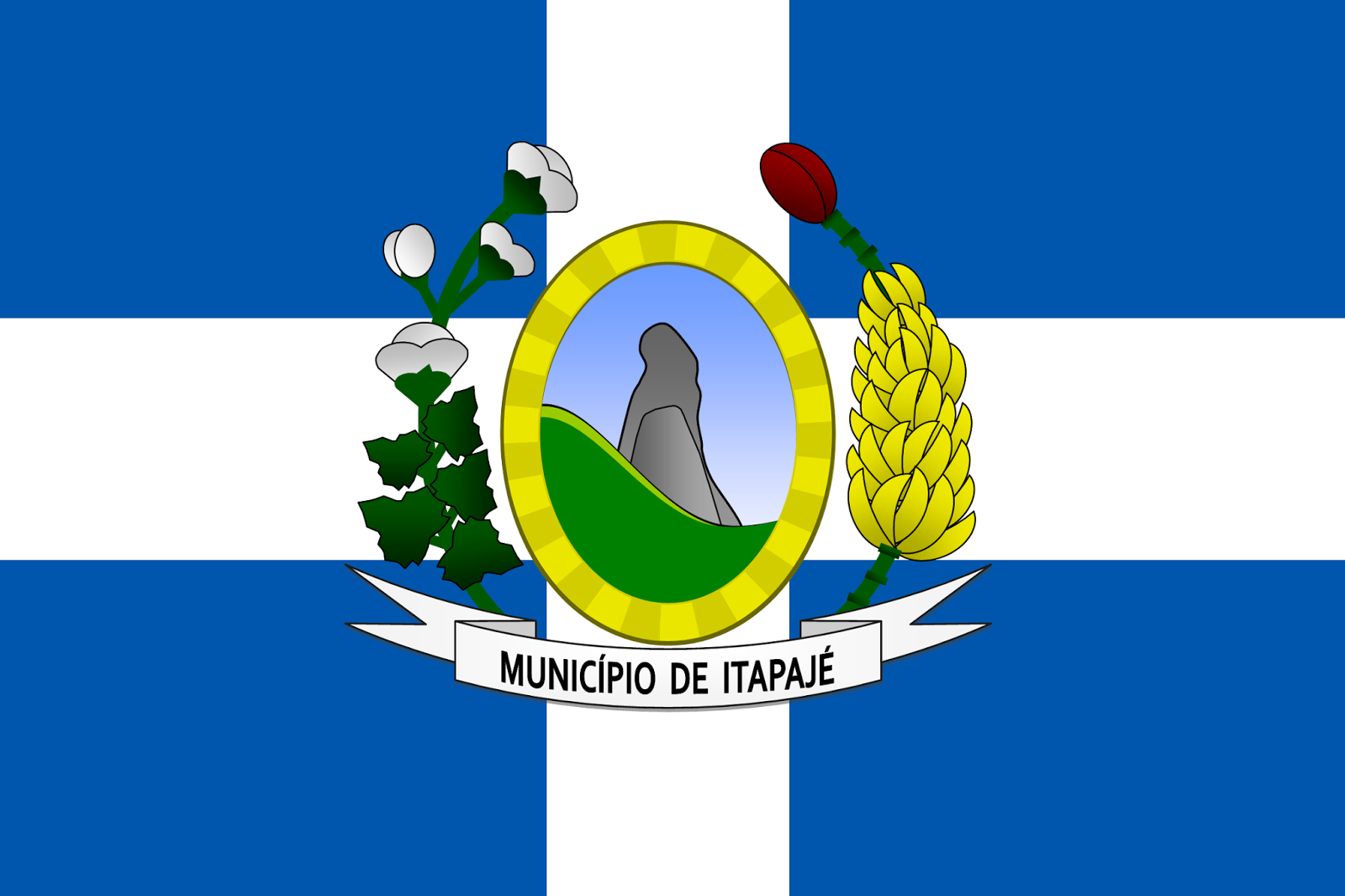
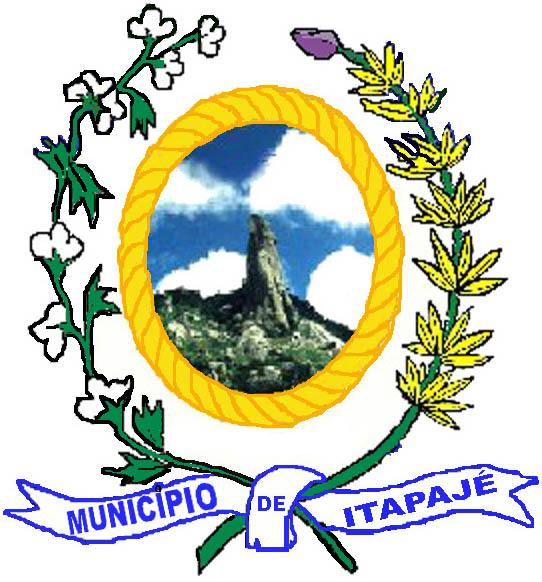
- Flag Coat of arms
- Interactive map of Itapaje
- Country: Brazil
- Region: Nordeste
- State: Ceará
- Mesoregion: Noroeste Cearense

Population (2020)
  - Total: 53,067
- Time zone: UTC−3 (BRT)

Itapaje is a municipality in the state of Ceará in the Northeast region of Brazil.

== See also ==
- List of municipalities in Ceará
