= Paulista, Paraíba =

Coordinates: 6°35′38″S 37°37′26″W

- Municipality
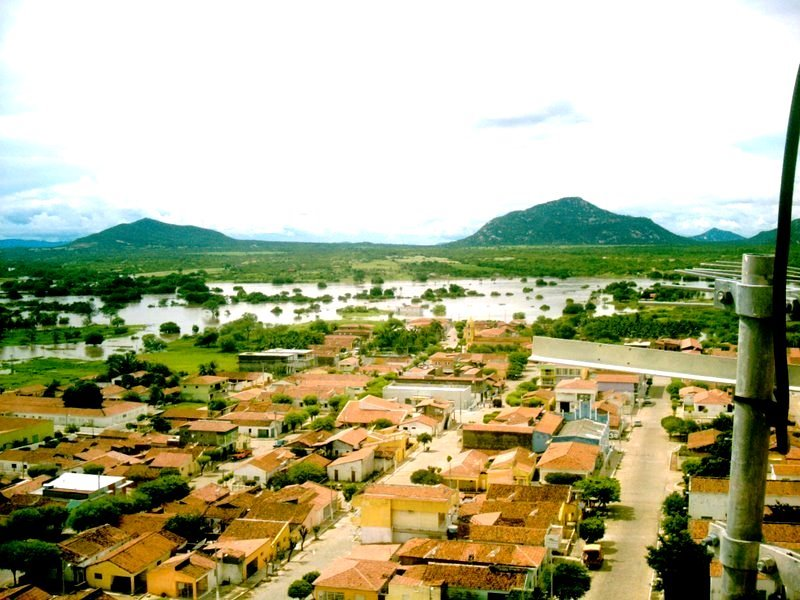

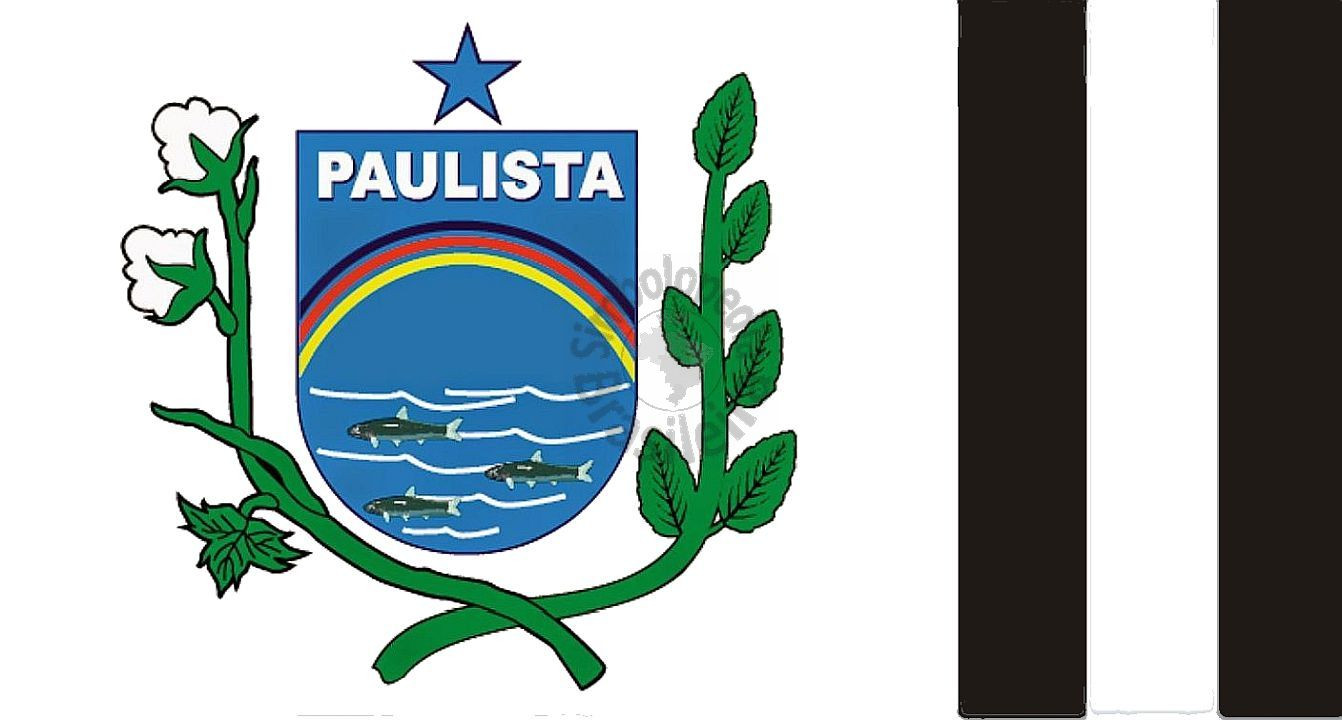
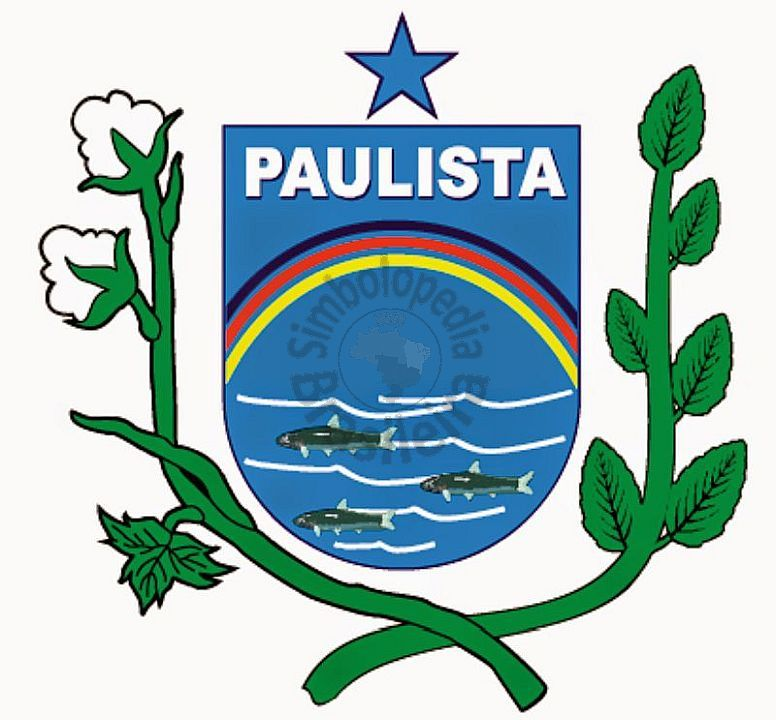
- Flag Coat of arms
- Interactive map of Paulista, Paraíba
- Country: Brazil
- Region: Northeast
- State: Paraíba
- Mesoregion: Sertao Paraibana

Population (2020)
  - Total: 12,379
- Time zone: UTC−3 (BRT)

Paulista, Paraíba is a municipality in the state of Paraíba in the Northeast Region of Brazil.

As of the 2022 Census, it had population of 11,834.

== See also ==
- List of municipalities in Paraíba
