= Céu Azul =

Céu Azul-Paraná Céu Azul-Paraná
- Municipality
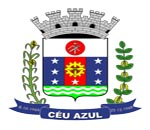
- Flag Coat of arms
- Nickname: Céu Azul-Paraná
- Location of Céu Azul in Paraná

- Location in Brazil
- Coordinates: 25°8′49″S 53°50′56″W
- Country: Brazil
- Region: Southern
- State: Paraná
- Mesoregion: Oeste Paranaense

Government
  - Mayor: Jaime Basso

Area
  - Total: 455.4 sq mi (1,179.5 km^{2})

Population (2020)
  - Total: 11,819
  - Density: 24.2/sq mi (9.35/km^{2})
- Time zone: UTC−3 (BRT)

Céu Azul is a municipality in the state of Paraná in the Southern Region of Brazil.

Céu Azul covers 1,179.5 square kilometres (455.4 mi^{2}), has a population of 11,819, and population density of 9.35 resident per square kilometer. 852 square kilometres (329 mi^{2}) of the city is preserved as Atlantic Forest and is part of Iguaçu National Park.

The western region of Paraná was the target of logging companies in the 1950s. The company Pinho e Terras Ltda. installed a colony in the area in 1952 and brought workers, mainly from the state of Rio Grande do Sul. The first residents were primarily of German and Italian origin.

== See also ==
- List of municipalities in Paraná
