= Ituberá =

Municipality of Bahia, Brazil

Coordinates: 13°44′S 39°09′W

- Municipality
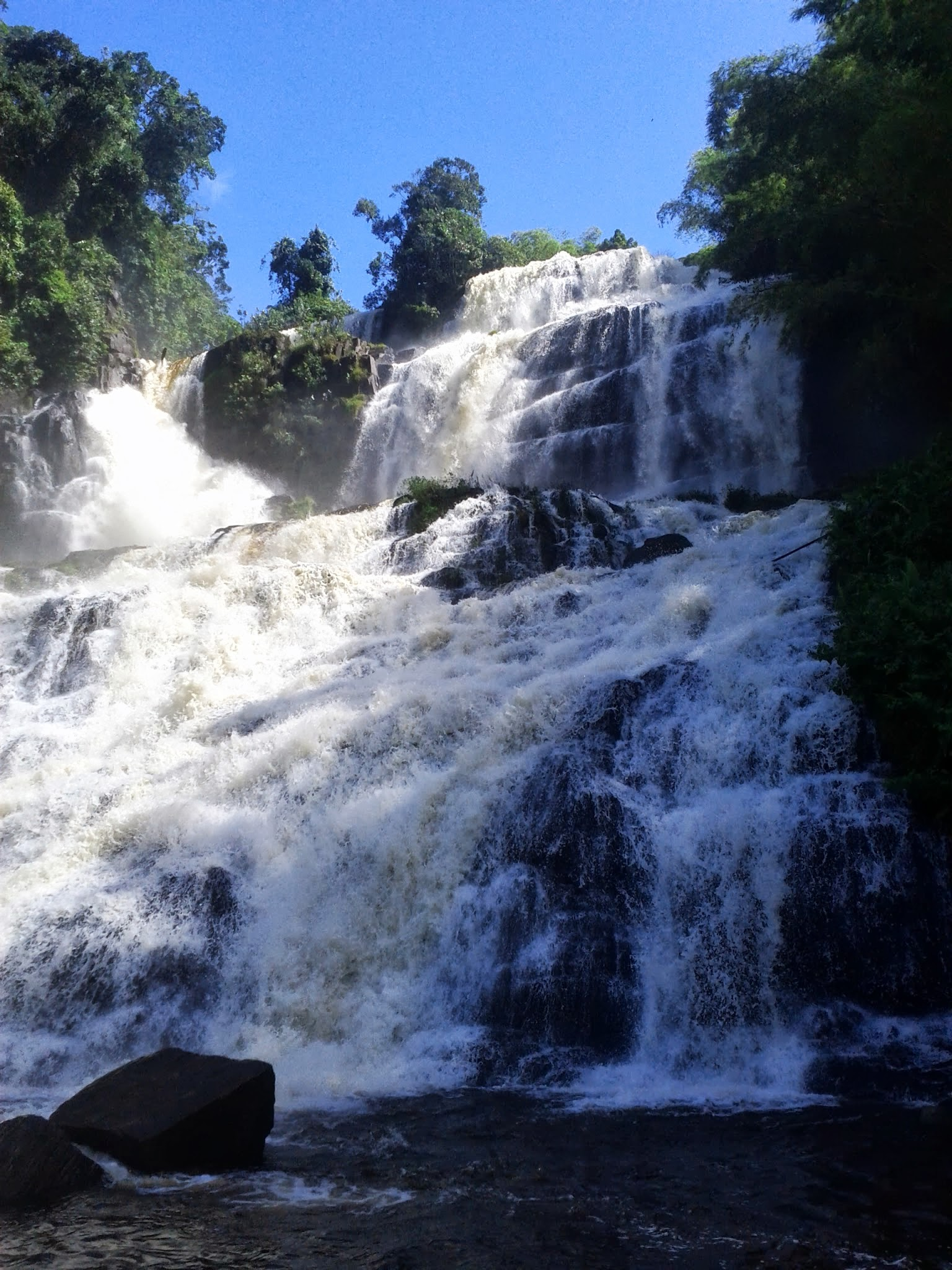

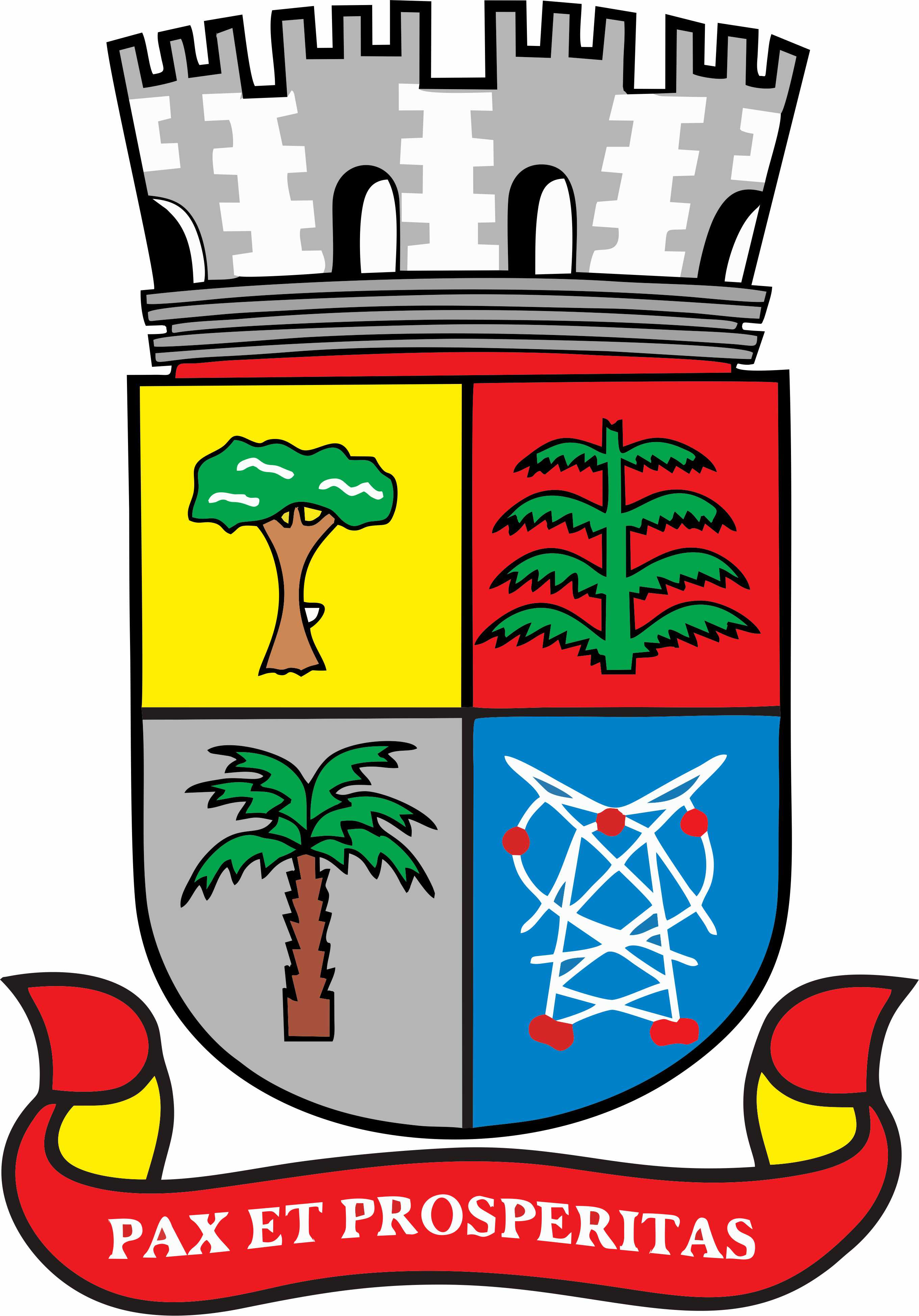
- Coat of arms
- Interactive map of Ituberá
- Country: Brazil
- Region: Nordeste
- State: Bahia

Population (2020)
  - Total: 28,740
- Time zone: UTC−3 (BRT)

Ituberá is a municipality in the state of Bahia in the North-East region of Brazil.

== See also ==
- List of municipalities in Bahia
