= Naque =

- Municipality
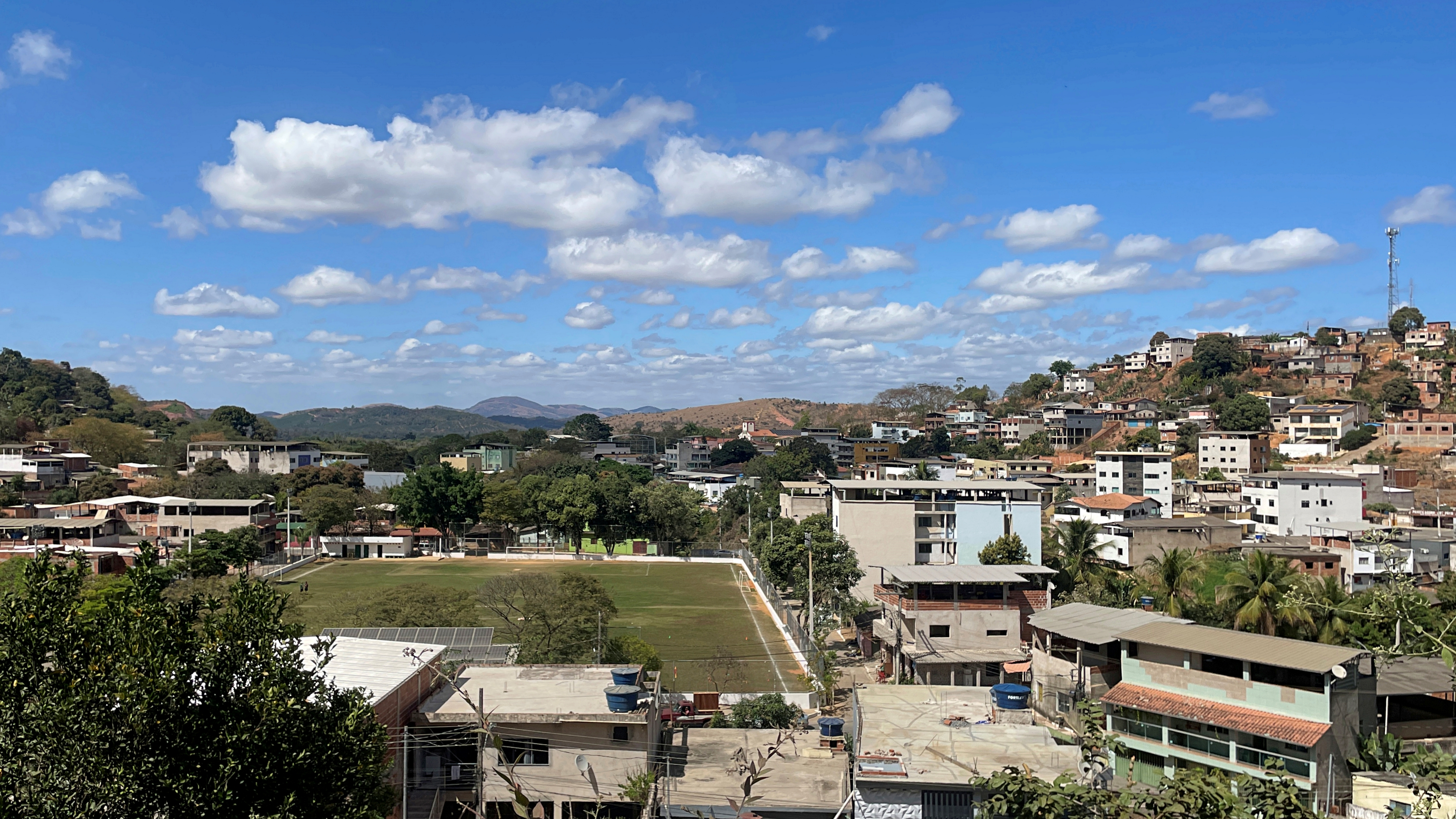
- View of Naque

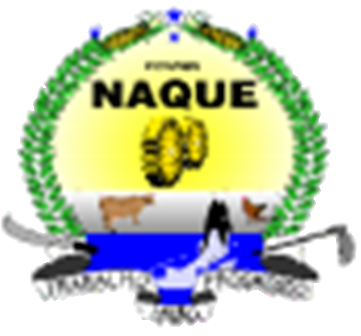
- Coat of arms

- Location in Brazil
- Coordinates: 19°13′48″S 42°19′40″W
- Country: Brazil
- Region: Southeast
- State: Minas Gerais
- Mesoregion: Vale do Rio Doce

Population (2022 Census)
  - Total: 6,303
  - Estimate (2025): 6,443
- Time zone: UTC−3 (BRT)

Naque is a municipality in the state of Minas Gerais in the Southeast region of Brazil.

== See also ==
- List of municipalities in Minas Gerais
