= Ilhota =

Coordinates: 26°54′S 48°52′W

Ilhota, SC
- Municipality
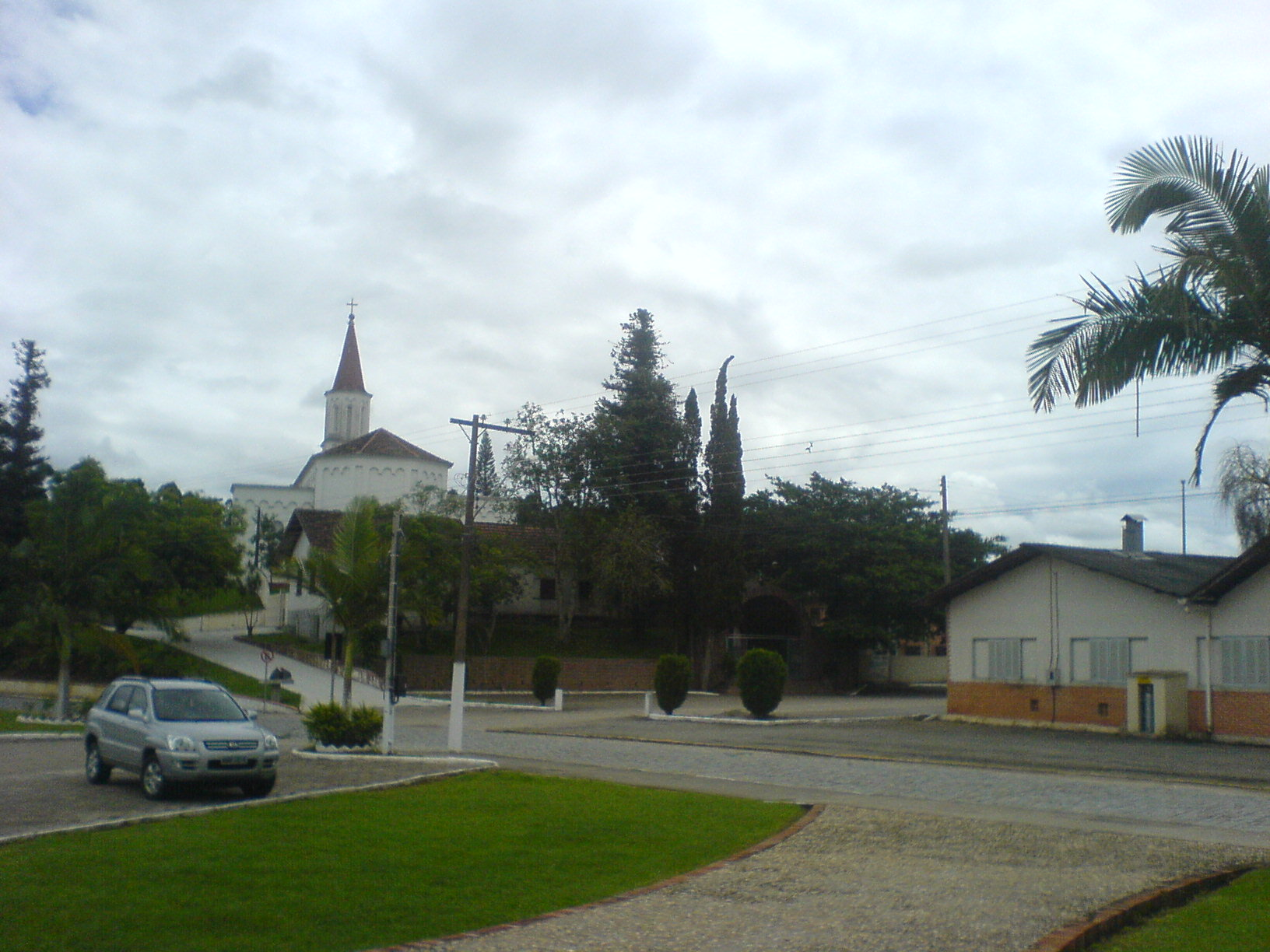

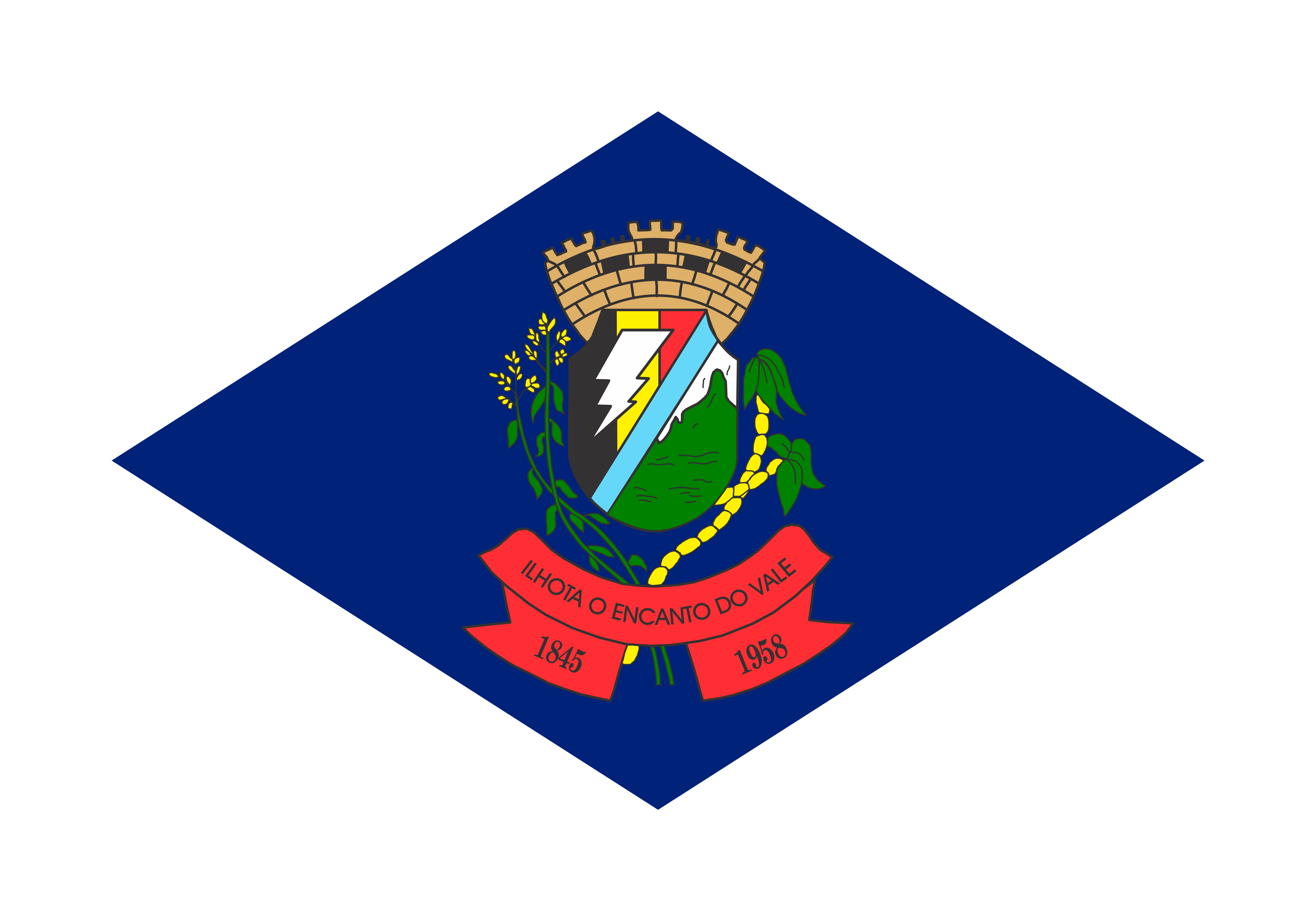
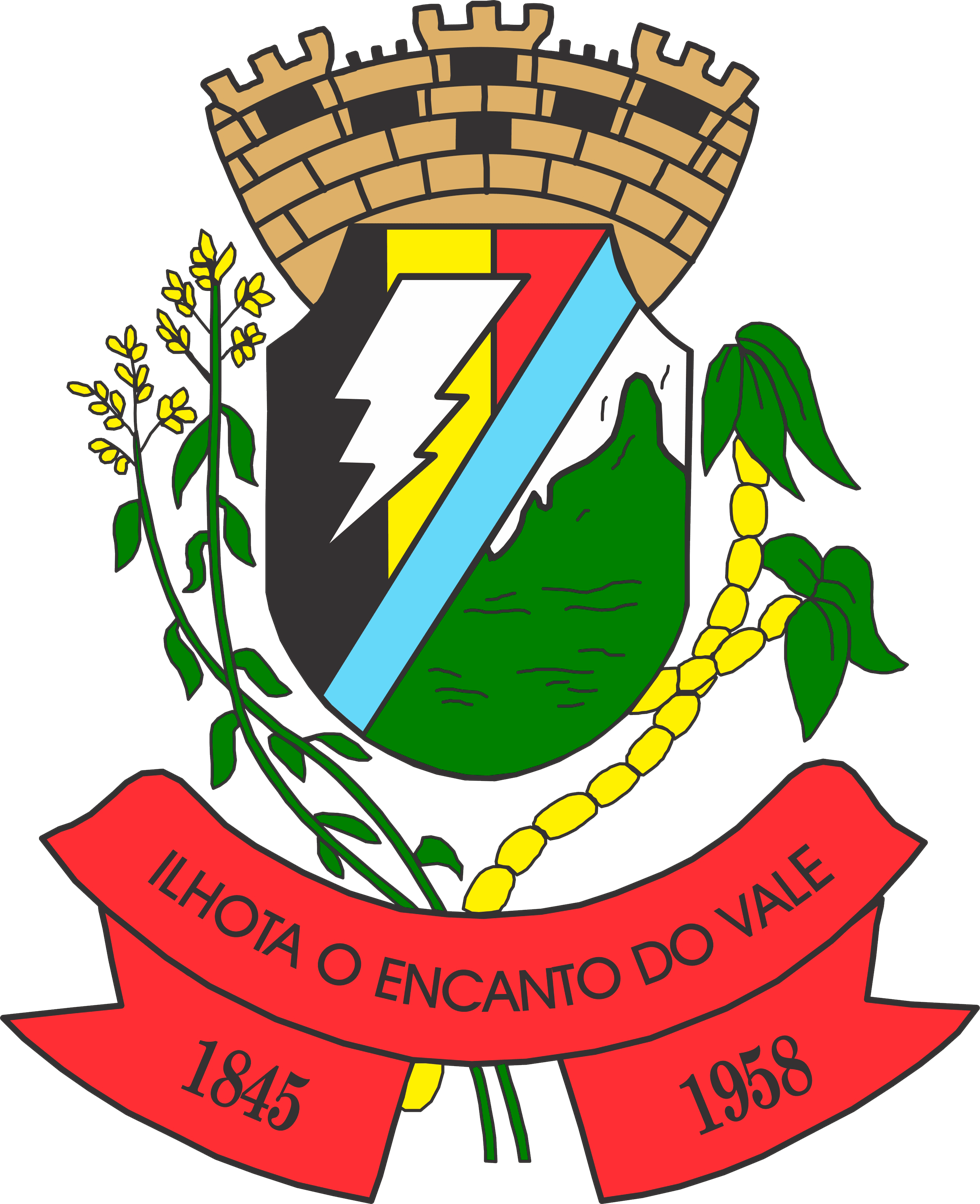
- Flag Coat of arms
- Interactive map of Ilhota, SC
- Country: Brazil
- Region: South
- State: Santa Catarina
- Mesoregion: Vale do Itajai

Population (2020)
  - Total: 14,359
- Time zone: UTC -3

Ilhota is a municipality in the state of Santa Catarina in the South region of Brazil.

== See also ==
- List of municipalities in Santa Catarina
