= Santa Tereza do Oeste =

Coordinates: 25.0519°S 53.6328°W

- Municipality
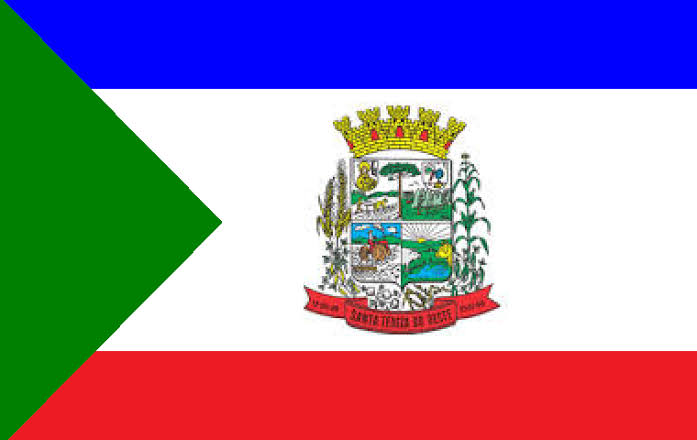
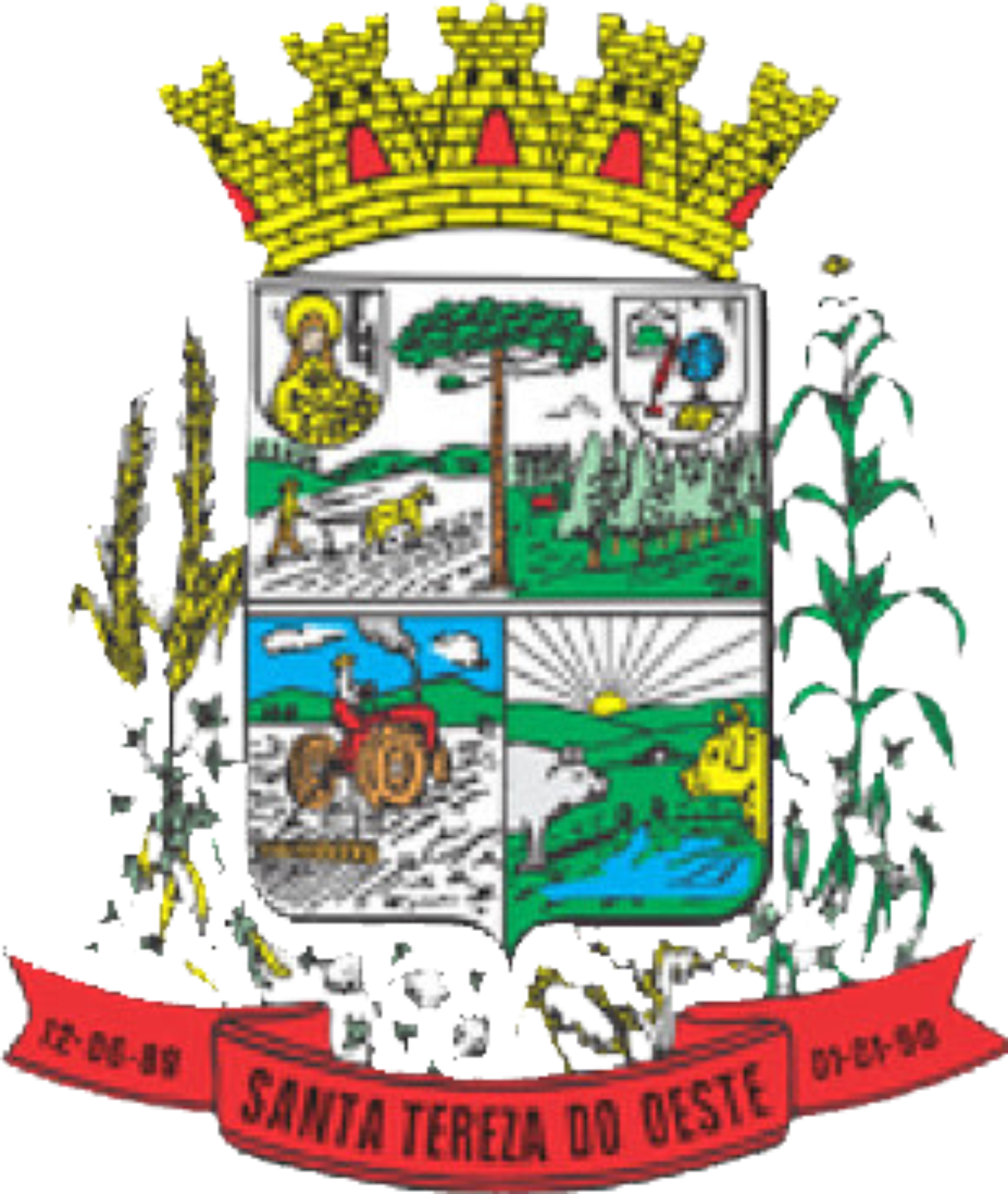
- Flag Coat of arms
- Interactive map of Santa Tereza do Oeste
- Country: Brazil
- Region: Southern
- State: Paraná
- Mesoregion: Oeste Paranaense

Population (2020)
  - Total: 10,096
- Time zone: UTC−3 (BRT)

Santa Tereza do Oeste is a municipality in the state of Paraná in the Southern Region of Brazil.

== See also ==
- List of municipalities in Paraná
