= Fesa =

Fesa or FESA may refer to:

- Fesa (arachnid), a genus of insects
- Fesa Evrensev (1878–1951), a Turkish aviator
- Fire and Emergency Services Authority of Western Australia, a former name for the "Department of Fire and Emergency Services"
- Turin FESA F.C., a Salvadoran professional football club
- Federation of European Shogi Associations
