= Aviation Martyrs' Monument =

Military monument in Turkey

Aviation Martyrs' Monument Hava Şehitleri Anıtı formerly Tayyare Şehitleri Abidesi
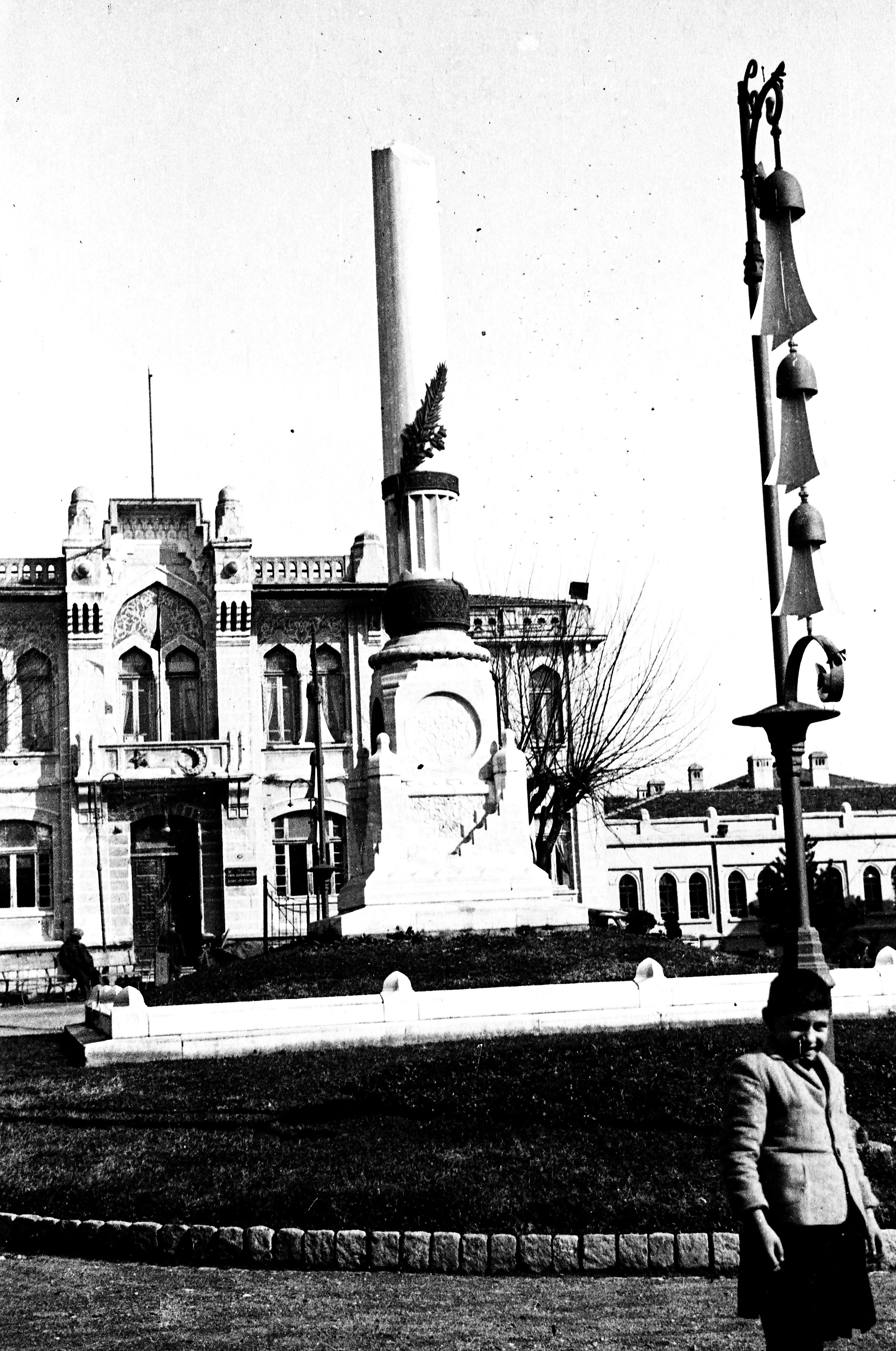
- Aviation Martyrs' Monument
- Interactive map of Aviation Martyrs' Monument; Hava Şehitleri Anıtı formerly Tayyare Şehitleri Abidesi
- Location: Fatih, Istanbul in Turkey
- Coordinates: 41°00′56″N 28°57′15″E
- Designer: Vedat Tek
- Type: Memorial
- Material: White marble with bronze applications
- Height: around 7.50 m (24.6 ft)
- Beginning date: April 2, 1914
- Completion date: 1916
- Dedicated to: The first martyrs of the Ottoman aviation squadrons

The Aviation Martyrs' Monument (Turkish: Hava Şehitleri Anıtı or formerly Tayyare Şehitleri Abidesi), located in Fatih district of Istanbul, Turkey, is a memorial dedicated to the first soldiers of the Ottoman Airforce to be killed in flight accidents. In Turkey, one use of the term "martyr" is as an honorific for people killed in action during war.

The monument was commissioned right after the consecutive crash of two monoplanes in Palestine, killing three of the four military aviators who were on an expedition flight from Istanbul to Alexandria in early 1914. The monument, in form of a column, was inaugurated in 1916. A military memorial ceremony is held in front of the monument every year on Martyrs' Day.

== History ==
Following the Balkan Wars, the government of the Ottoman Empire launched a prestigious expedition across the empire's holdings. A multiple-leg flight of four air force monoplanes from Istanbul to Cairo and Alexandria in Egypt, it would cover a distance of nearly 2,500 km (1,600 mi). The planes left Istanbul from the Aviation School in Hagios Stefanos (modern Yeşilköy) on February 8 manned by two aviators each.

The first team's aircraft, a Blériot XI, crashed on February 27 on the flight leg from Damascus to Jerusalem by Al-Samra near the Sea of Galilee, killing pilot Navy Lieutenant (Ottoman Turkish: Bahriye Yüzbaşısı) Fethi Bey and his navigator, Artillery First Lieutenant (Ottoman Turkish: Topçu Mülazım-ı Ula) Sadık Bey. The second team's aircraft, a Deperdussin B, crashed on March 11 into the Mediterranean Sea off Jaffa shortly after take-off. Artillery Second Lieutenant (Ottoman Turkish: Topçu Mülazım-ı Saniye) Nuri Bey was killed while the other aviator, İsmail Hakkı Bey, survived the accident.

All three victims were interred in Damascus. A monument was erected at the crash site near the Sea of Galilee.

== Design and construction ==
The government decided to build a monument in the empire's capital to the commemorate the first martyrs of the Ottoman military aviation. The site chosen for the memorial was a park in Istanbul's Fatih district, in front of the then city hall (currently the Istanbul Fire Department's main building), not far from the Valens Aqueduct.

The memorial's foundation stone was laid on April 2, 1914, by Minister of War Enver Pasha. Its construction lasted two years and it was inaugurated in 1916. Designed by the renowned Turkish architect Vedat Tek, the conical columnar monument features a broken top made of white marble. The broken top symbolizes the flight mission's incomplete status. A branch of laurel made of bronze is fixed on the lower half of the column. The monument is about 7.50 m (24.6 ft) high. A large bronze medallion is attached on each of the two opposite sides of the marble base on which the column stands. On one medallion are inscribed the names and the officer ranks of the victims. On the other are depicted a monoplane, the Beyazıt Tower and the landscape of Istanbul is the form of a relief.

== Commemoration day ==
The first commemoration at the monument was held on its opening day in 1916. However, until 1926 no celebration at all took place.

Following the foundation of the Turkish Aeronautical Association (Turkish: Türk Tayyare Cemiyeti) on February 16, 1925, by Mustafa Kemal Atatürk, 27 January was accepted as the commemoration day for aviation martyrs in honor of pilot Major (Turkish: Binbaşı) Mehmet Fazıl Bey and Petty officer (Turkish: Deniz Astsubay) Mehmet Emin Bey, who were killed on January 27, 1923, during a training flight. As part of the commemoration, all flights in Turkey's airspace were to cease for one hour at noon on that commemoration day. Celebrations for remembrance on January 27 lasted until 1935.

As January is one of the coldest months in Turkey, commemorations could hardly be held. From 1935 the commemoration day was rescheduled for May 15, the day on which Colonel (Ottoman Turkish: Miralay) Fethi Bey, journalist Hasan Tahsin and nine other people were killed in 1919 during the Occupation of İzmir by Greek forces.

In 2002, the commemoration day for the aviation martyrs was merged with the more general Martyrs' Memorial Day by finally changing its date to March 18, which marks the 1915 Battle of March 18 in the Dardanelles Campaign. Since then, aviation martyrs are commemorated together with all other victims who lost their lives in the service of the nation.

== See also ==
- List of public art in Istanbul
