= Bedriye Tahir Gökmen =

Turkish female pilot

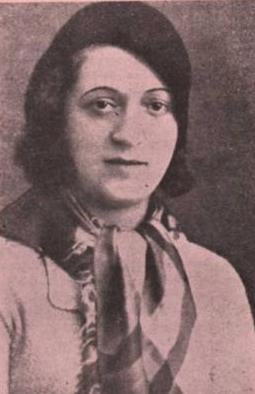
Bedriye Tahir in 1933

Bedriye Tahir Gökmen was an aviator from Turkey. She was the first Turkish woman to earn a pilot license.

== Life ==
Tahir trained at the Vecihi Hürkuş Private Flying School and earned her license in 1933. However, her employer did not approve of her flying, and reduced her salary as a punishment. Nevertheless, she graduated from the flight school in 1934, and applied to the Undersecretary of the Air Force to get her license confirmed. The office sent a team of inspectors to the school; however, due to an accident, the school did not have any aircraft available for Tahir to use to demonstrate her skills. The team did not return, and the school closed later the same year.

A Turkish parachutist, Abdurrahman Türkkuşu, gave her the nickname Gökmen Bacı ("Sister of the Blue Skies"). In 1934, when the Turkish Surname Law was introduced, she took the surname Gökmen.

== See also ==
- Sabiha Gökçen
- Ahmet Ali Çelikten
- Mehmet Fesa Evrensev
