= Ottoman Aviation Squadrons =

Aerial warfare branch of the Ottoman Army from 1909 to 1918

General Inspectorate of Air Forces
- Kuva-yı Havaiye Müfettiş-i Umumiliği (Ottoman Turkish); Osmanlı Tayyare Bölükleri (Turkish)
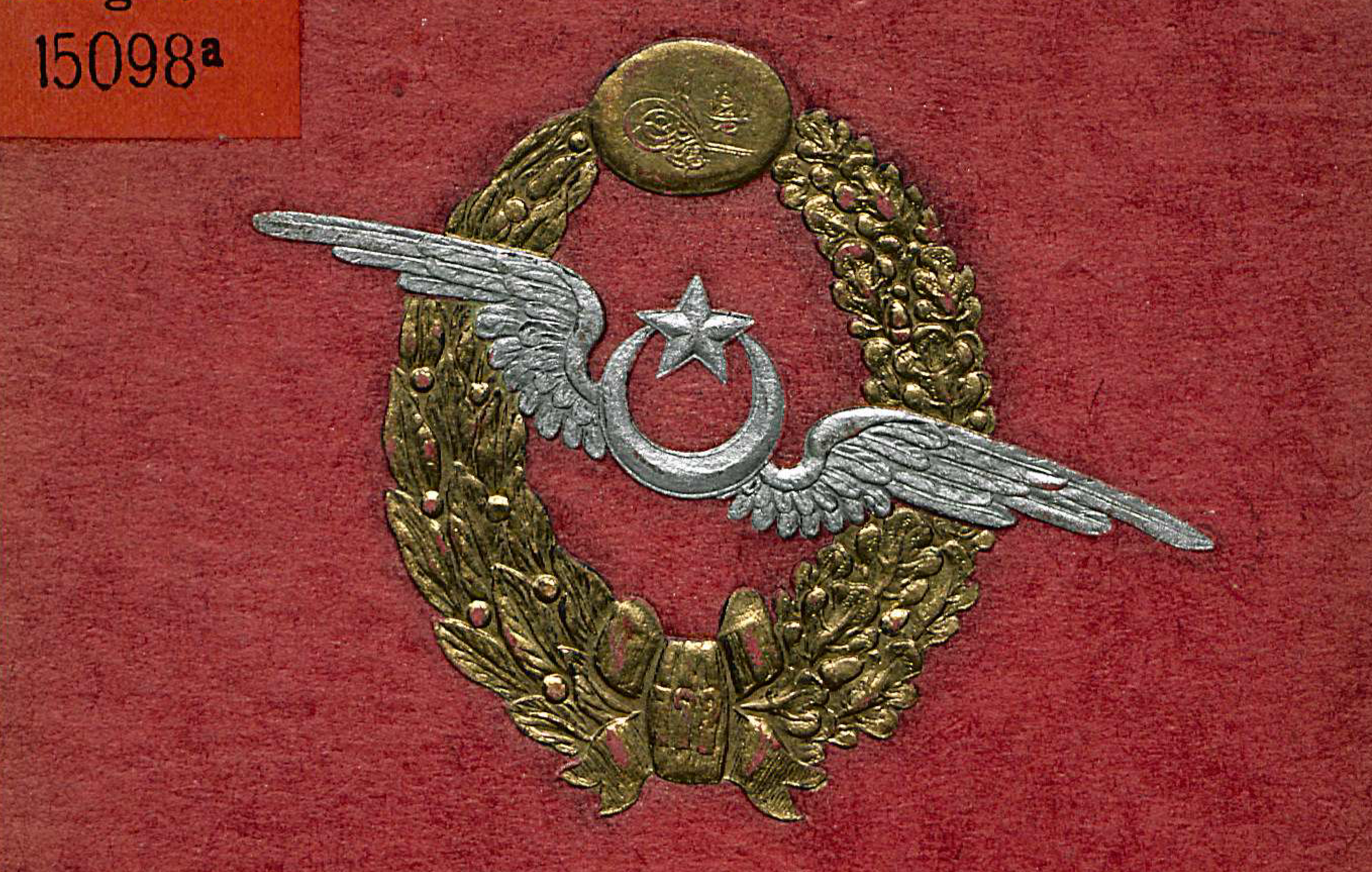
- Roundel of the Ottoman Air Force
- Active: 2 June 1909–30 October 1918
- Country: Ottoman Empire
- Type: Air force
- Role: Aerial warfare
- Size: 90 airplanes in 1916 (peak)
- Part of: Ottoman Empire Armed Forces
- Garrison/HQ: Yeşilköy Air Base, Istanbul, Ottoman Empire
- Colors: White; Red; Black
- Engagements: Italo-Turkish War; First Balkan War; Second Balkan War; World War I

Commanders
- Ceremonial chief: Sultan of the Ottoman Empire

Insignia
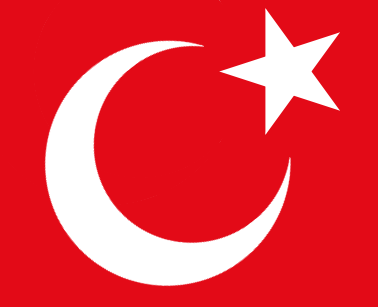
- Fin flash

- Identification symbol

Aircraft flown
- Fighter: Albatros D.III, Albatros D.I, Fokker D.VII, Fokker E.I
- Reconnaissance: Deperdussin Monocoque, Blériot XI, Nieuport, Ponnier M.1, Rumpler B.I, Rumpler C.I, Rumpler C.IV
- Trainer: Blériot XI, Ponnier M.1, Rumpler B.I, Rumpler C.I

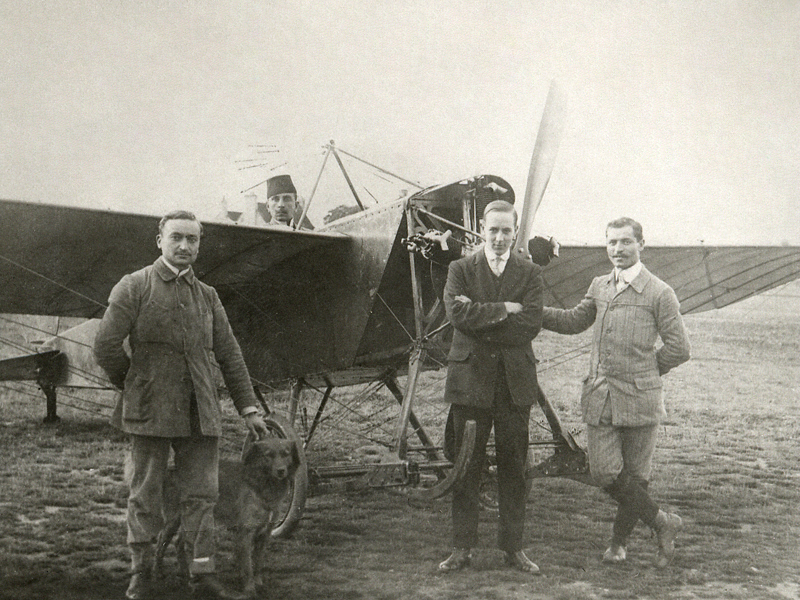
Ottoman Aircraft pilots in early 1912

The Aviation Squadrons of the Ottoman Empire were military aviation units of the Ottoman Army and Navy. The history of Ottoman military aviation dates back to 2 June 1909 (Note: According to Hamit Palabiyik, its formation came about after the Ottoman Empire sent two pilots to the International Aviation Conference in Paris in June 1909 (Hamit Palabiyik, Turkish Public Administration: From Tradition to the Modern Age, USAK Books, 2008, ISBN 978-605-4030-01-9, p. 85.)) or July 1911. (Note: The Turkish Air Force regards flight trainings of Captain Fesa Bey and Lieutenant Yusuf Kenan Bey in 1911 as its own start line and celebrated its 100th anniversary in 2011. "Türk Hava Kuvvetleri 100 Yaşında" in the official website of Turkish Air Force (in Turkish)) The organisation is sometimes referred to as the Ottoman Air Force. (Note: According to Edward J. Erickson, the very term Ottoman Air Force is a gross exaggeration and the term Osmanlı Hava Kuvvetleri (Ottoman Air Force) unfortunately is often repeated in contemporary Turkish sources. (Edward J. Erickson, Ordered To Die: A History of the Ottoman Army in the First World War, "Appendix D The Ottoman Aviation Inspectorate and Aviation Squadrons", ISBN 0-313-31516-7, p. 227.)) (Note: According to GlobalSecurity.org, the Ottoman aviation units never came under a centralised operational (as opposed to administrative) command, and never matured into an independent arm or corps as it did in other countries. Flying detachments (Tayyare Bölüğü) and fighter squadrons (Av Bölüğü) reported individually to either an Army or Corps command., Ottoman Air Branch – 1914–1918 – The Great War in the official website of the GlobalSecurity.org.) The fleet size reached its apex in December 1916, when the Ottoman aviation squadrons had 90 airplanes. The Aviation Squadrons were reorganized as the General Inspectorate of Air Forces (Kuva-yı Havaiye Müfettiş-i Umumiliği) on 29 July 1918. With the signing of the Armistice of Mudros on 30 October 1918, the Ottoman military aviation effectively came to an end. At the time of the armistice, the Ottoman military aviation had around 100 pilots; 17 land-based airplane companies (4 planes each); and 3 seaplane companies (4 planes each); totalling 80 aircraft.

== Establishment of the flight school and war units ==
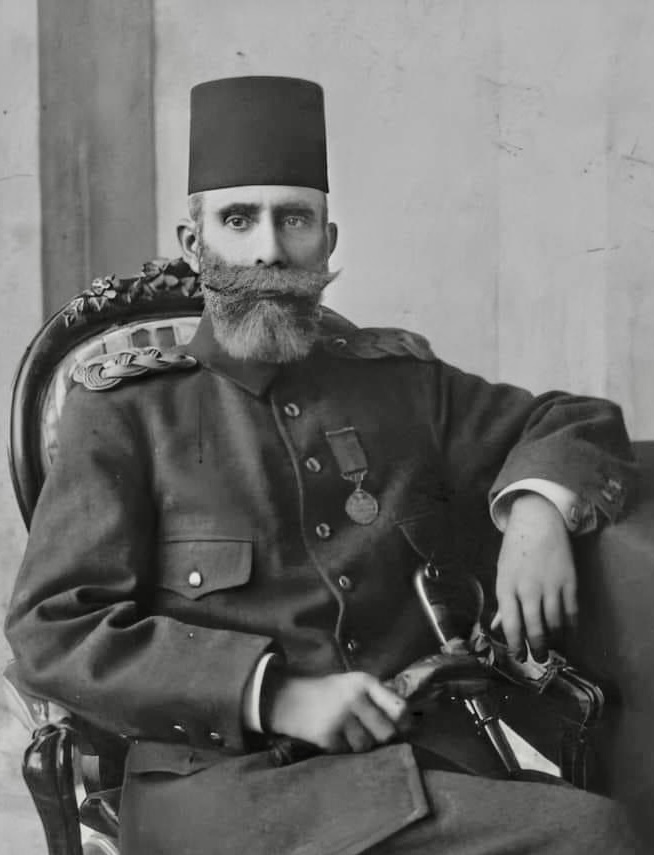
Mahmud Shevket Pasha was instrumental in founding the Ottoman Aviation Squadrons

On 2 December 1909, Louis Blériot and the Belgian pilot Baron Pierre de Caters performed the first flight demonstration in the Ottoman Empire. After witnessing the growing importance of an air combat support branch, the Ottoman government decided to organize its own military aviation program. For this purpose officers were sent to Europe by the end of 1910 for pilot training. However, due to financial difficulties, the student program was aborted and the trainees returned to the Ottoman Empire in the spring of 1911.

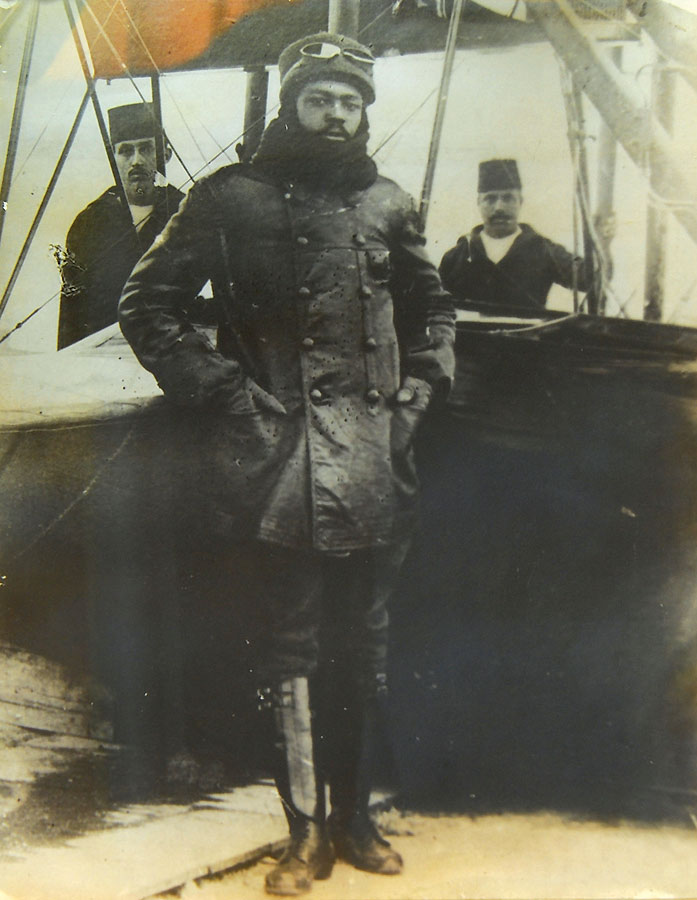
Ahmet Ali Çelikten, an Afro Turk, was the first black aviator in history

Although left without any governmental guidelines for establishing an air force, the Ottoman Minister of War of the time, Mahmud Shevket Pasha, continued to encourage the idea of a military aviation program. On 28 June 1911, a written examination was held and on 4 July, Cavalry Captain Mehmet Fesa (Evrensev) and Engineer Lieutenant Yusuf Kenan were selected. Mehmet Fesa was sent to France and Yusuf Kenan was sent to Germany. But because the German school wanted an excessively high fee, both of them were enrolled in the Blériot School at Étampes near Paris in July 1911.

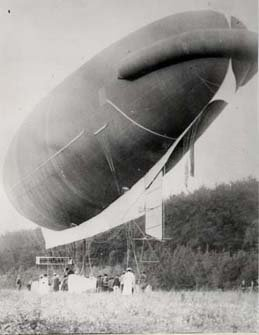
Yeşilköy Air Base in 1911

In late 1911 Staff Lieutenant Colonel Süreyya (İlmen) was entrusted with founding the Aircraft Committee (Tayyare Komisyonu) with members from the Inspectorate of Technical and Fortified Formations (Kıtaât-ı Fenniyye ve Mevâki-i Müstahkeme Müfettişligi). Two tent hangars for the Aircraft School (Tayyare Mektebi) were erected in January 1912 at Yeşilköy, west of Istanbul (which is the Atatürk International Airport today.)

On 21 February 1912, Mehmet Fesa and Yusuf Kenan completed their flight training at the Blériot School and returned home with the 780th and 797th French Aero Club certificates. In the same year, eight more Ottoman officers were sent to France for flight training. Fesa Bey and Yusuf Kenan Bey flew over Istanbul on 27 April 1912.

The Ottoman Empire started preparing its first pilots and aircraft, and with the founding of the Aircraft School (Tayyare Mektebi) in Yeşilköy (current Istanbul Atatürk Airport in Yeşilköy) on 3 July 1912, the empire began to train its own flight officers. The founding of the Aircraft School quickened advancement in the military aviation program, increased the number of enlisted persons within it, and gave the new pilots an active role in the Ottoman forces.

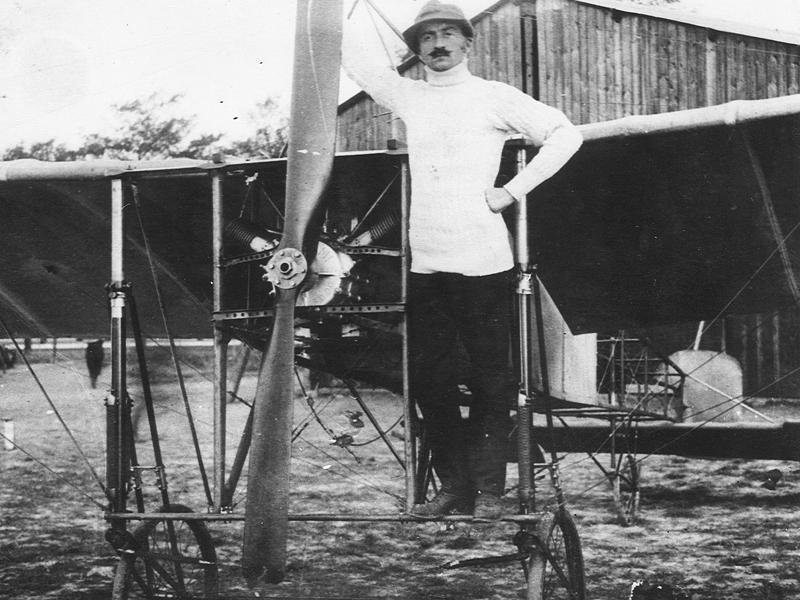
Mehmet Fesa Evrensev (Fesa Bey), 1911

That same year, a single-seat and a two-seater Deperdussin were purchased from France and brought to Istanbul in March 1912. Two of the two-seater version of Bleriot XI-b were also acquired, the first of which was presented by Supreme Commander Rıza Paşa. Three of a different two-seat model named XI-2 and three of the single-seat ground trainer Pingouin were also used by the Ottoman Army.

The REP (Robert Esnault-Pelterie) was also one of the first planes to be deployed by the Ottoman Empire. This aircraft was designed by Robert Esnault-Pelterie and its first flight took place in 1912; they entered service during the same year in France. In accordance with an agreement reached between the producer and the Ottoman Ministry of War, seven REP planes were purchased and the first one was planned to join the Ottoman Army on 15 March 1912. In late April 1912, the military aircraft was shown to the public for the first time when a large military parade was held for the honor of Sultan Mehmed V Reshad. Five of the seven purchased were single-seaters and the remaining two were two-seaters. One of the single-seaters was planned only for ground practising. The last plane was confiscated by the Serbians while being brought to Istanbul by train. These aircraft were already out of service by 1914.

By the end of 1912, the Ottoman Army had a total of 15 airplanes, acquired mostly through private donations.

== Italo-Turkish War ==
In 1911, the Kingdom of Italy invaded the Tripolitania Vilayet (modern day Libya) of the Ottoman Empire, using aircraft for reconnaissance and bombing missions for the first time in aviation history (on 23 October 1911, an Italian pilot flew over Ottoman lines for reconnaissance; and the next day Italian dirigibles dropped bombs on ground targets, both of which represented the first effective use of aircraft in combat.)

Ottoman troops opened fire on an Italian aircraft on 15 December 1911. The first wartime aircraft fatality was that of Lieutenant Manzini, immediately after takeoff, on 25 August 1912 and the first aircraft to be captured was that of Captain Moizo, on 10 September 1912.

When Italy invaded the Tripolitania Vilayet, the Ottoman Army was not ready to use its few new aircraft in battle. The Ottomans had very few troops in North Africa and countered the Italians mostly with organized local Arab militia (a massive Italian amphibious assault force of 150,000 troops had to be countered by 20,000 Bedouins and 8,000 Turks.) The British government, which militarily controlled the de jure Ottoman provinces of Egypt and Sudan since the Urabi Revolt in 1882, didn't allow the Ottoman government to send additional troops to Libya through Egypt. There were attempts to purchase aircraft from France and send them to Libya via Algeria, but they did not materialize.

== Balkan Wars ==
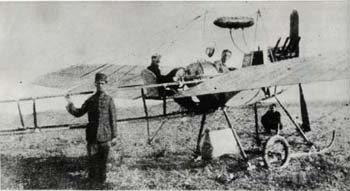
Ottoman pilots during the Balkan Wars (1912–1913)

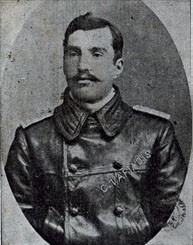
Nuri Bey, one of the first Ottoman aviators

The Ottoman military aircraft saw their first active combat involvement during the First Balkan War, against the Balkan countries of Montenegro, Serbia, Bulgaria and Greece. Seventeen Ottoman aircraft were used for reconnaissance, from September 1912 to October 1913. The Ottoman military aviation, due to the organization's inexperience in combat, initially lost a number of airplanes. However, as the pilots hardened with battle experience, they improved their combat skills, and many new recruits applied to join the aviation squadrons.

Nevertheless, the Balkan League won the war. A short while later, Bulgaria attacked Greece and Serbia to kick off the Second Balkan War, and the Ottoman Empire declared war on Bulgaria, thus recovering a portion of its lost territories in Eastern Thrace, including the major city of Adrianople.

By the end of the Balkan Wars, the fledgling Ottoman military aviation had already been through three wars and a coup d'état.

With the end of the Balkan Wars, a modernization process started and new planes were purchased. With the outbreak of the First World War, the modernization process stopped abruptly.

== Pre-World War I ==
On 29 October 1913, Captain Salim Bey and Captain Kemal Bey flew over the Sea of Marmara; and on 18 November 1913, Belkıs Şevket Hanım, a member of the Society for the Defense of Women's Rights (Mudafaa-i Hukuki Nisvan Cemiyeti) flew in the aircraft piloted by Fethi Bey, becoming the first Turkish female aircraft passenger.

=== Istanbul–Cairo expedition of 1914 ===
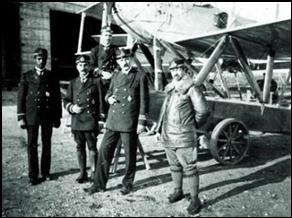
Ottoman naval aviators of the Naval Flight School at Yeşilköy

Following the Balkan Wars, the government of the Ottoman Empire launched a prestigious expedition across the empire's holdings. A multiple-leg flight of four air force monoplanes from Istanbul to Cairo and Alexandria in Egypt, it would cover a distance of nearly 2,500 km (1,600 mi). The planes left Istanbul from the Aviation School in Hagios Stefanos (modern Yeşilköy) on 8 February manned by two aviators each.

The first team's aircraft, a Blériot XI, crashed on 27 February on the flight leg from Damascus to Jerusalem at Al-Samra near the Sea of Galilee, killing pilot Navy Lieutenant (Ottoman Turkish: Bahriye Yüzbaşısı) Fethi Bey and his navigator, Artillery First Lieutenant (Ottoman Turkish: Topçu Mülazım-ı Ula) Sadık Bey. The second team's aircraft, a Deperdussin B, crashed on 11 March into the Mediterranean Sea off Jaffa shortly after take-off. Artillery Second Lieutenant (Ottoman Turkish: Topçu Mülazım-ı Saniye) Nuri Bey was killed while the other aviator, İsmail Hakkı Bey, survived the accident.

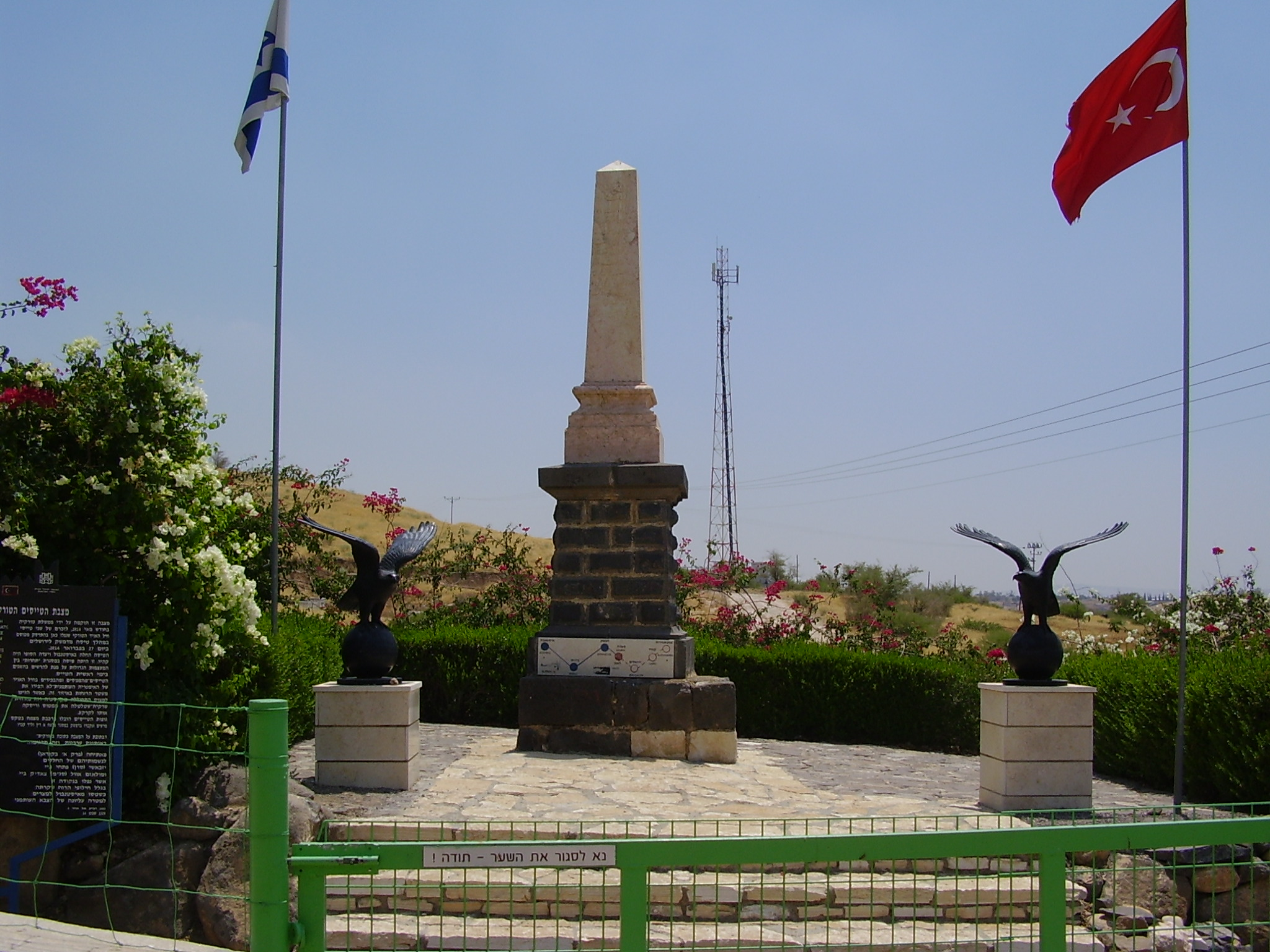
The monument at the crash site near Al-Samra, the Sea of Galilee in Israel

All three victims were interred in Damascus. A monument was erected at the crash site near the Sea of Galilee. Another memorial monument was erected in Istanbul.

== World War I ==
=== Structure and organization ===
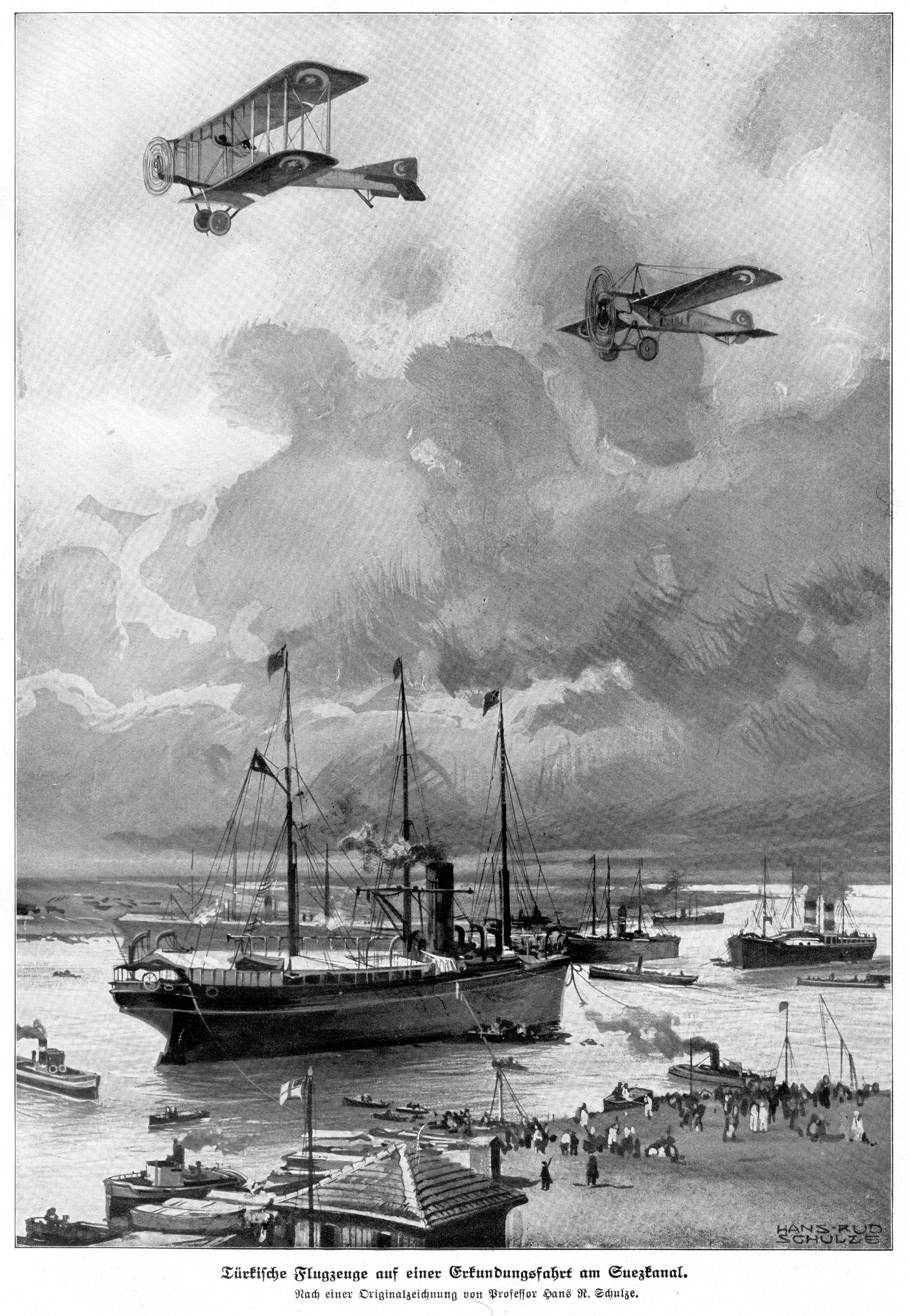
Ottoman aircraft on a reconnaissance trip along the Suez Canal in 1914 by Hans R. Schulze

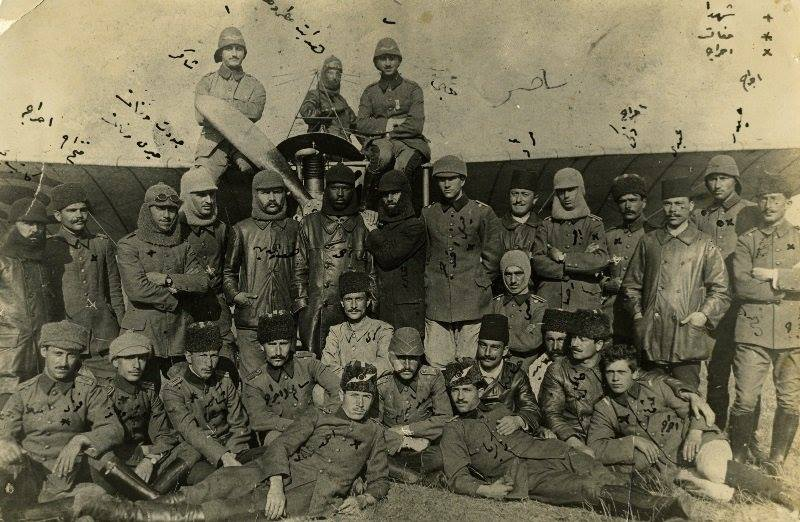
Ottoman pilots in 1915 next to a Blériot XI-2 monoplane

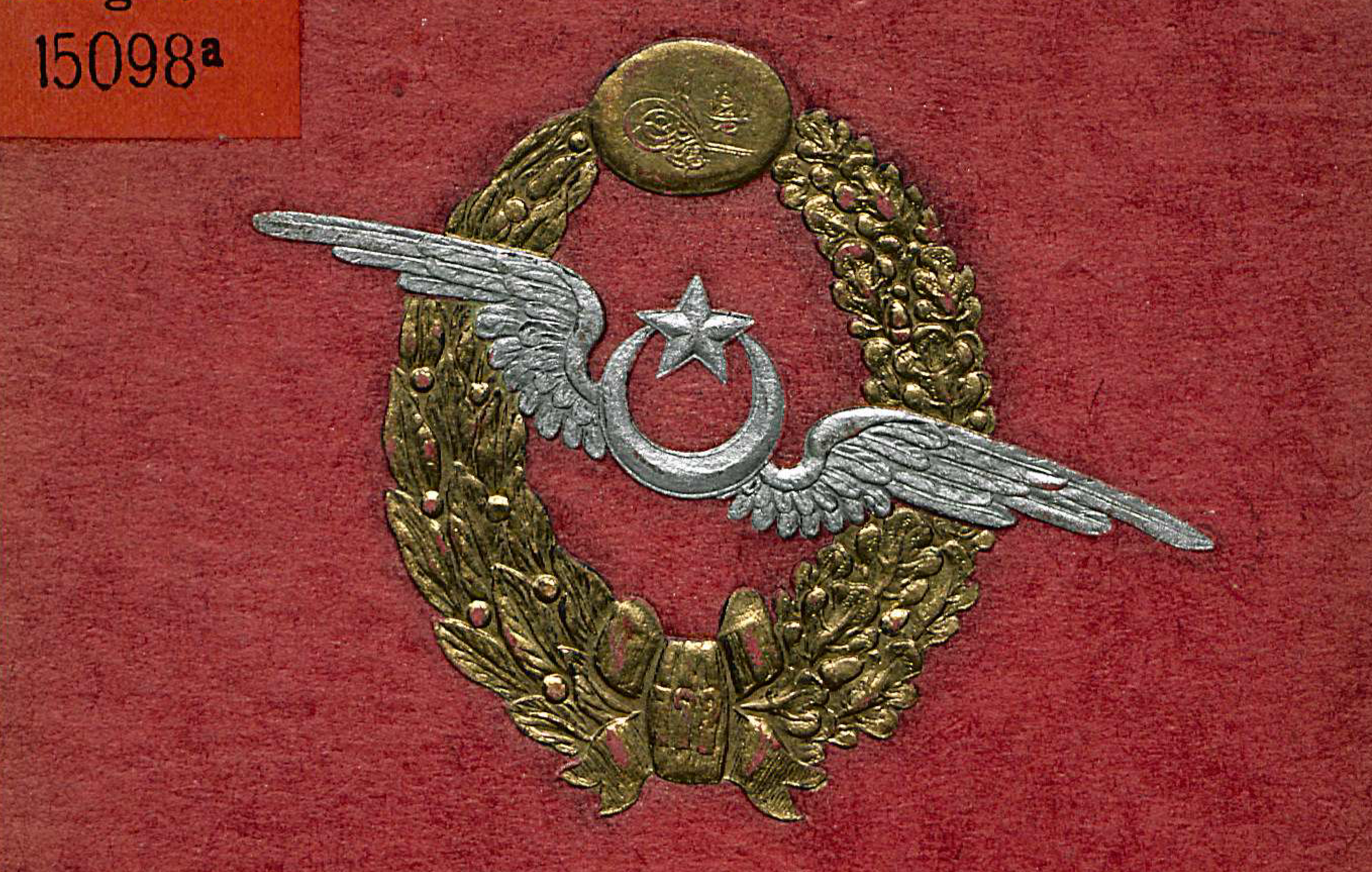
Aviator badge of the Empire

The Ottoman aviation squadrons began World War I under direct control of the Office of the Supreme Military Command (Başkomutanlık Vekâleti). Because of the cost of aircraft, it was a small unit. It would remain there for the duration of the war, never becoming a separate corps as in other World War I armies. Instead, it was parceled out in small detachments to an army or corps which directed the tactical use of the planes. Primitive logistics kept the units small.

Meanwhile, in June 1914, the Ottoman Navy established the Naval Aircraft School (Bahriye Tayyare Mektebi) in San Stefano.

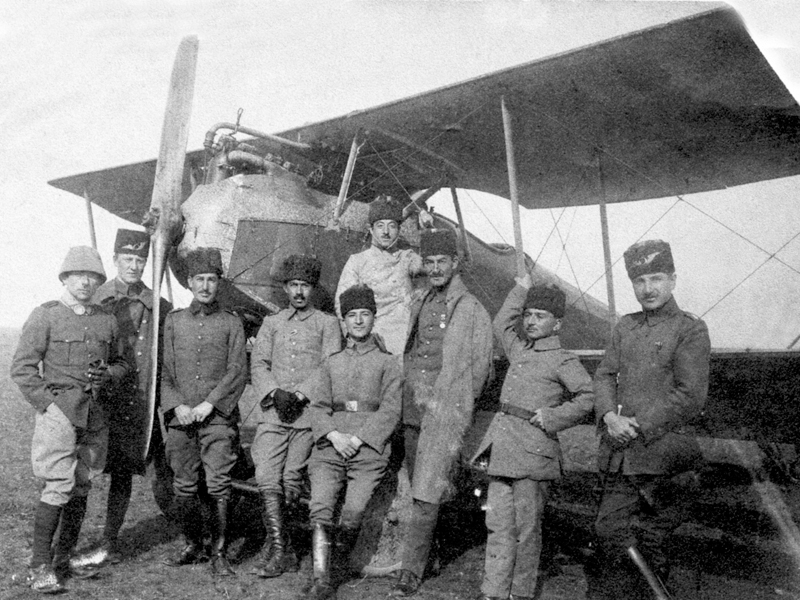
A Halberstadt D.III of the Ottoman 15th Fighter Flight Squadron during the Gallipoli Campaign

In 1915, some German officers came to the Ottoman Empire, such as Hans Joachim Buddecke, and some Ottoman officers went to Germany for flight education. Buddecke himself would achieve some success flying for the Ottoman allies of Germany, achieving four confirmed and seven probable victories (from late 1915 to the summer of 1916) while flying for the Ottoman aviation squadrons.

By the end of 1915, two offices were established to govern Ottoman military aviation. The 13th Branch was part of the Ottoman General Staff; the 9th Branch was part of the Minister of War's office.

By 1916, the growing air force had 81 pilots and observers and about 90 airplanes. Eventually, Germany would transfer 460 airplanes to the Ottoman Empire; some 260 went to the Ottoman units and the rest remained in German units. Some 400 German aviation personnel served in Ottoman forces.

By the war's end, the Ottoman aviation squadrons had become a potpourri of about 200 supplied, purchased, and captured aircraft from Germany, France, Russia, and Britain. Even a general enumeration was overwhelming: seven types of Albatros; four types of Fokkers; three types of Gothas; two types each of Rumpler and Caudron; plus LVG B series, Halberstadts, Pfalzes, Voisins, de Havillands, Nieuports, a Bristol Scout, a Farman, a Morane-Saulnier L Parasol, and a Grigorovich G.5 and many others.

Efforts were made to reorganize the Ottoman aviation squadrons, but this ended in 1918 with the end of the First World War and the Occupation of Istanbul by Allied Forces on 13 November 1918.

=== Operations ===
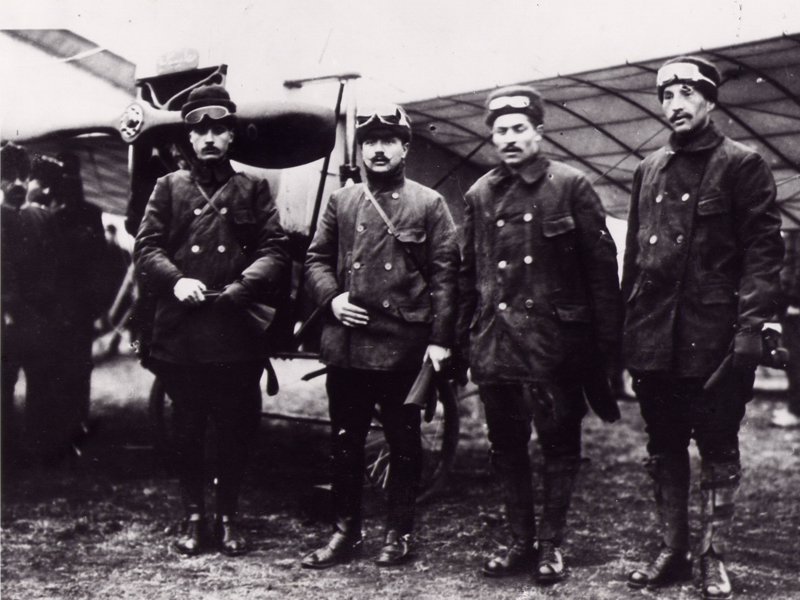
1914 Istanbul-Cairo flight, left to right: Sadık Bey, İsmail Hakkı Bey, Fethi Bey and Nuri Bey

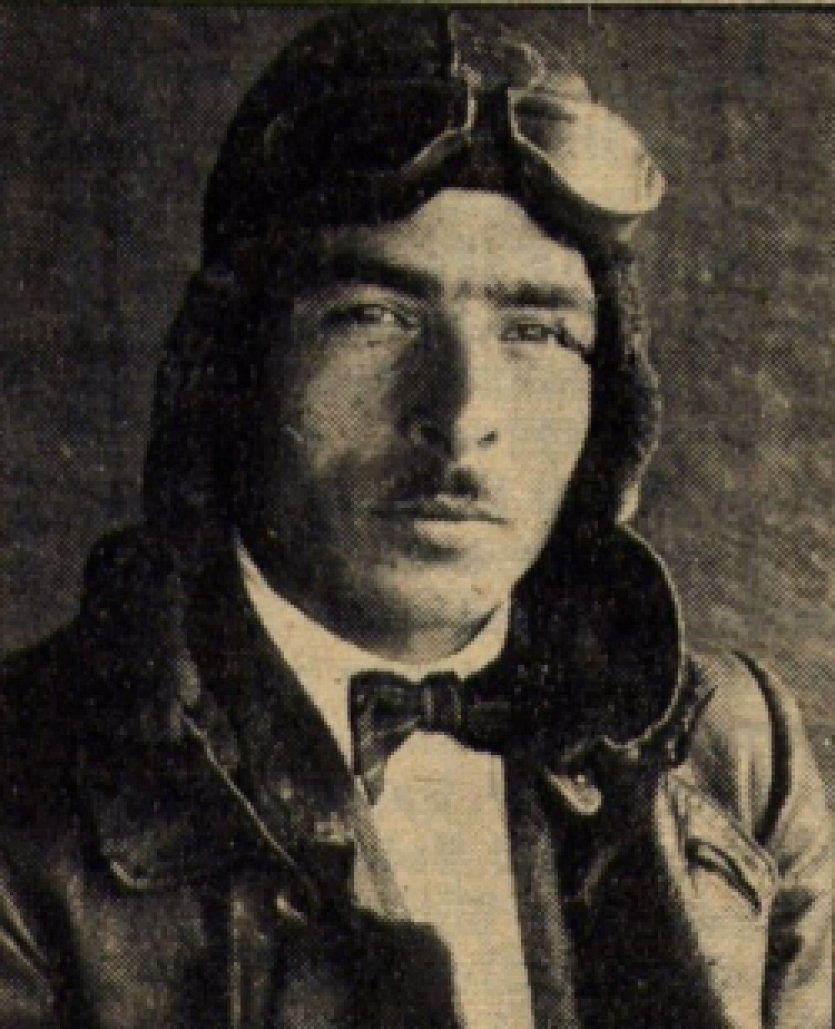
Vecihi Hürkuş was the first civil aviator of Turkey

In August 1914, the Ottoman military aviation had eight planes assigned for operations and four in the flight school in San Stefano; of six operational planes, two were sent to eastern Anatolia, with the others retained at the flying school.

Major Erich Serno arrived in January 1915, accompanied by a staff of twelve. It was Erich Serno who convinced the Ottoman military leadership to give the pilots a distinct uniform (a winged crescent and star on their hats.) These men were parceled out to Ottoman detachments to fill out shortages in trained Ottoman personnel. Other German air personnel were later supplied. The augmentation became so extreme that one of the seven detachments formed by the end of 1915 was wholly German, although they wore Ottoman uniforms. Total Ottoman personnel in these seven detachments were 11 observers and seven army pilots, three navy pilots, and three civilian pilots.

The most important 1915 operation of the Ottoman aircraft detachments was the surveillance of the Gallipoli landing. This was performed by two detachments which was later reinforced. Ottoman airplanes from Gelibolu (Gallipoli) also attacked Allied and Greek naval targets and bases throughout Northern Aegean.

The Ottoman aviation squadrons deployed to fronts of Gallipoli, Mesopotamia, Western Thrace, Istanbul area and Caucasus in late 1915.

The fleet size reached its apex in December 1916, when the Ottoman aviation squadrons had 90 airplanes.

The "Aviation Squadrons" were reorganized as the "General Inspectorate of Air Forces" (Kuva-yı Havaiye Müfettiş-i Umumiliği) on 29 July 1918.

In the summer of 1918, the Palestine Brigade of the Royal Air Force and the Australian Flying Corps pressured the Ottoman and German reconnaissance and combat aircraft detachments in Palestine. The Ottoman forces, lacking the information to fend off Allenby's offensives around Megiddo, found themselves under heavy air attack while retreating from their rout.

With the signing of the Armistice of Mudros on 30 October 1918, the Ottoman military aviation effectively came to an end. At the time of the armistice, the Ottoman military aviation had around 100 pilots; 17 land-based airplane companies (4 planes each); and 3 seaplane companies (4 planes each); totalling 80 aircraft.

== See also ==
- Turkish Air Force
- Aviation Martyrs' Monument

== Bibliography ==
- Ordered to Die: A History of the Ottoman Army in the First World War. Edward J. Erickson. Greenwood Publishing Group, 2001.
- Coalition Warfare: An Uneasy Accord. Keith Neilson, et al. Wilfrid Laurier University Press, 1983.
- The Arab Revolt 1916–18: Lawrence set Arabia ablaze. David Murphy. 2008.
