= Vecihi K-VI =

First Turkish-built aircraft

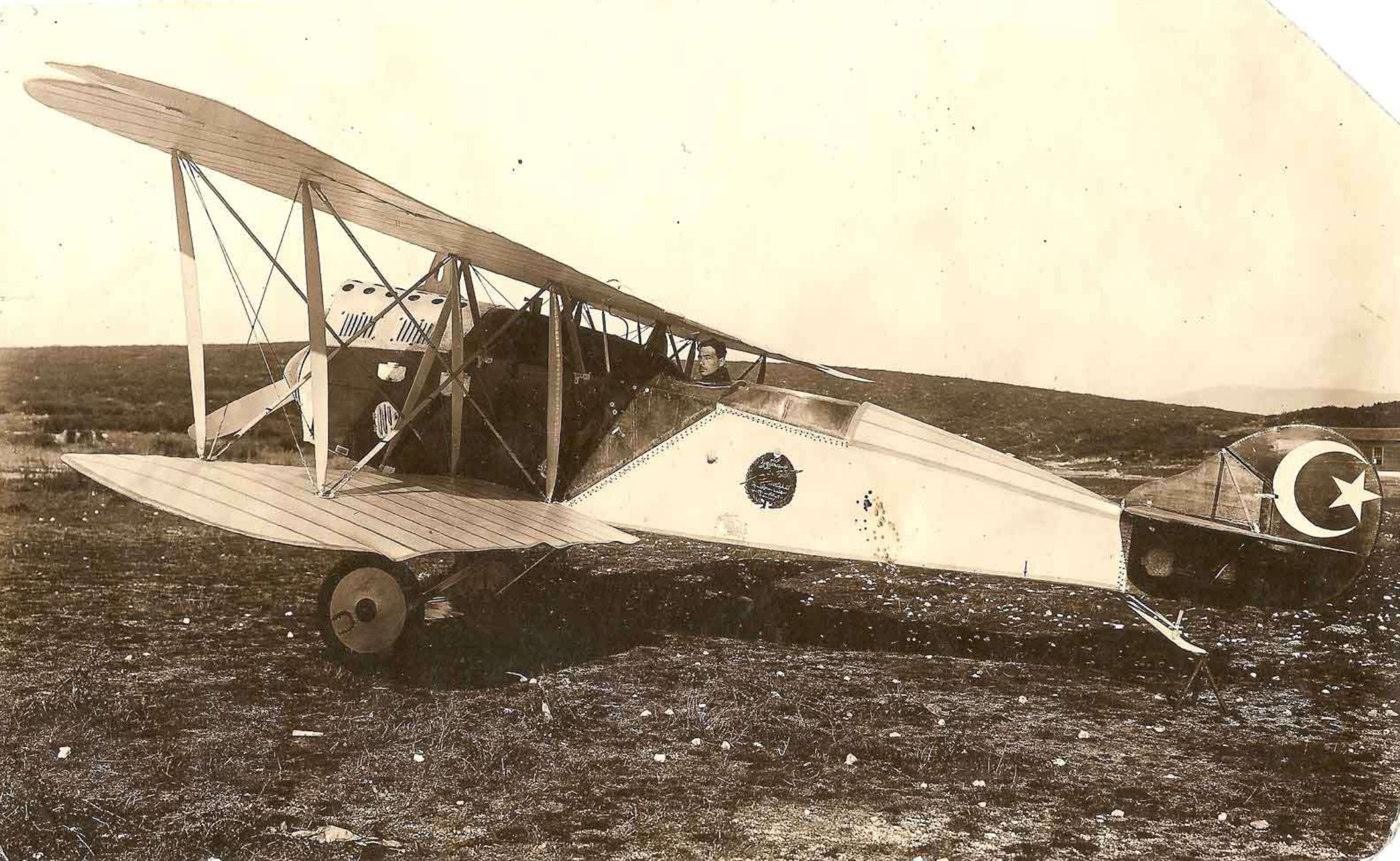
- The plane in January 1925

General information
- Type: Training and reconnaissance
- National origin: Turkey
- Designer: Vecihi Hürkuş
- Status: Destroyed
- Number built: 1

History
- First flight: 28 January 1925
- Last flight: 28 January 1925

Vecihi K-VI (full name: Vecihi K-VI Training and Reconnaissance Aircraft (Note: Turkish: Vecihi K-VI Eğitim ve Keşif Uçağı)) was a Turkish training and reconnaissance aircraft, and the first aircraft built by the nation. Designed by aviator Vecihi Hürkuş in 1923 after a lack of planes in the Turkish Air Force during the Turkish War of Independence, the plane was completed with the help of his friends only in late 1924. Despite not receiving a flight permit due to lack of qualified personnel in the committee that was supposed to certify the plane, Hürkuş flew the K-VI for the first time in January 1925, for which he received a jail sentence. He was later pardoned but left the air force following the decision. He made unsuccessful attempts to get the plane back and the Vecihi K-VI was eventually destroyed under unknown circumstances.

== Development and production ==
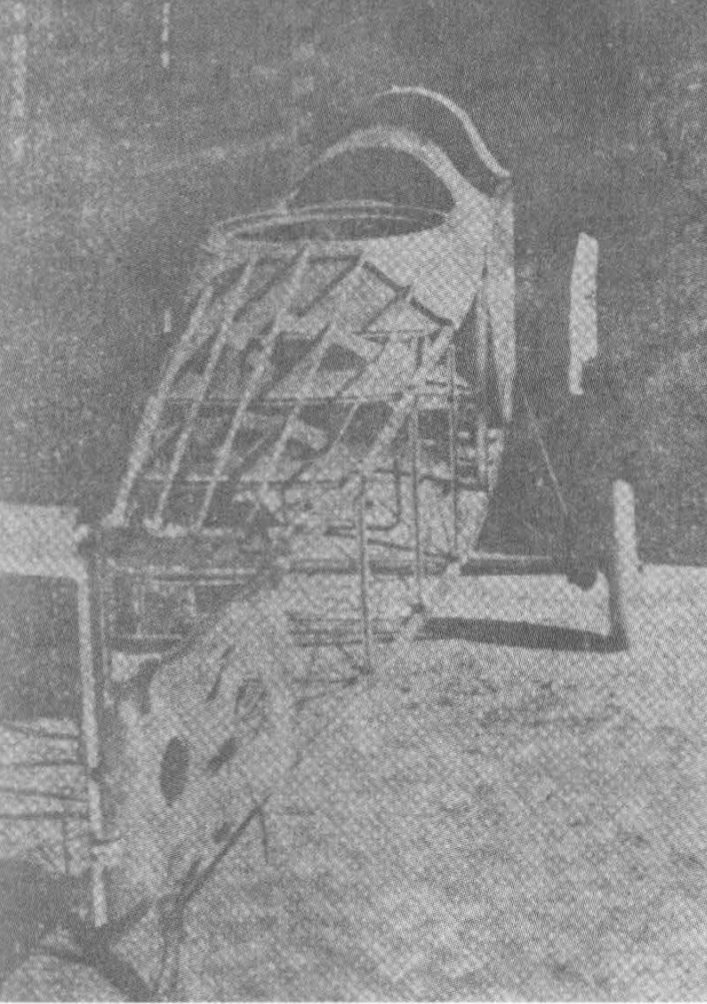
The Vecihi K-VI during its production, c. 1924

During the 1919–1923 Turkish War of Independence, the Turkish Air Force lacked aircraft. Vecihi Hürkuş, an aviator participating in the war, wanted the country to have its own aircraft. In a 1925 interview with Resimli Ay, Hürkuş said that he was hesitant about building a plane at first, but that he was convinced by his friends. He worked to make a design that was simple and had similar specifications to airplanes already in use. On 14 June 1923, Hürkuş finished the technical drawings of the plane, which was to be used for training and reconnaissance purposes. He showed the project to lieutenant general Muzaffer Ergüder, an inspector in the air force, three days later on 17 June. After inspecting the drawings, Ergüder congratulated Hürkuş and suggested that the plane should be called "Vecihi". The air force set out three conditions that had to be met: the plane was easy to assemble, had a top speed of over 200 kilometres per hour (110 kn), and allowed the pilot to have a wide field of view.

After the plane was approved by the air force, Hürkuş and four of his friends started to build the plane at the Halkapınar Aircraft Repair Workshop. Work started on 24 June. Having a limited budget, the engine of Vecihi K-VI was taken from a Hellenic Air Force plane, as many enemy aircraft and their parts captured during the war were kept by the Turkish Air Force. For the rest of the plane, Hürkuş used wood, steel rods, and fabric sourced from Turkey. Aircraft dope was used to strengthen the fabric. Hürkuş spent at least 16 hours a day working on the plane, sometimes sleeping less than two hours to finish the project. He was briefly sent away from December 1923 to April 1924 to study European aviation. By the time he returned, the wooden frame was finished, and only had to be covered with fabric. The Vecihi K-VI was constructed in a total of 14 months and was completed by late 1924.

== Operational history ==
=== Maiden flight ===
After the plane was finished, it was moved to the Seydiköy Airfield where engine and taxiing tests took place. Hürkuş asked for a flying permit, and a technical committee was formed to certify the plane. However, this committee lacked qualified personnel to fly the plane. Hürkuş waited almost a month for a team to inspect the plane. One of the members later told Hürkuş that they could not give him the license, and said that he "should hop in and fly if he trusts [his] plane". On 28 January 1925, Hürkuş arrived at the airfield, which was completely empty. At 15:00 local time, Hürkuş took off after a short roll and made a 15-minute flight with Vecihi K-VI. In the back seat, there was a sand bag of 60 kilograms (130 lb) to simulate a second pilot. This was the first flight ever to use a Turkish-built plane. By the time he came back, the airfield was filled with a crowd who were cheering for him. After landing, Hürkuş was greeted by his celebrating friends.

=== Subsequent history ===
Hürkuş was talking to his friends about the flight after the plane was towed to the hangar when he was notified that he had received a short jail sentence (Note: Exact number differs depending on source. Anadolu Agency, based on Hürkuş's interview in 1925, claims 10 days, while Hürkuş in his own book writes that it was 15 days.) as he had neglected the orders of the inspectorship by flying without a permit. While the decision was later overturned, he left the air force and the plane remained unused. The plane was stored out in the open in İzmir where it was subject to corrosion. Hürkuş tried to get the K-VI back, but he was only "met with lingering". His requests to store the plane in an indoor area were also declined by the air force. The Turkish Aeronautical Association (TTaC) officially requested to use the plane for flights aimed to gather donations for the association, but the plane was never given to them. Following some managerial changes in the TTaC in September 1925, Hürkuş learned that it was impossible to get his plane back. The Vecihi K-VI was later destroyed under unknown circumstances.

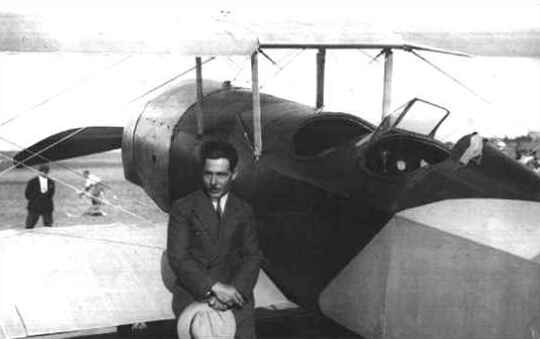
Hürkuş with his second aircraft, the Vecihi K-XIV, which completed its maiden flight on 16 September 1930

In 1930, Hürkuş built a second aircraft named the Vecihi K-XIV which he flew for the first time on 16 September 1930. The K-XIV was sent to Prague, Czechoslovakia by train in February 1931 to get certified. The process was completed on 23 April and the certified plane was flown back to Turkey on 5 May.

== Specifications ==
Data from Yavuz 2012, p. 26.

General characteristics

- Capacity: 2
- Length: 7.61 m (25 ft 0 in)
- Wingspan: 11.7 m (38 ft 5 in)
- Height: 3 m (9 ft 10 in)
- Wing area: 31.8 m^{2} (342 sq ft)
- Empty weight: 830 kg (1,830 lb)
- Gross weight: 1,270 kg (2,800 lb)
- Fuel capacity: 200
- Powerplant: 1 × Benz 6-cyl. water-cooled piston engine, 150 kW (200 hp)
- Propellers: 2.85 m (9 ft 4 in) diameter

Performance

- Maximum speed: 207 km/h (129 mph, 112 kn)
- Cruise speed: 188 km/h (117 mph, 102 kn)
- Stall speed: 83 km/h (52 mph, 45 kn)
