= Fesa Evrensev =

Turkish aviator (1878–1951)

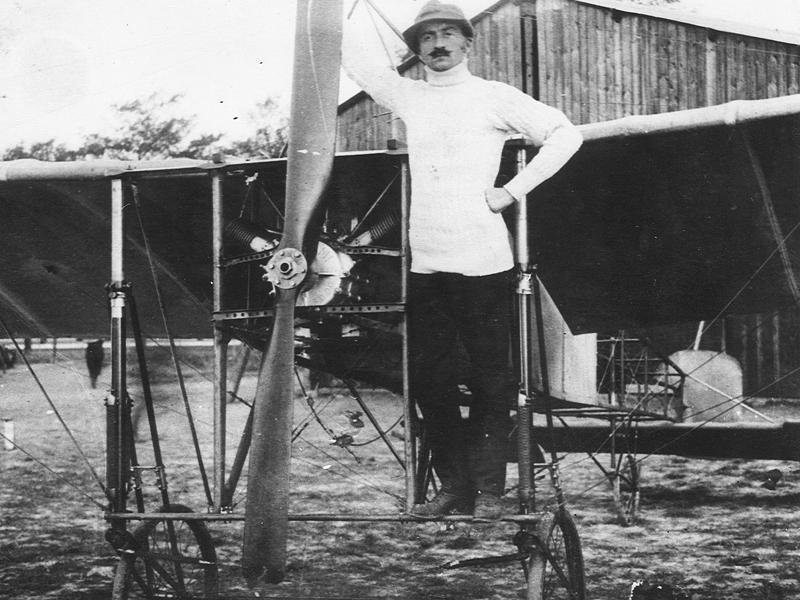
- Evrensev in 1911
- Born: 1878; Gedikpaşa, Istanbul, Ottoman Empire
- Died: 9 April 1951 (aged 72–73); Istanbul, Turkey
- Burial place: Karacaahmet Cemetery
- Military career
- Allegiance: Ottoman Empire; Turkey
- Branch: Ottoman Aviation Squadrons; Turkish Air Force
- Conflicts: Balkan Wars; World War I; War of Independence
- Other work: Member of the Turkish Aeronautical Association

Mehmet Fesa Evrensev (1878 – 9 April 1951) was a Turkish aircraft pilot and aviator, known as the first Ottoman pilot and first general manager of the Turkish State Airline. Evrensev graduated from the Turkish Military Academy in 1899 as a lieutenant and spent his early military career in the cavalry. In 1911, following a series of exams, Evrensev and Yusuf Kenan Bey were selected to become the first pilots of the Ottoman Army. They were sent to the Blériot Aéronautique flight school on 9 July and completed their training in February and March 1912, respectively. When they returned, the army had started setting up its own flight school, in which they would be the first instructors. During the opening day of the school on 26 April, Evrensev made his first flight as a certified pilot, becoming the first Turk to do so. During the Balkan Wars, Evrensev was active in Thrace, conducting reconnaissance flights from Thessaloniki.

Evrensev was ordered to participate in the Caucasus campaign during World War I, but his ship was sunk by the Russians in October 1914 and he became a prisoner of war. He was imprisoned in a camp in Siberia, from which he escaped in 1917, making his way to Moscow aboard freight trains. He returned to the Ottoman Empire in 1920 after encountering a group of Turkish soldiers there. During the Turkish War of Independence, he served on the Western front. He retired from the military in 1925 and later became the first general manager of the Turkish State Airline. In 1942, he joined the Turkish Aeronautical Association. After suffering from health problems such as tuberculosis originating in the poor conditions in the Russian camp, Evrensev died on 9 April 1951. 26 April was designated World Pilots' Day in 2014 in honour of his first flight. The date was already recognized as Pilot's Day by the Turkish Airline Pilots Association in 2000.

== Early and personal life ==
Mehmet Fesa Bey (Note: Standard naming convention in the Ottoman Empire and early Turkish Republic until the Surname Law of 1934. "Mehmet Fesa" is the given name, and there is no surname. "Bey" is used to note the gender.) was born in 1878 in Gedikpaşa, Istanbul, Ottoman Empire. After finishing his primary education in Istanbul, he attended the Galatasaray High School in 1887 for ten years and switched to the Turkish Military Academy in 1897. He graduated two years later in 1899 as a lieutenant in the cavalry.

Evrensev married Gül Hanım before World War I and had two children. In 1922, he married Hatice Sabiha Hanım and had four daughters.

In addition to Turkish and English, he was also a fluent speaker of French, Greek and Arabic.

== Military career ==
Following his graduation, Evrensev was sent to the Davutpaşa Barracks in Istanbul, which was determined by lot. While in the cavalry, he spent 97 days in jail and was later sent to Erzincan in exile. Following the start of the Second Constitutional Era in 1908, Evrensev was pardoned and returned to the cavalry in Istanbul as the commander of the fifth company in the first regiment. He spent the first ten years in the military as a regular lieutenant in several missions and was later promoted to a captain.

=== Flight training ===
In February 1911, the Ottoman Army announced that it would send two people to a European flight school. The two pilots would be decided by a series of exams. The first exam was taken by 80 people, with number of attendees decreasing after every exam. Ten took the final one; Evrensev and Senior Lieutenant Yusuf Kenan Bey got the two highest scores, 92 and 91, respectively. The two went through a medical check and were cleared to be sent abroad. The army initially wanted to send them to Germany, but due to France having more advanced technology at the time and lower costs, they were sent to the flight school of Blériot Aéronautique on 9 July.

Evrensev completed his training on 19 February 1912 and became the first licensed Turkish pilot. Yusuf Kenan completed his training a month later. Around the same time, the army planned to open its own flight school, for which it bought two aircraft. In March, Evrensev and Kenan Bey were requested to return to Istanbul by a lieutenant colonel to take delivery of these aircraft, which they did on 20 April. The two became the first instructors of the school. The aircraft were moved to San Stefano. British pilot Charles Gordon Bell came to Istanbul to attend a ceremony at the school with his R.E.P. airplane. On the morning of 26 April, Bell flew several times in front of high-ranking Ottoman officers, including a flight over the Sea of Marmara. Later that day, Evrensev made his own flight with a Deperdussin airplane, the first flight by a certified Turkish pilot.

=== Participation in wars and capture by Russians ===
When the Balkan Wars started in October 1912, Evrensev was still an instructor at the flight school. A crew consisting of some Ottoman and French pilots and technicians—including Evrensev—were sent to Thessaloniki by train, arriving on 14 October. The Balkan Wars were the first time the Ottoman Army used aircraft in combat, with Evrensev and his crew conducting many reconnaissance flights over Thrace. After the Greek Army advanced into the city, the crew burnt its aircraft to deny their use to the Greeks and hid in the homes of Turks living in the area. Evrensev escaped to İzmir on a ferry and later returned to Istanbul. He made another reconnaissance flight on 22 February 1913 as part of the Second Battle of Çatalca. Evrensev was the commander of the air corps in Thrace. Throughout July, he was involved in a series of flights around the area, most notably assisting in the liberation of Edirne. Following the war, he was part of the first Ottoman formation flight on 13 November from Istanbul to Edirne.

Evrensev was sent to participate in the Caucasus campaign during World War I. The ship he boarded was sunk by the Russians on 24 October 1914 off the coast of Amasra in the Black Sea. He was made a prisoner of war and subsequently sent to camp in Siberia. While in the camp, he taught people to make clothes from calico that was used to send supplies. He was trusted by the guards and was allowed to be the personal driver of a Russian general. Aided by the chaos created in the country due to the October Revolution, he escaped in 1917. Evrensev made his way to Moscow by riding freight trains. While begging at the Red Square, he spotted a group of Turkish soldiers, whom he identified by their clothes. Upon identifying himself, the commander of the group told Evrensev that he was presumed to have died.

He stayed with the group for three weeks. When the group was working on returning some of its equipment to the Ottoman Empire, Evrensev said that he could travel across the Black Sea aboard a taka if he was allowed to go to Crimea. He managed to convince the commander and sailed across the sea alone in a small taka. He arrived at Trabzon on 14 June 1920. After he recounted his story to a commander, he was restored to his former rank of captain. During the Turkish War of Independence, he was stationed at the Western front, and was later promoted to major during the war.

=== Later military career and retirement ===
Evrensev was a part of the group that included aviation pioneer Vecihi Hürkuş that was asked to tour Europe to study European aviation. They left İzmir on a ferry on 20 December 1923 and arrived in Marseille, France, eight days later. They first visited the factory of Chantiers Aéro-Maritimes de la Seine and later other factories, as well as a return to Blériot Aéronautique. They left the country in February for Italy, and traveled to Germany that same month. The group toured Great Britain from March to May, during which Evrensev also met a British general that he had known from his time at the flight school in France. He continued to be an inspector and instructor in the Air Force in İzmir until his retirement from the military on 18 November 1925 as a major.

== Civil career and later life ==
From 1925 to 1933, Evrensev worked in the Air Force Undersecretary. In the early 1930s, he was involved in the creation of the first Turkish airline, the Turkish State Airline, present-day Turkish Airlines. He was appointed as the first general manager of the airline on 3 June 1933, a position which he held until 13 June 1934. He joined the Turkish Aeronautical Association in 1942 and served as a translator for Polish and Russian technicians in the association as well as its foreign visitors.

Evrensev's health worsened in the final ten years of his life, mainly due to the poor conditions he was subjected to in the Siberian camp. In 1943, he was diagnosed with lung tuberculosis and spent three months in the Heybeliada sanatorium. In September 1947, he was treated at a military hospital due to symptoms such as fatigue and coughing, and was put on leave for three months. He retired from the Turkish Aeronautical Association in 1950. Mehmet Fesa Evrensev died on 9 April 1951 and was buried at the Karacaahmet Cemetery.

== Legacy ==
Evrensev was a recipient of the silver Liakat Medal, the Medal of Independence and the Fifth Class Order of the Medjidie for his service in the military.

In 2000, the Turkish Airline Pilots Association designated 26 April as Pilot's Day in honour of the first flight by Evrensev. That year, it was celebrated by the Turkish Air Force. In 2013, the International Federation of Air Line Pilots' Associations decided to create a World Pilots' Day, and picked 26 April because it was "a day that saw a prominent figure in aviation history taking to the sky for the first time". Since 2014, the World Pilots' Day has been celebrated internationally on 26 April.
