= Vecihi Hürkuş =

Turkish aviator and engineer (1896–1969)

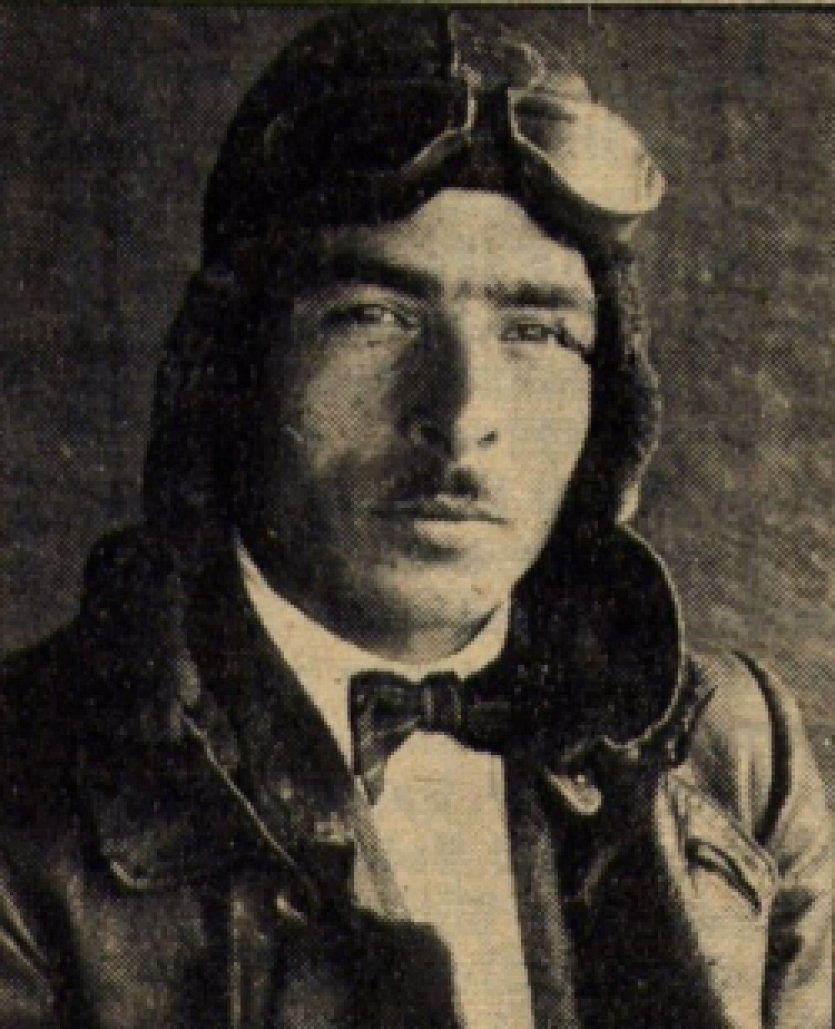
- Hürkuş in the 1930s
- Born: 6 January 1896; Arnavutköy, Istanbul, Ottoman Empire
- Died: 16 July 1969 (aged 73); Gülhane Military Medical Academy, Ankara, Turkey
- Burial place: Cebeci Asri Cemetery
- Military career
- Allegiance: Ottoman Empire; Turkey
- Branch: Ottoman Aviation Squadrons; Turkish Air Force
- Rank: First Sergeant
- Units: 7th Airplane Company; 9th Airplane Company
- Conflicts: Balkan Wars; First World War; Turkish War of Independence
- Other work: Member of the Turkish Aeronautical Association

Vecihi Hürkuş (6 January 1896 – 16 July 1969) was a Turkish fighter pilot, aviation engineer and aviation pioneer. He built Turkey's first aircraft, the Vecihi K-VI, and founded the first civil flight school of the nation.

Born in Istanbul, Hürkuş graduated from the Tophane Art School and later joined the Ottoman Army in the Balkan Wars in 1912. Upon his return from the wars, he became the commander of a prisoner-of-war camp in Beykoz. In 1914, he was sent to Baghdad as a mechanic in the Mesopotamia campaign. He was sent back to Istanbul in 1916 after suffering minor injuries in a crash. He was trained to become a pilot and, together with Captain Şükrü Koçak, became one of the first two Turkish pilots to shoot down another plane. He was taken prisoner by Russian forces in 1917 after making an emergency landing and was confined in a camp in Nargin, from which he escaped in 1918. During the Turkish War of Independence, he was a pilot involved in bombing Greek forces and a minor friendly fire incident.

After the war, Hürkuş started to work on building his own aircraft, which became Turkey's first aircraft. He was given a jail sentence for flying the plane without a permit. Although the sentence was later suspended, it caused him to leave the air force to join the Turkish Aircraft Society (TTaC), where he handed out leaflets of the TTaC after demonstration flights. In 1930, Hürkuş built his second aircraft, the Vecihi K-XIV, and had it transported to Czechoslovakia to get it certified. He used the plane to fly domestically to introduce aviation, hold conferences and collect donations for the TTaC, which he later left after his assistant was fired.

He founded his own flight school in 1932 and trained several students, including Bedriye Tahir Gökmen. The school was shut down in 1934 by the Müdafaa-i Milliye Vekâleti. On 27 February 1939, he received a diploma in aircraft engineering from the Weimar Engineering School in Germany. In the 1940s, Hürkuş started writing books and publishing a magazine. He founded an airline in 1954, which was later banned from flying. He died on 16 July 1969 in Ankara and was buried at the Cebeci Asri Cemetery. Hürkuş was the recipient of three commendations from the Grand National Assembly of Turkey and the Medal of Independence. Hürkuş and Hürjet are named after him.

== Early and personal life ==
Vecihi Hürkuş was born on 6 January 1896 in Akıntıburnu, Arnavutköy, Istanbul, to customs officer Faham Bey and Zeliya Nihir Hanım. His father died when he was three years old. He went to the Üsküdar Paşakapısı primary school, followed by the Tophane Art School due to his interest in the subject. During the Turkish War of Independence, Hürkuş married Hadiye Hanım, the daughter of the chief of police in Akşehir. They had two daughters. He later married his childhood love İhsan Hanım, with whom he had another daughter. In 1950, he married Hadiye again. Before the Surname Law, Hürkuş was called "Vecihi Feham" due to the name of his father, though he signed his planes as "Vecihi Kartal" throughout the 1930s. After the Surname Law, he first changed his surname to "Türküş", before altering it to Hürkuş in 1949.

His niece, Eribe Hürkuş, was one of Turkey's first female aviators. She was killed while parachuting during the Republic Day celebrations on 29 October 1936. She was the first female aviation martyr of Turkey.

== Military career ==
=== Balkan Wars and World War I ===
In 1912, he joined his uncle, Colonel Kemal Bey, as a volunteer in the Balkan Wars, and was sent to Edirne. After the war, he was assigned as the commander of a camp holding prisoners-of-war in Beykoz. He was influenced by pilots who died after traveling to Egypt and initially built model planes. Hürkuş wanted to become a pilot himself, but he was considered to be too young. Instead, he attended an aircraft mechanics school, where he learned about airplanes for the first time.

In 1914, after World War I started, Hürkuş was sent to Baghdad during the Mesopotamia campaign as a mechanic. On 12 February 1916, he made a reconnaissance flight near modern-day Palestine with another pilot, senior lieutenant Mehmet Ali. During the flight, their plane stalled and crashed. Mehmet Ali had to have a leg amputated, while Hürkuş was left in critical condition and was sent to Istanbul. After his treatment, Hürkuş attended an aviation school in Yeşilköy and became a pilot himself. He joined 7th Airplane Company (Tayyare Bölüğü) in December 1916 as a non-commissioned officer. He and captain Şükrü Koçak are credited with shooting down a Russian aircraft in combat on 26 September 1917, which is considered the first in Turkish aviation history.

During the Caucasus campaign, Hürkuş was wounded in a dogfight on 8 October 1917 after making a tactical mistake by not using his altitude advantage over his opponent, causing him to make an emergency landing in Erzurum. Realizing that he was going to be taken as a prisoner by Russians, he burned his plane to not hand it over. He was taken to and held captive at a prisoner-of-war camp in Nargin, but later escaped with the help of Azerbaijanis, and returned to Istanbul on 13 May 1918 via Iran. He joined the 9th Airplane Company, tasked with defending the airspace of Istanbul, after his return. He was discharged from the military following the end of the war.

=== Turkish War of Independence ===
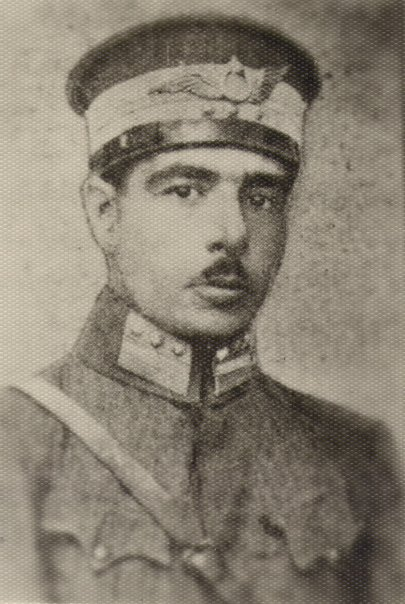
Portrait of Hürkuş during the Turkish War of Independence

During the Turkish War of Independence, Hürkuş flew and maintained several aircraft. In June 1920, he and a few aviator friends stole a plane from occupied Istanbul to join the Kuva-yi Milliye in Anatolia. This was unsuccessful after the plane crashed due to being overweight. He joined the aircraft station in Konya as a pilot, and he made reconnaissance and assault flights from there in support of the Turkish Army.

On 20 August 1920, he made a reconnaissance flight together with another aircraft near Simav. They were returning to the base after flying low over a valley, when Hürkuş spotted a military camp near Kelemyenice, and decided to drop a bomb as the tents of the camp were coloured gray. The camp was of Kuva-yi Seyyare, a part of the Turkish forces, who sent a telegraph less than an hour after Hürkuş landed at Uşak, reporting that they had been bombed but did not have any casualties, and requested Turkish aircraft to respond. Shocked by his mistake, Hürkuş offered to do what the Kuva-yi Seyyare had asked. They took off again the same day, and arrived at Demirci after 40 minutes, where they spotted two camps: one south and one north-east of the city. He dropped two bombs before returning to Uşak. The next morning, the Kuva-yi Seyyare attacked the weakened Greek forces around Demirci.

In late March 1921, Hürkuş was involved in bombing Greek forces around Bursa and Bilecik multiple times with a Pfalz D.III after taking off from Eskişehir. The bombing runs ended on 25 March, when Hürkuş had an engine failure and was forced to return and land. Prior to the Battle of the Sakarya, the Turkish Air Force only had a single operational hunting aircraft, as two had been shot down and one was in need of repairs. On 19 August 1921, Hürkuş flew a captured de Havilland DH.9 of the Greek Air Force, which had made an emergency landing at Kuşadası a month prior. He concluded that the plane was still operational, and named it İsmet. During the Battle of the Sakarya, he made a total of 24 reconnaissance flights with the plane. In 1923, Hürkuş was tasked with flying an abandoned passenger plane from Edirne to İzmir.

== First Turkish airplane ==
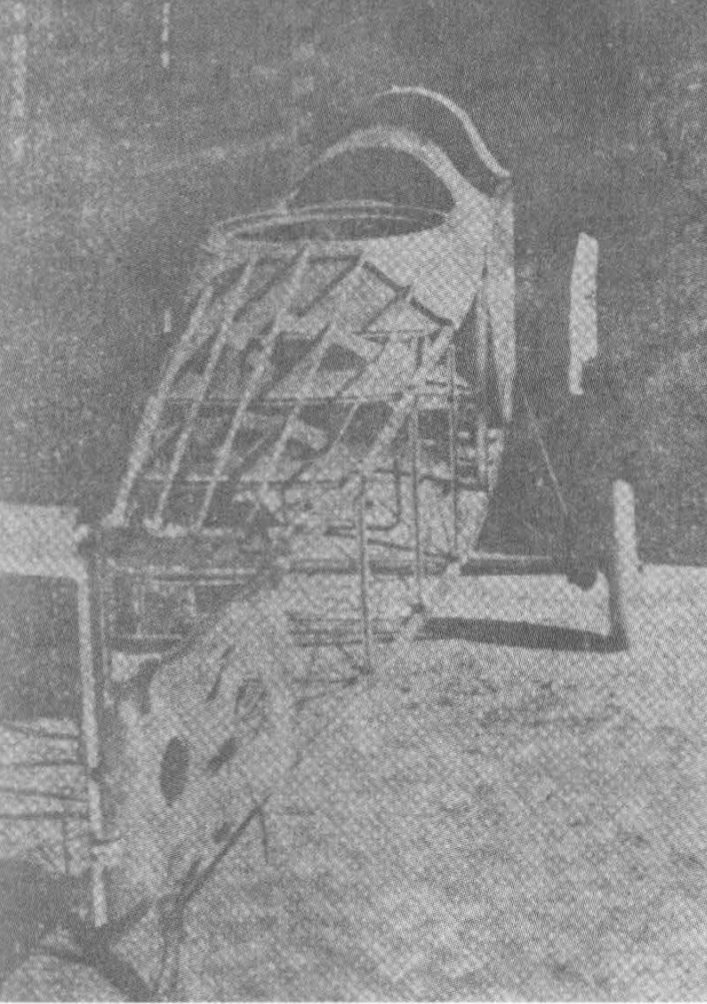
The Vecihi K-VI during its production, c. 1924

By 14 June 1923, Hürkuş had finished the technical drawings of his new training and reconnaissance aircraft, the Vecihi K-VI. He presented the project to the Turkish Air Force, which approved it. Together with his friends, Hürkuş started to work on building the plane at the Halkapınar Aircraft Repair Workshop. He spent at least 16 hours a day on building the plane, sometimes sleeping less than two hours. He was only not working when despatched on long-distance duties, such as in December 1923, when he was sent to study European aviation with five other aviators, and only returned after April 1924. The aircraft was assembled in 14 months. A technical committee to certify the plane was formed, but the flight request was denied due to the lack of qualified members in the committee to assess the plane. On 28 January 1925, Hürkuş flew the K-VI for the first time, and landed back after a flight of 15 minutes. This was the first ever flight made with a Turkish-produced aircraft.

Later that day, Hürkuş was notified that he had received a jail sentence for flying without a permit. (Note: Exact number differs depending on source. Anadolu Agency, based on Hürkuş's interview in 1925 with Resimli Ay, claims 10 days, while Hürkuş in his own book writes that it was 15 days.) This led him to resign from the air force immediately. When the general inspectorship was notified of his resignation, his sentence was lifted, "but it was too late." Another director convinced him to retract his resignation. When he went to the inspector's office to do so, the inspector greeted him in a "harsh, cold and derogatory way", and he said instead that he came to finalize his resignation. Hürkuş tried to get the K-VI back, but "was met with lingering." The plane, which was left outside and not in a hangar, was later destroyed in unknown circumstances.

== Initial work with the Turkish Aircraft Society ==
Hürkuş joined the newly formed Turkish Aircraft Society (TTaC) after leaving the air force. He was tasked with organizing the engineering branch of the society. In June 1925, he flew an Ansaldo-built plane bought with donations by people in Ceyhan from Ankara to the city. Throughout the trip, he handed out leaflets to settlements about the TTaC. In Adana, on the way back, he made a stunt flight and drew helixes in the sky. The same year, he joined the TTaC committee that was formed to study European aviation. On 3 July, he went to Europe with three other committee members, and visited aviation facilities in Germany, Denmark, Sweden, France, and Italy. The group returned to Turkey on 2 September. He was known as the Head Aviator (Note: Turkish: Baş Tayyareci) of the TTaC at the time, but stopped using the title at the request of Recep Peker.

In 1926, he was sent to the Junkers factory in Germany by the Ministry of Defense, who wanted to set up a factory in Kayseri to produce aircraft. He detected some problems with the Junkers A 20, which were fixed on the A 35 model. Once back in Turkey, he was requested to fly passengers between Ankara and Kayseri with the Junkers G 23 and the Junkers F 13, which were the country's first civil aviation flights.

== Aircraft workshop and flight school ==
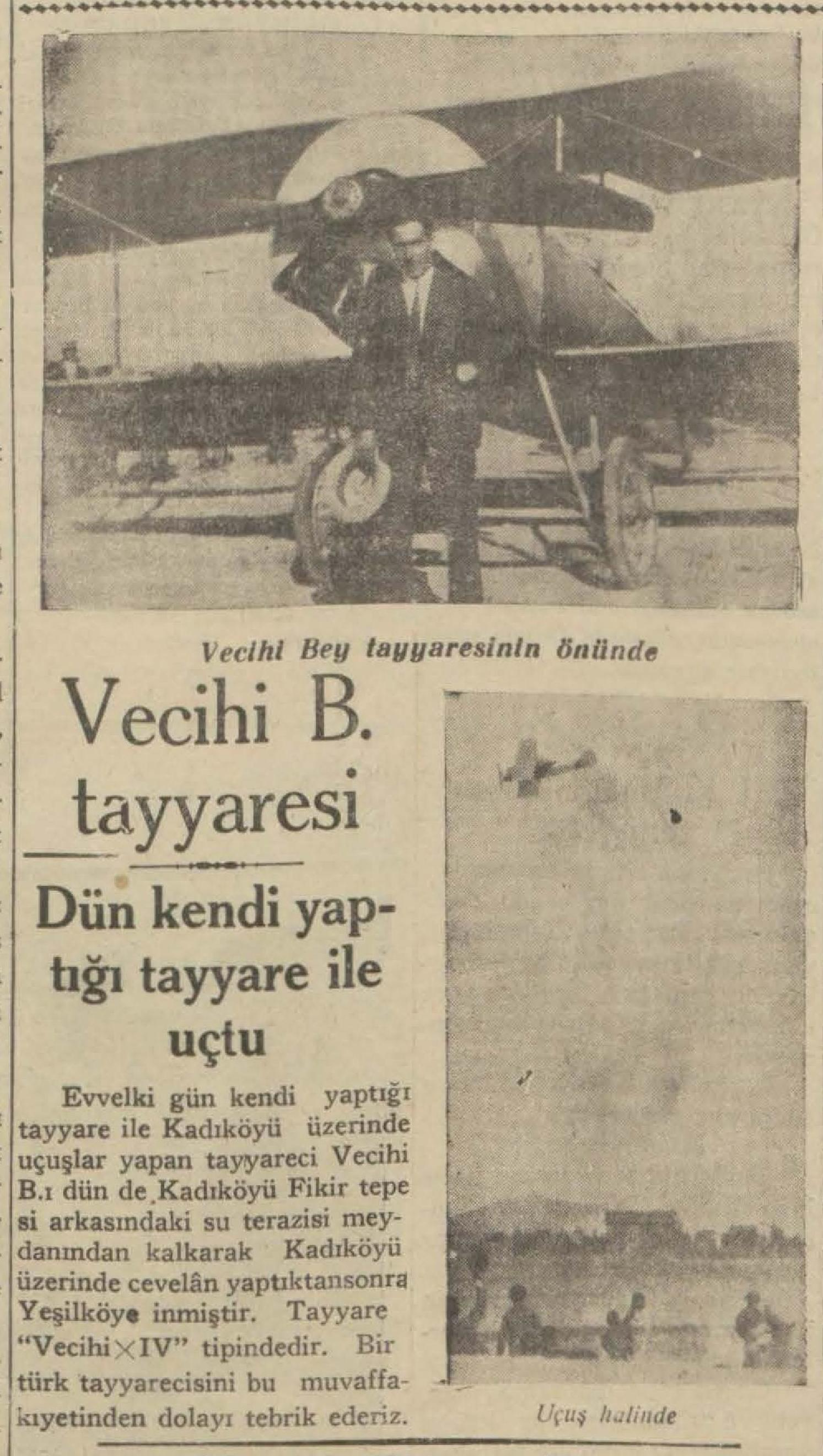
A news story on Milliyet daily newspaper about the 1930 flight of his second aircraft, the Vecihi K-XIV

In 1930, he took an extended break from TTaC. After leasing a lumber shop in Kadıköy with sea access, he built his second aircraft, Vecihi K-XIV, in three months. He flew the plane for the first time on 16 September in Fikirtepe, in front of the press and a crowd. He then flew the plane to Ankara to get a flight permit, but was again denied due to the lack of qualified personnel, and was instead told to get a permit abroad. It was decided to get the permit in Czechoslovakia due to the good relations between the country and Turkey. Hürkuş arrived at Prague on 6 December 1930, while his plane was still in Turkey. The plane was sent to Prague by train in February 1931, after all the relevant documents were translated into Czech. On 23 April 1931, the plane was certified at a nearby casino. Hürkuş flew from Czechoslovakia to Turkey with the Vecihi K-XIV, and arrived on 5 May. He flew domestically with the K-XIV to introduce aviation and held several conferences. In September 1931, he flew 5,000 kilometres (3,100 mi) through Anatolia, and made talks after the flights to convince the crowd to make donations to the TTaC. The TTaC received many donations and the flights were considered to be a success. However, the TTaC fired the assistant of Hürkuş because he didn't send reports to the society. Additionally, the Vecihi K-XIV was banned from flights; both reasons caused Hürkuş to resign from the TTaC.

Hürkuş was present at the opening ceremony of the first Turkish aero club on 28 December 1931. He gave lectures related to aviation in the club. He was elected to be one of the board of directors of the club in February 1932. After the club was closed, Hürkuş blamed the TTaC as it had not given any financial support to the club. During his conferences with the TTaC, he noticed the enthusiasm of young people for aviation. He received letters from people wanting to become aviators. He first made his intentions to open a public flight school in December 1931. The idea was approved by the General Staff of the Turkish Armed Forces. By January 1932, the location of the school was selected and construction on the hangar was almost finished. On 21 April 1932, Hürkuş officially founded Turkey's first civil aviation school, the Vecihi Sivil Tayyare Mektebi. Initially he wanted to start the trainings on 27 September the same year because it was the anniversary of the first flight of the Vecihi K-XIV. This had to be delayed to at least February 1933 due to more constructions taking place, but Hürkuş continued to use 27 September as it was a symbolic date. Sixteen students signed up to the school. The same year, Hürkuş also opened his own aircraft workshop, the Vecihi Faham Airplane Building Workshop. The workshop consisted of a single hangar.

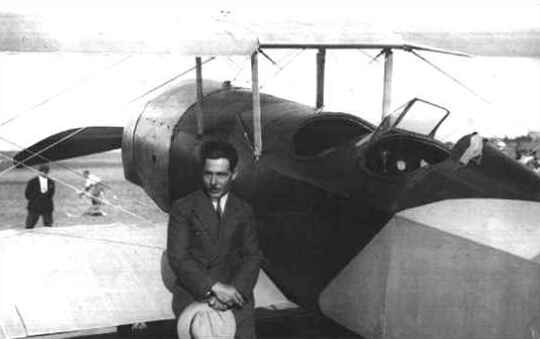
Hürkuş with the Vecihi K-XIV

The Vecihi K-XIV was used in training and a second K-XIV was also built for the same purpose. The school received several donations, including financial support and aircraft parts, mostly from official institutions. The General Staff of the Turkish Armed Forces gifted two aircraft in June 1933. Hürkuş also sold advertisements to generate more revenue to fund the school. The school provided training for engined and glider aircraft, though the latter form of training was never fully implemented. Six students, including Bedriye Tahir Gökmen, made a solo flight. On 17 September 1934, the school was shut down by the Müdafaa-i Milliye Vekâleti as "the government was planning to create a modern and large institution for a wider and more fundamental dissemination of civil aviation". Hürkuş went to Ankara to contest this decision, without success. During the time the flight school was operating, Hürkuş built several more aircraft. In 1933, with the help of a financial donation by fellow aviator Nuri Demirağ, he built the Vecihi K-XVI, which had a cabin, in his workshop. A boat powered by an aircraft engine, the Vecihi SK, was also constructed. The next year, Hürkuş built the Vecihi X-VI-D, a passenger seaplane.

== Second stint with the Turkish Aircraft Society ==
In 1935, Mustafa Kemal Atatürk asked Fuat Bulca to create a new aviation project with the TTaC and have Hürkuş involved in it. The aim of this project, which was named Türkkuşu, was to train young Turkish aviators. Hürkuş relocated to Ankara with one of his planes. In Ankara, he worked on the construction of Türkkuşu hangars and facilities. As part of the project, students of his former flight school, and several other students, including Sabiha Gökçen, were sent to a glider school in Koktebel, Soviet Union. From 1935 to 1936, Hürkuş worked on building Turkey's first glider. In total, he built two: the Ankara US-4 and Ankara PS-2.

After the TTaC was renamed as the Turkish Aeronautical Association (THK), Hürkuş joined it again and was sent to the Weimar Engineering School in Germany in 1937. On 27 February 1939, he received a diploma in aircraft engineering from the school. He then returned to Turkey, and applied to the Ministry of Public Works to get his engineering license, but was rejected because "two years was too short to become an engineer". The Council of State later overturned this decision and his application was approved. The THK appointed him to its branch office in Van, which lacked technical feasibility. This led him to resign from the THK.

== Later ventures and death ==
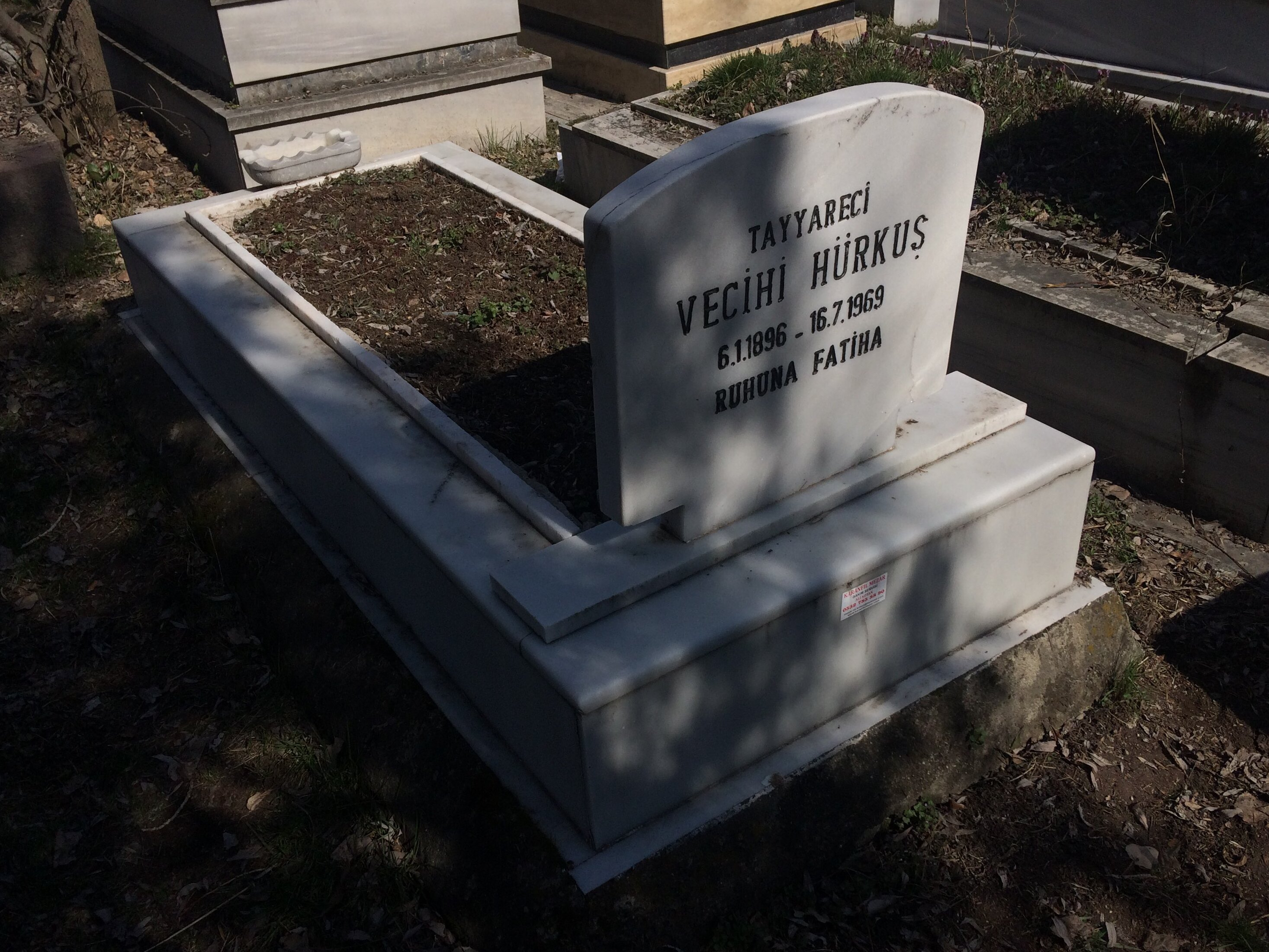
The grave of Hürkuş at the Cebeci Asri Cemetery

In 1942, Hürkuş wrote his first book, Havalarda, about his experience in aviation from 1915 to 1925. In 1947, he founded an aviation club named Kanatlılar Birliği, and started publishing a monthly aviation magazine, Kanatlılar, the next year, which continued for 12 issues. In 1951, he and five friends founded a company to do agricultural spraying from the air, but left it later due to a disagreement. A year later he bought a Proctor V from the United Kingdom, which he used to make flights to advertise several brands.

On 29 November 1954, Hürkuş founded his own airline named Hürkuş Hava Yolları, for which he bought former aircraft of Turkish Airlines. He aimed to fly to destinations not served by others, but the airline was banned from flying after sabotages and aircraft problems. One of the planes was hijacked and taken to Bulgaria in 1955. Towards the end of his life, Hürkuş was in debt due to the insurance costs of the planes that were unable to fly; even his payments from the government for his national service were confiscated.

While in Ankara, Hürkuş suffered an intracranial hemorrhage, which put him in a coma. He died on 16 July 1969 at the Gülhane Military Medical Academy. He is buried at the Cebeci Asri Cemetery. In his 52-year flying career, Hürkuş flew 102 types of aircraft, and stayed airborne for over 30,000 hours.

== Legacy ==
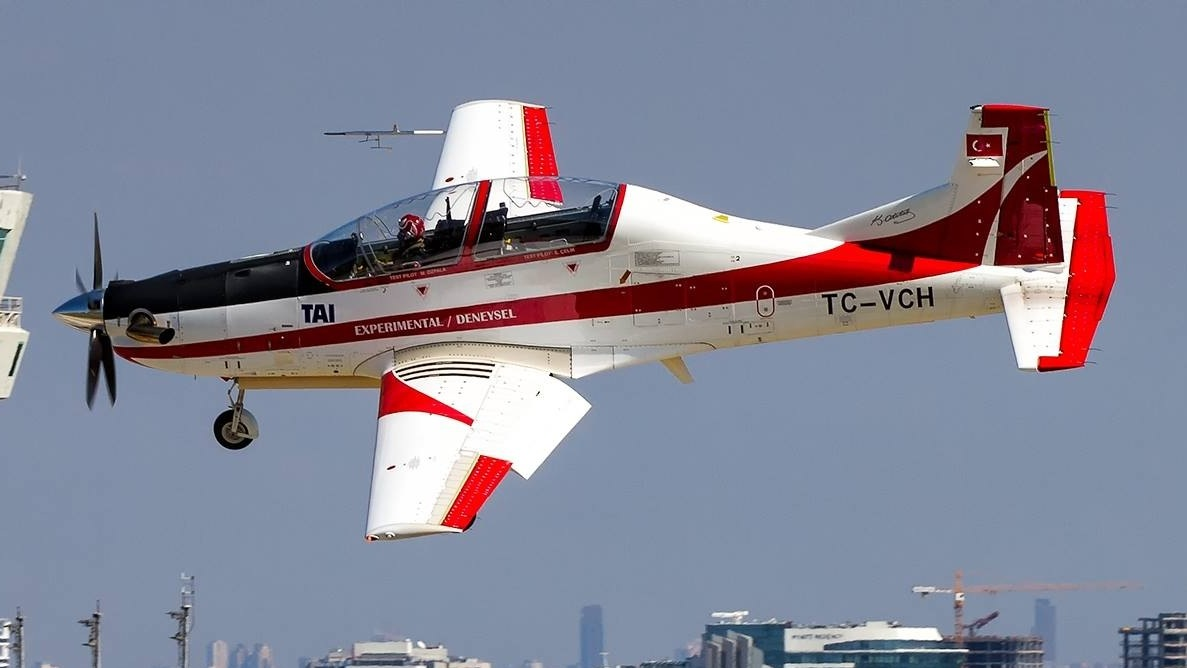
The TAI Hürkuş is named after Vecihi Hürkuş

Hürkuş received three commendations from the Grand National Assembly of Turkey for his service in the Turkish War of Independence and is the only person to receive this many such commendations. He also received the Medal of Independence for his work as a pilot during the War of Independence.

According to Abdullah Aydoğan of the Kırşehir Ahi Evran University, Turkish aviation "gained valuable experience" thanks to Hürkuş's initiatives despite the "limited resources at his disposal". The turboprop trainer aircraft Hürkuş and the supersonic light combat aircraft Hürjet, both developed by Turkish Aerospace Industries (TAI), were named after him. The 2018 drama film Hürkuş: Göklerdeki Kahraman by Kudret Sabancı is based on his life. In 2022, the Turkish Radio and Television Corporation (TRT) started filming Savunma Sanayiinin Yalnız Dehaları, (English:The Lonely Geniuses of the Defense Industry) a documentary which focuses on the lives of five important Turkish people in national defense, including Hürkuş.

== See also ==
- Ahmet Ali Çelikten
- Anthony Fokker
- Fesa Evrensev
