= Şükrü Koçak =

Turkish politician (1886–1961)

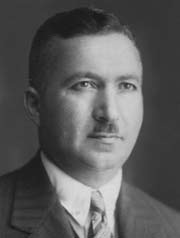

Member of the Grand National Assembly

Personal details
- Born: 1886 Elazığ, Ottoman Empire
- Died: 1961 (aged 74–75) Ankara, Turkey

Şükrü Koçak (1886, Elazığ, Ottoman Empire – 1961, Ankara, Turkey) was a Turkish career officer, government minister, politician, and ideologue of the Kemalist doctrine.

== Biography ==
He graduated from the Military Academy. Between 1939 and 1947 he was the Chairman of the Turkish Aeronautical Association. Between 1 November to 7 December 1944, he took part in the delegation representing Turkey at the International Civil Aviation Conference held in Chicago.

He was made the Minister of Transport and worked with the Recep Peker and Hasan Saka governments. He was married and had two children.

On September 26, 1917, together with Vecihi Hürkuş, they shot down a Russian plane, this incident is considered a first in Turkish aviation history.
