= Rumpler B.I =

B.I
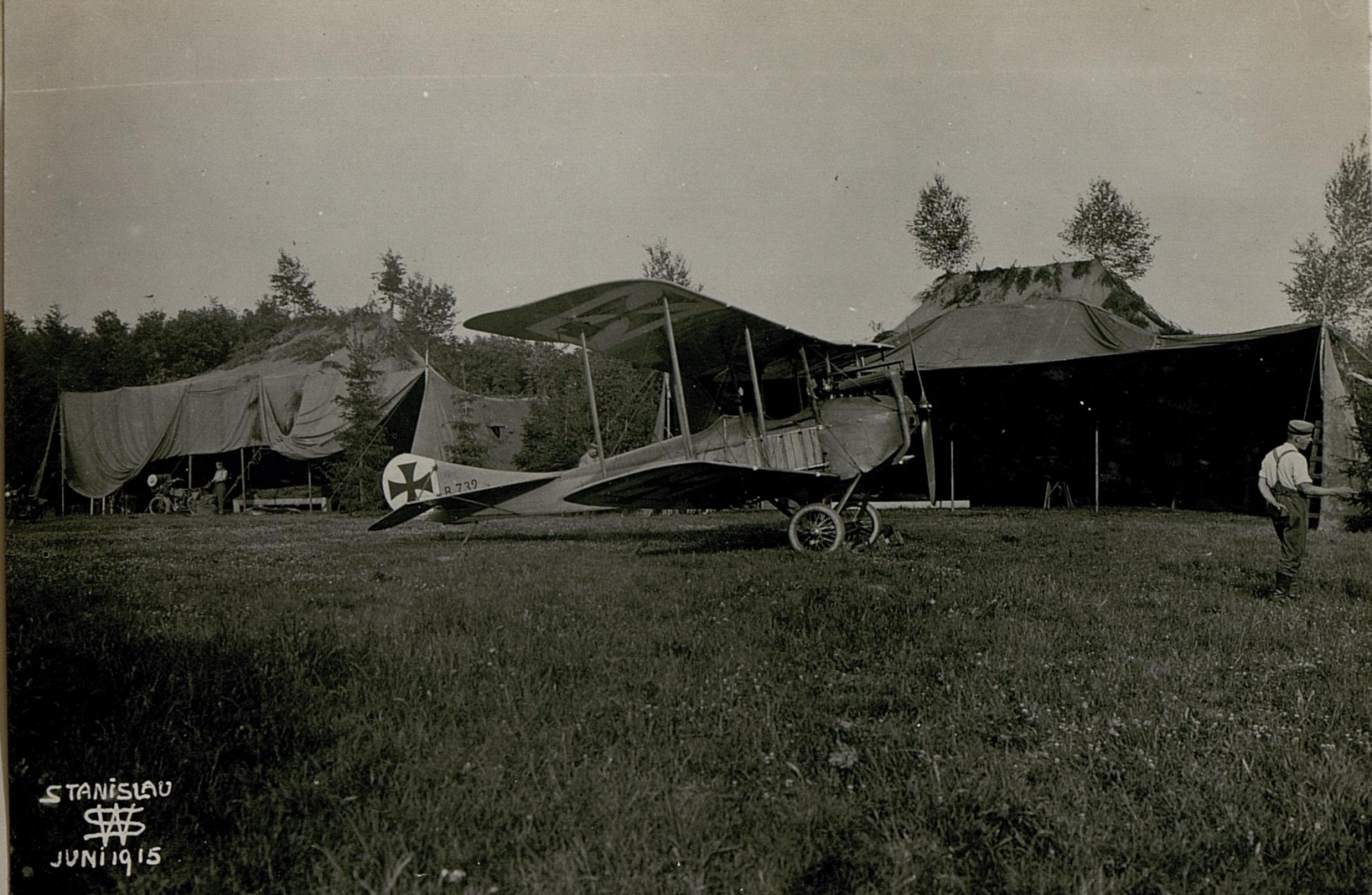

General information
- Type: Reconnaissance aircraft
- National origin: Germany
- Manufacturer: Rumpler
- Primary user: Luftstreitkräfte
- Number built: ca 225

History
- First flight: 1914

The Rumpler B.I (factory designation 4A) was a military reconnaissance aircraft produced in Germany during World War I.

== Design and development ==
The B.I was a conventional two-bay biplane with unstaggered wings of unequal span. It featured two open cockpits in tandem and fixed, tailskid undercarriage. Its upper wing reflected the wing design of the Etrich Taube that Rumpler was building at the time.

Rumpler built 198 of these aircraft for the Luftstreitkräfte, plus 26 seaplane versions for the Imperial German Navy.

== Variants ==
- 4A - landplane with Mercedes D.I engine, military designation B.I
  - 4A13 - B.I with balanced, comma-style rudder
  - 4A14 - version with Benz Bz.III engine
- 4B - seaplane
  - 4B1 - version with Mercedes D.I engine
  - 4B2 - version with Benz Bz.III engine
  - 4B11 - version with Benz Bz.I engine
  - 4B12 - version with Benz Bz.III engine

== Operators ==
Denmark

- Royal Danish Air Force - Postwar.

Germany

- Luftstreitkrafte
- Kaiserliche Marine

Turkey

- Ottoman Air Force

== Specifications ==
Data from Gray & Thetford 1962, p.518

General characteristics

- Crew: Two, pilot and observer
- Length: 8.40 m (27 ft 7 in)
- Wingspan: 13.00 m (42 ft 8 in)
- Height: 3.10 m (10 ft 2 in)
- Empty weight: 750 kg (1,650 lb)
- Gross weight: 970 kg (2,100 lb)
- Powerplant: 1 × Mercedes D.I , 75 kW (100 hp)

Performance

- Maximum speed: 145 km/h (90 mph, 78 kn)
