= Lieutenant colonel =

Military rank

Lieutenant colonel (UK: /lɛfˈtɛnənt ˈkɜːrnəl/ lef-TEN-ənt KUR-nəl, US: /luːˈtɛn-/ loo-TEN-) is a rank of commissioned officers in the armies, most marine forces and some air forces of the world, above a major and below a colonel. Several police forces, such as in the United States, also use the rank of lieutenant colonel.

== Etymology ==
The rank of lieutenant colonel is often shortened to simply "colonel" in conversation and in unofficial correspondence. Sometimes, the term 'half-colonel' is used in casual conversation in the British Army. Additionally, in the U.S. Army 'light colonel' has been used informally in the past. In the British military, it is customary to refer to either a lieutenant colonel or a colonel by their first names when mentioning them, e.g. "Colonel Tim will be at the parade". In the United States Air Force, the term 'light bird' or 'light bird colonel' (as opposed to a 'full bird colonel') is an acceptable casual reference to the rank but is never used directly towards the rank holder. A lieutenant colonel is typically in charge of a battalion or regiment in the army.

== Gallery ==
=== Ground forces ===
Australian Army
(Lieutenant colonel)

Bangladesh Army
(Lieutenant colonel)

Belgian Army
(Luitenant-kolonel
Lieutenant-colonel)

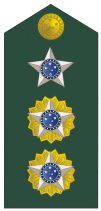
Brazilian Army
(Tenente coronel)

Royal Cambodian Army
(វរសេនីយ៍ទោ)

Canadian Army
(Lieutenant-colonel)

Czech Army
(Podplukovník)

Danish Army
(Oberstløjtnant)

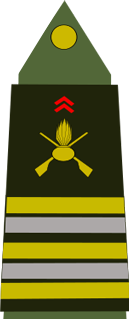
French Army
(Lieutenant colonel)

German Army
(Oberstleutnant)

Indian Army
(Lieutenant colonel)

Indonesian Army
(Letnan kolonel)

Italian Army
(Tenente colonnello)

Royal Netherlands Army
(Luitenant-kolonel)

New Zealand Army
(Rūtene kanara)

Norwegian Army
(Oberstløytant)

Pakistan Army
(Lieutenant colonel)

Philippine Army
(Kalakan/Teniente coronel)

Portuguese Army
(Tenente coronel)

Russian Ground Forces
(Podpolkóvnik)

Spanish Army
(Teniente coronel)

Sri Lanka Army
(Lieutenant colonel)

Turkish Land Forces
(Yarbay)

British Army
(Lieutenant colonel)

United States Army
(Lieutenant colonel)

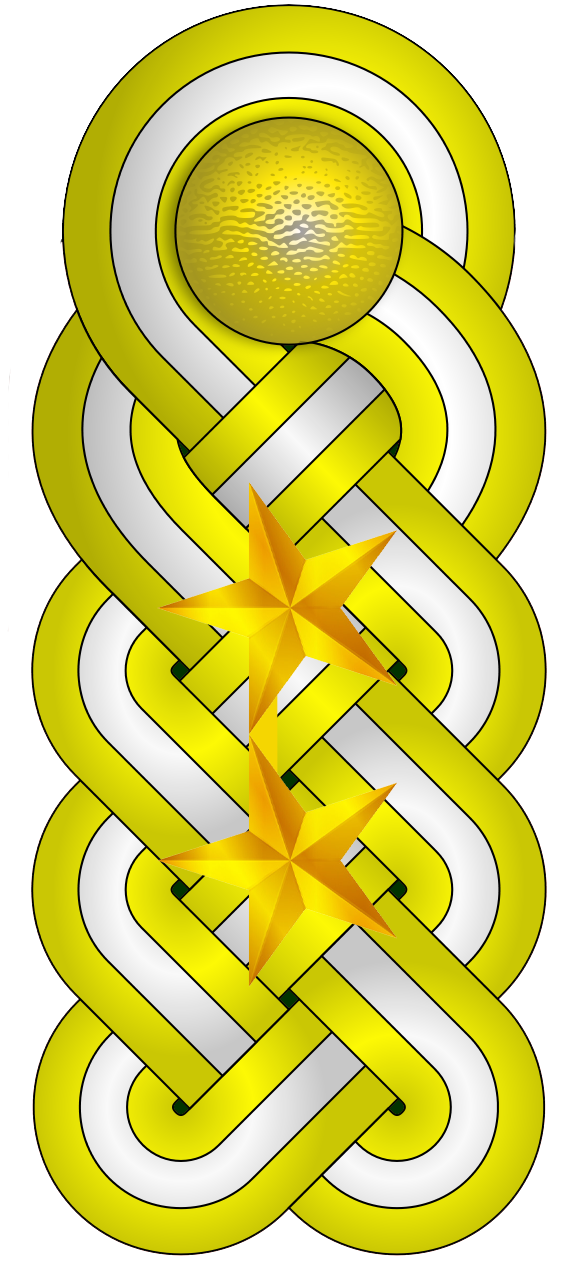
Venezuela
(Teniente coronel)

=== Aerospace forces ===
Belgian Air Force
(Luitenant-kolonel
Lieutenant-colonel)

Royal Cambodian Air Force
(វរសេនីយ៍ទោ)

Danish Air Force
(Oberstløjtnant)

Royal Netherlands Air Force
(Luitenant-kolonel)

Norwegian Air Force
(Oberstløytant)

Philippine Air Force
(Kalakan/Teniente coronel)

Russian Air Force
(Podpolkóvnik)

United States Air Force
(Lieutenant colonel)

United States Space Force
(Lieutenant colonel)

== See also ==
- Comparative military ranks
- Canadian Forces ranks and insignia
- British Army officer rank insignia
- United States Army officer rank insignia
