= Lieutenant colonel (Turkey) =

Rank insignia of a Turkish lieutenant colonel

Lieutenant colonel (Turkish: Yarbay) is the Turkish military rank of lieutenant colonel. It was first used in the Ottoman Army in 1870.

In normal circumstance they serve 3 years (shorter than others) because of preparation rank. In the Turkish Army (Kara Kuvvetleri) and Turkish Gendarmerie (Jandarma) they serve as battalion commanding officer, in Turkish Navy battleship executive officer and in Turkish Air Force serve as squadron commander. In the normal circumstances, they have to wait a short period of time to be colonel.
