= Fesa tricolor =

Scientific classification
- Kingdom: Animalia
- Phylum: Arthropoda
- Subphylum: Chelicerata
- Class: Arachnida
- Order: Opiliones
- Family: Sclerosomatidae
- Subfamily: Gagrellinae
- Genus: Fesa; Roewer, 1953
- Species: F. tricolor

Binomial name
- Fesa tricolor Roewer, 1953

Genus of harvestmen/daddy longlegs

Fesa tricolor is a species of harvestmen in a monotypic genus in the family Sclerosomatidae.
