= Deperdussin TT =

French pre-WW1 and WW1 reconnaissance aircraft

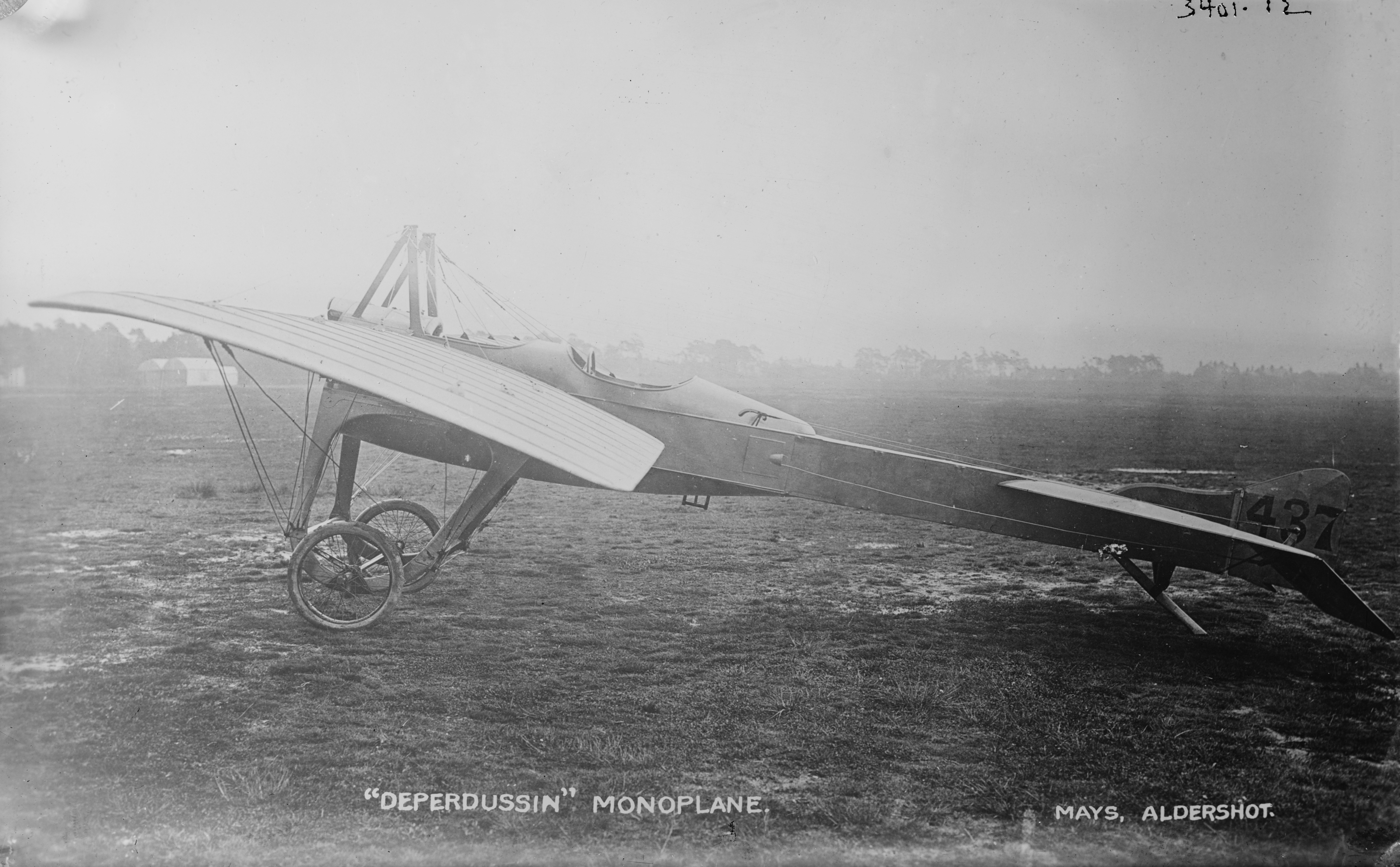

General information
- Type: General-purpose monoplane
- Manufacturer: Société Pour les Appareils Deperdussin
- Primary users: French Air Force Royal Flying Corps

History
- Introduction date: 1912

The Deperdussin TT was a French monoplane built by Société Pour les Appareils Deperdussin, later to become S.P.A.D. Introduced in 1912, the type was one widely used by the French Air Force (then Aviation Militaire) before the First World War. In February 1914, an experiment was made to install a machine gun on the aircraft, but this did not see service.

A number were used by the Naval Wing of the British Royal Flying Corps, one being fitted with floats and flown from Lake Windemere.

== Operators ==
Belgium

- Belgian Air Force

France

- French Air Force

Paraguay

- Paraguayan Air Force

Portugal

- Portuguese Air Force

Russia

- Imperial Russian Air Service

Serbia

- Serbian Air Force

Spain

- Spanish Air Force

Turkey

- Ottoman Air Force

United Kingdom

- Royal Flying Corps
  - No. 3 Squadron RFC
- Royal Naval Air Service

== Specifications ==
General characteristics

- Crew: Two
- Length: 7.92 m (26 ft 0 in)
- Wingspan: 10.97 m (36 ft 0 in)
- Height: 2.69 m (8 ft 10 in)
- Gross weight: 725 kg (1,664 lb)
- Powerplant: 1 × Gnome Rotary , 60 kW (80 hp)

Performance

- Maximum speed: 114 km/h (71 mph, 62 kn)
- Endurance: 2 hours 20 minutes

== See also ==
Related lists

- List of military aircraft of France
- List of aircraft of the Royal Flying Corps
