= Yusuf Kenan Bey =

Ottoman aviator and soldier

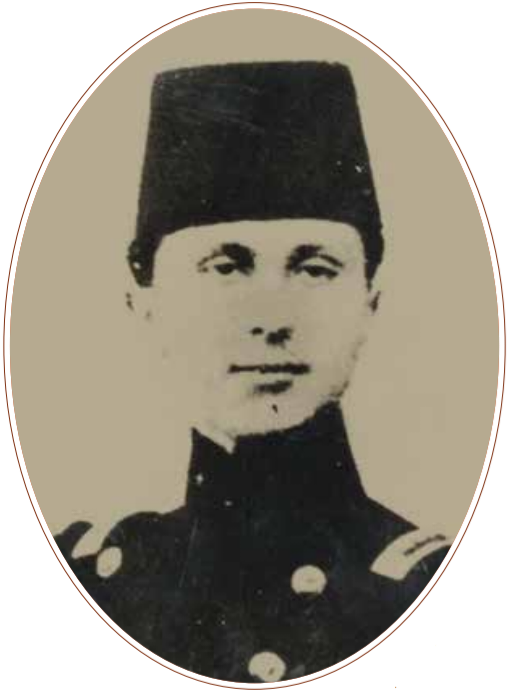
Yusuf Kenan Bey in uniform

Yusuf Kenan Bey (died c. 1915, Gallipoli) was an Ottoman senior lieutenant and one of the first Turkish pilots. In 1911, he and Fesa Evrensev were sent to a flight school in France. He completed his training in March 1912, one month after Evrensev, and became an instructor at the first Ottoman flight school in April, but quit flying by the end of the year. Yusuf Kenan died during the Gallipoli campaign.

== Military career ==
In February 1911, while Yusuf Kenan was a senior lieutenant, the Ottoman Army announced that it would send two people to a European flight school. The two pilots would be decided by a series of exams, with participants being eliminated after each one. In the final exam, Yusuf Kenan got the second highest score behind Fesa Evrensev. The two went through a medical check and were cleared to be sent abroad. The army initially wanted to send them to Germany, but due to France having more advanced technology at the time and lower costs, they were sent to the flight school of Blériot Aéronautique on 9 July. A military attaché in France reported that Yusuf Kenan was not brave enough. During training, he had several accidents, which caused the expenses to be higher than expected. Following this, the Ottoman Army decided to create its own flight school. He finished his training on 10 March 1912, a month after Evrensev.

They returned to Istanbul to take delivery of two aircraft on 20 April to be used in the flight school and became the first instructors at the school. However, Yusuf Kenan was no longer a part of the school by the start of the Balkan Wars in October nor was he one of the 12 pilots at the air force. He reportedly quit aviation completely before December. According to Fesa Evrensev, after he stopped flying, Yusuf Kenan went to the front lines and was killed during the Gallipoli campaign.
