= Taka (boat) =

Traditional small boat in Turkey

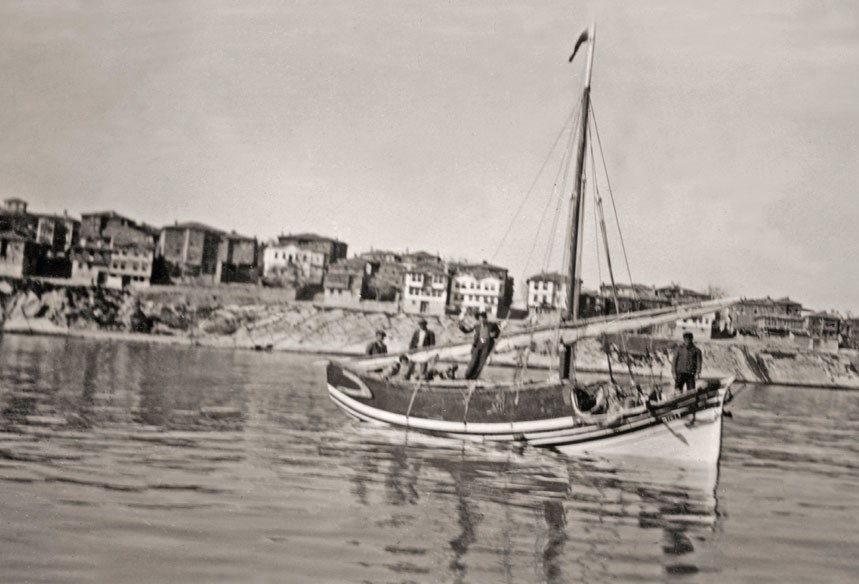
A Taka in the 1930s.

Taka (Laz: თაკა Taǩa) is a traditional small boat, typical of the Black Sea shores of Turkey where they are primarily, but not exclusively, built and used. They can be used in fishing or for carrying small loads and a limited number of passengers. Although not very fast, they are well-balanced and resistant and are especially well-suited for the thick waves of the Black Sea. In Turkey, they are very often built by Laz people and are associated with Laz culture or with the wider Black Sea culture.

== Description ==
Their length may vary between 8 and 12 meters (26 and 39 ft) and they are usually conceived in a way as to ensure a load capacity of 5 to 10 tons in weight. Those employed in fishing are generally smaller.

== History ==
Until recent years, they were primarily built in boatyards in (from east to west on Turkey's Black Sea shores) Sürmene, Amasra, Bartın, Kurucaşile and Şile, and within Istanbul, in Silivri, Ayvansaray and Rumelikavağı districts or quarters. Even when situated in the Western Black Sea coasts of Turkey, these boatyards are usually owned, managed and staffed by boatbuilders from the eastern ends of the Black Sea.

Their emergence under distinct and authentic lines is dated to the 19th century, certainly as a result of the experience accumulated over ages. In a short span of time, they became one of the identifying features of the Turkish Black Sea. Their symbol-laden history was further enriched by the services rendered by the taka and their captains and crews during the Turkish War of Independence, transporting smuggled arms to Turkish armies in inner Anatolia. Slightly before that, takas also assured the passage of the Black Sea for Russian refugees after the Bolshevik Revolution.

For local people, taka was an indispensable means of transport employed through all aspects of the daily life. Until the recent extension of the roads network in the region, Turkey's Black Sea region as a whole largely depended on sea transport in its economy, social life and contacts with the outside world.

== Sources ==
- "Encyclopedic Dictionary of Black Sea" ("Karadeniz: Ansiklopedik Sözlük", 2005, ISBN 975-6121-00-9) by Özhan Öztürk
- Web site about the culture/history/life and a travel guide for the Black Sea region of Turkey
- Web portal of Turkish shipmodelling aficionados
