= Almada River =

River in Bahia, Brazil

- Location within Brazil
- Native name: Rio Almada (Portuguese)

Location
- Country: Brazil

Physical characteristics
- Source
  - location: Bahia state
- Mouth
  - location: Ilhéus, Atlantic Ocean
  - coordinates: 14.775278°S 39.051753°W
- Length: 138 kilometres (86 mi)

The Almada River (Portuguese: Rio Amada) is a river of Bahia state in eastern Brazil.

== Basin ==
The Almada River basin is in the southern region of Bahia State, covering the municipalities of Almadina, Coaraci, Ibicaraí, Barro Preto, Itajuípe, Itabuna, Ilhéus and Uruçuca. It has an area of 1,545 square kilometres (597 sq mi) and a perimeter of 332 kilometres (206 mi). It is in the cocoa-growing region of Bahia. It includes significant fragments of Atlantic Forest, as well as secondary forest and mangroves. The climate of the basin is hot and humid. According to the Köppen climate classification, there are three climate domains. In the west it is Aw - tropical climate with winter dry season, in the center in is Am - monsoon climate and on the coast it is Af - humid tropical climate.

== Course ==
The Almada River has a length of 138 kilometres (86 mi) from its source in the Serra do Chuchu in Almadina to its mouth at the Itaípe bar in Ilheus. Its mouth is near the Trincheiras Cove, where the port of Malhado is located. The lower section of the river runs through the 157,745 hectares (389,800 acres) Lagoa Encantada e Rio Almada Environmental Protection Area (APA), created in 1993, where it drains the Lagoa Encantada. In the APA it passes the communities of Castelo Novo, Sambaituba and Aritaguá. From Aritaguá the river flows south parallel to the sea shore past Iguape, and empties into the Atlantic Ocean near the town of Ilhéus.

The Almada River supplies water to the towns of Itajuípe and Coaraci. It supplies about 70% of the water used by residents of Itabuna. In the summer of 2015–16 water rationing was imposed due to low levels in the river, which had dried up in some sections. As of 2010 half the domestic sewage from Aritaguá was released directly into the river, while 25% went into pits in backyards, and indirectly contaminated the river. Garbage was also dumped in the river.

== See also ==
- List of rivers of Bahia

== Sources ==
- "Estiagem deixa Rio Almada em nível crítico", Pimenta (in Portuguese), 16 January 2016
- "Lixo e Esgoto no Rio Almada", Pimenta (in Portuguese), 2 September 2010
- Maria Luiza Heine (27 May 2011), "O rio da minha cidade", Ilhéus… com amor! (in Portuguese)
- "Rio Almada e seu Afluentes", Petição Pública Brasil
- "Visita definirá fim – ou não – do racionamento de água em Itabuna", Pimenta (in Portuguese), 2 February 2016
- Zoneamento Apa da Lagoa Encantada e do Rio Almada (PDF) (in Portuguese), INEMA, 2013
