= Bastioides =

Scientific classification
- Kingdom: Animalia
- Phylum: Arthropoda
- Subphylum: Chelicerata
- Class: Arachnida
- Order: Opiliones
- Family: Sclerosomatidae
- Subfamily: Gagrellinae
- Genus: Bastioides; Mello-Leitão, 1931

Type species
- Bastioides coxopunctata Mello-Leitão, 1931

Genus of harvestmen/daddy longlegs

Bastioides is a monotypic genus of harvestmen from South America, belonging to the subfamily Gagrellinae of the family Sclerosomatidae. It contains the single species Bastioides coxopunctata, although its status as a unique species is currently in doubt and is considered nomen dubium.

The original specimen (holotype) was discovered in 1931 in Ilhéus, in the state of Bahia, Brazil. It was a juvenile, and was placed in its own genus based on the unique arrangement of femoral nodules (bumps on the legs). However, it has now been determined that the number of femoral nodules can be highly variable within a species, and thus not useful as a diagnostic characteristic. In 2003, Tourinho speculated that the species could be a member three other possible genera - Holcobunus, Jussara, or Pectenobunus - but since the species is based on a single juvenile species, it could not be properly verified, and thus the genus Bastioides and the type species B. coxopunctata are considered nomen dubium.
