= Ibirapitanga =

Municipality of Bahia, Brazil

- city
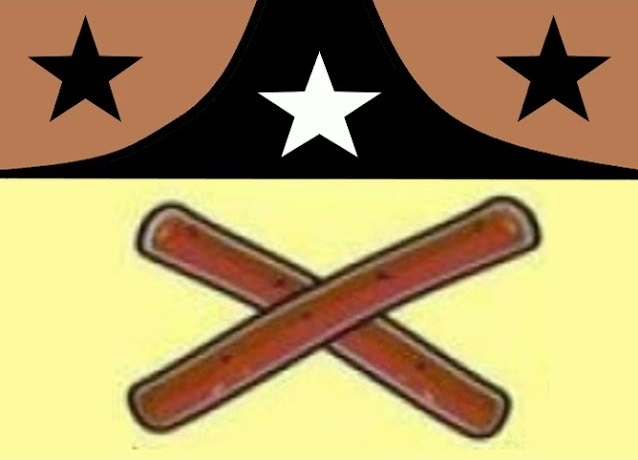
- Flag
- Nickname: Cachoeira-do-Pau
- Location of Ibirapitanga
- Coordinates: 14°09′45″S 039°22′21″W
- Region: Nordeste
- State: Bahia
- Municipality created: 3 August 1961

Area
  - Total: 472.0 km^{2} (182.2 sq mi)
- Elevation: 113 m (371 ft)

Population (2020)
  - Total: 23,404
- Time zone: UTC−3 (BRT)
- ZIP code: 45.500-000

Ibirapitanga is a municipality and a town in the State of Bahia, Brazil, located inland from the coast about 45 km. In 2020 the estimated population of the municipality was 23,404 inhabitants.

== History ==
The town was founded in 1915 when José Meneses de Oliveira built his home on the banks of the Cachoeira River, and it came to be known as Cachoeira do Pau. Later the name was changed to Ibirapitanga, a word in the Tupi language for "red wood" that is, Brazilwood.

The municipality was officially created in 1961, carved out of the interior portion of Camamu municipality, but came into effect in 1963.

== Administrative divisions ==
Ibirapitanga municipality is divided into four parts, the headquarters town of Ibirapitanga, and the rural divisions: Itamarati, Camamuzinho and Novo Horizonte.

== Geography ==
Ibirapitanga is bounded by the municipalities of Camamu to the east, Maraú to the southeast, Ubaitaba to the south, Ubatã to the west, Gandu and Piraí do Norte to the north and Igrapiúna to the northeast.

Highway BA-650 runs east to the town of Camamu. Highway 330 runs west to the towns of Ubatã and Ipiaú. Highway 101 runs north to Gandu and south to Ubaitaba and Itabuna.

== Economy ==
Ibirapitanga's economy is based on cocoa agriculture.

== See also ==
- List of municipalities in Bahia
