= Paratamboicus =

Scientific classification
- Domain: Eukaryota
- Kingdom: Animalia
- Phylum: Arthropoda
- Subphylum: Chelicerata
- Class: Arachnida
- Order: Opiliones
- Family: Sclerosomatidae
- Genus: Paratamboicus; Mello-Leitão, 1940

Genus of harvestmen/daddy longlegs

Paratamboicus was a genus of harvestmen in the family Sclerosomatidae from the Americas, described by Mello-Leitão 1940 with the type-species by original designation being Paratamboicus bicornutus Mello-Leitão, 1940. It was much later considered as Junior subjective synonym of Holcobunus Roewer 1910 by Tourinho & Kury (2001).

== Species ==
In older online sources, several species have been listed in the genus, although for many the presented combination does not have any support in the published literature

- Paratamboicus albianus (Mello-Leitão, 1944)
- Paratamboicus aureopunctata (Roewer, 1953)
- Paratamboicus bicornutus Mello-Leitão, 1940
- Paratamboicus bogotensis (Roewer, 1953)
- Paratamboicus chilensis (Piza, 1942)
- Paratamboicus cinctus (Roewer, 1953)
- Paratamboicus citrinus (Pocock, 1903)
- Paratamboicus conspersus (Roewer, 1953)
- Paratamboicus dubius (Ringuelet, 1960)
- Paratamboicus formosa (Ringuelet, 1953)
- Paratamboicus geniculata (Mello-Leitão, 1938)
- Paratamboicus granulata (Roewer, 1912)
- Paratamboicus iguassuensis (Mello-Leitão, 1935)
- Paratamboicus insperata (Soares, 1972)
- Paratamboicus laevis (Ringuelet, 1960)
- Paratamboicus littoralis (Mello-Leitão, 1938)
- Paratamboicus luteipalpis (Roewer, 1910)
- Paratamboicus marmorata (Mello-Leitão, 1935)
- Paratamboicus marmoratus (Mello-Leitão, 1938)
- Paratamboicus metallicus (Roewer, 1953)
- Paratamboicus mexicanus (Roewer, 1953)
- Paratamboicus misionicus (Ringuelet, 1960)
- Paratamboicus nigripalpis (Roewer, 1910)
- Paratamboicus riedeli (Starega, 1970)
- Paratamboicus segadasi (Mello-Leitão, 1949)
- Paratamboicus tenuis (Roewer, 1953)
- Paratamboicus tocantinus (Roewer, 1953)
- Paratamboicus trochanteralis (Roewer, 1953)
- Paratamboicus unicolor (Loman, 1902)
- Paratamboicus unifasciatus (Roewer, 1910)

For most of the above, see genera such as Holcobunus and Garleppa where the species were first described. Most have never been revised taxonomically since their description.
