= Almadina =

Almadina means "the city" in Arabic and may refer to:

- Almadina, Bahia, a municipality in Bahia, Brazil
- Medina, a city in Saudi Arabia mentioned in the quran as the place where the Islamic prophet Muhammed lived after fleeing from Mecca
- Al Madina (newspaper), in Saudi Arabia
- Al-Madina (Israeli newspaper), Israeli-Arabic newspaper
- Almadina (school), a charter school in Calgary, Alberta, Canada
- Almadina Sports Club, a Libyan football club
- Almahalla Tripoli, a Libyan football club
