= Umbogrella =

Scientific classification
- Kingdom: Animalia
- Phylum: Arthropoda
- Subphylum: Chelicerata
- Class: Arachnida
- Order: Opiliones
- Family: Sclerosomatidae
- Subfamily: Gagrellinae
- Genus: Umbogrella; Roewer, 1955
- Species: U. minuta

Binomial name
- Umbogrella minuta Roewer, 1955

Genus of harvestmen/daddy longlegs

Umbogrella is a monotypic genus of harvestmen in the family Sclerosomatidae. Its only species is Umbogrella minuta.
