= Itacaré =

Municipality of Bahia, Brazil

Coordinates: 14°16′41″S 38°59′46″W

- Municipality
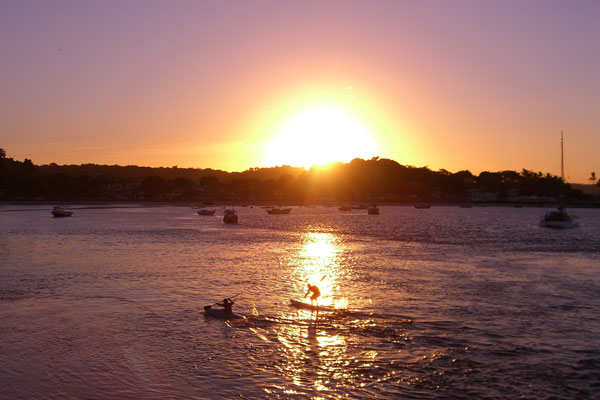
- The sun sets over Itacaré on Feb. 9, 2006

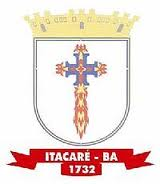
- Coat of arms

- Location in Bahia
- Country: Brazil
- Region: Nordeste
- State: Bahia

Population (2020)
  - Total: 28,684
- Time zone: UTC−3 (BRT)

Itacaré is a municipality in the cocoa zone of the state of Bahia in Brazil, south of Salvador.

== Geography ==
Itacaré is located 70 km north of Ilhéus where the Rio de Contas, which comes from the Chapada Diamantina, meets the Atlantic Ocean. Itacaré has about 27,000 residents. Out of these, approximately 50% live in the rural interior. A mixture of races - Amerindian, black and white - can be seen in the features of the natives, called "nação grapiúna", whom Jorge Amado affectionately referred to as "the captivating people of this land". The town was part of São Jorge dos Ilhéus, one of the 13 original Portuguese colonial Captaincies founded in 1532. Itacaré was first officially recognized in 1732 as the Vila de São Miguel da Barra do Rio de Contas (Village of Saint Michael of the Bar of the Contas). The village was established by the Jesuits who worked to convert and settle indigenous tribes of the area such as the Pataxós, Tupiniquins and Aimorés. The town was a notorious hangout for Dutch and Portuguese pirates during the early colonial period and later became a hub for the cocoa planting and a port for whalers. It was given city status in 1881.

The municipality contains 41% of the 9,275 hectares (22,920 acres) Serra do Conduru State Park, created in 1997. It also contains 14.88% of the 118,000 hectares (290,000 acres) Baía de Camamu Environmental Protection Area, created in 2002.

== Economy ==
The first economic activity in region was the harvesting of Brazilwood (Caesalpinia sp.) which was used to create dyes in Europe and is where Brazil received its name. During the early colonial period the region also produced cassava flour (Manihot esculenta) which was sent maintain slaves that ran the sugar plantations in the colonial capital of Salvador. The largest economic boom came from cacao (Theobroma cacao) production during the 19th and 20th centuries. Cacao was grown further in the interior and Itacaré was an important port for exporting the cocoa beans to producers in Europe. It was during this time that a number of neocolonial houses and warehouses were built along the river front that still characterize the historical center of the town. As road and railway networks expanded and the port in nearby Ilhéus was expanded, Itacaré's importance as a port diminished. Construction of two dams upriver in the 1960s also led to the port silting up, making it harder for larger ships to dock.

The final blow to the cacao industry in the region was the massive blight of Vassoura de Bruxa (Witch's broom) devastated the region's cocoa crops in the 1980s. Since then, Itacaré has depended mostly upon tourism. It is a popular destination for surfers, hikers and ecotourists.

The construction of the BR001 in 1998 that connected Itacaré to the airport in Ilhéus brought increased tourism growth and led to the development of numerous new neighborhoods as the town expanded. The town has a series of beautiful small cove-type beaches as well as Itacarezinho and other picturesque beaches further along the coast. Itacaré is on the edge of a national park, one of the last large expanses of Atlantic rain forest left in Brazil.

The change from sleepy agrarian town to tourist hotspot has not been an easy one, however. Locals recently won a hard-fought campaign to stop land owners who wanted to charge for access to the beaches.

Access to one of the most pristine beaches, Prainha, had been blocked by a hotel/condominium development called Sao Jose Eco Resort. Both Prainha and Sao Jose beaches are now accessible by foot, free of charge.

Despite development in the area, it remains a hub of Bahian culture. Many tourists visit Itacaré to take part in the local Capoeira circles and eat traditional Brazilian food. The town is flooded with revelers during New Year's and Carnival.

Itacaré has been mentioned as one of the world's top 10 best small towns
