= Itacarezinho Beach =

Beach in Itacaré, Bahia, Brazil

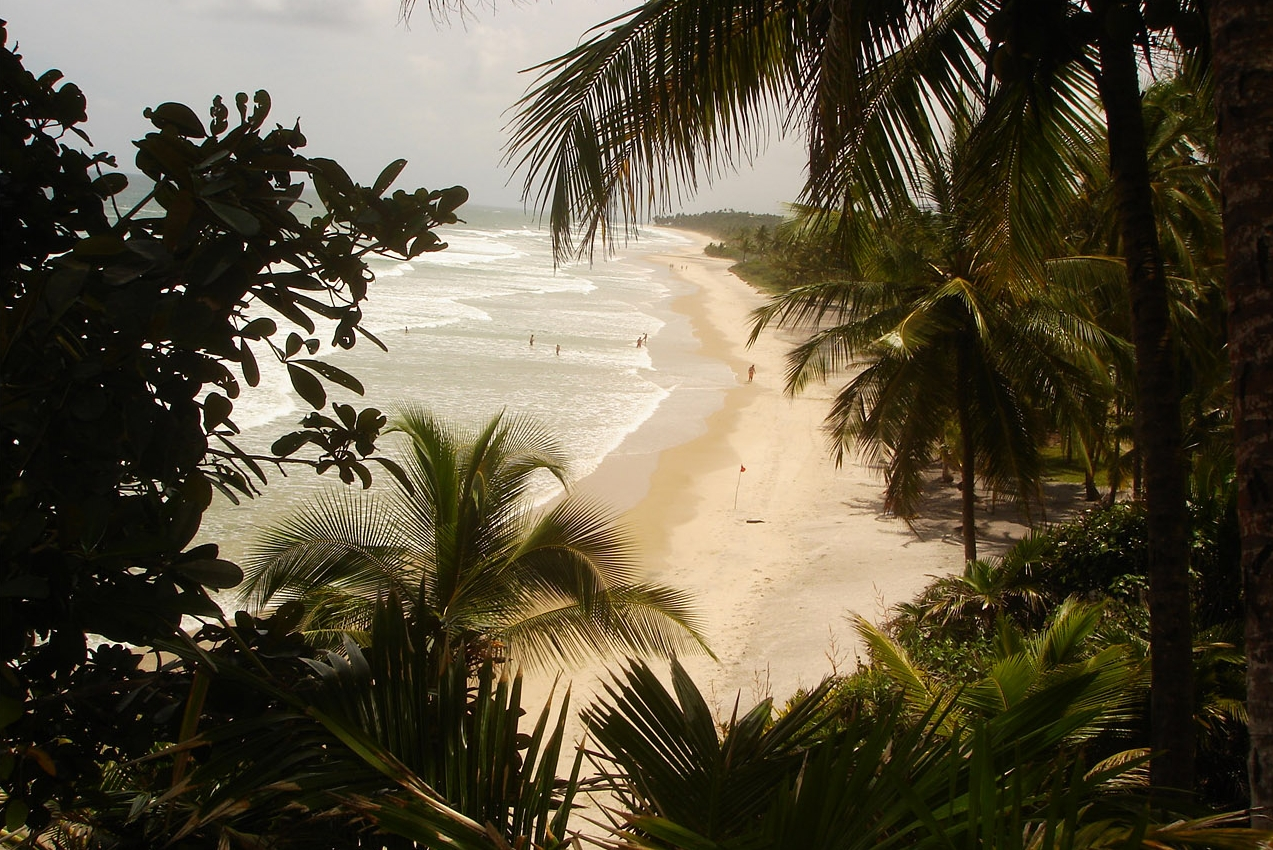
Itacarezinho.jpg

Itacarezinho Beach is a beach in Itacaré, a municipality in the Brazilian state of Bahia.

Despite having a diminutive suffix in Portuguese, Itacarezinho beach is in fact 3.5 km long, and is located 15 km south of Itacaré.

The northern section of the beach is also known as Camboinha.

The beach is valued for swimming, surfing, and walking. It has many palm trees, a bar, and a restaurant.

The beach can be reached by a trail from nearby beaches or by way of a road that leads to Ilhéus, which crosses private property. Access is free for pedestrians, but there is a fee for parking for automobiles.

There is a small waterfall which falls from the jungle and lands directly in the sand.
