= Toragrella =

Scientific classification
- Domain: Eukaryota
- Kingdom: Animalia
- Phylum: Arthropoda
- Subphylum: Chelicerata
- Class: Arachnida
- Order: Opiliones
- Family: Sclerosomatidae
- Subfamily: Gagrellinae
- Genus: Toragrella; Roewer, 1955

Genus of harvestmen/daddy longlegs

Toragrella is a genus of harvestmen in the family Sclerosomatidae. There are at least two described species in Toragrella.

== Species ==
These two species belong to the genus Toragrella:

- Toragrella longipes Roewer, 1955
- Toragrella normalis (Banks, 1930)
