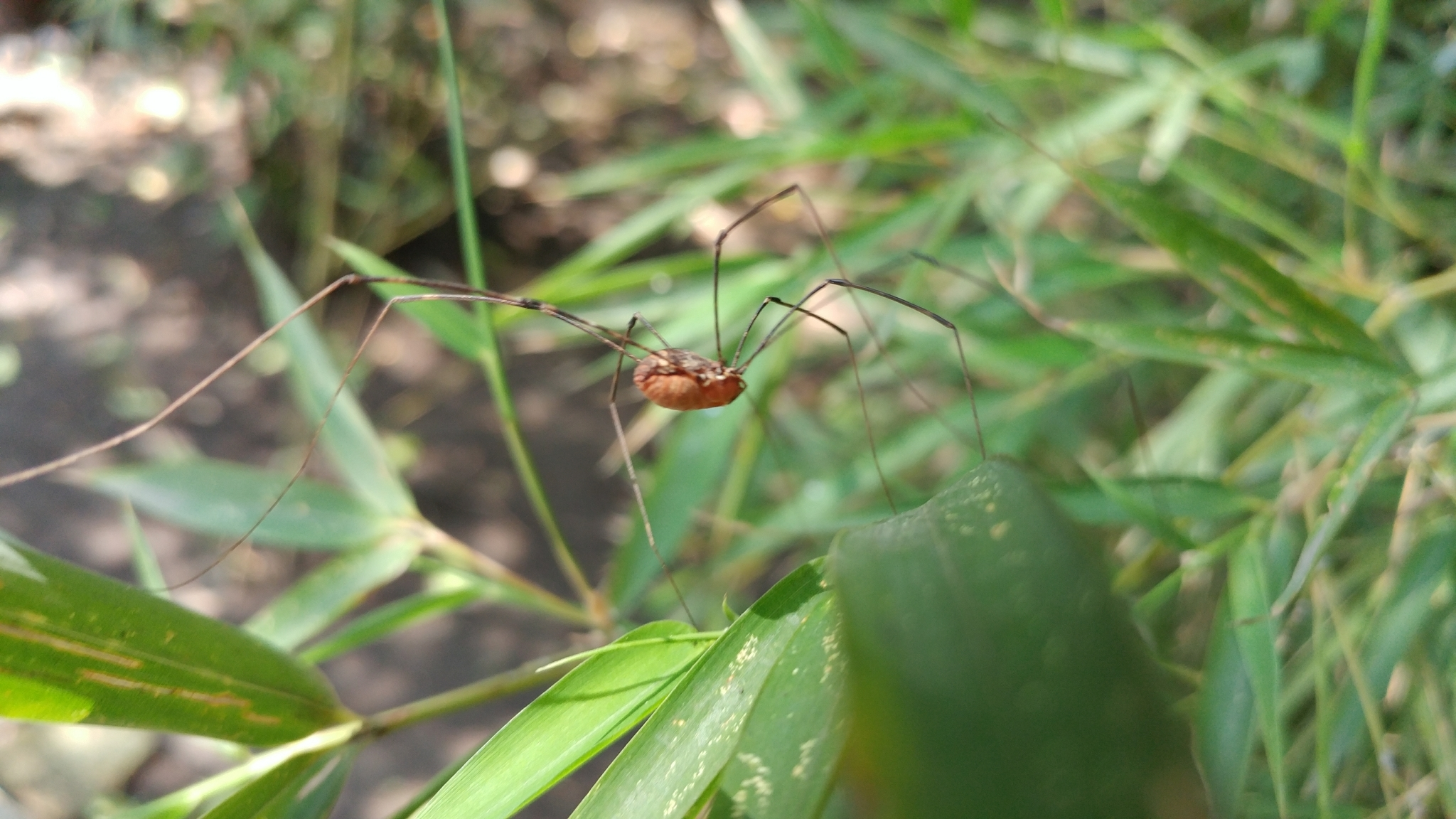
- Prionostemma sp.

Scientific classification
- Kingdom: Animalia
- Phylum: Arthropoda
- Subphylum: Chelicerata
- Class: Arachnida
- Order: Opiliones
- Family: Sclerosomatidae
- Subfamily: Gagrellinae
- Genus: Prionostemma; Pocock, 1903

= Prionostemma =

Genus of harvestmen/daddy longlegs

Prionostemma is a large genus of harvestmen in the family Sclerosomatidae from Mexico, Central America, and South America.

== Species ==
- Prionostemma acentrus Forster, 1954
- Prionostemma acuminatus
- Prionostemma albimanum Roewer, 1912
- Prionostemma albipalpe (Banks, 1898)
- Prionostemma albofasciatum (F.O.Pickard-Cambridge, 1901)
- Prionostemma andinum Roewer, 1953
- Prionostemma arredoresium Roewer, 1953
- Prionostemma atrorubrum Roewer, 1912
- Prionostemma aureum Roewer, 1928
- Prionostemma aureolituratum Roewer, 1953
- Prionostemma aureomaculatum H.E.M.Soares, 1970
- Prionostemma aureopictum Roewer, 1953
- Prionostemma azulanum Roewer, 1953
- Prionostemma barnardi Forster, 1954
- Prionostemma bicolor Pocock, 1903
- Prionostemma bidens Roewer, 1953
- Prionostemma biolleyi (Banks, 1909)
- Prionostemma bogotanum Roewer, 1953
- Prionostemma boliviense Roewer, 1953
- Prionostemma bryantae Roewer, 1953
- Prionostemma ceratias Forster, 1954
- Prionostemma circulatum Roewer, 1914
- Prionostemma coloripes Roewer, 1933
- Prionostemma coriaceum (F.O.Pickard-Cambridge, 1904)
- Prionostemma coronatum (Loman, 1902)
- Prionostemma corrugatum Roewer, 1953
- Prionostemma coxale (Banks, 1909)
- Prionostemma crosbyi Roewer, 1953
- Prionostemma cubanum Roewer, 1953
- Prionostemma dentatum Roewer, 1910
- Prionostemma meridionale Ringuelet, 1959
- Prionostemma duplex Chamberlin, 1925
- Prionostemma efficiens Roewer, 1953
- Prionostemma elegans Roewer, 1953
- Prionostemma farinae Mello-Leitão, 1938
- Prionostemma ferrugineum Roewer, 1953
- Prionostemma festae Roewer, 1927
- Prionostemma fichteri C.J.Goodnight & M.L.Goodnight, 1947
- Prionostemma flavicoxale Roewer, 1953
- Prionostemma foveolatum (F.O.Pickard-Cambridge, 1904)
- Prionostemma frontale (Banks, 1909)
- Prionostemma frizzellae Roewer, 1953
- Prionostemma fulginosum Roewer, 1953
- Prionostemma fulvibrunneum Roewer, 1953
- Prionostemma fulvum (F.O.Pickard-Cambridge, 1904)
- Prionostemma fuscamaculata C.J.Goodnight & M.L.Goodnight, 1947
- Prionostemma genufuscum Roewer, 1910
- Prionostemma glieschi Mello-Leitão, 1938
- Prionostemma hadrus Forster, 1954
- Prionostemma henopoeus Forster, 1954
- Prionostemma heterus Forster, 1954
- Prionostemma hondurasium Roewer, 1953
- Prionostemma ignavus Forster, 1954
- Prionostemma insculptum Pocock, 1903
- Prionostemma insulare Roewer, 1953
- Prionostemma intermedium (Banks, 1909)
- Prionostemma laminus Forster, 1954
- Prionostemma laterale (Banks, 1909)
- Prionostemma leucostephanon Mello-Leitão, 1938
- Prionostemma limbatum Roewer, 1953
- Prionostemma limitatum Roewer, 1953
- Prionostemma lindbergi Mello-Leitão, 1938
- Prionostemma lubeca C.J.Goodnight & M.L.Goodnight, 1946
- Prionostemma luteoscutum Roewer, 1910
- Prionostemma magnificum Roewer, 1953
- Prionostemma martiniquem Roewer, 1953
- Prionostemma mediobrunneum Roewer, 1953
- Prionostemma melicum Roewer, 1953
- Prionostemma melloleitao Caporiacco, 1947
- Prionostemma mentiens Roewer, 1953
- Prionostemma minimum Roewer, 1910
- Prionostemma minutum Roewer, 1953
- Prionostemma montanum Roewer, 1953
- Prionostemma nevermanni Roewer, 1933
- Prionostemma nigranale Roewer, 1953
- Prionostemma nigrifrons Roewer, 1953
- Prionostemma nigrithorax Roewer, 1953
- Prionostemma nigrum Roewer, 1910
- Prionostemma nitens Roewer, 1953
- Prionostemma panama C.J.Goodnight & M.L.Goodnight, 1942
- Prionostemma perlucidum Roewer, 1910
- Prionostemma peruvianum Roewer, 1953
- Prionostemma piceum Roewer, 1953
- Prionostemma plaumanni Roewer, 1953
- Prionostemma pulchra C.J.Goodnight & M.L.Goodnight, 1942
- Prionostemma referens Roewer, 1953
- Prionostemma reticulatum Roewer, 1910
- Prionostemma retusum Roewer, 1953
- Prionostemma richteri Roewer, 1953
- Prionostemma riveti Roewer, 1914
- Prionostemma ruschii Mello-Leitão, 1940
- Prionostemma scintillans Pocock, 1903
- Prionostemma seriatum Roewer, 1953
- Prionostemma serrulatum Roewer, 1953
- Prionostemma simplex Chamberlin, 1925
- Prionostemma soaresi Caporiacco, 1951
- Prionostemma socialis Roewer, 1957
- Prionostemma spinituber Roewer, 1953
- Prionostemma splendens Roewer, 1953
- Prionostemma sulfureum Roewer, 1953
- Prionostemma surinamense Roewer, 1953
- Prionostemma synaptus Forster, 1954
- Prionostemma taciatum Roewer, 1953
- Prionostemma tekoma C.J.Goodnight & M.L.Goodnight, 1947
- Prionostemma transversale Roewer, 1953
- Prionostemma tristani (Banks, 1909)
- Prionostemma turki Roewer, 1953
- Prionostemma umbrosum Roewer, 1953
- Prionostemma usigillatum Mello-Leitão, 1938
- Prionostemma victoriae C.J.Goodnight & M.L.Goodnight, 1946
- Prionostemma vittatum Roewer, 1910
- Prionostemma wagneri C.J.Goodnight & M.L.Goodnight, 1944
- Prionostemma waltei Roewer, 1953
- Prionostemma yungarum Ringuelet, 1962
