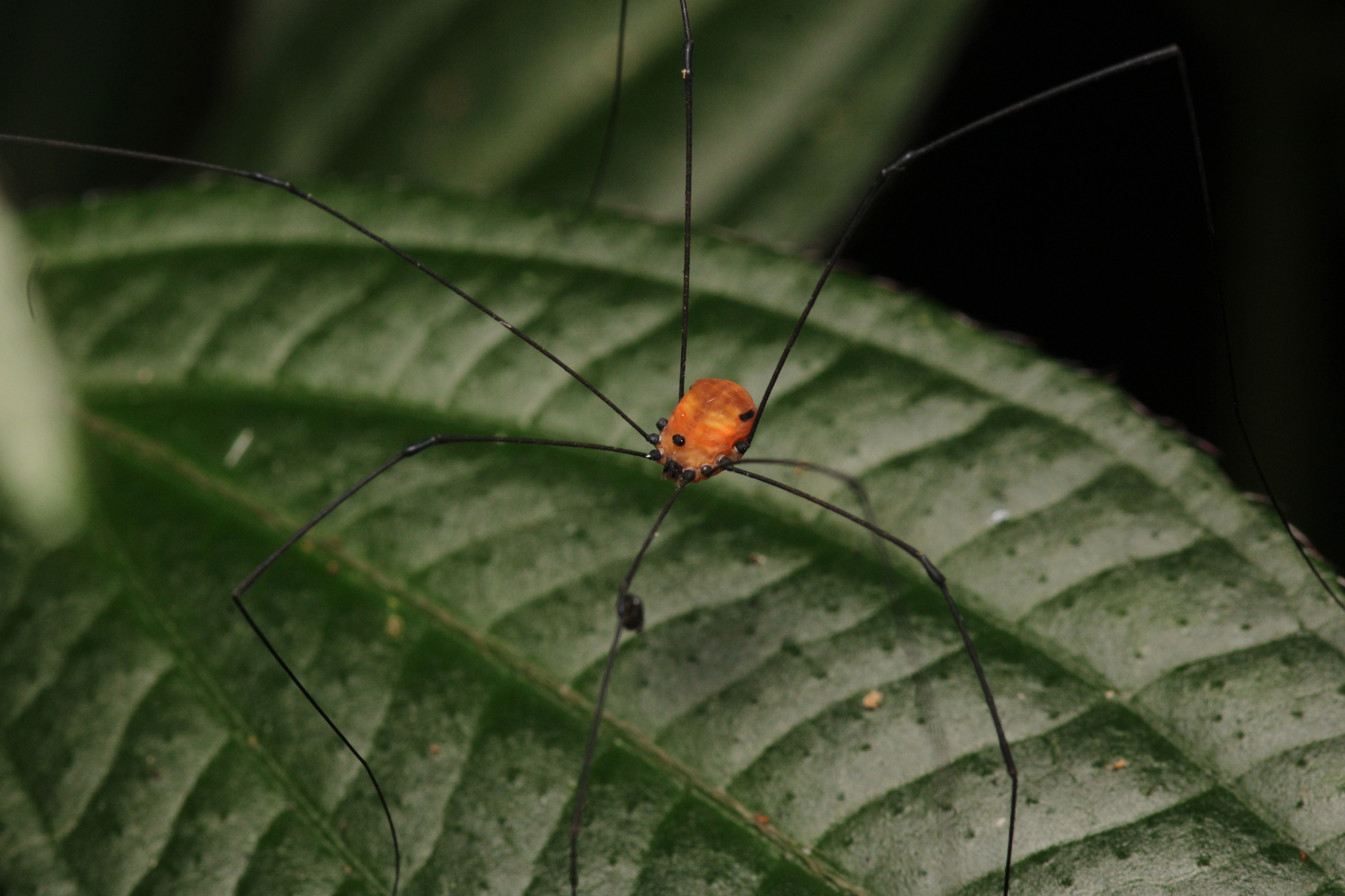
- Holcobunus nigripalpis

Scientific classification
- Domain: Eukaryota
- Kingdom: Animalia
- Phylum: Arthropoda
- Subphylum: Chelicerata
- Class: Arachnida
- Order: Opiliones
- Family: Sclerosomatidae
- Subfamily: Gagrellinae
- Genus: Holcobunus; Roewer, 1910

Species
- See text

= Holcobunus =

Genus of arachnids (harvestmen/daddy longlegs)

Holcobunus is a genus of the order Opiliones in the family Sclerosomatidae. The genus was first described by Roewer, 1910

== Species ==
Holcobunus contains the following species, per World Catalog of Opiliones, 2023:

- Holcobunus albianus Mello-Leitão, 1944 - Brazil
- Holcobunus bicornutus Mello-Leitão, 1940 - Brazil
- Holcobunus bogotensis Roewer, 1953 - Colombia
- Holcobunus chilensis Piza, 1942 - Chile
- Holcobunus cinctus Roewer, 1953 - Colombia
- Holcobunus conspersus Roewer, 1953 - Bolivia
- Holcobunus dentatus Roewer, 1910 - Brazil
- Holcobunus dissimilis Tourinho, Pinto-da-Rocha & Bragagnolo, 2015 - Brazil
- Holcobunus dubius Ringuelet, 1960 - Argentina
- Holcobunus formosus (Ringuelet, 1953) - Argentina (implicit transfer)
- Holcobunus ibitirama Tourinho, Pinto-da-Rocha & Bragagnolo, 2015 - Brazil
- Holcobunus iguassuensis Mello-Leitão, 1935 - Brazil
- Holcobunus laevis Ringuelet, 1960 [1959?] - Argentina
- [Unsure generic status] Holcobunus luteipalpis Roewer 1910 - Brazil (See under Abaetetuba)]
- Holcobunus marmoratus Mello-Leitão, 1938 - Brazil
- Holcobunus metallicus Roewer, 1953 - Bolivia
- Holcobunus mexicanus Roewer, 1953 - Mexico
- Holcobunus misionicus Ringuelet, 1959 - Argentina
- Holcobunus nigripalpis Roewer, 1910 - Brazil
- Holcobunus riedeli Starega, 1970 - Cuba
- Holcobunus segadasi Mello-Leitão, 1949 - Brazil
- Holcobunus tenuis Roewer, 1953 - Honduras
- Holcobunus tocantinus Roewer 1953 - Brazil
- Holcobunus trochanteralis Roewer 1953 - Brazil
- Holcobunus uaisoh Tourinho, Pinto-da-Rocha & Bragagnolo, 2015 - Brazil
- Holcobunus unicolor (Loman, 1902) - Bolivia
- Holcobunus unifasciatus Roewer 1910 - Colombia

For other species such as Holcobunus geniculatus, Holcobunus insperatus, Holcobunus littoralis, then see alternative genera such as Garleppa
