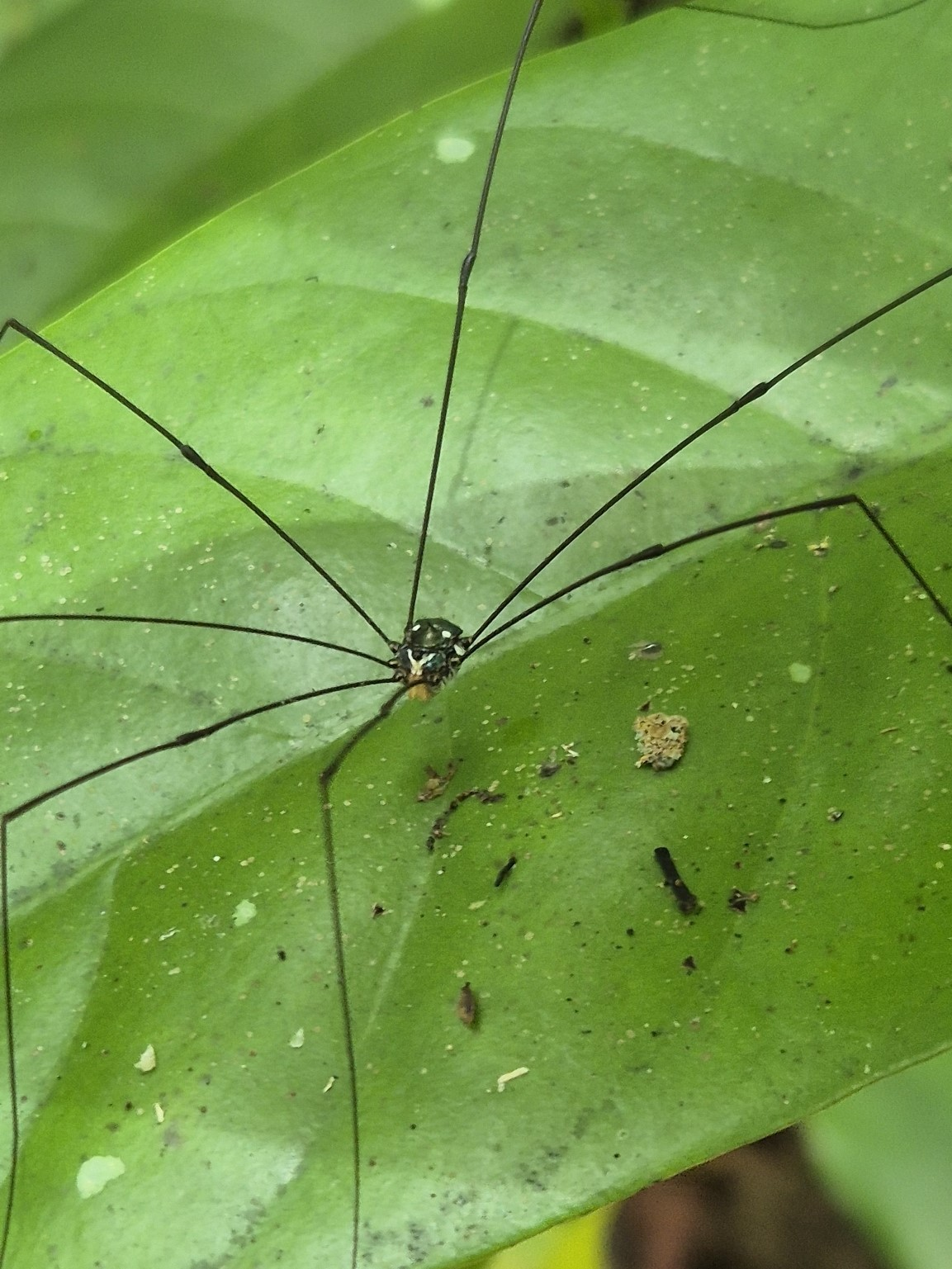
- Pseudogagrella amamiana

Scientific classification
- Kingdom: Animalia
- Phylum: Arthropoda
- Subphylum: Chelicerata
- Class: Arachnida
- Order: Opiliones
- Family: Sclerosomatidae
- Subfamily: Gagrellinae
- Genus: Pseudogagrella; Redikorzev, 1936

= Pseudogagrella =

Genus of harvestmen/daddy longlegs

Pseudogagrella is a genus of harvestmen in the family Sclerosomatidae from East Asia.

== Species ==
- Pseudogagrella amamiana (Nakatsudi, 1942) - Japan
- Pseudogagrella andoi Suzuki, 1977 - Taiwan
- Pseudogagrella arishana Suzuki, 1977 - Taiwan
- Pseudogagrella chekiangensis Wang, 1941 - China
- Pseudogagrella cyanea (Roewer, 1915) - Taiwan, Japan
- Pseudogagrella dorsomaculata Chen & Shih, 2017 - Taiwan
- Pseudogagrella minuta Roewer, 1957 - China
- Pseudogagrella multimaculata Roewer, 1957 - Indonesia
- Pseudogagrella nigridorsa Chen & Shih, 2017 - Taiwan
- Pseudogagrella pingi Wang, 1941 - China
- Pseudogagrella sakishimensis Suzuki, 1971 - Japan
- Pseudogagrella sauteri Chen & Shih, 2017 - Taiwan
- Pseudogagrella similis Wang, 1941 - China
- Pseudogagrella sinensis Redikorzev, 1936 - China
- Pseudogagrella splendens (With, 1903) - China, Japan
- Pseudogagrella taiwana Suzuki, 1977 - Taiwan
- Pseudogagrella wangi Roewer, 1957 - China
