= Carmenia =

Scientific classification
- Kingdom: Animalia
- Phylum: Arthropoda
- Subphylum: Chelicerata
- Class: Arachnida
- Order: Opiliones
- Family: Sclerosomatidae
- Subfamily: Gagrellinae
- Genus: Carmenia; Roewer, 1915
- Species: C. bunifrons

Binomial name
- Carmenia bunifrons Roewer, 1915

Species of harvestman in the family Sclerosomatidae

Carmenia bunifrons is a species of harvestman and the sole member of the monotypic genus Carmenia, in the family Sclerosomatidae. It is native to Colombia and was first described by Roewer in 1915.
