= Terceira Metade =

Brazilian reality television show

- Genre: Reality
- Presented by: Deborah Secco
- Starring: Regina Navarro Lins
- Country of origin: Brazil
- Original language: Portuguese
- No. of seasons: 1
- No. of episodes: 11

Production
- Production locations: Uruçuca, Bahia
- Camera setup: Multiple-camera
- Running time: 49–58 minutes

Original release
- Network: Globoplay
- Release: July 18, 2025

Related
- Couple to Throuple

Terceira Metade (English: Third Half) is a Brazilian dating reality series created and produced by Globoplay in partnership with Boxfish, which premiered on July 18, 2025.

Hosted by Deborah Secco and featuring guidance from sexologist and author Regina Navarro Lins, the show follows committed couples open to expanding their relationship, who are joined by single participants interested in becoming part of a throuple.

== Format ==
In the first stage of the experiment, all cast members live in a beachfront house, where initial connections begin to form between the couples and potential third partners. Once trios are established, they move in together, sharing the same space and daily routine. In the final phase, each trio must decide the future of their relationship: continue as a throuple, return to life as a couple, or part ways entirely.

== Cast ==
The original 17 cast members were revealed on July 7, 2025, by Globoplay. The lineup featured four couples and nine singles. In episode 4, three additional singles and one couple joined the experiment, bringing the total number of housemates to 22.

=== Couples ===
Cast member	Age	Hometown	Entered	Exited	Result		Reunion
Dhara Gonçalves	26	São Paulo	Episode 1	Episode 10	Throuple	Lori	Together as Couple
Yago Soniga	28	Bauru	Episode 1	Episode 10	Throuple	Lori	Together as Couple
Jéssica "Jhessi" Vieira	32	Curitiba	Episode 1	Episode 10	Throuple	Monique	Together as Couple
Marlom Sucuma	33	Guinea-Bissau	Episode 1	Episode 10	Throuple	Monique	Together as Couple
Louise Veronica	28	São Paulo	Episode 4	Episode 10	Throuple	Ingride	Together as Couple
Rafael "Rafa" Canedo	37	São Paulo	Episode 4	Episode 10	Throuple	Ingride	Together as Couple
Ana Carolina Mello	28	Brasília	Episode 1	Episode 7	Walked	Walked	Separated
Mauro Poggi	33	Brasília	Episode 1	Episode 7	Walked	Walked	Separated
Beatriz "Bia" Santos	25	São Paulo	Episode 1	Episode 4	Eliminated	Eliminated	Separated
Liah Mattos	38	Patos de Minas	Episode 1	Episode 4	Eliminated	Eliminated	Separated

=== Singles ===
Cast member	Age	Hometown	Entered	Exited	Result		Reunion
Lori Clari	26	(Italy) Anzio	Episode 1	Episode 10	Throuple	Dhara & Yago	Single
Monique Reis	21	Salvador	Episode 1	Episode 10	Throuple	Jhessi & Marlon	Couple with Jhessi
Ingride Mota	26	Barão de Grajaú	Episode 4	Episode 10	Throuple	Louise & Rafa	Single
Artú Medeiros	31	Maceió	Episode 1	Episode 7	Eliminated	Eliminated	
Camila Crimberg	28	Olímpia	Episode 1	Episode 7	Eliminated	Eliminated	
Cielle Santos	32	Botucatu	Episode 1	Episode 7	Eliminated	Eliminated	
Hélyo Felipe Borges	25	São Paulo	Episode 1	Episode 7	Eliminated	Eliminated	
Igor José	31	Natal	Episode 1	Episode 7	Eliminated	Eliminated	
Ruan Jhulius	28	Prado	Episode 1	Episode 7	Eliminated	Eliminated	
Tiago Miranda	27	Salvador	Episode 4	Episode 7	Eliminated	Eliminated	
Zyllus	31	São João de Meriti	Episode 1	Episode 7	Eliminated	Eliminated	
Guilherme "Gui" Pan	33	São Vicente	Episode 4	Episode 5	Walked	Walked	

== Key ceremony history ==
During the first phase, the Key Ceremony takes place, where couples have the opportunity to choose a single cast member (among those who have shown interest) for an overnight date in the couple's suite. At the end of this phase, each couple offers the key to the shared home to the single they've chosen, where the trio will live together during the final phase of the experiment.

	First phase					Final phase	
	Episode 1	Episode 3	Episode 5	Episode 6	Episode 7	Episode 10	Episode 11
	Episode 1	Episode 3	Episode 5	Episode 6	Episode 7	Finale	Reunion
Dhara & Yago	Lori	Lori	Lori	Lori	Lori	Throuple (Episode 10)	Couple (Episode 11)
Jhessi & Marlon	Monique	Zyllus	Couple	Monique	Monique	Throuple (Episode 10)	Couple (Episode 11)
Louise & Rafa	Not in the Experiment		Cielle	Ingride	Ingride	Throuple (Episode 10)	Couple (Episode 11)
Ana & Mauro	Camila	Igor	Couple	Igor	Walked (Episode 7)		Separated (Episode 11)
Bia & Liah	Cielle	Felipe	Eliminated (Episode 5)				Separated (Episode 11)
Notes	none		1, 2	none	3	4	none

=== Notes ===
- ^Note 1: Due to their inability to develop healthy connections, the production team decided to eliminate Bia & Liah in order to preserve their relationship.
- ^Note 2: With their first choices blocked, Ana & Mauro and Jhessi & Marlon decided not to choose anyone for their dates and remained as couples only.
- ^Note 3: Due to Ana's doubts and the couple's uncertainty, Ana & Mauro chose to leave the experiment in the first phase to protect their relationship.
- ^Note 4: In the finale, each trio have to decide the future of their relationship: continue as a throuple, return to life as a couple, or part ways entirely.

== Episodes ==
Season	Episodes	Originally released	
Season	Episodes	First released	Last released
1	11	July 18, 2025	August 8, 2025

=== Season 1 (2025) ===
No. overall	No. in season	Title	Original release date
Week 1
1	1	"Uma Equação em que Três É Par"	July 18, 2025
2	2	"Foi Aqui que Pediram Marmita?"	July 18, 2025
3	3	"Cardápio do Dia - Rodízio de DR"	July 18, 2025
Week 2
4	4	"VTzeiros Também Amam"	July 25, 2025
5	5	"Clima Tenso Entre os Mores"	July 25, 2025
6	6	"Me Chama de Eleição e me Faz de Boca de Urna!"	July 25, 2025
7	7	"É Preciso Saber Parar"	July 25, 2025
Week 3
8	8	"Linhas Cruzadas de um Mapa Astral de Trisal"	August 1, 2025
9	9	"Fica, Vai Ter Torta de Climão"	August 1, 2025
10	10	"A Três, A Dois ou A Sós?"	August 1, 2025
Week 4
11	11	"Verdades Não Ditas: O Reencontro"	August 8, 2025
