= Tetraceratobunus =

Scientific classification
- Kingdom: Animalia
- Phylum: Arthropoda
- Subphylum: Chelicerata
- Class: Arachnida
- Order: Opiliones
- Family: Sclerosomatidae
- Subfamily: Gagrellinae
- Genus: Tetraceratobunus; Roewer, 1915

Genus of harvestmen

Tetraceratobunus is a genus of harvestmen in the family Sclerosomatidae from South Asia.

== Species ==
- Tetraceratobunus lineatus Roewer, 1915
- Tetraceratobunus lithobius Roewer, 1955
- Tetraceratobunus marmoratus Roewer, 1955
