= Baía de Camamu Environmental Protection Area =

Protected area in Bahia, Brazil

- Área de Proteção Ambiental da Baía de Camamu
- IUCN category V (protected landscape/seascape)
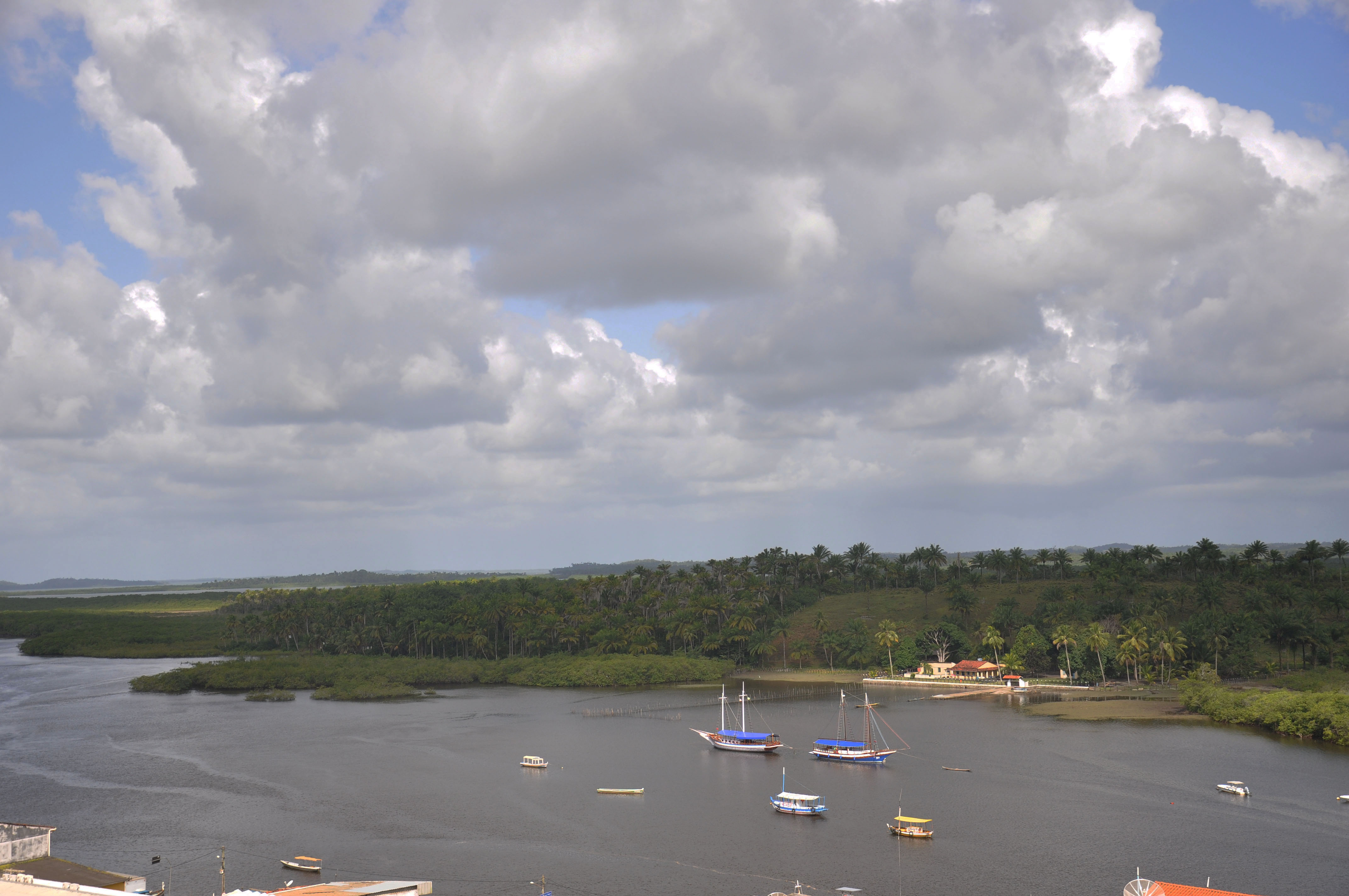
- Baía de Camamu

- Location within Brazil
- Nearest city: Camamu, Bahia
- Coordinates: 13.928202°S 39.030722°W
- Area: 118,000 hectares (290,000 acres)
- Designation: Environmental protection area
- Created: 27 February 2002
- Administrator: INEMA: Instituto do Meio Ambiente e Recursos Hídricos

The Baía de Camamu Environmental Protection Area (Portuguese: Área de Proteção Ambiental da Baía de Camamu) is an environmental protection area in the state of Bahia, Brazil. It tries to preserve the natural vegetation of mangroves, restinga and Atlantic Forest around the Camamu Bay (Baía de Camamu).

== Location ==
The Baía de Camamu Environmental Protection Area (APA) is divided between the municipalities of Camamu (33.28%), Igrapiúna (2.52%), Itacaré (14.88%) and Maraú (49.32%) in Bahia. (Note: The percentages of land in each municipality are calculated by the Instituto Socioambiental from the polygon defining the APA. The decree creating the APA does not mention the municipality of Igrapiúna, which holds 2.52% of the polygon.) It covers an area of 118,000 hectares (290,000 acres) including land, water, islands and reefs. Settlements include the seaside village of Barra Grande on the Ponta do Mutá and the city of Camamu within the bay. The APA adjoins the Itacaré / Serra Grande Environmental Protection Area to the south and the Caminhos Ecológicos da Boa Esperança Environmental Protection Area to the north.

== Environment ==
Camamu Bay (Baía de Camamu) is about 24 by 43 kilometres (15 by 27 mi) in the Palm Coast (Costa do Dendê) region. It is the third largest bay in Brazil, and is known for its scenic beauty and ecological importance. The APA contains islands, the 8 kilometres (5.0 mi) long Cassange lagoon, the Tremembé waterfalls and the Saquaíra and Algodões beaches. Vegetation includes restinga, extensive mangroves and remnants of Atlantic Forest in an advanced state of regeneration Threats include destruction of the mangroves, drainage of wetlands to build condominiums, illegal occupation of permanently preserved areas and replacement of the native vegetation by coconut monocultures.

== History ==
The Baía de Camamu Environmental Protection Area was created by state governor decree 8.175 of 27 February 2002. The purpose is to preserve the mangroves, ensure the genetic diversity of native flora and fauna, protect fresh, brackish and salt water, regulate land use and occupation, promote development of sustainable socio-economic activities, combat overfishing and protect the remaining rain forest. The APA became part of the Central Atlantic Forest Ecological Corridor, created later in 2002.

== Sources ==
- APA da Baía de Camamu (in Portuguese), INEMA: Instituto do Meio Ambiente e Recursos Hídricos
- APA da Baía de Camamu (in Portuguese), ISA: Instituto Socioambiental
- Borges, César; Ferreira, Sérgio; Carreira, Luiz (27 February 2002), Decreto nº 8.175 de 27 de fevereiro de 2002 (in Portuguese)
- Gestão Costeira Carta 09 Baía de Todos os Santos (PDF) (in Portuguese), MMA
- Lamas, Ivana Reis; Crepaldi, Maria Otávia; Mesquita, Carlos Alberto Bernardo (2015), Uma Rede no Corredor (PDF) (in Portuguese), Conservação Internacional (CI-Brasil), ISBN 978-85-98830-28-5
