= Aragao =

Brazilian footballer (born 1986)

Personal information
- Full name: Alejandro Aragao Da Cruz
- Date of birth: January 28, 1986 (age 40)
- Place of birth: Gandu, Brazil
- Position: Forward

Senior career*
Years	Team	Apps	(Gls)
2004–2005	Salernitana	0	(0)
2005–2006	Ballaria Igea Marina	19	(3)
2006–2007	Castelnuovo	22	(3)
2007–2008	San Marino Calcio	8	(0)
2008–2012	Virtus Casarano		
2012–	Gallipoli Calcio		
- * Club domestic league appearances and goals

Alejandro Aragao Da Cruz (born 28 January 1986 in Gandu, Brazil), known as just Aragao, is a Brazilian footballer. He plays as a forward. He is currently unattached.
