= Camamu =

Municipality of Bahia, Brazil

Coordinates: 13°57′S 39°07′W

- Municipality
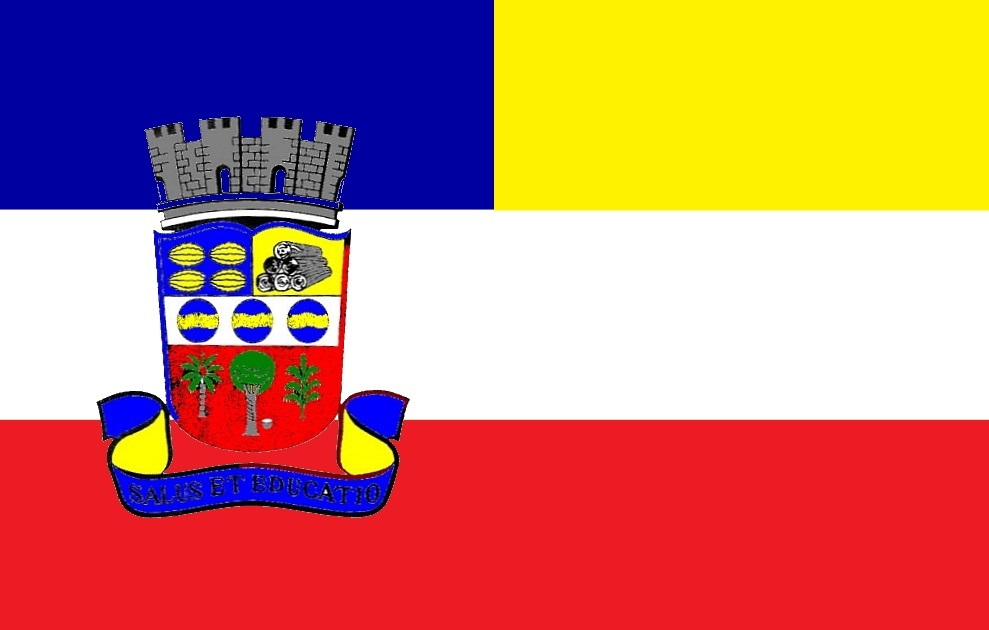
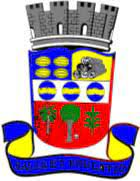
- Flag Coat of arms

- Municipality of Camamu in Bahia state
- Country: Brazil
- Region: Nordeste
- State: Bahia

Area
  - Total: 341.8 sq mi (885.2 km^{2})

Population (2020)
  - Total: 35,382
- Time zone: UTC−3 (BRT)

Camamu is a municipality in the state of Bahia, Brazil. Politically, it is in the Valença subregion of the Sul Baiano region. It is located on the southern coast of Bahia state, the Costa do Dendê (Palm Coast), along the BA-001 highway. The municipality covers an area of 885.20 km^{2}, and, in a 2020 estimate, it had 35,382 inhabitants.

== History ==
The region was originally inhabited by native Macamamus Indians. The name Camamu was the name of the Indians' village. In 1560 the Jesuits established a mission, that the next in year, upon completion of the chapel, was converted into a parish with the name "Aldeia de Nossa Senhora da Assunção de Macamamu". On 22 May 1693 the village was elevated to town status with the name of Camamu. And finally, on June 27, 1891, it officially became a city.

Like many coastal towns, Camamu was built at two levels. In the upper town were the churches and colonial houses, while down by the harbor were the commercial establishments.

The town grew rich as the area became the largest producer of cassava in Brazil, and it became the target of pirates and invaders such as the Dutch. From 1624 to 1627 the town suffered several attacks by the Dutch. To protect itself from further incursions, the inhabitants blocked the passage to the harbor with huge rocks, that forced boats to zigzag in the channel in order to reach the port. The rocks remain in place today.

In 1782, by order of the Portuguese Crown, the pioneer João Gonçalves da Costa opened the first road connecting Camamu with inland settlements. Because of its importance to the economic life of the province, it became known as the "Estrada das Nações" ("Road of Nations").

In 1961, Camamu municipality was subdivided with a portion remaining in Camamu and a portion becoming the municipality of Ibirapitanga.

In 2008 the Comptroller General in his audit cited municipal officials for widespread corruption.

== Geography ==
Pedra Furada Island and the Maraú Peninsula enclose a deep bay, Camamu Bay (Baía de Camamu), in which the town of Camamu is located. Highway BA-650 runs west to the city of Ibirapitanga.

The municipality contains 33.28% of the 118,000-hectare (290,000-acre) Baía de Camamu Environmental Protection Area, created in 2002.

== Economy ==
The area produces rubber and baryte is mined. The major agricultural product is cattle.

== See also ==
- List of municipalities in Bahia
