= Abaetetuba (harvestman) =

Scientific classification
- Domain: Eukaryota
- Kingdom: Animalia
- Phylum: Arthropoda
- Subphylum: Chelicerata
- Class: Arachnida
- Order: Opiliones
- Family: Sclerosomatidae
- Subfamily: Gagrellinae
- Genus: Abaetetuba; Tourinho-Davis, 2004

Species
- See text

Genus of harvestmen/daddy longlegs

Abaetetuba is a genus of harvestmen in the family Sclerosomatidae.

== Species ==
- Abaetetuba bahiensis (Mello-Leitão, 1931)
- Abaetetuba citrina (Pocock, 1903)
- Abaetetuba lisei Tourinho-Davis, 2004
- Abaetetuba luteipalpis (Roewer, 1910)
- Abaetetuba plaumanni (Roewer, 1953)
