= Lagoa Encantada e Rio Almada Environmental Protection Area =

Protected area in Bahia, Brazil

- Área de Proteção Ambiental da Lagoa Encantada e Rio Almada
- IUCN category V (protected landscape/seascape)
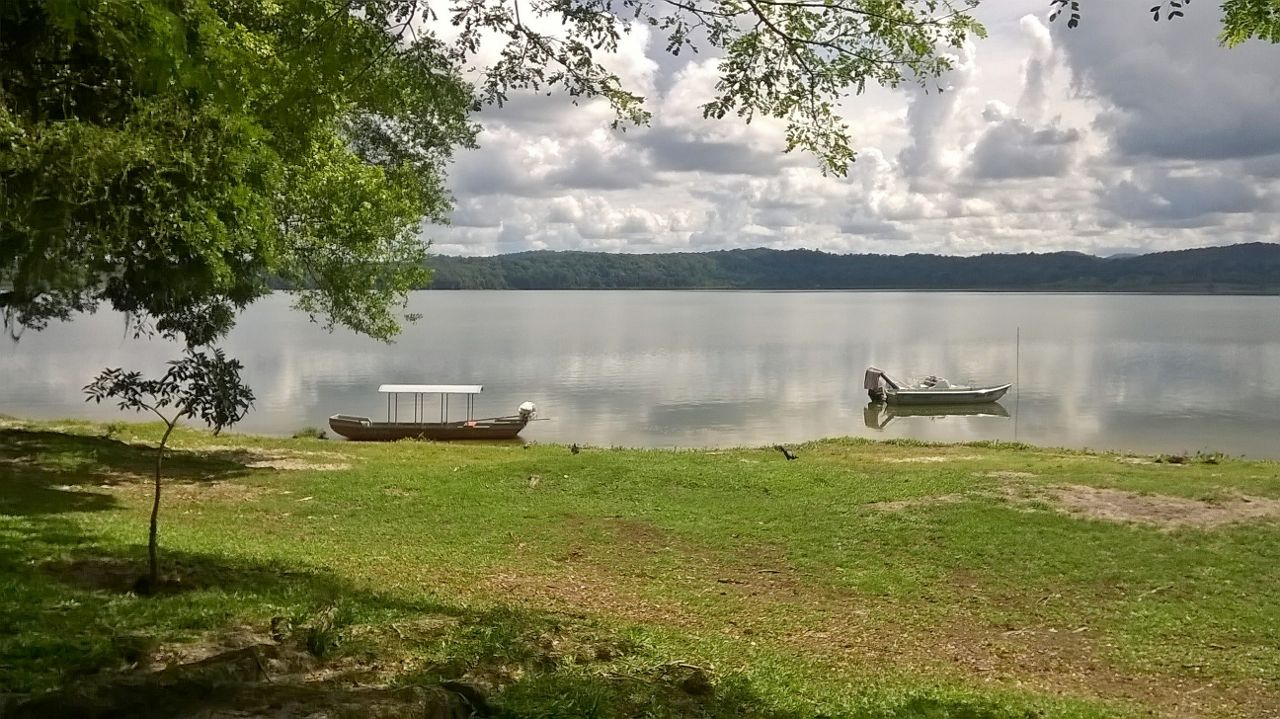
- Lagoa Encantada

- Location within Brazil
- Nearest city: Uruçuca, Bahia
- Coordinates: 14°38′10″S 39°08′31″W
- Area: 157,745 hectares (389,800 acres)
- Designation: Environmental protection area
- Created: 14 June 1993
- Administrator: Instituto do Meio Ambiente e Recursos Hídricos – INEMA / BA

The Lagoa Encantada e Rio Almada Environmental Protection Area (Portuguese: Área de Proteção Ambiental da Lagoa Encantada e Rio Almada) is an environmental protection area in the state of Bahia, Brazil.

== Location ==
The Lagoa Encantada e Rio Almada Environmental Protection Area covers lands to the north and south of the Almada River in Bahia. It has an area of 157,745 hectares (389,800 acres), and protects part of the Almada River basin. It covers the northern coast of the municipality of Ilhéus, and parts of the municipalities of Uruçuca, Itajuípe, Coaraci and Almadina on the south coast of Bahia.

The reserve is named for a beautiful lagoon, the Lagoa Encantada, that is formed by the Pipite and Caldeiras rivers. It has areas of Atlantic Forest, with waterfalls, springs and caves, and a has restingas and mangroves on the Atlantic coast. The APA is threatened by water pollution from sewage and garbage, since most of the communities have no sanitation. There are irregular settlements of squatters in the coastal area. Other threats include irregular fishing, deforestation, fires, hunting and the illegal trade in wild animals.

== History ==
The Lagoa Encantada e Rio Almada Environmental Protection Area was created by state governor decree 2.217 of 14 June 1993. A management plan was issued in 1998, and a revised plan in 2002. It became part of the Central Atlantic Forest Ecological Corridor, created in 2002. It was expanded by state governor decree 8650 of 22 September 2003.

== Sources ==
- APA Lagoa Encantada e Rio Almada (in Portuguese), INEMA, archived from the original on 2016-10-27
- Lamas, Ivana Reis; Crepaldi, Maria Otávia; Mesquita, Carlos Alberto Bernardo (2015), Uma Rede no Corredor (PDF) (in Portuguese), Conservação Internacional (CI-Brasil), ISBN 978-85-98830-28-5
- Zoneamento Apa da Lagoa Encantada e do Rio Almada (PDF) (in Portuguese), INEMA, 2013
