= Piraí do Norte =

Municipality in Northeast, Brazil

Coordinates: 13°45′S 39°22′W

- Municipality
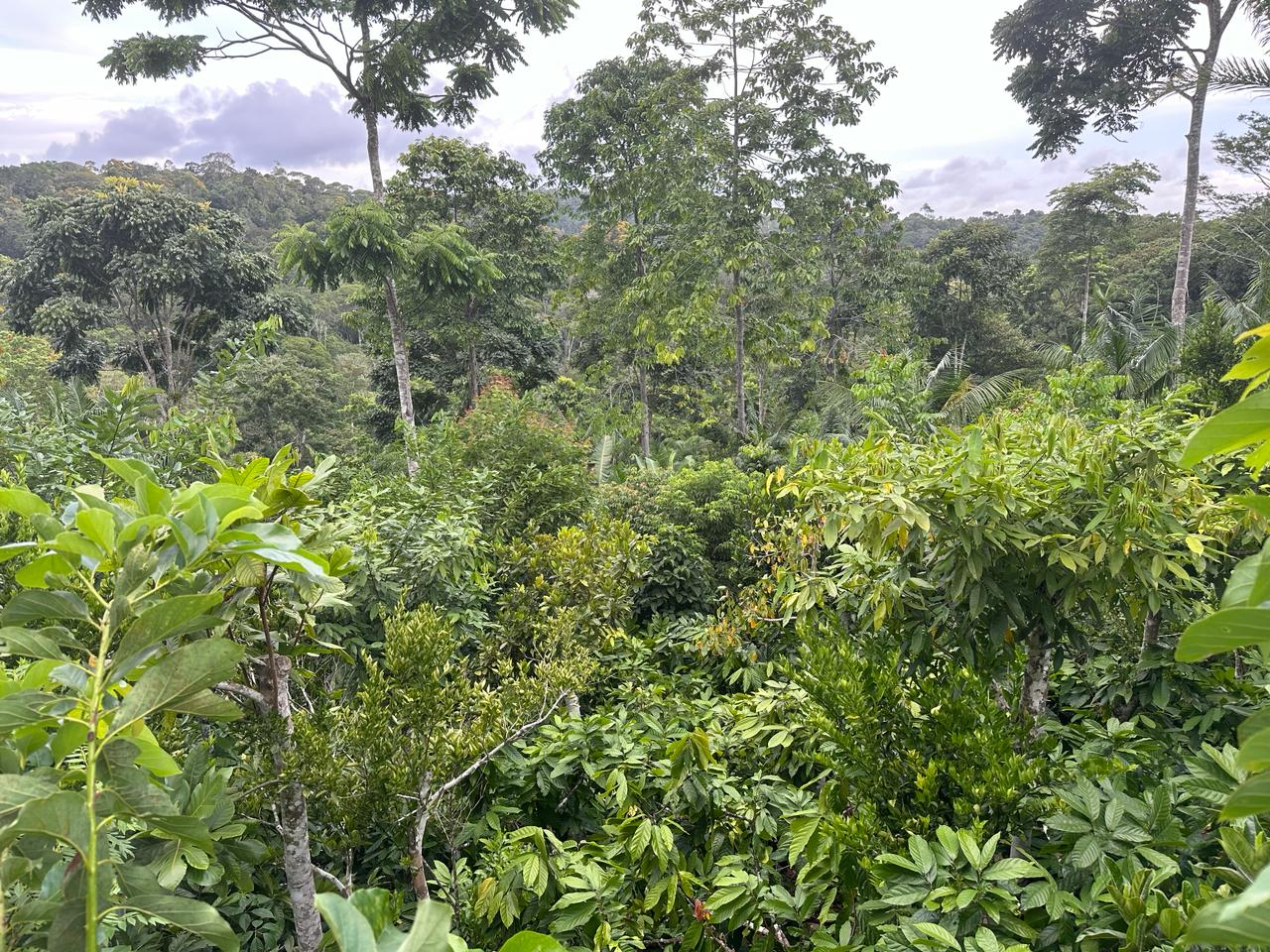

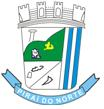
- Coat of arms

- Coordinates: -13.80928, -39.37263
- Country: Brazil
- Region: Nordeste
- State: Bahia

Area
  - Total: 74.7 sq mi (193.4 km^{2})

Population (2020)
  - Total: 10,036
  - Density: 135.5/sq mi (52.32/km^{2})
- Time zone: UTC−3 (BRT)

Piraí do Norte is a municipality in the state of Bahia in the North-East region of Brazil. Its estimated population in 2020 was 10,036 inhabitants and is located 320 km away from the state capital. It has an area of 193.4 km^{2} (74.7 sq mi). Its main source of income is cocoa culture.

== Etymology ==
The term "Piraí" comes from the Tupi language, meaning "fish river", through the junction of pirá (fish) and 'y (river). The expression "from the North" was added to differentiate the municipality of the municipality of Piraí, in the state of Rio de Janeiro.

== Origin ==
Old Piraí do Norte Chapel, the municipality of Piraí do Norte owes its appearance to the choice of its area as a stopping point for troops transporting various items from the cities located on the coast, especially Santarém and Valença.

Because of the dangers of traveling at night, it was more prudent to stay overnight in the ranch and continue the following day's trip. The adoption of this village as a point of support was one of the reasons that Piraí do Norte exists.

The geographical location of the ranch was a contributory factor for it to evolve into a village, since it was an exact half day trip from Gandu and a day coming from Santarém, besides having an ideal infrastructure for the tropeiros, that is, water and grass fed.

There are some controversies about who was the first inhabitant, but some credit the pioneering to Manoel Romualdo Santana, who would have built the first permanent housing in the city. Soon afterwards, some caboclos would have arrived and also their first merchant, João Soares Silva.

At that time, that street was no longer a mere ranchery to become a small warehouse of goods, since João Soares worked in the dry and wet tissue business, buying and selling products from the region, thus inferring that other people would come that ruined one, besides the tropeiros originating of the cities of the coast.

The priests soon erected a chapel for the catechesis of the Indians who passed by, coming from the area where today is the city of Ibirapitanga, the former Cachoeira do Pau, and the tropeiros, each time in greater numbers. After the construction of the chapel, the river started to have a name, being called the Chapel of the Rio do Peixe, for being the main building and being next to a very fishy river.

== See also ==
- List of municipalities in Bahia
