= Coaraci =

Municipality of Bahia, Brazil

Coordinates: 14°38′S 39°32′W

- Municipality
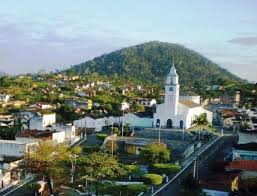
- View of Coaraci

- Location in Bahia
- Country: Brazil
- Region: Nordeste
- State: Bahia

Population (2020)
  - Total: 16,549
- Time zone: UTC−3 (BRT)

Coaraci is a municipality in the state of Bahia in the North-East region of Brazil.

The municipality contains part of the 157,745-hectare (389,800-acre) Lagoa Encantada e Rio Almada Environmental Protection Area, created in 1993.

== See also ==
- List of municipalities in Bahia
