= Itajuípe =

Municipality of Bahia, Brazil

Coordinates: 14°41′S 39°22′W

- Municipality
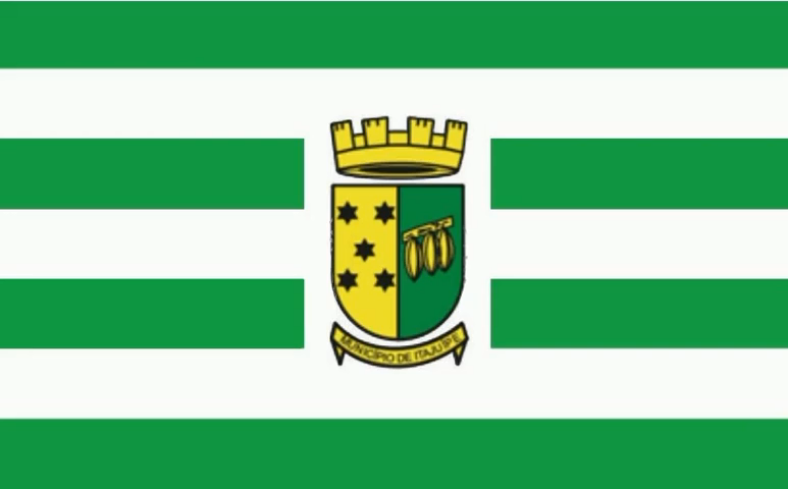
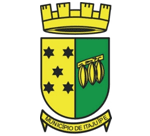
- Flag Coat of arms

- Country: Brazil
- Region: Nordeste
- State: Bahia
- Founded: 12 December 1952

Population (2020)
  - Total: 20,398
- Time zone: UTC−3 (BRT)

Itajuípe is a municipality in the state of Bahia in the North-East region of Brazil.

The municipality contains part of the 157,745-hectare (389,800-acre) Lagoa Encantada e Rio Almada Environmental Protection Area, created in 1993.

== See also ==
- List of municipalities in Bahia
