= Gandu, Brazil =

Municipality of Bahia, Brazil

Gandu Município de Gandu
- Municipality
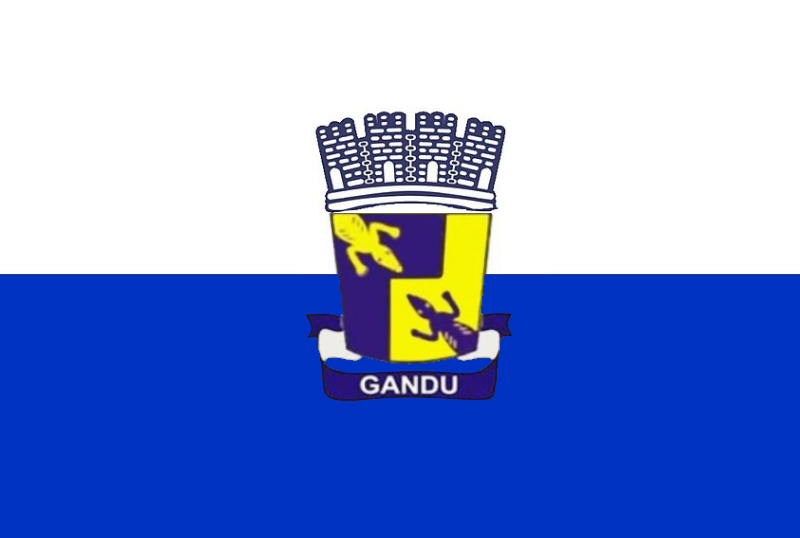
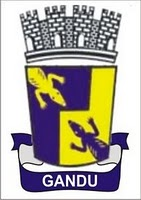
- Flag Coat of arms

- Location of Gandu in Bahia

- Location of Gandu in the Brazil
- Coordinates: 13°44′38″S 39°29′13″W
- Country: Brazil
- Region: Northeast
- State: Bahia
- Founded: July 28, 1958

Government
  - Mayor: Leonardo barbosa cardosa (2017 - 2020)

Area
  - Total: 243.15 km^{2} (93.88 sq mi)

Population (2020)
  - Total: 32,596
  - Density: 134.06/km^{2} (347.21/sq mi)
- Demonym: Ganduense
- Time zone: UTC−3 (BRT)

Gandu is a municipality in the state of Bahia in the North-East region of Brazil. Gandu covers 243.15 km^{2} (93.88 mi^{2}), and has a population of 32,596 with a population density of 125 inhabitants per square kilometer. Gandu has its origin as Fazenda Corujão, a farm purchased in 1912 by José Amado Costa for the cultivation of cocoa. Corujão became a district of the municipality of Ituberá in 1958, and an independent municipality on July 18, 1962.

== Notable people ==
- Alejandro Aragao Da Cruz
