= Garleppa =

Scientific classification
- Kingdom: Animalia
- Phylum: Arthropoda
- Subphylum: Chelicerata
- Class: Arachnida
- Order: Opiliones
- Family: Sclerosomatidae
- Subfamily: Gagrellinae
- Genus: Garleppa; Roewer, 1812

Species
- See text

Genus of arachnids (harvestmen/daddy longlegs)

Garleppa is a genus of the order Opiliones in the family Sclerosomatidae. The genus was first described by Roewer, 1912

== Species ==
Garleppa contains the following species, per World Catalog of Opiliones, 2023:

- Garleppa geniculata Mello-Leitão, 1938 - Brazil
- Garleppa granulata Roewer, 1912- Bolivia
- Garleppa insperata Soares, 1972 - Brazil
- Garleppa littoralis Mello-Leitão, 1938 - Brazil
