= Igrapiúna =

Municipality of Bahia, Brazil

Coordinates: 13°49′S 39°09′W

- Municipality
- Country: Brazil
- Region: Nordeste
- State: Bahia

Population (2020)
  - Total: 13,091
- Time zone: UTC−3 (BRT)

Igrapiúna is a municipality in the state of Bahia in the North-East region of Brazil.

The municipality contains 2.52% of the 118,000-hectare (290,000-acre) Baía de Camamu Environmental Protection Area, created in 2002.

== See also ==
- List of municipalities in Bahia
