= Ubaitaba =

Coordinates: 14°18′S 39°20′W

- Municipality
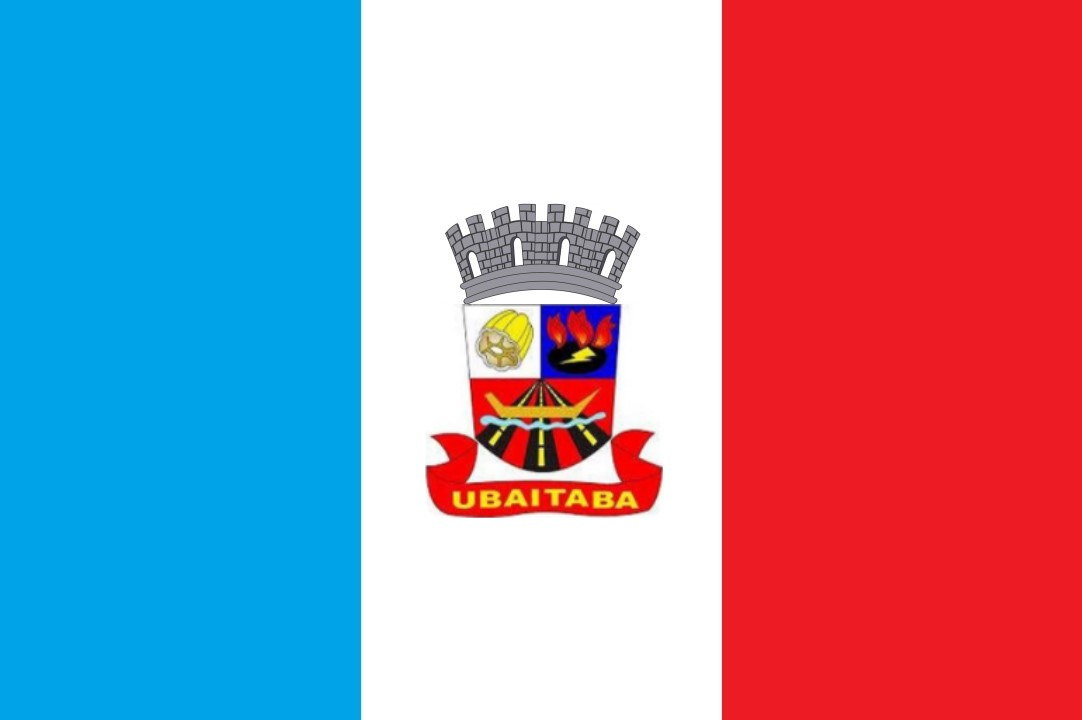
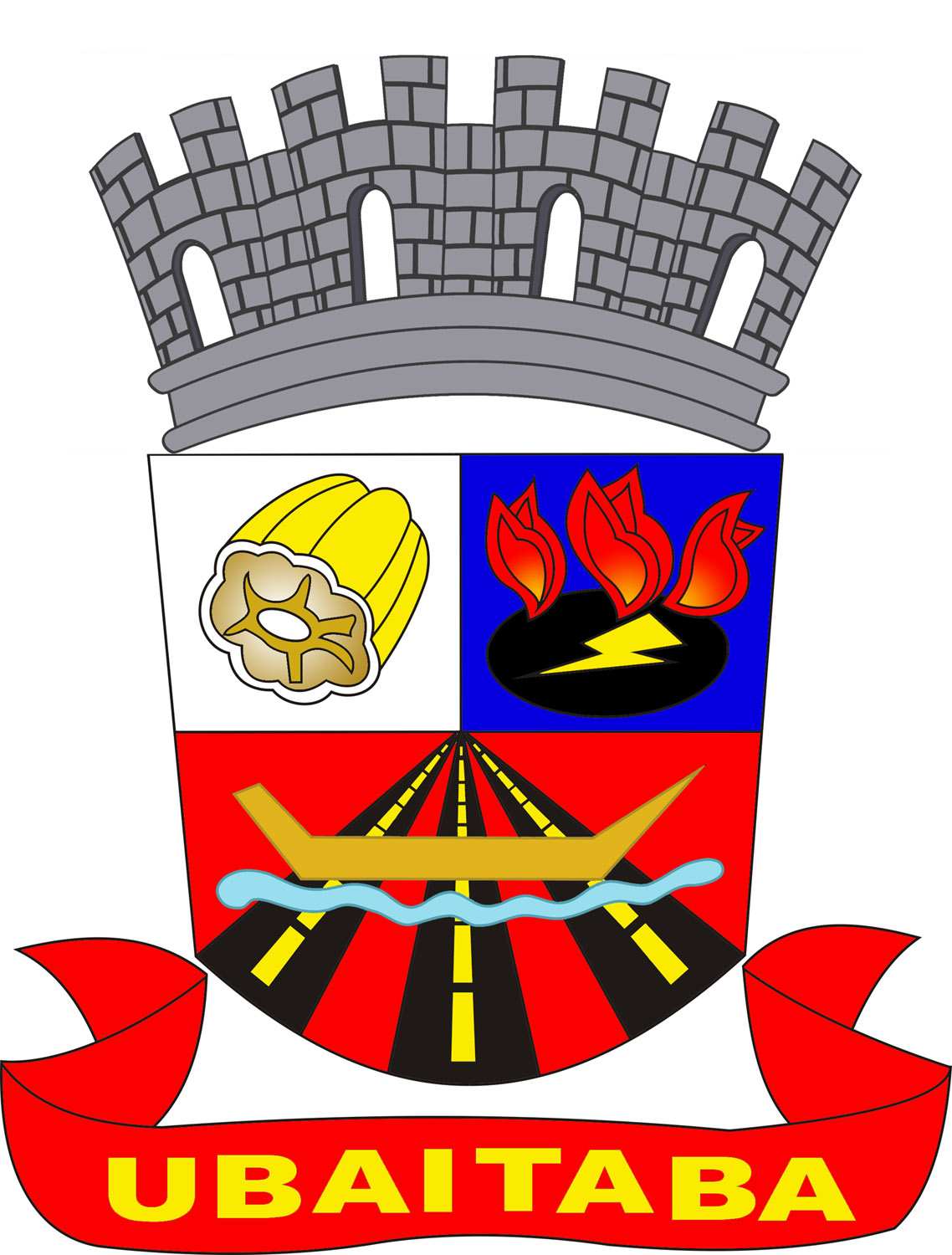
- Flag Coat of arms

- Country: Brazil
- Region: Nordeste
- State: Bahia

Population (2022)
  - Total: 17,596
- Time zone: UTC−3 (BRT)

Ubaitaba is a municipality in the state of Bahia in the North-East region of Brazil.

== See also ==
- List of municipalities in Bahia
