= Al-Madina (Israeli newspaper) =

Weekly newspaper

Al-Madina المدينة
- Almadina cover
- Type: Weekly newspaper
- Format: Tabloid
- Owner(s): Rana Asali
- Founder(s): Kamil Silbak
- Founded: 2004
- Language: Arabic
- Headquarters: Haifa, Israel
- Country: Israel
- Circulation: 27,000
- Website: www.almadina.co.il

Al-Madina (Arabic: المدينة, meaning The City) is an Arabic local newspaper, printed weekly in tabloid format, published and distributed for free in Israel.

== History ==
Al-Madina appears in two editions. One edition is published in Haifa and distributed in the north of Israel in 15,000 copies since 2004. Its editor-in-chief is Firas Khatib. Until 2006, the editor-in-chief was Ala Hlehel, an Arab-Israeli writer and two-time winner of the A. M. Qattan Foundation Literature Awards. The other edition is published in Tel Aviv, with 12,000 copies distributed throughout central Israel since 2006. The editor-in-chief is Ghaleb Kiwan, who is also a news reporter for Arabic-language broadcasts on the Israeli cable provider HOT.

In addition to international, national and local news coverage, the paper publishes opinion pieces and articles on health, sports, arts and culture.

== See also ==
- Newspapers in Israel
- Palestinians
- Arab citizens of Israel
