= Almadina, Bahia =

Municipality of Bahia, Brazil

Almadina Município de Almadina
- Municipality
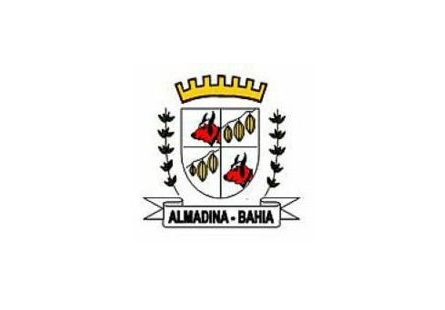
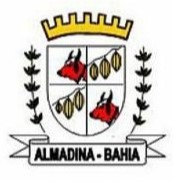
- Flag Coat of arms

- Location of Almadina in Bahia

- Location of Almadina in Brazil
- Coordinates: 14°42′18″S 39°38′13″W
- Country: Brazil
- Region: Northeast
- State: Bahia
- Founded: September 1, 1934

Government
  - Mayor: Milton Cerqueira

Area
  - Total: 245.27 km^{2} (94.70 sq mi)
- Elevation: 870 m (2,850 ft)

Population (2020)
  - Total: 5,366
  - Density: 21.88/km^{2} (56.66/sq mi)
- Demonym: Almadinense
- Time zone: UTC−3 (BRT)

Almadina, Bahia is a municipality in the state of Bahia in the North-East region of Brazil. Almadina covers 245.27 km^{2} (94.70 mi^{2}), and has a population of 5,366 with a population density of 25 inhabitants per square kilometer.

The municipality contains part of the 157,745-hectare (389,800-acre) Lagoa Encantada e Rio Almada Environmental Protection Area, created in 1993.

== See also ==
- List of municipalities in Bahia
