= Uruçuca =

Coordinates: 14°35′S 39°16′W

- Municipality
- Location in Bahia
- Country: Brazil
- Region: Nordeste
- State: Bahia

Population (2020)
  - Total: 20,413
- Time zone: UTC−3 (BRT)

Uruçuca is a municipality in the state of Bahia in the North-East region of Brazil.

The municipality contains 44% of the 9,275-hectare (22,920-acre) Serra do Conduru State Park, created in 1997. It also contains part of the 157,745-hectare (389,800-acre) Lagoa Encantada e Rio Almada Environmental Protection Area, created in 1993.

== See also ==
- List of municipalities in Bahia
