= Ilhéus =

Municipality of Bahia, Brazil

- Municipality
- The Municipality of São Jorge dos Ilhéos
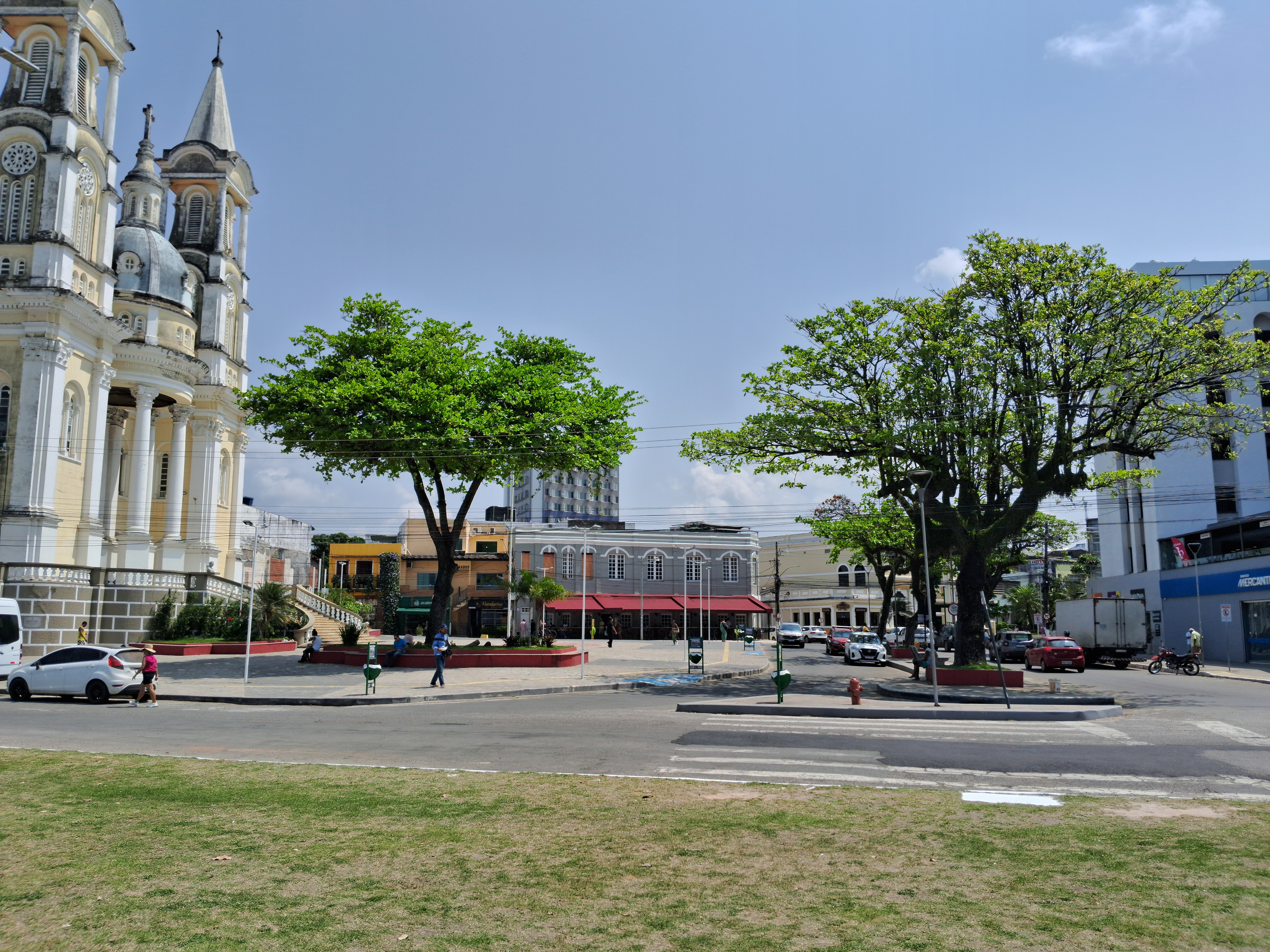

- Flag Coat of arms
- Nickname: Princesinha do Sul (Little Princess of the South)
- Location of Ilhéus
- Coordinates: 14°47′20″S 39°02′56″W
- Country: Brazil
- Region: Nordeste
- State: Bahia
- Founded: 28 June 1536

Government
  - Mayor: Valderico Luiz Dos Reis Júnior (Brazil Union 2015-)

Area
  - Total: 1,588.555 km^{2} (613.345 sq mi)
- Elevation: 52 m (171 ft)

Population (2022 Brazilian Census)
  - Total: 178,649
  - Estimate (2025): 189,149
  - Density: 112.460/km^{2} (291.270/sq mi)
- Time zone: UTC−3 (BRT)

Ilhéus (Portuguese: [iˈʎɛws]) is a major city located in the southern coastal region of Bahia, Brazil, 211 km south of Salvador, the state's capital. The city was founded in 1534 as Vila de São Jorge dos Ilhéus and is known as one of the most important tourism centers of the northeast of Brazil.

== Geography ==
As of 2020 Ilhéus had approximately 159,923 inhabitants, with an area of 1850 km^{2}, and its downtown is located 1 km away from the Atlantic Ocean.

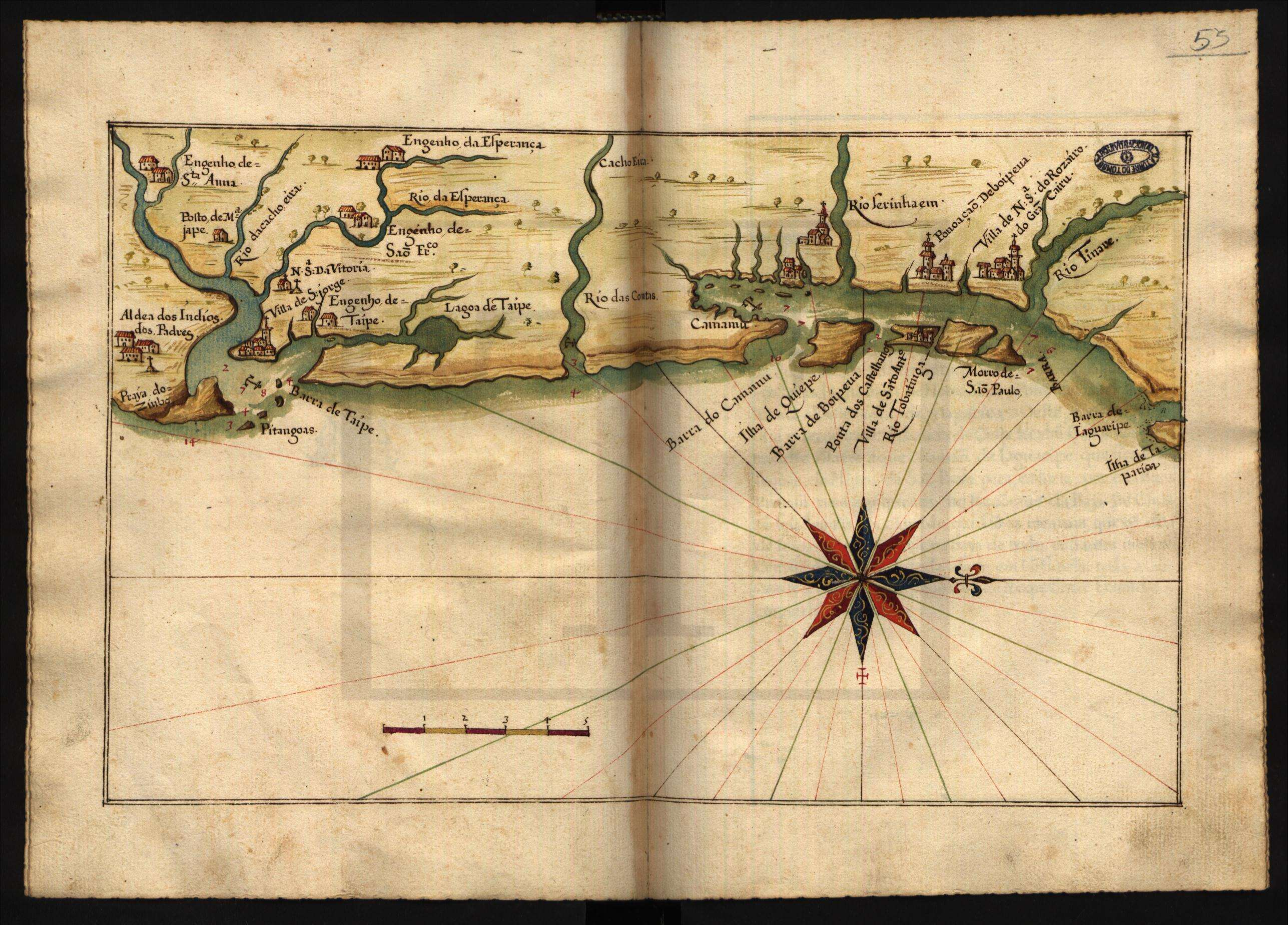
Map of the Captaincy of Ilhéus 1640

=== Climate ===
Ilhéus has a tropical rainforest climate (Köppen: Af).

Climate data for Ilhéus
Month	Jan	Feb	Mar	Apr	May	Jun	Jul	Aug	Sep	Oct	Nov	Dec	Year
Record high °C (°F)	34.1 (93.4)	33.6 (92.5)	32.2 (90.0)	31.3 (88.3)	30.6 (87.1)	29.0 (84.2)	28.4 (83.1)	28.4 (83.1)	29.0 (84.2)	30.4 (86.7)	30.0 (86.0)	30.6 (87.1)	34.1 (93.4)
Mean daily maximum °C (°F)	29.1 (84.4)	29.3 (84.7)	29.4 (84.9)	28.7 (83.7)	27.5 (81.5)	26.4 (79.5)	25.8 (78.4)	26.0 (78.8)	26.4 (79.5)	27.6 (81.7)	27.8 (82.0)	28.5 (83.3)	27.7 (81.9)
Daily mean °C (°F)	25.9 (78.6)	26.0 (78.8)	25.9 (78.6)	25.3 (77.5)	24.1 (75.4)	22.7 (72.9)	22.0 (71.6)	22.2 (72.0)	23.2 (73.8)	24.4 (75.9)	24.9 (76.8)	25.4 (77.7)	24.3 (75.8)
Mean daily minimum °C (°F)	22.2 (72.0)	22.3 (72.1)	22.1 (71.8)	21.8 (71.2)	20.9 (69.6)	19.7 (67.5)	18.9 (66.0)	18.7 (65.7)	19.7 (67.5)	20.9 (69.6)	21.5 (70.7)	22.1 (71.8)	20.9 (69.6)
Record low °C (°F)	18.3 (64.9)	18.1 (64.6)	19.1 (66.4)	18.4 (65.1)	16.1 (61.0)	15.0 (59.0)	14.4 (57.9)	12.8 (55.0)	15.4 (59.7)	16.5 (61.7)	17.7 (63.9)	18.7 (65.7)	12.8 (55.0)
Average precipitation mm (inches)	151.2 (5.95)	182.4 (7.18)	216.9 (8.54)	204.7 (8.06)	144.5 (5.69)	200.6 (7.90)	200.5 (7.89)	134.4 (5.29)	128.7 (5.07)	146.9 (5.78)	146.1 (5.75)	178.6 (7.03)	2,035.5 (80.13)
Average precipitation days	15	15	17	15	14	16	18	16	13	13	14	13	179
Average relative humidity (%)	80.4	80.7	81.5	83.0	85.7	86.5	86.6	85.2	83.7	83.1	82.8	82.0	83.4
Mean monthly sunshine hours	220.2	215.6	235.9	203.4	199.8	191.3	197.7	210.8	198.5	199.5	190.2	220.2	2,483.1
Source: Instituto Nacional de Meteorologia (normal climatológica de 1961-1990; recordes de temperatura de 01/01/1961 a 31/12/1970, 01/01/1973 a 31/12/1980, 01/01/1986 a 31/03/1989 e 01/07/1992 a 30/04/1994)

=== Conservation ===
The municipality contains a small part of the 23,262-hectare (57,480-acre) Una Wildlife Refuge, which surrounds the Una Biological Reserve in the neighboring municipality of Una. It contains 15% of the 9,275-hectare (22,920-acre) Serra do Conduru State Park, created in 1997. It contains part of the 157,745-hectare (389,800-acre) Lagoa Encantada e Rio Almada Environmental Protection Area, created in 1993. The APA is threatened by water pollution from sewage and garbage, since most of the communities have no sanitation. There are irregular settlements of squatters in the coastal area. Other threats include irregular fishing, deforestation, fires, hunting and the illegal trade in wild animals.

== Economy ==
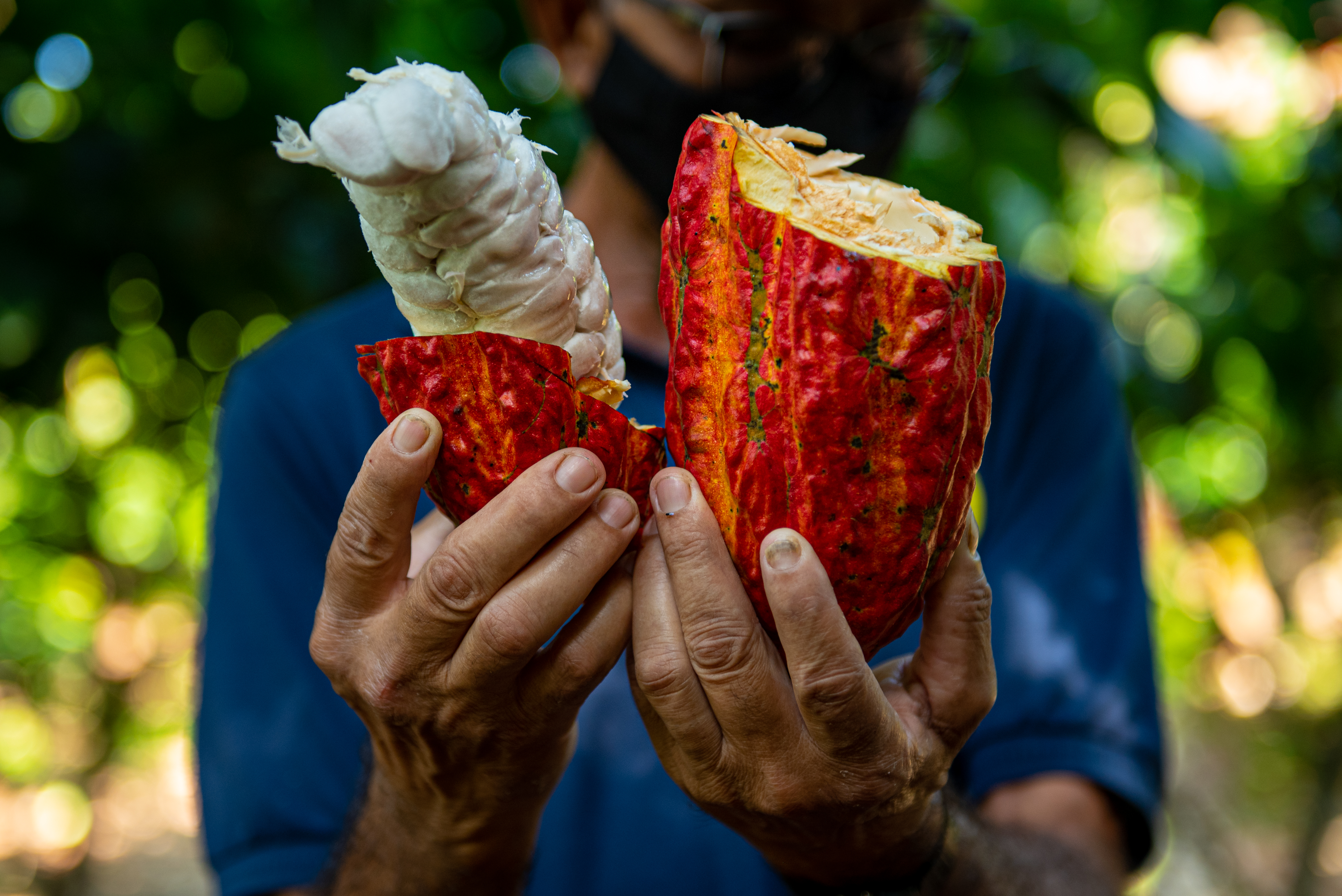
Cocoa from Provisão Farm in Ilhéus. Cocoa production has been a major challenge for farmers in the area of Bahia, where the “vassoura de bruxa” disease continues to be fought

The city was once one of the biggest exporters of cocoa beans.

The city's economy is based mainly on tourism, as a result of its beaches and cultural heritage that includes early Portuguese buildings, history and culinary distinctions, which bring to the city many Brazilian and foreign tourists.

== Urban infrastructure ==
There is a proposal for the construction of a new deep water port which due to impact has been opposed by environmental activists but has been accepted by the government as important for the economy.

== Transportation ==
- Road: BR-101 connects it to Itabuna and beyond.
- Air: Ilhéus Jorge Amado Airport with daily flights of Azul Brazilian Airlines, GOL and LATAM Brasil

with destinations Belo Horizonte-Confins (CNF), Campinas (VCP), Salvador (SSA), São Paulo-Congonhas (CGH) and São Paulo-Guarulhos (GRU).

- Sea: Port of Ilhéus.

== Culture ==
Ilhéus is the hometown of Jorge Amado, the best known writer in Brazil. He wrote over 25 novels, which were translated into 48 languages and stayed on bestseller lists in 52 countries. His novels like Gabriela, Clove and Cinnamon and Dona Flor and Her Two Husbands portray life and customs in the Northeastern region of Brazil. The plots of these and his other major works largely treat the lives of poor urban and rural black and mulatto communities of Bahia, as well as the land wars that raged in Ilhéus, where cocoa barons killed each other for power and cocoa plantations.

== Sister city ==
- (United States) Davenport, Iowa (2005)

== Notable people ==
- Ricardo Nascimento, footballer
