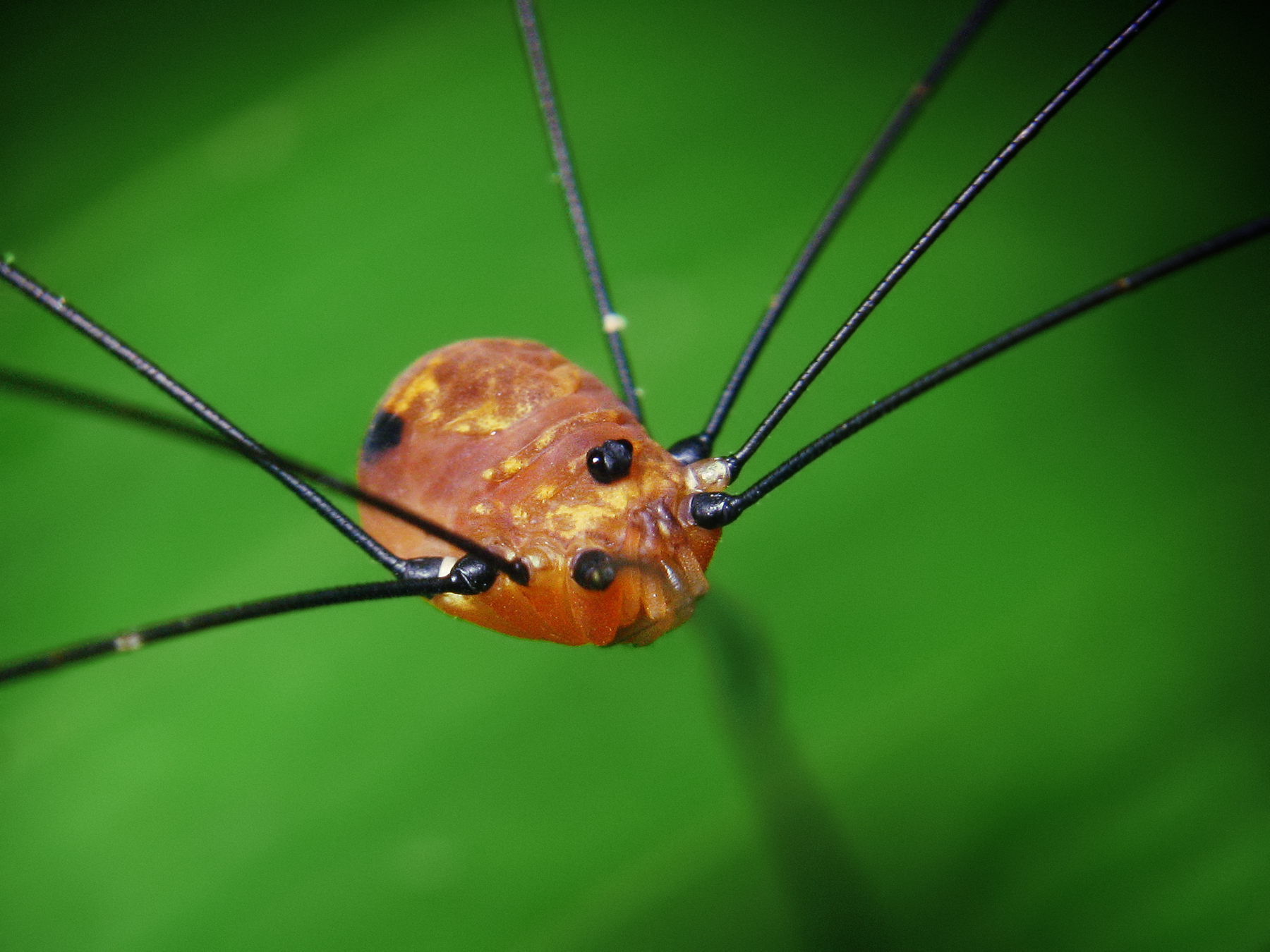

Scientific classification
- Domain: Eukaryota
- Kingdom: Animalia
- Phylum: Arthropoda
- Subphylum: Chelicerata
- Class: Arachnida
- Order: Opiliones
- Family: Sclerosomatidae
- Subfamily: Gagrellinae; Thorell, 1889

Genera
- See text

= Gagrellinae =

Subfamily of arachnids (harvestmen/daddy longlegs)

Gagrellinae is a subfamily of the order Opiliones in the family Sclerosomatidae.
