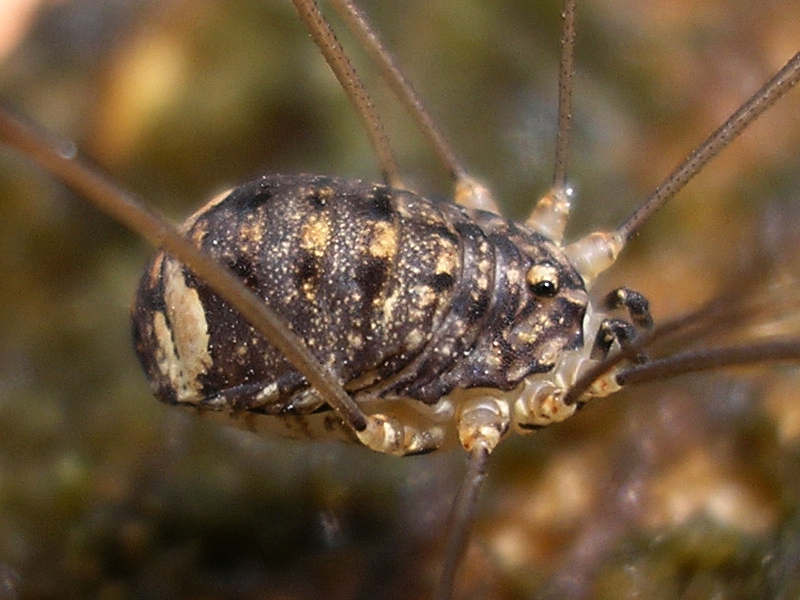
- Nelima doriae, France

Scientific classification
- Kingdom: Animalia
- Phylum: Arthropoda
- Subphylum: Chelicerata
- Class: Arachnida
- Order: Opiliones
- Superfamily: Phalangioidea
- Family: Sclerosomatidae
- Subfamily: Leiobuninae
- Genus: Nelima; Roewer, 1910

Synonyms
- Nodala Forster 1949

= Nelima =

Genus of harvestmen

Nelima is a genus of harvestmen in the family Sclerosomatidae.

== Description ==
The genus Nelima was described by Roewer, 1910. As of late 2025, the genus contains 37 species (See also older lists)

== Species ==
These species belong to the genus Nelima:

- Nelima adelheidiana Martens, 1965 – Greece
- Nelima aladjensis Mitov, 1997 – Bulgaria
- Nelima aokii Suzuki, 1974 – Japan
- Nelima atrorubra Roewer, 1910 – Spain
- Nelima coreana Suzuki, 1983 – South Korea
- Nelima cretica Roewer, 1957 – Greece (Crete)
- Nelima doriae (Canestrini, 1872) – Europe to Russia
- Nelima elegans (Weed, 1889) – USA (Eastern) to Canada
- Nelima genufusca (Karsch, 1881) – Japan (South Korea?)
- Nelima gothica Lohmander, 1945 – Europe
- Nelima hispana Martens, 1969 – Spain
- Nelima kansuensis Schenkel, 1953 – China
- Nelima lutea Roewer, 1957 – Japan
- Nelima meridionalis Marcellino, 1972 – Italy
- Nelima mexicana Goodnight & Goodnight, 1942 – Mexico (Districto Federale)
- Nelima minorica Prieto, Wijnhoven & Febrer, 2022 – Spain
- Nelima monfraguensis Wijnhoven, 2024 – Spain
- Nelima morova Goodnight & Goodnight, 1944 – Japan
- Nelima narcisi Novak & Slana, 2003 – Italy, Slovenia, Croatia
- Nelima nigricoxa Sato & Suzuki, 1939 – Japan
- Nelima nigripalpis (Simon, 1879) – France, Italy
- Nelima nigromaculata (Lucas, 1846) – Algeria
- Nelima okinawaensis Suzuki, 1964 – Japan
- Nelima paessleri (Roewer, 1910) – USA, Alaska, Oregon etc (Pacific Northwest), Canada (British Columbia)
- Nelima parva Suzuki, 1974 – Japan
- Nelima pontica Kharitonov, 1941 – Georgia, Bulgaria, Russia
- Nelima ponticoides Martens, 1969 – France (Corsica)
- Nelima recurvipenis Martens, 1969 – France (Corsica)
- Nelima saghalina Roewer, 1957 – Russia
- Nelima satoi Suzuki, 1944 – Japan
- Nelima sempronii Szalay, 1951 – Europe (Eastern and Central)
- Nelima silvatica (Simon, 1879) – Europe (Western), Algeria
- Nelima similis Suzuki, 1974 – Japan
- Nelima suzukii Tsurusaki, 2003 – Japan, Russia
- Nelima taiwana Suzuki, 1977 – Taiwan
- Nelima tancitaro Goodnight & Goodnight, 1942 – Mexico (Michoacan)
- Nelima troglodytes Roewer, 1910 – Europe (Eastern)

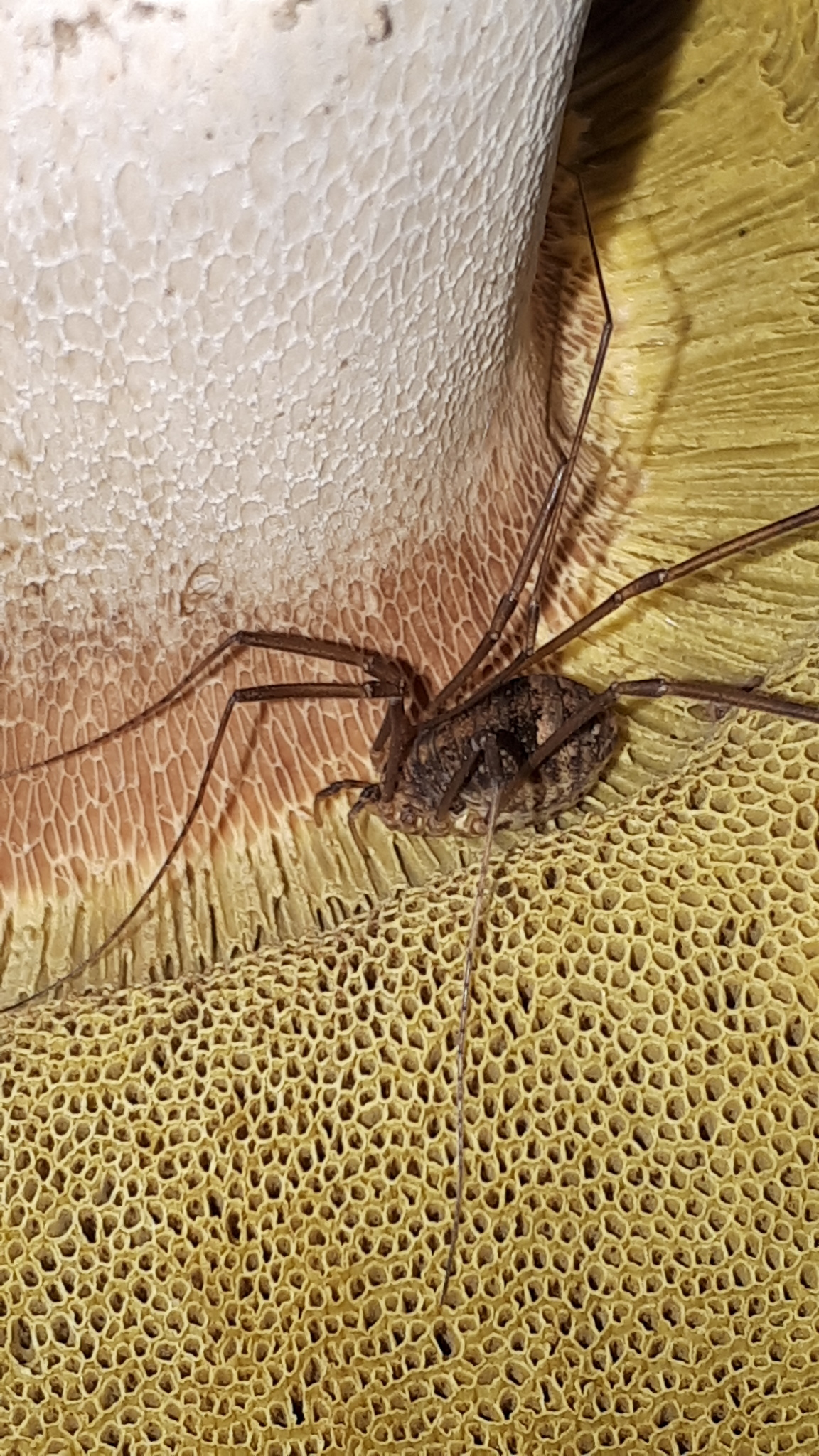
Nelima sempronii, Germany

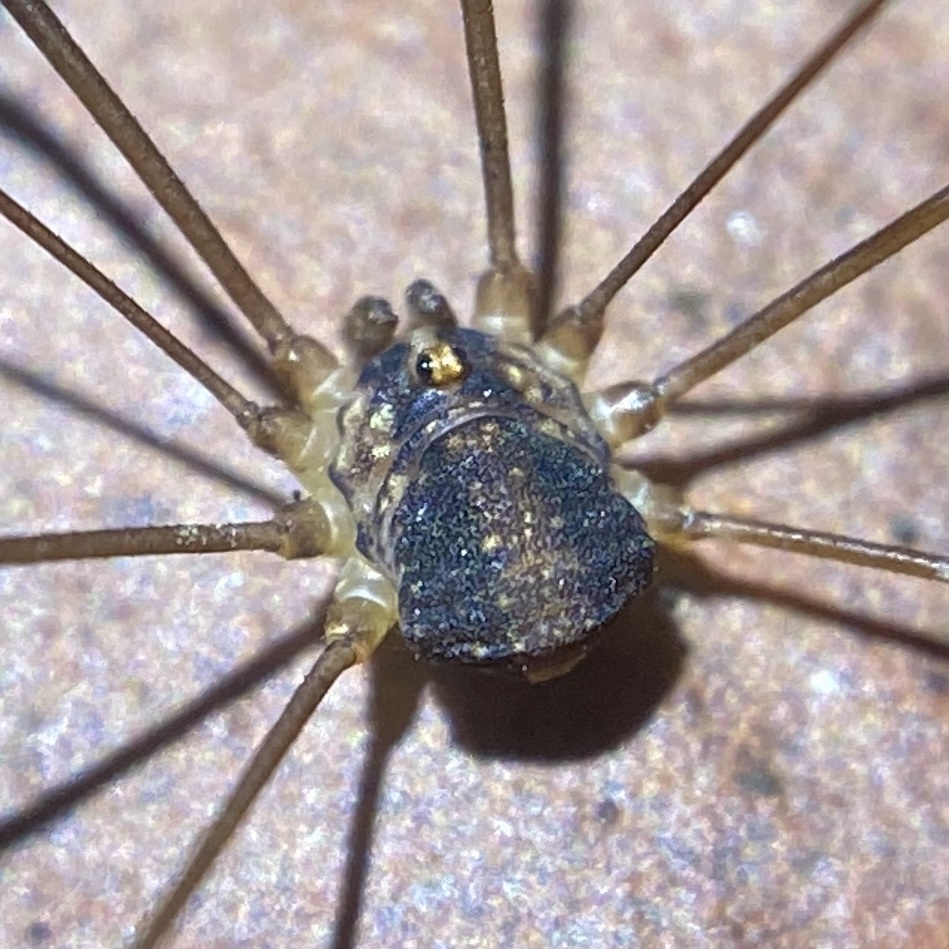
Nelima silvatica, Spain

== Selected synonyms ==
For Nelima albiangulata Roewer, 1957, plus junior synonyms Nelima insignita Roewer, 1957, and Nelima margaritata Roewer, 1957, see Nelima nigricoxa albiangulata Roewer, 1957 after Suzuki, 1986. For Nelima fuscifrons Simon 1879 per Roewer, 1910 see Leiobunum blackwalli (Meade, 1861) (Contra misdet. Leiobunum rotundum). For Nelima humilis L. Koch, 1869 see Gyas annulatus (Olivier, 1791). For Nelima melanodorsum Roewer, 1911 see Odiellus aspersus (Karsch, 1881). For Nelima valida Kishida, 1927 see Nelima genufusca genufusca (Karsch, 1881).

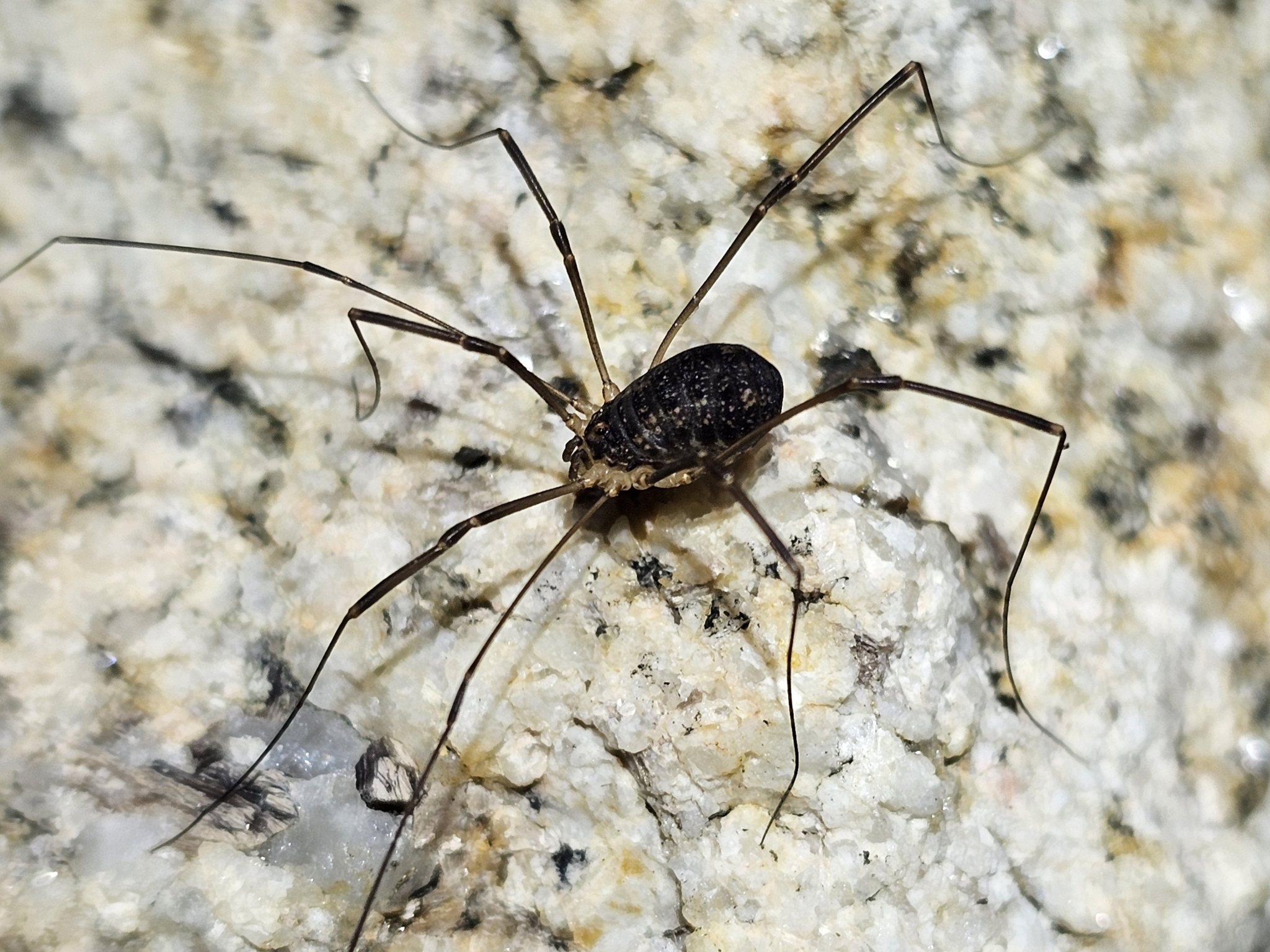
Nelima atrorubra, Spain

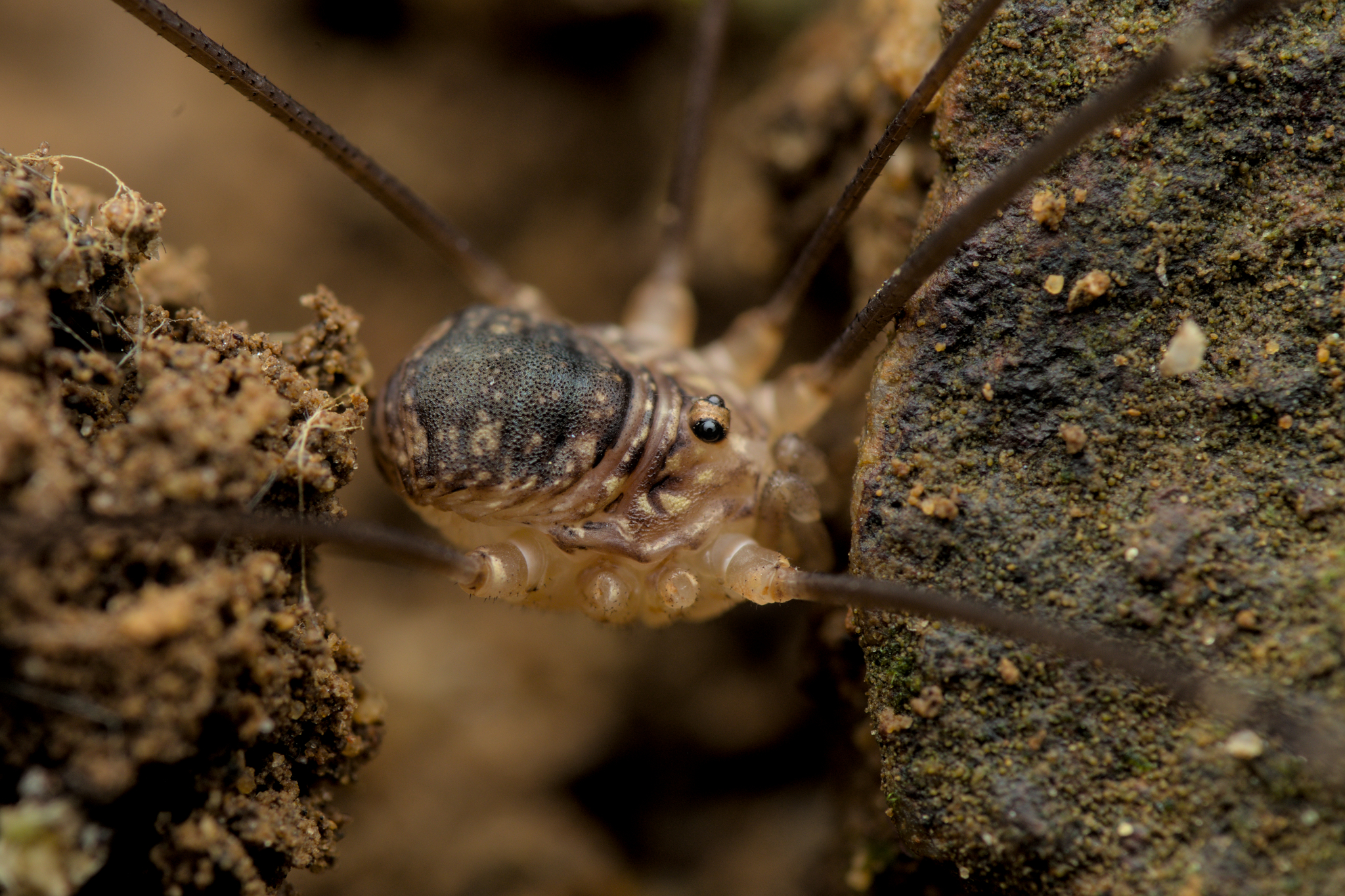
Nelima gothica, France
