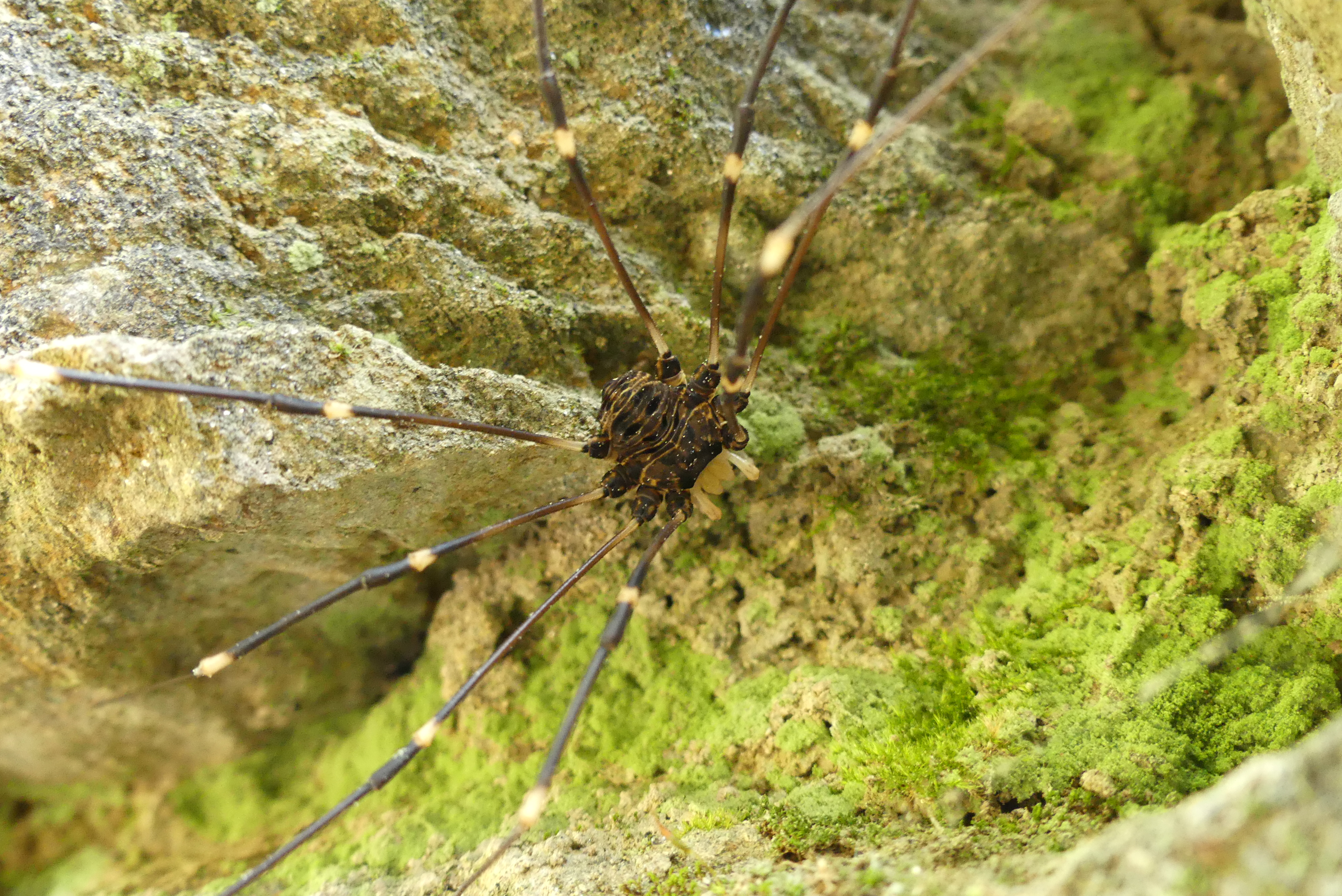

Scientific classification
- Domain: Eukaryota
- Kingdom: Animalia
- Phylum: Arthropoda
- Subphylum: Chelicerata
- Class: Arachnida
- Order: Opiliones
- Family: Sclerosomatidae
- Subfamily: Gyantinae
- Genus: Gyas
- Species: G. titanus

Binomial name
- Gyas titanus Simon, 1879

Synonyms
- Micronelima brevipes Schenkel, 1937

= Gyas titanus =

Species of harvestman

Gyas titanus is a species of harvestman found in Europe. It is the biggest European species of harvestman.

== Description ==
This species of harvestman has long, thick legs. The male's body size ranges from 7 to 8 mm and the female's from 10 to 12 mm, and it is black in both sexes. The chelicerae and pedipalps have a whitish color. The abdomen is clearly segmented and there are white lines between the segments.

== Habitat and ecology ==
This species lives close to rivers and water bodies; it always appears in habitats with constant humidity levels, avoiding direct sunlight. Immatures can be found along the year, overwintering in caves, and adults appear from June to September.
