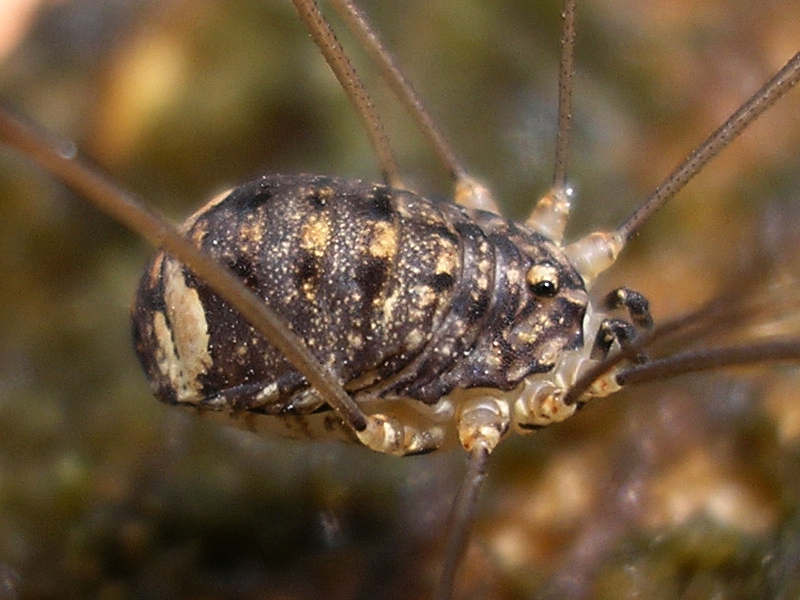
- Nelima doriae. Female

Scientific classification
- Domain: Eukaryota
- Kingdom: Animalia
- Phylum: Arthropoda
- Subphylum: Chelicerata
- Class: Arachnida
- Order: Opiliones
- Family: Sclerosomatidae
- Genus: Nelima
- Species: N. doriae

Binomial name
- Nelima doriae (Canestrini, 1871)

Synonyms
- Leiobunum doriae Canestrini, 1871; Nelima dunni Forster, 1947; Nelima maroccana Roewer, 1957; Nelima pisarskii Starega, 1966

= Nelima doriae =

Species of harvestman/daddy longlegs

Nelima doriae is a species of harvestman in the family Sclerosomatidae.

== Etymology ==
The specific name, doriae, is in honor of Italian naturalist Giacomo Doria.

== Subspecies ==
- N.d. doriae (Canestrini, 1872)
- N.d. dalmatina Hadži, 1973

== Distribution ==
This species can be found in Southern Europe. It is also present in Argentina, Australia, and New Zealand (introduced).

== Description ==
Nelima doriae can reach approximately a body length of 4 millimetres (0.16 in) in female. The upper body is dark yellowish, with round golden specks, more evident along the midline. The fourth last ring of the abdomen shows a golden transverse band. Palps and jaws are yellow. The legs are yellowish with white joints.
