= Gyas (harvestman) =

Scientific classification
- Domain: Eukaryota
- Kingdom: Animalia
- Phylum: Arthropoda
- Subphylum: Chelicerata
- Class: Arachnida
- Order: Opiliones
- Family: Sclerosomatidae
- Subfamily: Gyantinae
- Genus: Gyas; Simon, 1879

Species
- Gyas annulatus (Olivier, 1791); Gyas titanus Simon, 1879

Synonyms
- Micronelima Schenkel, 1937

Genus of harvestmen

Gyas is a genus of harvestmen in the family Sclerosomatidae.

== Species ==
Two species are recognized:

- Gyas annulatus (Olivier, 1791)
- Gyas titanus Simon, 1879
