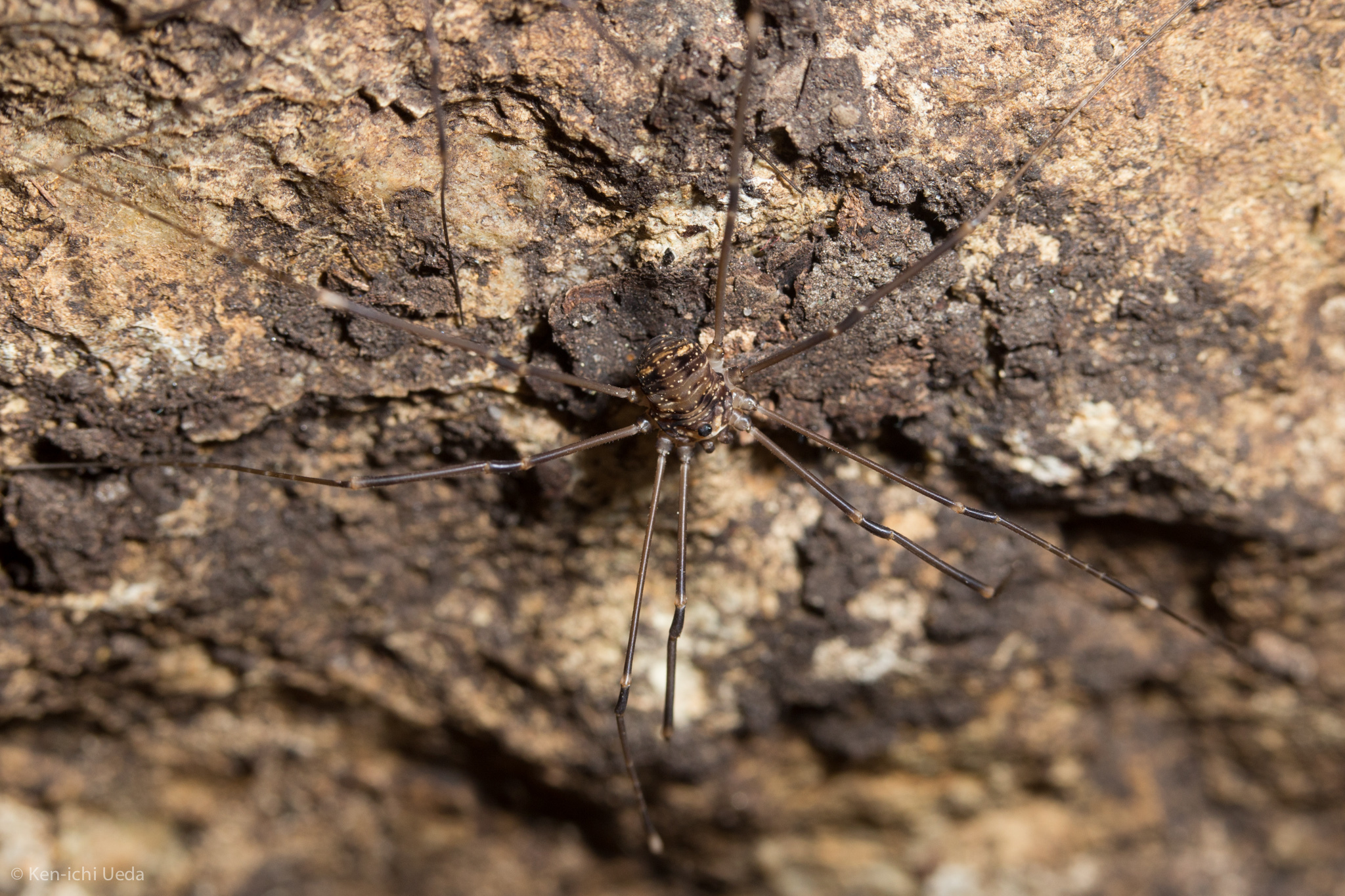

Scientific classification
- Kingdom: Animalia
- Phylum: Arthropoda
- Subphylum: Chelicerata
- Class: Arachnida
- Order: Opiliones
- Family: Sclerosomatidae
- Genus: Nelima
- Species: N. paessleri

Binomial name
- Nelima paessleri (Roewer, 1910)

= Nelima paessleri =

Species of harvestman/daddy longlegs

Nelima paessleri, the aggregating harvestmen, is a species of harvestman in the family Sclerosomatidae. It is found in North America.
