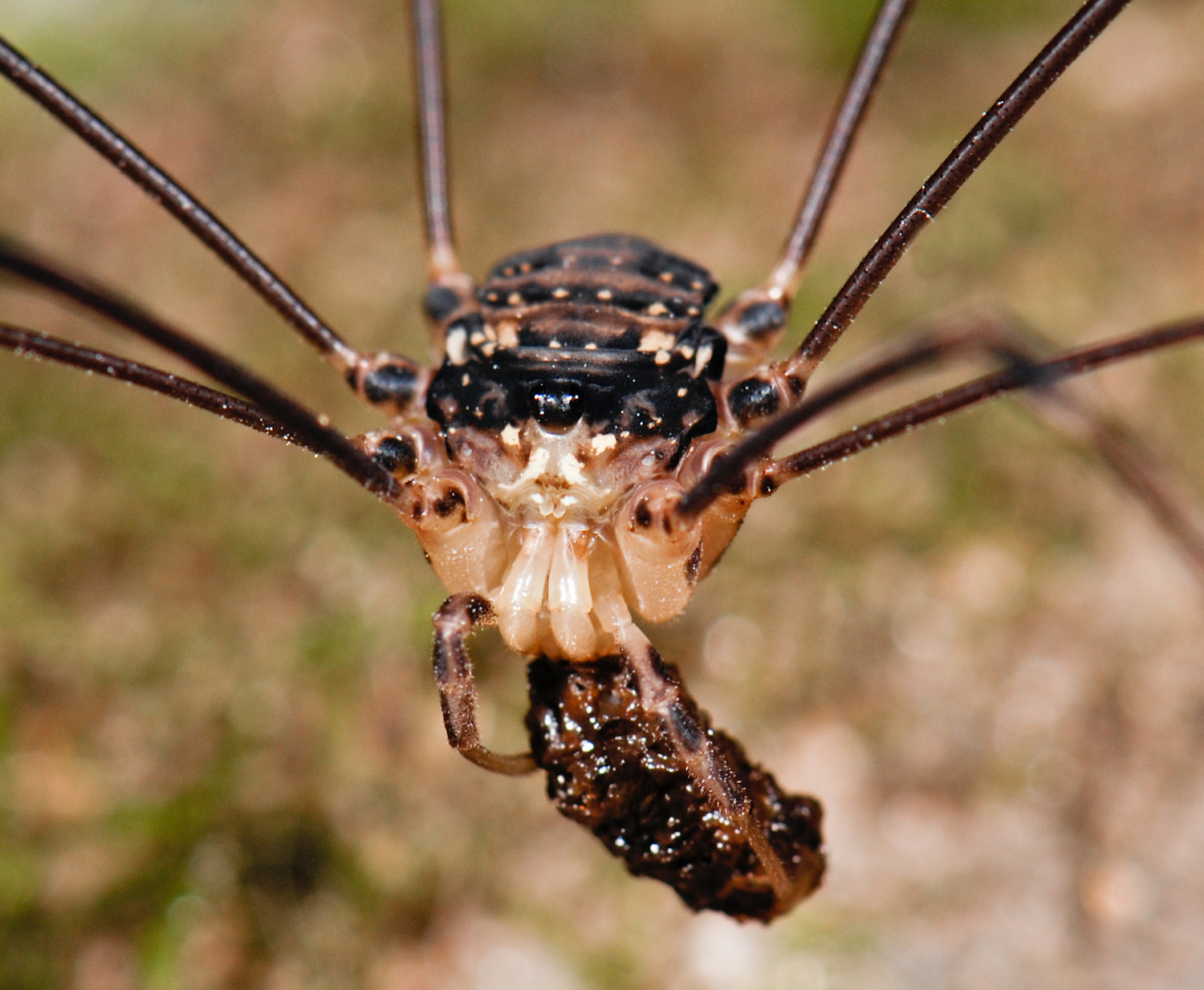

Scientific classification
- Domain: Eukaryota
- Kingdom: Animalia
- Phylum: Arthropoda
- Subphylum: Chelicerata
- Class: Arachnida
- Order: Opiliones
- Family: Sclerosomatidae
- Genus: Nelima
- Species: N. elegans

Binomial name
- Nelima elegans (Weed, 1889)

= Nelima elegans =

Species of harvestman/daddy longlegs

Nelima elegans is a species of harvestman in the family Sclerosomatidae. It is found in North America.
