= Gyas annulatus =

Scientific classification
- Domain: Eukaryota
- Kingdom: Animalia
- Phylum: Arthropoda
- Subphylum: Chelicerata
- Class: Arachnida
- Order: Opiliones
- Family: Sclerosomatidae
- Genus: Gyas
- Species: G. annulatus

Binomial name
- Gyas annulatus (Olivier, 1791)

Synonyms
- Phalangium annulatum Olivier, 1791; Phalangium bicolor Fabricius, 1793

Genus of harvestmen

Gyas annulatus is a species of harvestmen in the family Sclerosomatidae from the Alps.
