= Zaleptus =

Scientific classification
- Domain: Eukaryota
- Kingdom: Animalia
- Phylum: Arthropoda
- Subphylum: Chelicerata
- Class: Arachnida
- Order: Opiliones
- Family: Sclerosomatidae
- Genus: Zaleptus; Thorell, 1876

Genus of harvestmen/daddy longlegs

Zaleptus is a genus of harvestmen in the family Sclerosomatidae from Asia and Australia.

== Species ==
- Zaleptus albimaculatus Roewer, 1955
- Zaleptus albipunctatus Suzuki, 1977
- Zaleptus annulatus (Thorell, 1889)
- Zaleptus annulipes Banks, 1930
- Zaleptus assamensis Roewer, 1955
- Zaleptus ater Suzuki, 1977
- Zaleptus auronitens (Roewer, 1955)
- Zaleptus auropunctatus Roewer, 1955
- Zaleptus aurotransversalis (Roewer, 1955)
- Zaleptus bicornigera (Roewer, 1911)
- Zaleptus bimaculatus (Thorell, 1889)
- Zaleptus biseriatus Roewer, 1910
- Zaleptus caeruleus Roewer, 1910
- Zaleptus cinctus Roewer, 1923
- Zaleptus cochinensis Roewer, 1955
- Zaleptus coronatus (Roewer, 1955)
- Zaleptus crassitarsus Suzuki, 1977
- Zaleptus cupreus (Roewer, 1912)
- Zaleptus cupreus (Roewer, 1912)
- Zaleptus diadematus (Thorell, 1891)
- Zaleptus festivus Thorell, 1889
- Zaleptus fuscus With, 1903
- Zaleptus gravelyi Roewer, 1955
- Zaleptus gravelyi (Roewer, 1912)
- Zaleptus gregoryi Roewer, 1955
- Zaleptus heinrichi (Roewer, 1955)
- Zaleptus heinrichi Roewer, 1955
- Zaleptus hoogstraali Suzuki, 1977
- Zaleptus indicus Roewer, 1929
- Zaleptus jacobsoni Roewer, 1923
- Zaleptus lugubris (Thorell, 1889)
- Zaleptus luteus Roewer, 1931
- Zaleptus lyrifrons Roewer, 1955
- Zaleptus marmoratus Roewer, 1910
- Zaleptus mertensi (Roewer, 1955)
- Zaleptus mjobergi (Banks, 1930)
- Zaleptus niger Roewer, 1955
- Zaleptus occidentalis Roewer, 1955
- Zaleptus ornatus Suzuki, 1977
- Zaleptus perakensis Roewer, 1955
- Zaleptus piceus Roewer, 1911
- Zaleptus popalus (Roewer, 1955)
- Zaleptus pretiosus Roewer, 1955
- Zaleptus pulchellus Banks, 1930
- Zaleptus quadricornis (Thorell, 1891)
- Zaleptus quadrimaculatus Suzuki, 1972
- Zaleptus ramosus Thorell, 1891
- Zaleptus richteri (Roewer, 1955)
- Zaleptus rufipes Roewer, 1955
- Zaleptus scaber (Roewer, 1910)
- Zaleptus scaber Roewer, 1936
- Zaleptus shanicus Roewer, 1955
- Zaleptus siamensis Roewer, 1955
- Zaleptus simplex Thorell, 1891
- Zaleptus spinosus Roewer, 1910
- Zaleptus splendens Roewer, 1911
- Zaleptus subcupreus Thorell, 1889
- Zaleptus sulphureus Thorell, 1889
- Zaleptus sumatranus (Roewer, 1955)
- Zaleptus thorellii With, 1903
- Zaleptus tluteus (Roewer, 1912)
- Zaleptus trichopus Thorell, 1876
- Zaleptus tricolor Roewer, 1955
- Zaleptus unicolor Roewer, 1923
- Zaleptus validus Roewer, 1955
- Zaleptus vanstraeleni Giltay, 1930
- Zaleptus vigilans (With, 1903)
- Zaleptus viridis Roewer, 1929
- Zaleptus werneri Suzuki, 1977
- Zaleptus yodai (Suzuki, 1966)
- Zaleptus yodo Roewer, 1955
- Zaleptus zilchi (Roewer, 1955)
