= Zaleptus festivus =

Scientific classification
- Domain: Eukaryota
- Kingdom: Animalia
- Phylum: Arthropoda
- Subphylum: Chelicerata
- Class: Arachnida
- Order: Opiliones
- Family: Sclerosomatidae
- Genus: Zaleptus
- Species: Z. festivus

Binomial name
- Zaleptus festivus Thorell, 1889

Species of harvestman/daddy longlegs

Zaleptus festivus is a species of harvestmen in the family Sclerosomatidae from Siam.
