= Santa Casa da Misericórdia (disambiguation) =

The Santa Casa da Misericórdia is a charitable organization, founded in 1498. It has numerous local institutions, across Portugal, Brazil, and the rest of the Portuguese-speaking world, including:

- Santa Casa da Misericórdia de Lisboa, Portugal
- Santa Casa da Misericórdia of Braga, Portugal
- Santa Casa da Misericórdia of Valadares, Portugal
- Santa Casa da Misericórdia of Penafiel, Portugal
- Santa Casa da Misericórdia of Macau, China
- Santa Casa da Misericórdia of Salvador, Brazil
- Santa Casa da Misericórdia of São Cristóvão, Brazil
- Santa Casa de Misericórdia of Feira de Santana, Brazil
- Santa Casa de Misericórdia of Santo Amaro, Brazil
