= List of hospitals in Angola =

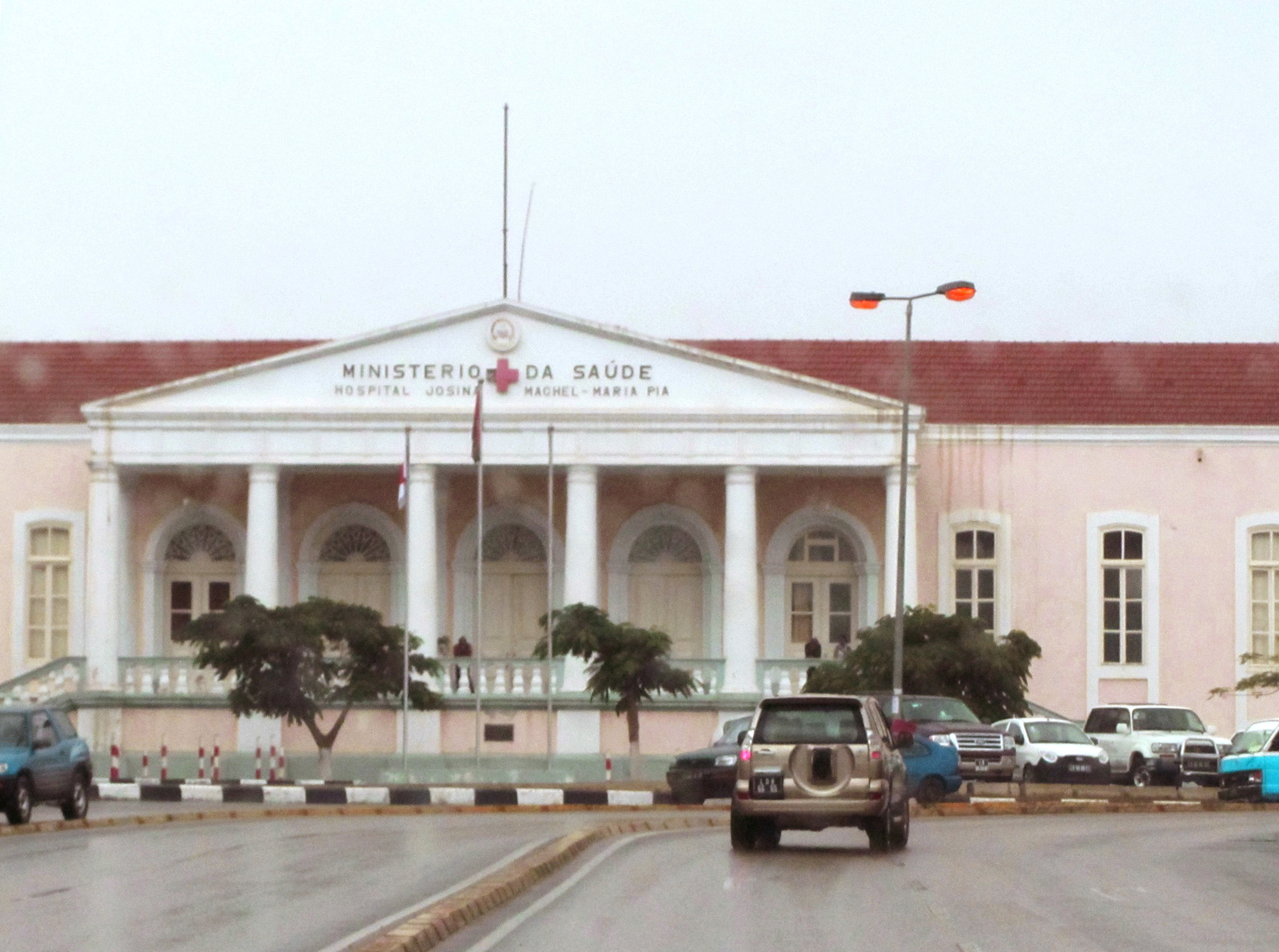
Josina Machel Hospital

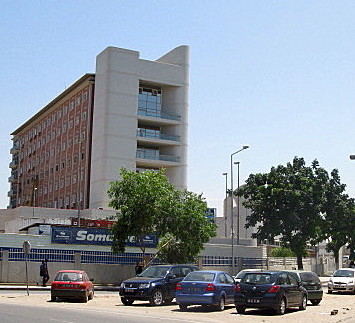
Lucrécia Paím Maternity Hospital

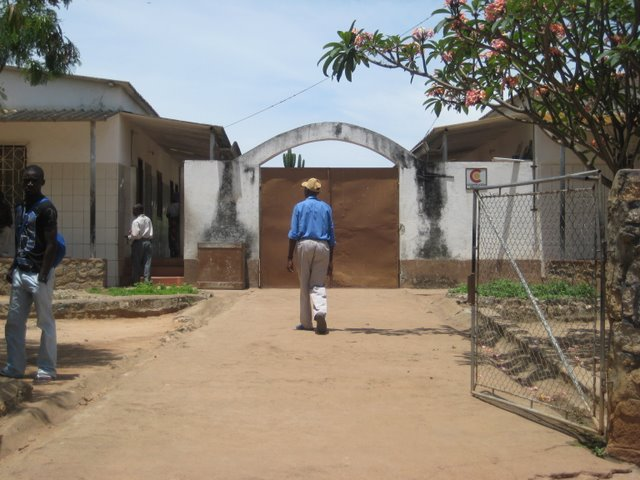
Our Lady of Peace Hospital

This is a list of hospitals in Angola. As of 2019 there are a total of 1,575 medical facilities in Angola.

== Hospitals ==
The hospitals in the table below shows the name, location, affiliation, and number of licensed beds. Only the most notable hospitals in Angola are listed. The best hospitals are located in the country's capital city, Luanda. The largest number of medical facilities in Angola are the health centers that are not listed.

Hospital	Location	Affiliation	Number of licensed beds	Source(s)
Bongo Mission Hospital	Huambo, Huambo Province	Seventh-day Adventist Church Hospital		
Cajueiros General Hospital	Cazenga, Luanda Province	Public		
Clínica Multiperfil	Luanda, Luanda Province	Public		
Hospital Nossa Senhora da Paz	Cubal, Benguela Province	Public	160	
Josina Machel Hospital	Luanda, Luanda Province	Public	534	
Lucrécia Paím Maternity Hospital	Luanda, Luanda Province	Private non-profit		
Hospital Américo Boavida	Luanda, Luanda Province	Public		
Hospital Do Prenda	Luanda, Luanda Province	Public		
Hospital Geral Camama	Luanda, Luanda Province	Public		
Hospital Geral Kilamba Kiaxi	Luanda, Luanda Province	Public		
Hospital Municipal de Luanda	Luanda, Luanda Province	Public		
Hospital Neves Bendinha	Luanda, Luanda Province	Public		
Hospital Sanatório	Luanda, Luanda Province	Public		
Consol Provincial de Kuango Kubango	Kubango	Provincial		
Hospital Municipal do Kuvango Municipal	Kubango	Municipal		
Hospital Municipal de Cafunfo	Lunda Norte Province	Municipal		
Hospital Municipal de Lucapa	Lunda Norte Province	Municipal		
Hospital Municipal de Nzagi Cambulo	Lunda Norte Province	Municipal		
Hospital Provincial da Luanda Norte	Lunda Norte Province	Municipal		
Consol Provincial de Luanda Sul	Lunda Sul Province	Provincial		
Hospital Barra Do Dande	Bengo Province	Public		
Hospital Dos Dembos	Bengo Province	Public		
Benguela 70 Hospital	Benguela	Public		
Caham Hospital	Cunene Province	Public		
Chiulo Hospital	Cunene	Public		
Curoca Hospital	Cunene	Public		
Cuvelai Hospital	Cunene	Public		
Namacunde Hospital	Cunene	Public		
Oncocua Hospital	Cunene	Public		
Bailundo Hospital	Huambo	Public		
Caminho de Ferro de Benguela Hospital	Huambo	Public		
Huambo Sanitorio Hospital	Huambo	Public		
Agostino Neto Hospital	Huila Province	Public		
Capelongo Hospital	Huila	Public		
Igreja Evangelica Sinodal de Angola Hospital	Huila	Public		
Kapelongo Hospital	Huila	Public		
Missão Católica-Madre Isabel Hospital	Huila	Public		
Mitcha Hospital	Huila	Public		
P. Zeca Hospital	Huila	Public		
Pioneiro Zeca Hospital	Huila	Public		
Sanatório Hospital Lubango	Huila	Public		
Camucuio Hospital	Namibe	Public		
Saco Mar Hospital	Namibe	Public		
Sanatório Hospital Moçamedes	Namibe	Public		
Uige Sanitorio Hospital	Uige	Public		

== See also ==
- Healthcare in Angola
