= Burning of slavery records in Brazil =

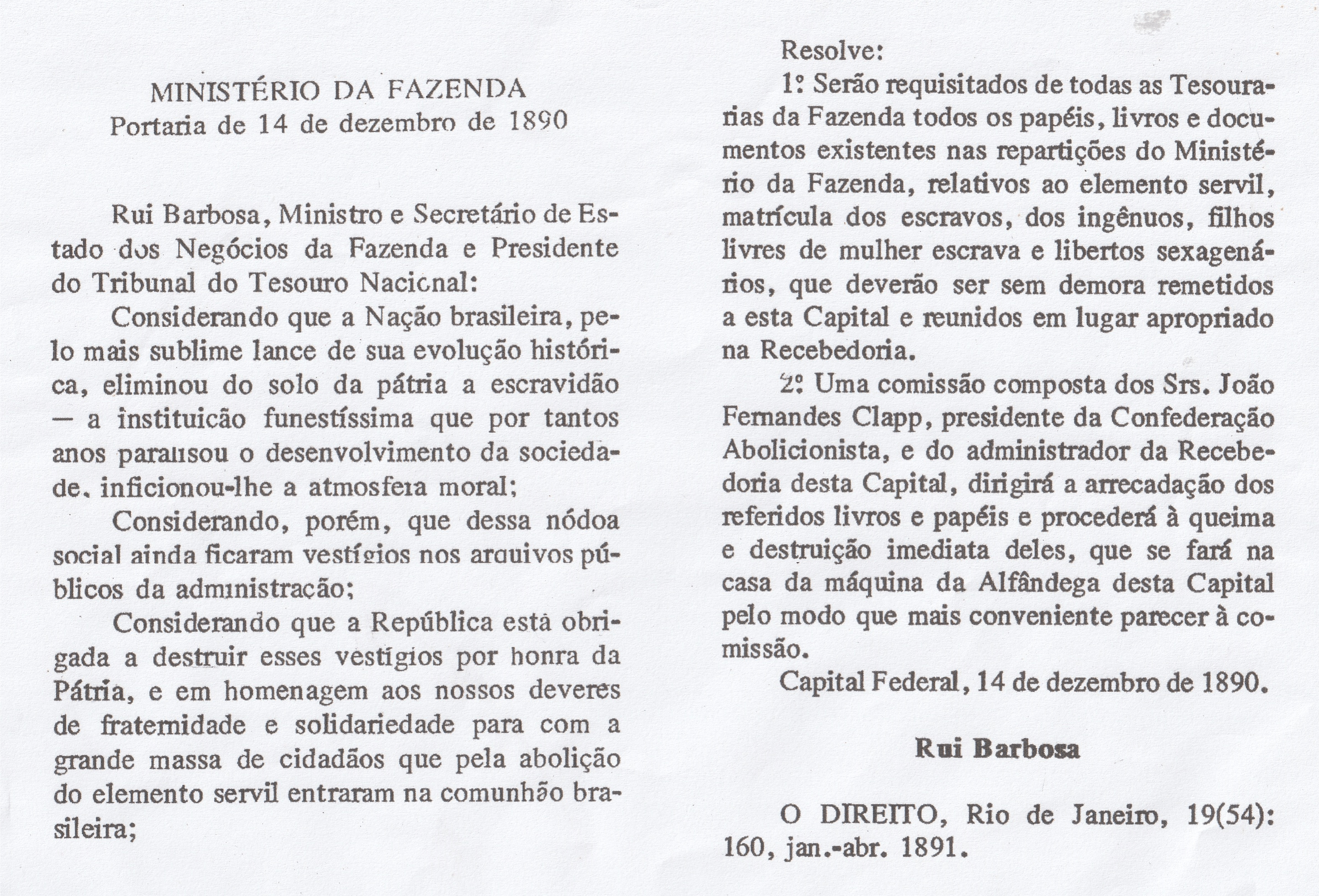
Ruy Barbosa's ministerial dispatch that ordered, under the civil registry law at the time, the burning of slavery records in Brazil on 14 December 1890

On 14 December 1890, a document signed by Ruy Barbosa, then serving as Minister of Finance of the newly proclaimed First Brazilian Republic, ordered the burning of all records on the purchase and sale of slaves in Brazil, including registration books, customs duties and tax records. The document determined that the records be sent to Rio de Janeiro, then the country's capital, where they would be burned. The burning of the records took place on 13 May 1891, the second anniversary of the abolition of slavery in the country.

== Background ==
It is believed that Barbosa issued the document with the intention that former slave owners would not be able to seek compensation after the abolition of slavery by the Golden Law on 13 May 1888. On the other hand, it is also believed that the burning of records prevented former slaves from having access to the dates of their purchases, which, in theory, could be used to demand compensation for having been illegally enslaved, since the slave trade to Brazil had been prohibited by law since 7 November 1831. Such possibility of seeking compensation from former slave owners was due to the fact that the 1831 law that abolished the slave trade was largely ignored. It is estimated that after 1831 around 300,000 enslaved Africans entered Brazil through illegal trafficking. The burning of the records would also have made the resumption by the new republican regime of princess Isabel's plans to compensate former slaves with land and tools to work unfeasible.

"The National Congress congratulates the Provisional Government for ordering the elimination of traces of slavery in Brazil from the national archives."
Motion of support from the National Congress to Ruy Barbosa's order

After the abolition of slavery in Brazil, a process of oblivion of the country's slave past began. Because of this, it is argued that the burning of the records relating to slavery in the country was linked to the search for the erasure of a "shameful past" and the reconstruction of history through the "ideals of progress", thus incorporating Brazilian slaves into a capitalist modernization project. According to historian Lilia Schwarcz, even though it was unsuccessful in its attempts to eliminate all slavery records, the incident takes on the meaning of an attempt to erase the slavery past and an attempt to restart Brazilian history from the present, in which Brazil found itself shortly after the proclamation of the republic.

At the time, the newspaper O Estado de São Paulo reported, in different editions, on the topic:

"O Estado de S.Paulo - 23/12/1890 - Opposition to the destruction. On 20 December 1890, a motion in support of Ruy Barbosa's order was voted and approved in the National Congress. But, not without opposition. Representatives of São Paulo, Minas Gerais and Rio Grande do Sul were against the order. The 23 December edition of O Estado de S.Paulo brought more details about the session.

The note said that deputy Francisco Coelho Duarte Badaró (MG) registered his protest against the burning of all slavery records in Brazil. After making the reservation that he was not speaking out against the "meritorious work of abolition" but rather against the destruction of documents, he said: "we must not play the role of iconoclasts, we must have an archive".

"Ours is a new life, but we need to have our history written with true evidence. By having a large number of documents burned on the history of Brazil, the shame will never disappear, the traces of slavery will never be erased from our history", the deputy continued.

In the edition of 21 December 1890, O Estado de S.Paulo published on its cover a criticism of Ruy Barbosa's order. It questioned a minister's right to the fate of documents that "belong to history rather than the archives of the offices".

== Legal basis ==
The document signed by Ruy Barbosa had a legal basis authorized by Article 11 of decree No. 370 of 2 May 1890, which was the Civil Registry Law created in the provisional government of president Deodoro da Fonseca. The article has the following original wording: "The registration books under No. 6, in which the pledge of slaves was recorded, will be incinerated, and if they contain other records, these will be transported with the same order number to the new books of No. 2, 4 or 5" (Decree No. 370 of 2 May 1890, Article 11).

== Survival of some documents ==
Yale historian Stuart B. Schwartz wrote that

Historians of Brazil have so often repeated the myth that the documents on slavery were destroyed in the fervor of abolition that they have sometimes led themselves to believe it. While it is true that much documentation is now lost, there remain a wide variety of sources that simply have not been adequately exploited.

For example, when a living owner set a slave at liberty, it was done by a letter of manumission. "Libertos (manumitted slaves) would normally keep the original letter in their possession, since the illegal enslavement of people of color was always a danger, but in order to protect themselves and to fully legalize the transition of status, the document was then taken to the nearest notary and transcribed in his register as well". Notarised copies survive in the public archives and are a valuable source for scholars. It is not clear how these documents escaped burning.

== See also ==
- Abolitionism in Brazil
- Coleção de Livros do Banguê
- Afro-Brazilian history
- Post-abolition in Brazil
