= HIV/AIDS in Angola =

Angola has a large HIV/AIDS infected population, however, it has one of the lowest prevalence rates in the Southern Africa zone. The status of the HIV/AIDS epidemic in Angola is expected to change within the near future due to several forms of behavioral, cultural, and economic characteristics within the country such as lack of knowledge and education, low levels of condom use, the frequency of sex and number of sex partners, economic disparities and migration. There is a significant amount of work being done in Angola to combat the epidemic, but most aid is coming from outside of the country.

== Prevalence ==
In 2003, the Joint United Nations Programme on HIV/AIDS (UNAIDS) estimated the adult HIV prevalence HIV at 3.9%. In 2004, statistics from the Angolan Ministry of Health and the National AIDS Control Program found a prevalence of 2.8% among pregnant women who were seeking prenatal care. While the low rate seems to be a good thing, the prevalence could soon mimic the rapid upward trajectory experienced in other African countries.

Since 2003, Angola has made progress towards reducing the prevalence of HIV/AIDS in its population. At the end of 2016, it was estimated that 280,000 people were living with HIV/AIDS in Angola, which corresponds to a prevalence percentage of approximately 2.2% among adults aged 15–49 years old. New infections among people of all ages as of 2016 has shown a decrease from previous years, landing at an approximation of 25,000 cases. However, AIDS related deaths in Angola reached an all-time high in 2016, peaking at approximately 11,000 by the end of the year.

=== By gender ===
HIV/AIDS is more prevalent amongst women. In 2017, there were an estimated 160,000 women 15 years and older living with HIV—a prevalence of 2.2% of the female population. In 2017, 110,000 men had HIV—a prevalence of 1.5% among the male population. This prevalence can be partially attributed to the lack of focus on women's education. Angola only has six years of compulsory education from age 6 to age 11.

After those six years, many women are expected to stay at home and assist their families in supporting the household—more so than males are expected to due to gender bias. This causes many of these women to miss out on some of the health education which takes place between the ages of 9–16 in the Angolan educational system. In addition, there is a trend in which Angolan men marry much younger women, which leaves these women at a greater risk for being with a man who has HIV/AIDs, as the men that they marry are often more sexually experienced. The average age of women who get married in Angola is 18.5 years old. The average age for men is 23.5 years old.

== HIV testing and treatment ==
While prevalence of HIV/AIDS is low in Angola compared to surrounding countries, the diagnosis and treatment of the disease is a top health priority. In 2016, approximately 40% of people living with HIV/AIDS know their status. Of the people who know their status, approximately 62,000 people are on Antiretroviral Therapy (ART), which is 22% of the total population of people living with HIV/AIDS in the country.

45,000 of all individuals on ART have suppressed viral load, which is a significant percentage of the population on ART, but only represents 16% of people living with HIV/AIDS in Angola. One of the international problems that arises after individuals are placed on ART is the ability for them to stay on the treatment regimen. This is seen in Angola as well, as only 39% of all individuals placed on ART are known to have been still taking it 12 months after beginning treatment.

== History ==
The 27-year civil war in Angola, lasting from 1975 until 2002, kept the spread of HIV to a minimum due to large parts of the country being inaccessible to people infected with the virus. During the civil war, individuals from neighboring countries such as Zambia, Botswana, and Zimbabwe (all countries with high prevalence rates of HIV) were also not allowed to come into the country, which played a significant role in controlling the spread of HIV. However, since the end of the war, transportation routes between countries and within the country ave reopened and communication between neighboring countries and Angola has reopened, thus providing a greater potential for the spread of HIV/AIDS.

In Angola, about 70% of the population is under the age of 24 years old. In 2003, a knowledge, attitudes, and practices (KAP) survey was conducted among people aged 14 to 24 years old. This survey revealed that approximately 43% of young people surveyed were having sex by the age of 15. This prevalence of sex at such early ages in Angola makes it one of the highest rates in the world. On top of the high rates of sex at early ages, there is a considerable lack of access to condoms, lack of access to adequate health care, a high incidence of sexually transmitted infections, and high rates of commercial sex work in Angola. These are some of the largest barriers to overcome when dealing with HIV prevention in Angola and are all conditions that leave the country ripe for a spike in HIV.

HIV in Angola is transmitted primarily through heterosexual sex with multiple partners, with a male-to-female ratio of 0.8:1, indicating that women are more likely to be infected than men. However, HIV prevalence rates among men who have sex with men are higher than the national average. Contaminated needles, medical devices, and blood transfusions are the second largest spreader of HIV/AIDS, although more specific research in this area is needed.

== National response ==
HIV is not the only problem that Angola is facing, as the country is also dealing with extreme economic, social, and political problems. Approximately 68% of the population lives in poverty, and 26% of those living in poverty are living in extreme poverty. Despite these previously mentioned issues that Angola is facing, the Angolan government has made significant efforts to work within the country as well as with international donors and foundations to combat the HIV/AIDS epidemic. All of these efforts have been put in place to work towards delivering HIV/AIDS prevention methods to the public.

The national AIDS Control Program [Programa Nacional de Luta contra o Sida (PNLS)] was established within the Ministry of Health in 1987. This program was put in place to serve as a way to fight against the HIV/AIDS epidemic as a nation. Most of the financing of this program has come from external donations to helping the country.

The National AIDS Commission was established in 2002 to work towards a better high-level governmental attention to the HIV/AIDS epidemic. The developmental strategy resulting from the creation of this commission called for a special attention to a plethora of vulnerable populations within Angola: sex workers, truck drivers, mine workers, military personnel, youth, street children, pregnant women, dislocated people, refugees and resettled populations, prisoners, injecting drug users, blood transfusion recipients, traditional healers, traditional birth attendants, health workers, and children living with or affected by HIV/AIDS.

In June 2004, the Angolan National Assembly passed a comprehensive HIV/AIDS law with the purpose of "protecting and promoting full health through the adoption of measures needed to prevent, control, treat and investigate HIV/AIDS". The law was put into place in efforts to protect the rights of the individuals living in Angola who are living with HIV/AIDS. Protections resulting from this law include the right to employment, free public health care, and confidentiality within the country's health care system.

Angola has developed national guidelines for providing integrated care to people living with HIV/AIDS. However, the mechanisms for distributing antiretroviral drugs need to be implemented outside of Luanda, a problem that is seen throughout several nations in Africa and around the world dealing with this epidemic.

Thus far, the low HIV prevalence in Angola has not had a severe impact on Angola's economic productivity; however, if the spread of HIV continues, it is likely that the epidemic will be particularly devastating to the agricultural, transportation, mining, and education sectors. The fear of HIV/AIDS in Angola is prevalent in all aspects of life, often leading to stigmas surrounding those with HIV/AIDS as well.

== International response and help efforts ==
Similar to many other African countries, much of the help to combat HIV infection and progression to AIDS has come from without the country's own confines.

The United States began giving help to Angola in 2001 with the AIDSMark program established under the U.S. Agency for International Development (USAID) which was meant to reduce HIV transmission as well as transmission of other sexually transmitted infections and diseases. The program sought to do this primarily through promoting condom use in some of the highly vulnerable populations described above. Since its start, the program also adopted other prevention methods such as counseling, condom distribution, social networking, and prevention of mother to child transmission. This program was put into place to support all 18 provinces in Angola.

Another way in which the United States helps to support Angola in its fight against HIV/AIDS is through the President's Emergency Plan for AIDS Relief (PEPFAR). Working in conjunction with officials in Angola, PEPFAR provides assistance to maximize the coverage and impact of the national HIV/AIDS response in high risk areas of Angola. PEPFAR also works with the Angolan government to secure investments to make sure that HIV/AIDS prevention is instituted in the necessary social and health service systems within the country. In 2016, PEPFAR helped save the lives of over 20,000 people by providing access to ART and screened over 75,000 for HIV through various testing methods.

== Stigma ==
Due to the large amounts of fear surrounding the HIV/AIDS epidemic in Angola, many individuals who are living with HIV/AIDS are stigmatized greatly by the public. A result from a poll asking if individuals would buy food from someone they knew was HIV positive showed that 51% of people surveyed would not buy the food from that person. Legal efforts made by the government have helped with discrimination against those who are living with HIV/AIDS, but it has not put an end to the issue, a common theme seen across the world. Also, in response to the stigma surrounding this epidemic in the country, many advocacy and awareness campaigns for HIV/AIDS have been started in Angola to help combat the long lasting stigma surrounding this disease.

== See also ==
- Health in Angola
- Maternal health in Angola
- Demographics of Angola
- LGBT rights in Angola
