= Maternal health in Angola =

Maternal health in Angola is a very complicated issue. In the Sub-Saharan region of Africa where Angola is located, poor maternal health has been an ongoing problem contributing to the decreased level of health in the population in the early 21st century.

According to the World Health Organization (WHO), maternal health refers to the health of women during pregnancy, childbirth, and the postpartum period. Maternal health is an important factor in determining the status of health in all countries as the health of newborns, which depends on the health of the mother, has an effect on the developmental stages of each individual. In Angola, maternal health is affected by many different factors, including the country's history, economic state, and overall prevalence of infectious diseases.

The WHO lists the leading causes of maternal death as severe bleeding, infections, high blood pressure during pregnancy, obstructed labor, and unsafe abortions. These causes compose approximately 75 percent of all maternal mortalities worldwide, with the vast majority occurring in developing countries. The other remaining factors that contribute to maternal death include malaria, anemia, and HIV/AIDS during pregnancy. The WHO also states that the reasons why so many women die during childbirth are usually poverty, long distance to care, lack of information, inadequate service, and cultural practices. All of these causes of maternal death, and the corresponding reasons, are very familiar among women in Angola.

== Introduction ==
Angola represents a country with one of the highest maternal death rates in the world. Statistics vary, but the estimated maternal mortality ratio (MMR) toward the end of the Civil War was between 1,281–1,500 maternal deaths to 100,000 live births. This estimate was taken during the late 1990s and, again, in 2002 by UNICEF and represents the MMR situation in the country at the end of the War. In 2008, the estimate decreased to around 610 deaths per 100,000 live births. In comparison, Sweden is estimated to have an MMR of 5 deaths to 100,000 live births.

According to the United States Agency for International Development (USAID), the MMR of the country appears to be decreasing since the end of the Civil War in 2002. However, it is still one of the highest in the world. On average, women give birth 7.2 times. The infant mortality ratio is 154 deaths per 1,000 live births. The mortality rate of children under 5 years of age is 254 per 1,000 live births. These figures represent improvement since the end of the War, although they still are very high and show the need for improvement in maternal health.

Despite the improvements that have been made, the Human Development Index for 2011 shows a poor level of maternal health in Angola. A high level of adolescent fertility and low use of contraceptives for women of all ages was reported. This is observed by the high total fertility rate. These factors contribute to an elevated risk of health problems during pregnancy and childbirth.

== Factors contributing to maternal health ==
Economist Amartya Sen gave an important definition of human health. Sen stated, "Health is among the most important conditions in human life." Health is crucial in the growth of an economy, academic achievements, mental development, opportunities for employment and earning an income, as well as security and well-being. Maternal health is considerably more important because it is directly related to the health of an unborn child. The health conditions of a pregnant woman affect her child throughout the child's life. Sen explains that an individual's capabilities to live a fulfilled life are dependent on their mental and physical capabilities. These capabilities are greatly influenced by maternal factors.

In any given country, the health of the people is affected by many different factors. Health factors can be as simple as daily life activities, as well as national and cultural customs. Specifically, maternal health, according to Dr. Jacobsen, is closely related to social economic class, education, economics, topography, and infectious diseases. The health risks and factors that women in Angola face are unique to the country, as well as reflect the issues of the region of Sub-Saharan Africa. The health of a population is greatly influenced by what takes place in women before, during, and after pregnancy. Diseases, political conflict, cultural beliefs, health systems and practices all contribute to the health of a population by influencing maternal health.

=== Infrastructure ===
Many human capabilities have been listed by a number of economists. These capabilities try to outline the important factors needed by individuals in order to live full and enriched lives. The writer and feminist economist, Martha Nussbaum, created a list of essential capabilities that individuals need in order to be productive and content. One of the human capacities listed by Nussbaum is bodily health. Achieving bodily health in Angola is difficult for many reasons, but, especially, for the women who are in their child-bearing years.

Martha Nussbaum and other feminist economists have tried to show in an academic environment how important gender equality is in order to establish and improve economies and health care on every level of society. In the case of Angolan women, the level of gender inequality involving health care service is unclear. The main issue facing women in Angola is not related to cultural inequality, but the fact that the health care system, infrastructure, and economy were devastated during the Angolan Civil War and have been slow to rebuild. The government has tried since 2002 to provide more basic services to the citizens, but progress is slow. Shantha Bloemen, a writer for the United Nations Children's Fund (UNICEF), reported that progress to meet the necessary requirements that ensure an enriched life is improving slowly because the country's infrastructure and medical personnel are not yet sufficient to meet the needs of the population.

=== HIV/AIDS ===
Eileen Stillwaggon, an economist at Gettysburg College, has written extensively on HIV/AIDS and the problems associated with the disease throughout Sub-Saharan Africa and Angola. The AIDS epidemic in the area has caused generations of people to die and has been spreading throughout the region since the 1980s. Stillwaggon addresses a number of risk factors that increase the risk of HIV/AIDS in individuals, as well as populations. She specifically addressed women and girls in Africa as falling victim to the increased risk of the HIV/AIDS infection due to both biological and social risk factors.

HIV/AIDS is a problem throughout the country. It has decreased the population's health and increased the risks associated with pregnancy. However, HIV/AIDS has affected maternal health in Angola less severely than in other Sub-Saharan African countries. The Civil War affected the prevalence of HIV/AIDS paradoxically in the country. The War caused large-scale internal migration to take place across Angola. Individuals and families moved in order to avoid conflict. Citizens also left the country as refugees. Migrating people have a higher risk of contracting communicable diseases, including HIV. Throughout the 1970s, 1980s, and early 1990s, AIDS swept across many countries in the region. The Civil War in Angola created an environment of political instability and violence. The War decreased the number of foreign people entering the country and was responsible for a smaller initial population infection rate during the first years of the AIDS epidemic in Sub-Saharan Africa. This is evident by CIA country reports stating that the HIV/AIDS rate in Angola in 2008 sat at only 2 percent, compared favorably to neighboring Zambia, which has an HIV/AIDS rate of 13 percent.

=== Angolan Civil War ===
Of all the factors that negatively affect maternal health in Angola, the Angolan Civil War may have been the most severe. According to USAID, during the War as many as 1 million people were killed, 4.5 million people became internally displaced, and 450,000 fled the country as refugees.

The consequences of the War have been devastating throughout the country and had a particularly negative effect on women seeking prenatal care. In a study done to assess the health care-seeking behavior of Angolan women, it was made clear by Karne Pettersson that the War damaged the country's health infrastructure. Records in war-torn areas were not kept during episodes of violence, and many were lost due to the War. Vital records, including death and birth certificates, were not kept current, and access to reliable health care was limited for citizens. For this reason, data from this time period regarding maternal health is difficult to find. This harsh reality during the War was partially responsible for a cultural shift.

Pettersson goes on to explain that the war has affected the attitudes of women in Angola regarding health care and child birth. Understandably, the War has made women more cautious and distrustful of government programs, including health care programs. The War has caused behavioral changes in women seeking health care. It is common for women today to not seek medical attention when in childbirth but to give birth to their children at home.

=== Unsafe abortion ===
Unsafe abortions are one of the leading causes of maternal death in the developing world. In many African countries, abortions are considered taboo. Women who get abortions often are associated with negative stereotypes due to cultural beliefs. Many of these cultural issues force women to seek abortions in unsafe ways. According to the Women's international Network News, these "back-alley" abortions are the cause of thousands of deaths every year.

More political attention has been given to the issue of abortions in Angola due to the unsafe procedures and the health effects on young women. Justice Minister Guilhermina Prata recently presented legislation with the intent to help decrease the number of illegal abortions done in Angola. In the region of Sub-Sahara Africa, the majority, if not all, of illegal abortions are unsafe. It is believed that 40 percent of women who have an illegal abortion die due to complications of the surgery. Information on unsafe abortions in Angola is difficult to obtain. However, due to the nature of the health care system and the prevalence of unofficial fees, the number of illegal abortions is potentially much higher than is reported. The debate regarding unsafe abortions in Angola is not new and is highly affected by the cultural and religious atmosphere in the country.

=== Cultural aspects of maternal health ===
Maternal health in Angola is greatly influenced by culture. However, the culture in Angola is a culmination of a society that has faced decades of war, urbanization, political uncertainty, and a number of other issues that have caused poor health.

According to Pettersson, on the individual level, women named the following four factors that highly influenced their decisions regarding child birth and prenatal care: 1) the individual's perception of the quality of care, 2) the process of labor, 3) the significance of informal fees, and 4) the woman's perception of being empowered to make her own decisions regarding childbirth.

Perceptions of the quality of care vary greatly across the country. For many women, care at a formal facility is so bad that they prefer to stay at home and have a home delivery. The process of labor is affected by strong traditions. Great influence is given by grandparents with more traditional methods who normally suggest home births. However, due to more access to technology and the mixing of women in larger cities, a shift is taking place moving toward more advanced means of childbirth in formal hospitals.

Despite this shift of thinking from traditional to more modern ways of child birth, other factors, such as high informal fees and an individual woman's perception of being "courageous", seem to bar women from seeking care in health facilities. Many women still view childbirth as an opportunity to show the physical strength that they have.

=== Poverty ===
One of the major problems with maternal health in Angola is the existence of widespread poverty throughout the country. The poverty in the country is a result of the long period of violence. The infrastructure was so badly damaged during the War that electricity is not reliable or accessible to many areas, especially areas of dense poverty. Poverty is associated with an elevated risk of all kinds of health problems, especially with maternal health.

USAID reported in 2010, in Angola, 68 percent of the population lives below the poverty line, living on only $1.70 per day. Of these, 28 percent live in extreme poverty, living on only $0.70 per day. Poverty discourages women from seeking healthcare during childbirth. It is common for women to give birth at home for free instead of going to the hospital and being forced to pay “hidden" fees or ad hoc fees in order to receive care. This causes complications in childbirth. If a woman waits too long to seek care and experiences a complication during delivery, emergency attention is not given, and the woman, child, or both, face a higher risk of death.

In Angola, ad hoc demands at clinics are commonplace. Kyllike Christensson, co-author of "Ad Hoc Demands," found while studying the social aspects of child birth behavior that it is not uncommon for patients to arrive at a hospital or a clinic in need of care and be forced to wait until payment is made. In many cases, women chose to have their children at home instead of go to a hospital. This reality, along with the negative level of confidence many women have of the clinicians, results in higher numbers of MMR and IMR.

== Policies to improve maternal health ==
Christensson explained that many international programs to improve maternal health are currently being developed and implemented in Angola. The government has implemented programs that train midwife providers in order to increase the number of births attended to by a credentialed clinician. UNICEF has reported that the government is also investing money into education and health care. The money that is generated due to the large oil reserves in the country is being used to improve maternal and child health across the country. Free clinics are available to pregnant women and women with small children.

Along with government programs in Angola, many different non-governmental organizations are becoming involved with health care and maternal health. The Christian Children Fund Angola began a program in the country shortly after the end of the Civil War. The program addressed malnourished children and specifically provided emergency obstetric care. Programs like these vary in size and their ability to adequately reach large populations. However, they continue to be important in increasing maternal health throughout the country.

== See also ==
- Health in Angola
- HIV/AIDS in Angola
