= Santa Casa da Misericórdia of Salvador =

Former church and hospital in Bahia, Brazil

Church and Santa Casa da Misericórdia
- Igreja e Santa Casa de Misericórdia
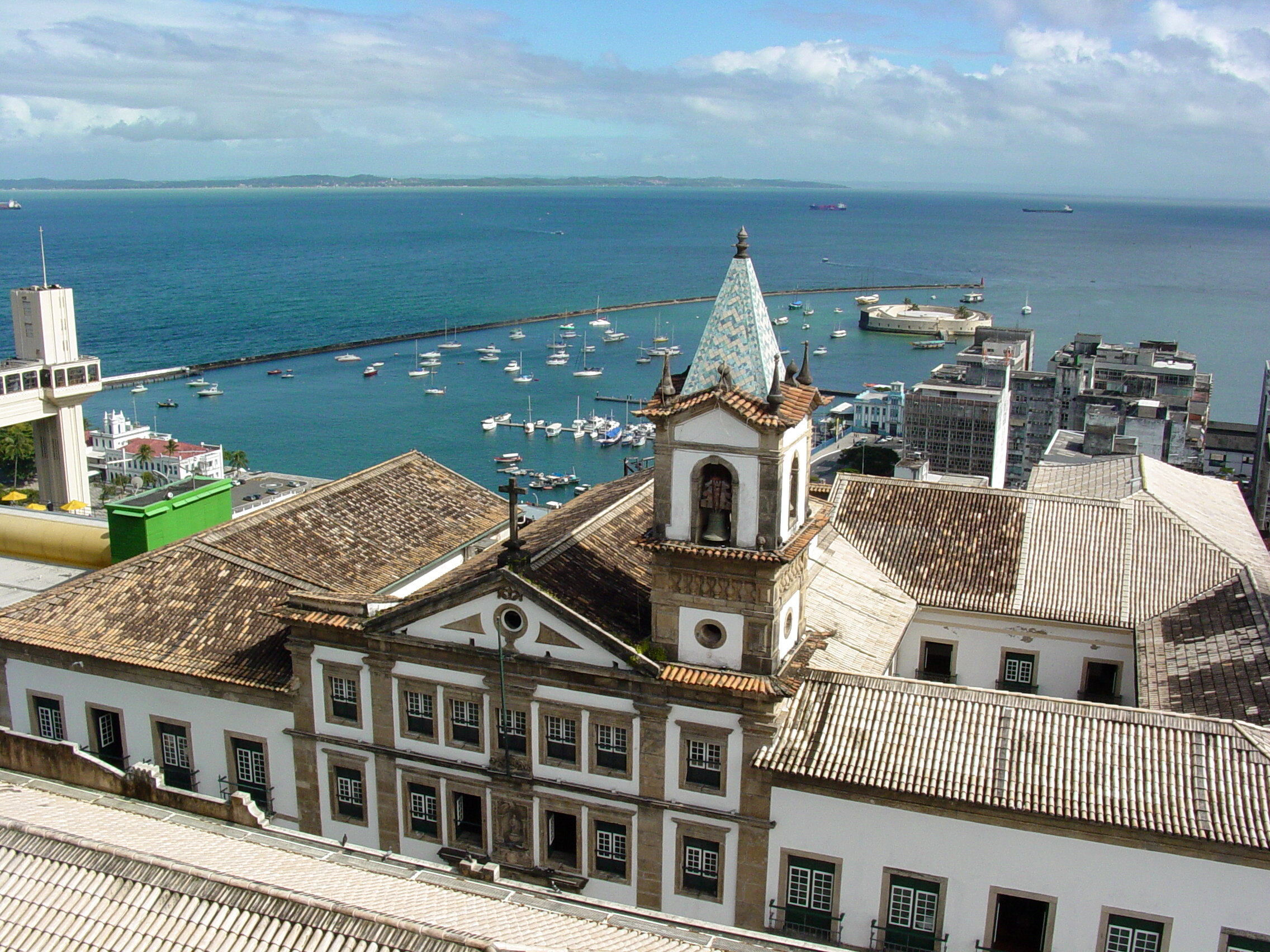
- Church and Santa Casa da Misericórdia, Salvador, Bahia

- Location of the Church and Santa Casa da Misericórdia

Religion
- Affiliation: Catholic
- Rite: Roman

Location
- Municipality: Salvador
- State: Bahia
- Country: Brazil
- Interactive map of Church and Santa Casa da Misericórdia
- Coordinates: 12.973773°S 38.511996°W

Architecture
- Style: Baroque
- Established: 1549
- Direction of façade: East

National Historic Heritage of Brazil
- Designated: 1938
- Reference no.: 80

Misericórdia Museum
- Museu da Misericórdia
- Established: 2006
- Website: museudamisericordia.org.br

The Church and Santa Casa da Misericórdia (Portuguese: Igreja e Santa Casa de Misericórdia) is a former church and hospital in Salvador, Bahia, Brazil. It was established as a branch of the Santa Casa da Misericórdia in 1549; a hospital, Hospital da Caridade (English: Charity Hospital), functioned from the 17th century. The Santa Casa additionally held a monopoly on burials in colonial Bahia. It was additionally funded by its brotherhood, the Brotherhood of Santa Casa. The Santa Casa of Bahia accepted the donation of a slave-holding plantation, the Fazenda Saubara in present-day Saubara, in 1652. The former hospital and chapel now functions as a museum, the Misericórdia Museum (Portuguese: Museu da Misericórdia). The Santa Casa, apart from the museum, now owns and operates the Santa Izabel Hospital, the Santa Casa Medical Faculty, the Jorge Calmon Memory Center, Campo Santo Cemetery, an events space, and numerous historic buildings in Salvador.

== Location ==
The Church and Santa Casa da Misericórdia is located in the Historic Center of Salvador. Its monumental portals and baroque façade face a narrow street that runs through the historic center. The rear of the Santa Casa opens to views of the Bay of All Saints. The building was adjacent to the Old Cathedral of Salvador to the north; the demolition of the old cathedral in 1933 disfigured the north façade of the Santa Casa. The old cathedral was replaced by a public square, the Praça da Sé, and the Santa Casa now faces the Archbishop's Palace of Salvador.

== Misericórdia Museum ==
The Misericórdia Museum was established in 2006. It has a collection of 3,874 pieces of furniture, art, sacred imagery, and relics of the Hospital da Caridade itself. The museum additionally maintains the chapel of Santa Casa, much in its original form. The extensive archival records and library of the Santa Casa are housed separately at the Jorge Calmon Memory Center.

== Protected status ==
The Church and Santa Casa da Misericórdia was listed as a historic structure by the National Institute of Historic and Artistic Heritage in 1938.

== See also ==
- The Chapel of Senhor Bom Jesus dos Pobres (Portuguese: Capela Senhor Bom Jesus dos Pobres), once part of the Fazenda Saubara in present-day Saubara
- The Cemetery of Campo Santo, inaugurated in 1840, and still operated by the Santa Casa
- The Santa Izabel Hospital, inaugurated in 1893, which replaced the Hospital da Caridade
- The Coleção de Livros do Banguê (English: Banguê Book Collection), an 11-volume set of records of the burial expenses of enslaved people in colonial Bahia, now held at the Jorge Calmon Memory Center
