= Coleção de Livros do Banguê =

Brazilian collection of slave burials

- Author: Santa Casa da Misericórdia da Bahia
- Language: Portuguese
- Published: 1742–1853
- Publication place: Brazil
- Media type: manuscript

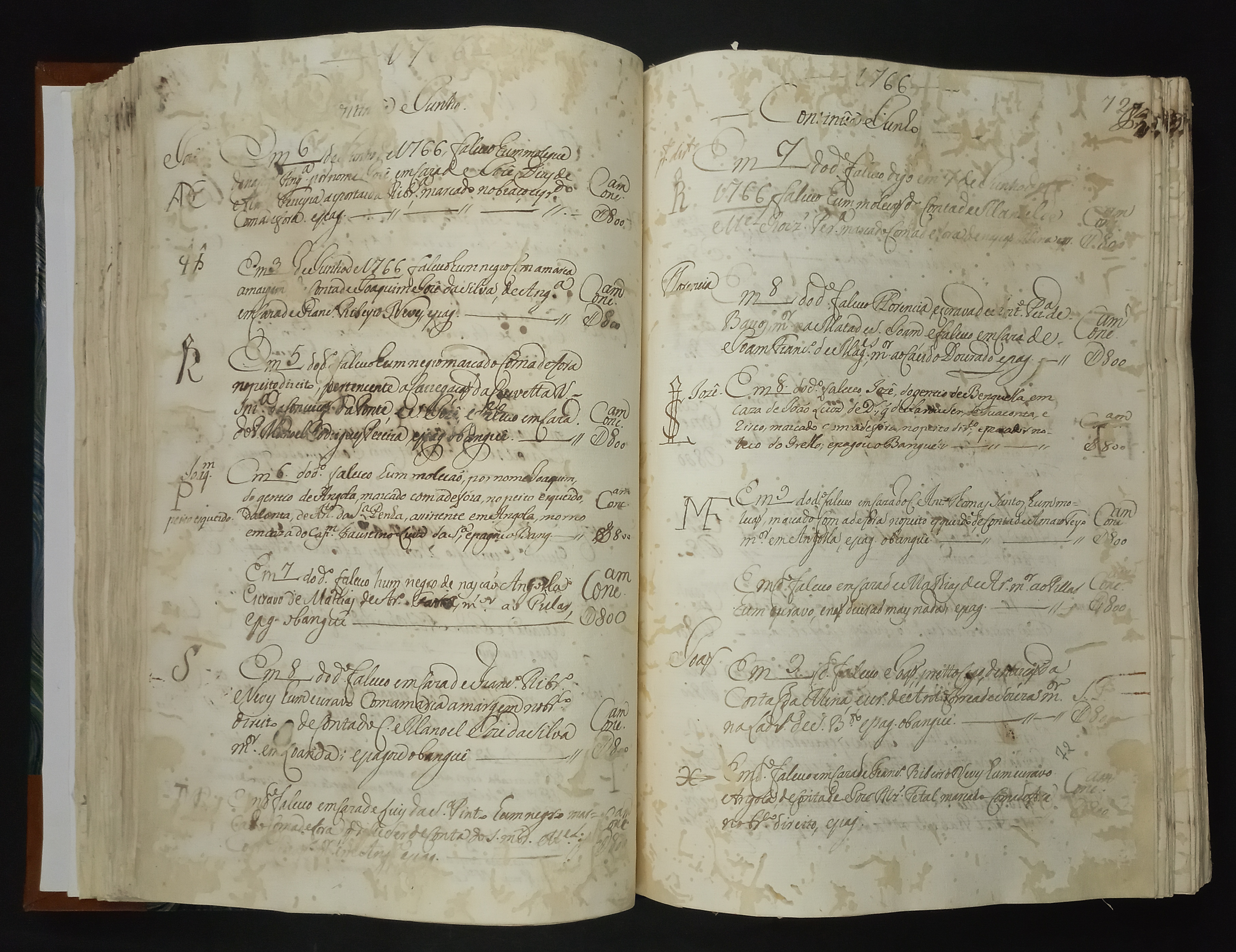
The 11 volumes were written between 1742 and 1856. They contain names of the deceased, date and place of death and on occasion marks on their bodies that could indicate something about their history.

The Coleção de Livros do Banguê (English: Banguê Book Collection) is an 11-volume set of records of the burial expenses of enslaved people in Bahia, Brazil, from the 17th to 19th centuries by the Santa Casa da Misericórdia. Funerals for nearly all social classes in Bahia could only be carried out by the Santa Casa, and the institution maintained detailed records of its expenses. The Banguê collection is recognized as a milestone in the identification of enslaved people, containing data such as name and ethnicity, arrival in Salvador, the owner of the enslaved person, and burial costs. There are also margin notes of marks on the deceased person's body. The collection is in the archives of the Centro de Memória Jorge Calmon of the Santa Casa da Misericordia in Bahia, and received the UNESCO Memory of the World Programme certificate in 2009. The collection "contain traces of identification of these people violently subjected to slavery and generally relegated to invisibility."

== History ==
The Brotherhood of Misericórdia was responsible for burials of citizens of all social classes in Salvador during the Portuguese colonial period in Brazil. The brotherhood transported the bodies of enslaved people in simple coffins called banguê,^{A} a practice of the Santa Casa from 1693. They were then interred in the Campo da Pólvora Cemetery, which was owned by the Santa Casa and reserved for enslaved people of African descent, the excommunicated, criminals, and the poor. The cemetery was small, measuring only approximately 73 square metres (790 ft^{2}); its exact location has been lost. The Santa Casa of Bahia itself was a large slave-holding institution: enslaved people carried out both the construction, cleaning and maintenance of its building, as well as working as gravediggers, caring for tombs, and carrying biers to masses and cemeteries.

It is estimated that between 1742 and 1856 there were approximately 80,000 enslaved people buried by the Santa Casa. The Coleção de Livros do Banguê record that between the years 1741-1800, 49.4% of the buried enslaved people came from ports in Angola, 36.3% from the Mina Coast (roughly the Gulf of Guinea), and only 3.4% were born in Brazil. Numerous funerals were for "recently disembarked Africans"; those who were not baptized by the Catholic Church were listed without a name.

== Footnote ==
A.The banguê was a small-scale sugarcane plantation in northeast Brazil; they were replaced by usinas, or large-scale plantations in the later colonial period.
