= Oração aos Moços =

Speech by Ruy Barbosa

Oração aos Moços (English: Prayer to Young Men) is a famous speech written by the Brazilian writer Ruy Barbosa in 1920. Barbosa, a famous lawyer, journalist, and politician, presents his thoughts on the role of magistrates and lawyers, and gives a retrospective on his own life as an example for upcoming generations.

It was published as a book in 1921.

== Bibliography ==
- Barbosa, Ruy (1921). Oracao Aos Mocos. Forense.
- Santos, Denise; Silva, Glaucia; Gontijo, Viviane (13 March 2019). Contextos: Curso Intermediário de Português (in English and Portuguese). Taylor & Francis. ISBN 9781315454559.
- Padilha, Cristiane Menna Barreto; Azambuja, Ariane Vargas (2019). "O DISCURSO DE RUI BARBOSA AOS FORMANDOS DE ONTEM, HOJE E SEMPRE" (PDF) (in Brazilian Portuguese). UNIVERSIDADE REGIONAL INTEGRADA DO ALTO URUGUAI E DAS MISSÕES: 64–70.
