= Josina Machel Hospital =

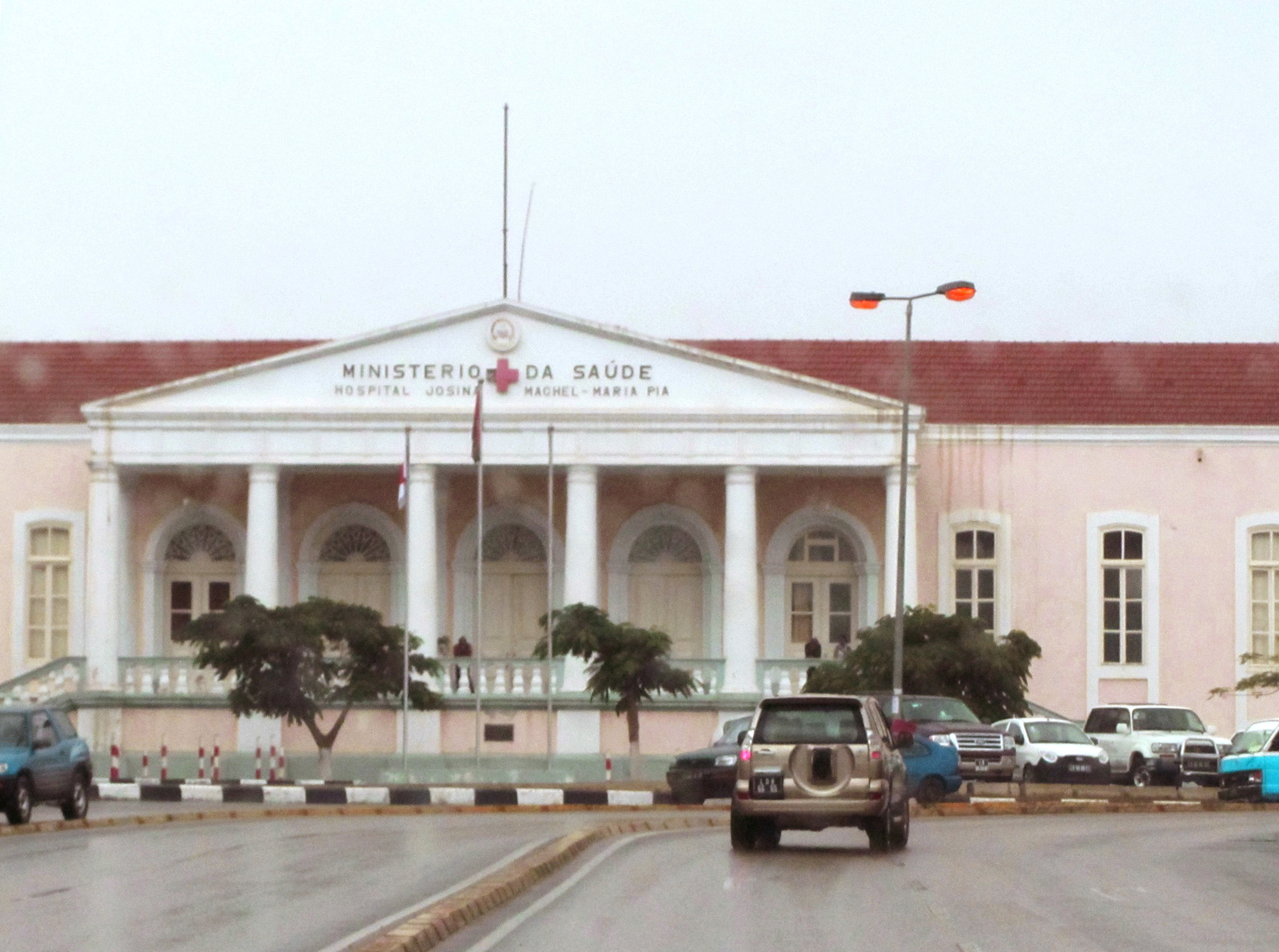
- Josina Machel Hospital in 2012

Geography
- Location: Luanda, Angola
- Coordinates: 8.824°S 13.22647°E

Services
- Beds: 534

History
- Former name: Hospital Maria Pia
- Constructed: 1865–1883
- Opened: 1883

Links
- Lists: Hospitals in Angola

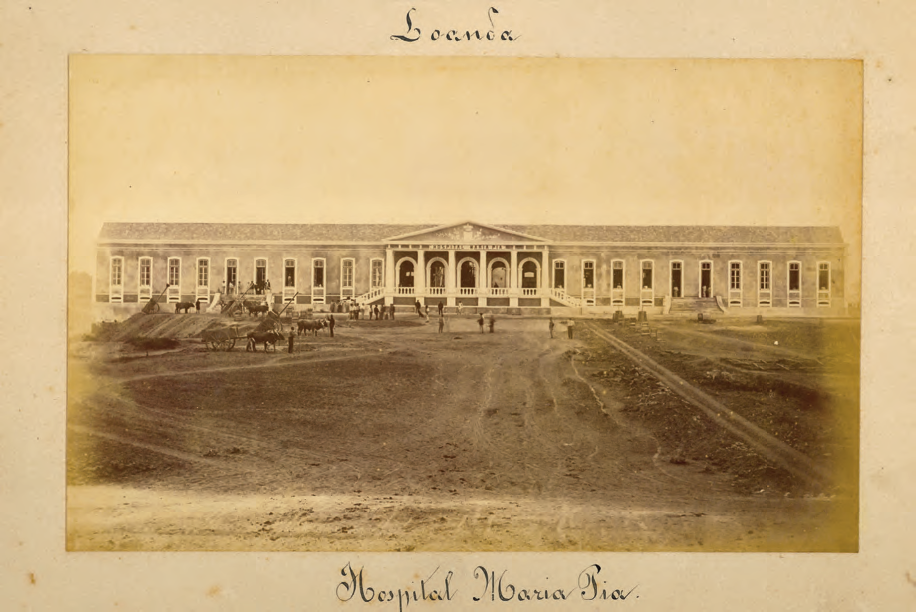
Maria Pia Hospital c. 1870.

Josina Machel Hospital in Luanda is the oldest and largest state hospital in Angola. It is considered the best health facility in the country and is an important historical monument.

== History ==
The institution was originally founded in 1628, by the Santa Casa de Misericórdia of Luanda. The neoclassical building was built in 1865–1883 on the ruins of a Franciscan monastery. It was initially a military hospital and was named Hospital Maria Pia, in honor of Queen Maria Pia of Savoy. After the country became independent (1975) it was renamed in 1977 after the Mozambican resistance fighter Josina Machel and declared a historical cultural asset in 1981.

During the Angolan civil war between 1975 and 2002 the hospital became very run down. There was also a shortage of medical supplies and the referral system barely functioned. The building was dilapidated and wards had to be closed because the roof leaked. Only the emergency department and some specialist services kept going.

The Angolan government made it a high priority in the Five-Year Health Development Plan (2000 – 2004), but their resources were very limited. It was supported by financial assistance by the Japan International Cooperation Agency and fundamentally renovated and refurbished. Their project which ran from 2002 to 2005 at a cost of nearly 4 million yen also included training for staff in Japan to support and maintain the improved facilities in the hospital. During those four years the number of patients in the hospital increased at an average annual rate of 12%. By 2010 it had 534 beds. 48,579 outpatients were treated, nearly four times more than in 2006 and there were 16,448 surgical operations, twice the number in 2006. The budget of the hospital in 2009 was 3,244,483 thousand kwanza.

== See also ==
- Healthcare in Angola
- List of hospitals in Angola
