= Ruy Barbosa =

Brazilian politician (1849–1923)

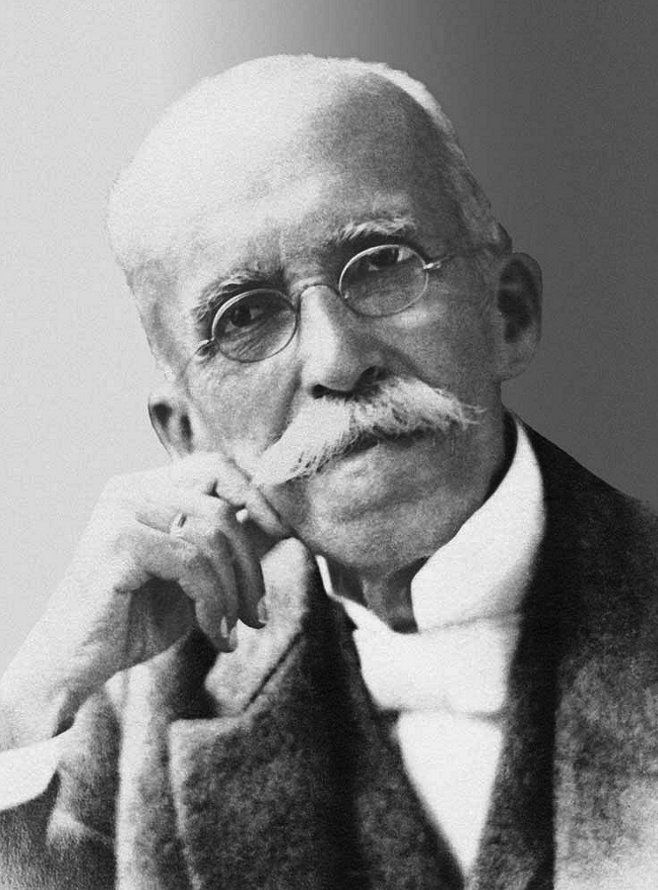
- Barbosa in 1907

Judge of the Permanent Court of International Justice
- In office 30 January 1922 – 1 March 1923
- Preceded by: Office established
- Succeeded by: Epitácio Pessoa

Vice President of the Federal Senate
- In office 25 October 1906 – 25 June 1909
- Preceded by: Joaquim Murtinho
- Succeeded by: Quintino Bocaiuva

Senator for Bahia
- In office 15 November 1890 – 1 March 1923
- Preceded by: Seat established by Decree No. 510 of 1890
- Succeeded by: Pedro Lago

Minister of Finance
- In office 15 November 1889 – 21 January 1891
- President: Deodoro da Fonseca
- Preceded by: Viscount of Ouro Preto
- Succeeded by: Tristão de Alencar Araripe

Member of the Chamber of Deputies
- In office 15 December 1878 – 3 September 1884
- Constituency: Bahia

Personal details
- Born: 5 November 1849 Salvador, Bahia, Brazil
- Died: 1 March 1923 (aged 73) Petrópolis, Rio de Janeiro, Brazil
- Party: Liberal (1871–1889)
- Spouse: Maria Augusta Viana Bandeira (m. 1876)
- Children: 5
- Parents: João José Barbosa de Oliveira (father); Maria Adélia Barbosa de Almeida (mother)
- Relatives: Marina Ruy Barbosa (great-great-great-granddaughter)
- Education: Faculty of Law of Largo de São Francisco

Ruy Barbosa de Oliveira (5 November 1849 – 1 March 1923), also known as Rui Barbosa, was a Brazilian politician, writer, jurist, philologist, journalist and diplomat.

A prominent defender of civil liberties who called for the abolition of slavery in Brazil, Barbosa represented Brazil in the second Hague convention, and argued for Brazil's participation in World War I on the side of the Allies. He also personally ordered the destruction of all government records pertaining to slavery while being Minister of Finance, as an effort to prevent previous slaveowners from receiving any sort of financial compensation. His defence of individual freedom led to his public condemning of communism and obligatory vaccinations.

Barbosa was a founding member of the Brazilian Academy of Letters, alongside names such as Machado de Assis, Viscount of Taunay, Joaquim Nabuco and Olavo Bilac. He would also act as a president for the organization from 1908 to 1919.

During the presidency of Floriano Peixoto, Barbosa was forced into exile due to the disastrous consequences of his policies in his time as Minister of Finance. After his exile, Barbosa ran for presidency multiple times, though, ultimately, all of this attempts would fail.

== Early life ==
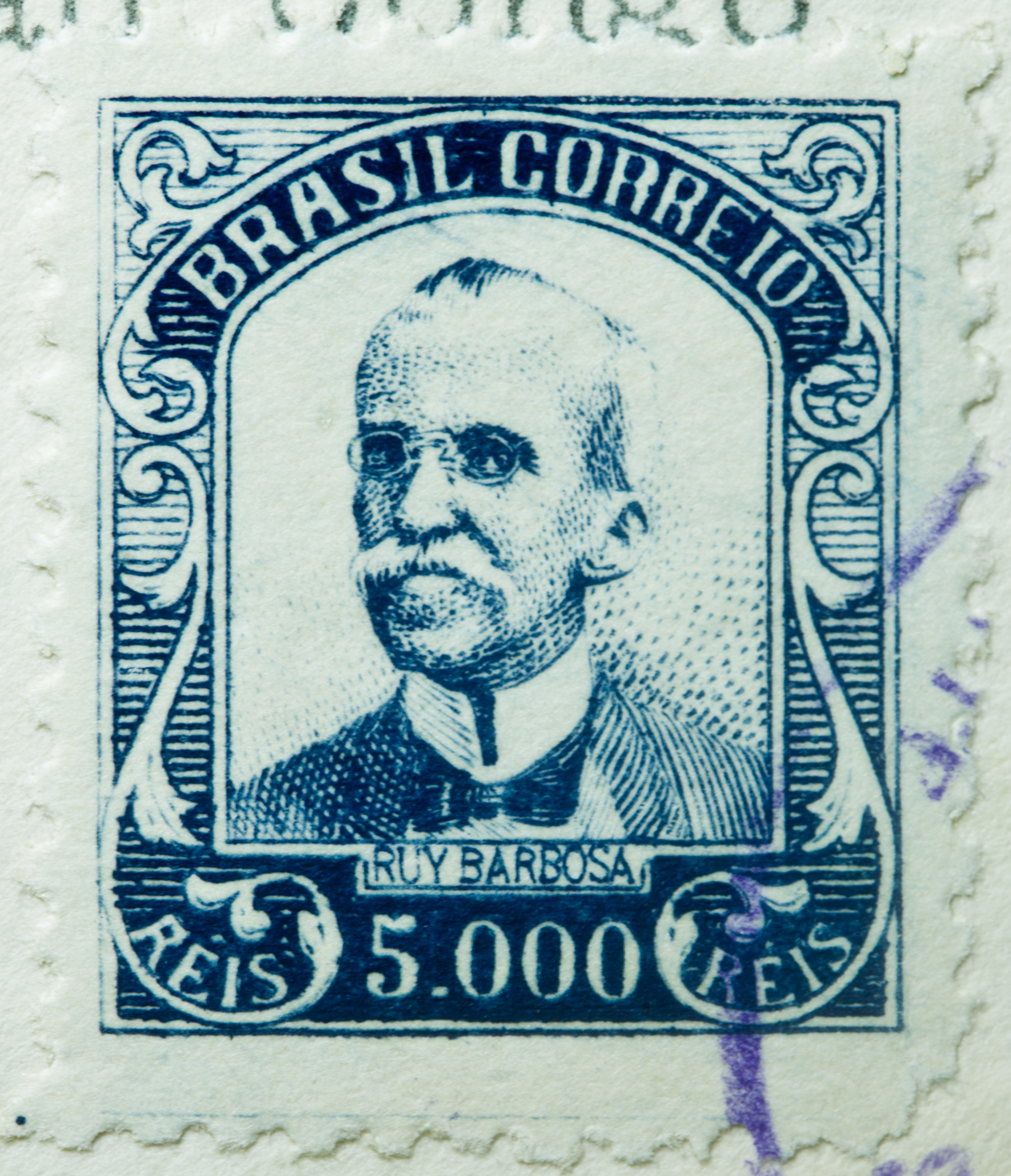
A depiction of Barbosa on a stamp

Rui Barbosa was born in Salvador, Bahia. He gave his first public speech for the abolition of slavery when he was 19. For the rest of his life he remained an uncompromising defender of civil liberties. Slavery in Brazil was finally abolished by the Lei Áurea ("Golden Law") in 1888. He was also one of the republicanist participants in the 1889 coup to overthrow Dom Pedro II, though in later years he would praise the late deposed monarch.

Part of Barbosa's legacy to history is that he authorised, as Minister of Finance on 14 December 1890, the destruction of most government records relating to slavery. The avowed reason for this destruction, which took several years to be enacted and was followed by his successors, was to erase the "stain" of slavery on Brazilian history. However, historians today agree that Barbosa was actually aiming to prevent any possible indemnification of the former slave-owners for this liberation. Indeed, eleven days after the abolition of slavery, a law project was deposed at the Chamber, proposing some indemnification to the slave owners.

== Political career ==
=== Political stances ===
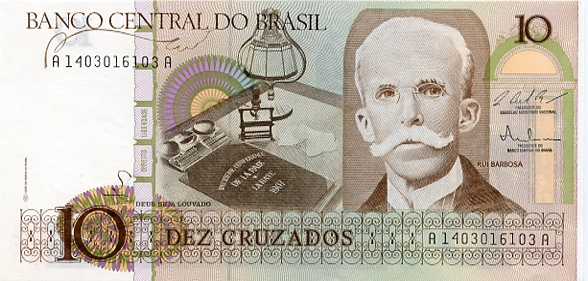
Rui Barbosa on a 1986 10 Brazilian cruzado banknote

Barbosa's liberal ideas were influential in drafting of the first republican constitution. He was a supporter of fiat money, as opposed to a gold standard, in Brazil. During his term as finance secretary, he implemented far-reaching reforms of Brazil's financial regime, instituting a vigorously expansionist monetary policy. The result was chaos and instability: the so-called fiat experiment resulted in the bubble of encilhamento, a dismal politic-economic failure. Due to his controversial role during it, in the following administration of Floriano Peixoto, he was forced into exile until Floriano's term ended. Years later, after his return he was elected as a Senator. He headed the Brazilian delegation to the 2nd Hague Conference and was brilliant in its deliberations. As candidate of the Civilian Party in the presidential election of 1910, Barbosa waged one of the most memorable campaigns in Brazilian politics. He was not successful and lost to Marshal Hermes da Fonseca. He ran again in the elections of 1914 and 1919, both times losing to the government candidate.

During World War I, he played a key role among those who advocated the Allied cause, arguing that Brazil should be more involved in the war. Barbosa died in Petrópolis, near Rio de Janeiro, in 1923.

== See also ==
- Oração aos Moços

== Bibliography ==
- Turner, CW (2005) [1945], Rui Barbosa: Brazilian crusader for the essential freedoms, New York: Kessinger Publishing, ISBN 1-419-10424-1, originally by Abingdon-Cokesbury Press.

Academic offices
Patron: Evaristo da Veiga	1st Academic of the 10th chair of the Brazilian Academy of Letters; 28 January 1897–1 March 1923	Succeeded by Laudelino Freire
Preceded by Machado de Assis	President of the Brazilian Academy of Letters; 3 December 1908–15 May 1919	Succeeded by Domício da Gama
