= Saubara =

Coordinates: 12°45′S 38°45′W

- Municipality
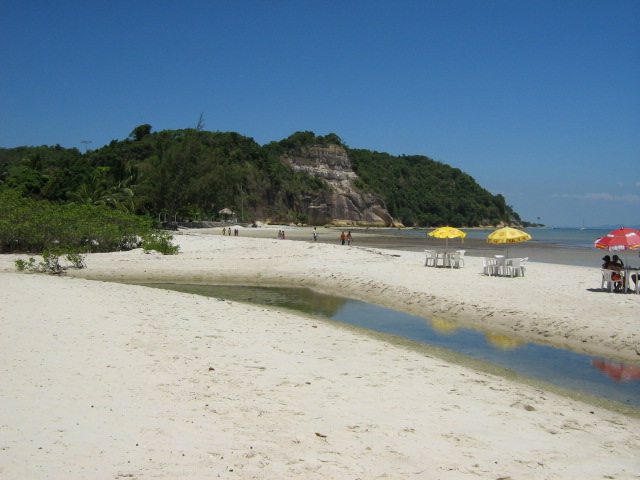

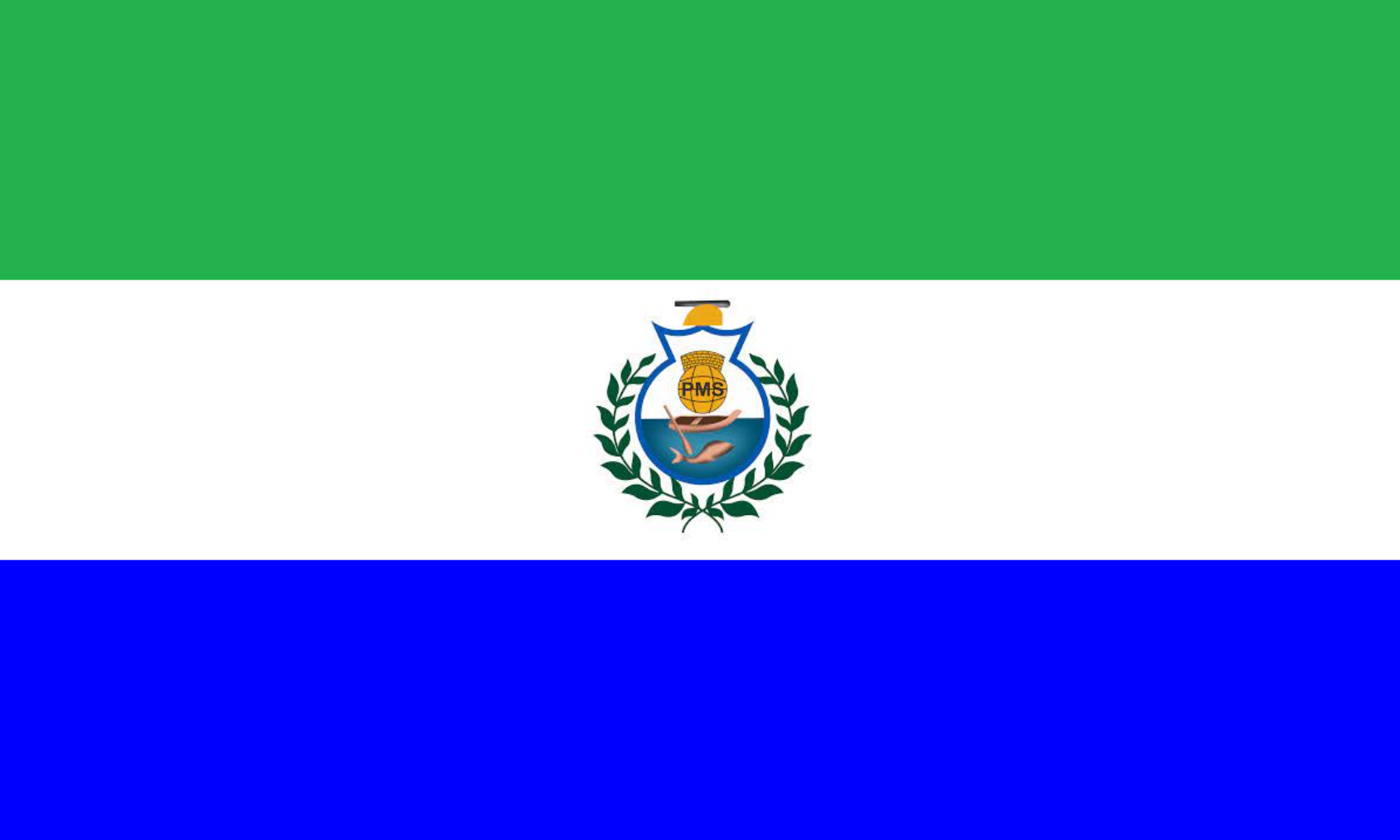
- Flag
- Interactive map of Saubara
- Country: Brazil
- Region: Nordeste
- State: Bahia

Population (2020)
  - Total: 12,105
- Time zone: UTC−3 (BRT)

Saubara is a municipality in the state of Bahia in the North-East region of Brazil.

== See also ==
- List of municipalities in Bahia
