= Santa Casa de Misericórdia of Feira de Santana =

- Santa Casa de Misericórdia de Feira de Santana
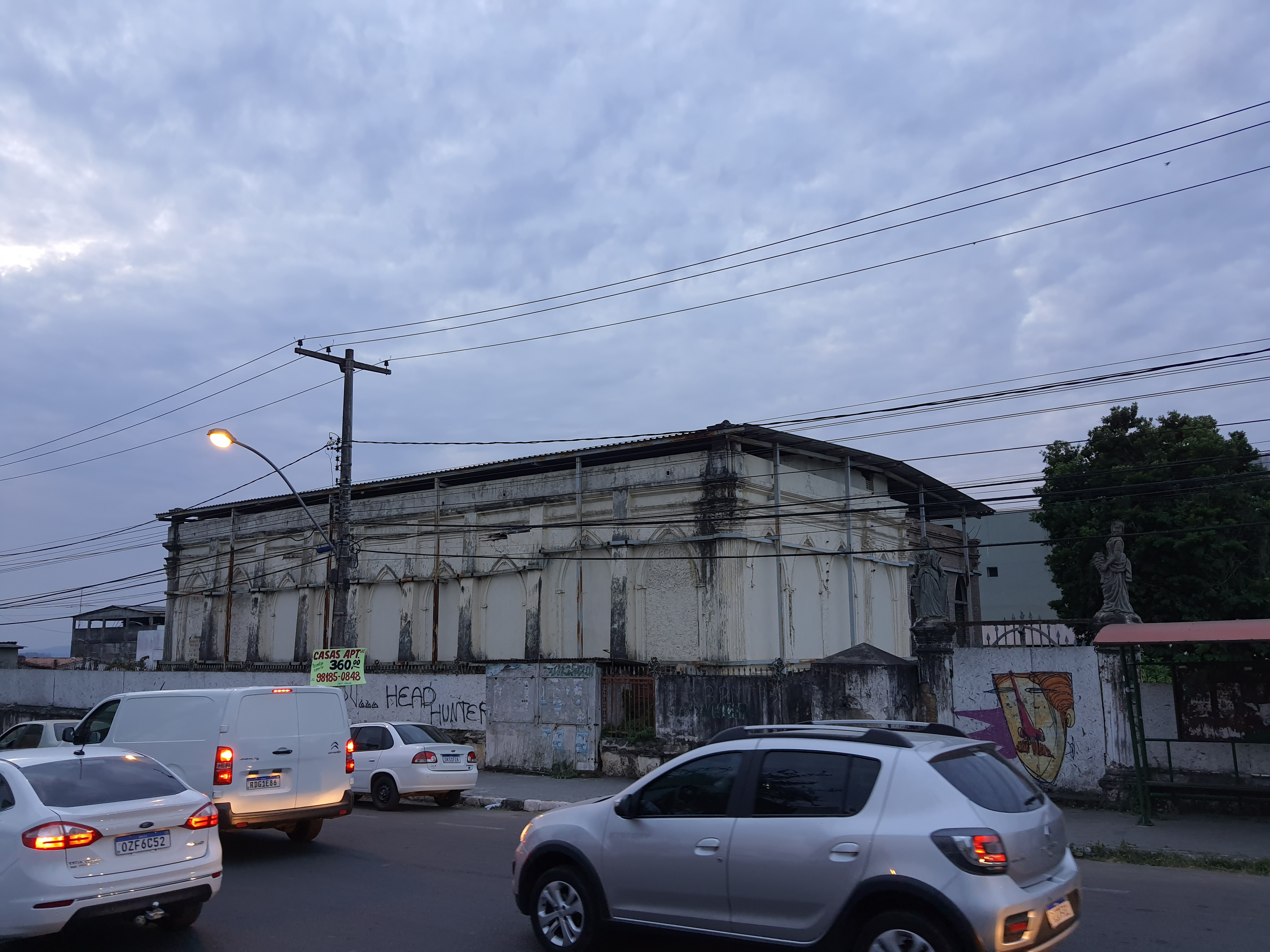

- Location within Brazil

General information
- Type: philanthropic organization and hospital
- Location: Feira de Santana, Bahia, Brazil
- Coordinates: 12.258831838505584°S 38.97061928890804°W
- Completed: ca. 1850

Technical details
- Floor count: 2
- Floor area: 495 square metres (5,330 ft^{2})

The Building of the Santa Casa de Misericórdia of Feira de Santana (Portuguese: Prédio da Santa Casa de Misericórdia de Feira de Santana) is an 18th-century mansion and medical building in Feira de Santana, Bahia, Brazil. It was established in the Portuguese colonial period as a branch of the Santa Casa da Misericórdia, a lay Portuguese organization to treat the sick and disabled. The building was listed as a state heritage site by the Institute of Artistic and Cultural Heritage of Bahia in 2008.

== Location ==
The Building of the Santa Casa de Misericórdia faces Praça da Piedade, a narrow public plaza that extends west from the larger public squares of the St. Ann Cathedral and the Bandstand at Praça da Matriz. The three structures were built in the 19th century and are protected structures of the State of Bahia. It is located on Rua da Misericórdia, which connects the cathedral to the building on the Santa Casa.

== History ==
The first Santa Casa outside of Salvador was built in Cachoeira in the 18th century; the Santa Casa de Misericórdia of Santo Amaro dates to 1778, and was followed by others in Bahia. The establishment of a Santa Casa in Feira de Santana occurred in conjunction with a visit by Emperor Dom Pedro II. The Building of the Santa Casa de Misericórdia of Feira de Santana was built in the 1850s Colonel João Pedreira to house Dom Pedro II on his tour of the Northeast region of Brazil. Dom Pedro II did not stay at the mansion during his tour of 1859, but donated 500 contos de reais (2:000$000) to build a hospital associated with the Santa Casa da Misericórdia.

Prominent citizens of Feira de Santana were unable to build a large hospital despite the donation of Dom Pedro II and significant fund raising. In its place, João Pedreira offered to sell the Brotherhood of the Santa Casa (Irmandade da Santa Casa) the building in 1879. It was sold in 1880, and was inaugurated as the new headquarters of the Santa Casa in 1884. The hospital, named Hospital Dom Pedro Alcântara, was likely inaugurated in 1865, as seen on a plaque bearing the date. As the population of the municipality increased, the hospital expanded to include 39 hospital beds, an infirmary, and an operating room. It was closely linked to the Catholic Church, with the parish priest being a member of its board and the hospital bed consisting of nuns and other women of lay religious orders.

Hospital Dom Pedro Alcântara left the building in 1950 to move to a new location. The building became the headquarters of the 1st Military Police Battalion (1st BPM/FS) in 1947. The Military Police battalion left for a new headquarters in 1984. The building was adapted as a permanent childcare facility in 1984 and is locally referred to as the Palácio do Menor ("Palace of the Minors"). The building was soon abandoned. A report in the newspaper A Tarde on January 21, 1986 stated that "the glass in the doors and windows has already been broken, and termites are devouring the roof. The floorboards are being removed and the walls, in at least three halls, are crumbling."

=== Cemetery ===
The Santa Casa also assumed responsibility of establishing a cemetery in Feira de Santana. The Piedade Cemetery (Cemitério Piedade) was established on land owned by Felipe Pedreira de Cerqueira, directly south of the hospital. The cemetery remains under the management of the Brotherhood of the Santa Casa, but its monuments are in poor condition.

== Structure ==
The Building of the Santa Casa de Misericórdia of Feira de Santana has two stories and covers 495 square metres (5,330 ft^{2}). It has some Gothic revival elements, a rarity in Bahia, the only other example being found in the municipality of Tanquinho. The building has a rectangular floor plan, with its primary rooms at ground level and a lower floor opening to the slope at the rear of the building. The entrance to the building is to the side of the building, rather than from the street. It has a lobby, two grand rooms, and a kitchen and dining room at the opposite side of the building from the entrance. It is surrounded by a series of high windows with high, pointed arches. There are nine windows facing the street, each with pilasters between. The doors were framed in carved woods with glasswork. An iron grille fence once surrounded the building.

== Protected status ==
The Institute of Artistic and Cultural Heritage of Bahia listed the Building of the Santa Casa de Misericórdia of Feira de Santana as a state heritage site in 2008.

== Access ==
The building is abandoned, in an advanced state of ruin, and may not be visited.
