= Santa Casa da Misericórdia de Lisboa =

Portuguese charitable organisation

Lisbon Holy House of Mercy
- Santa Casa da Misericórdia de Lisboa
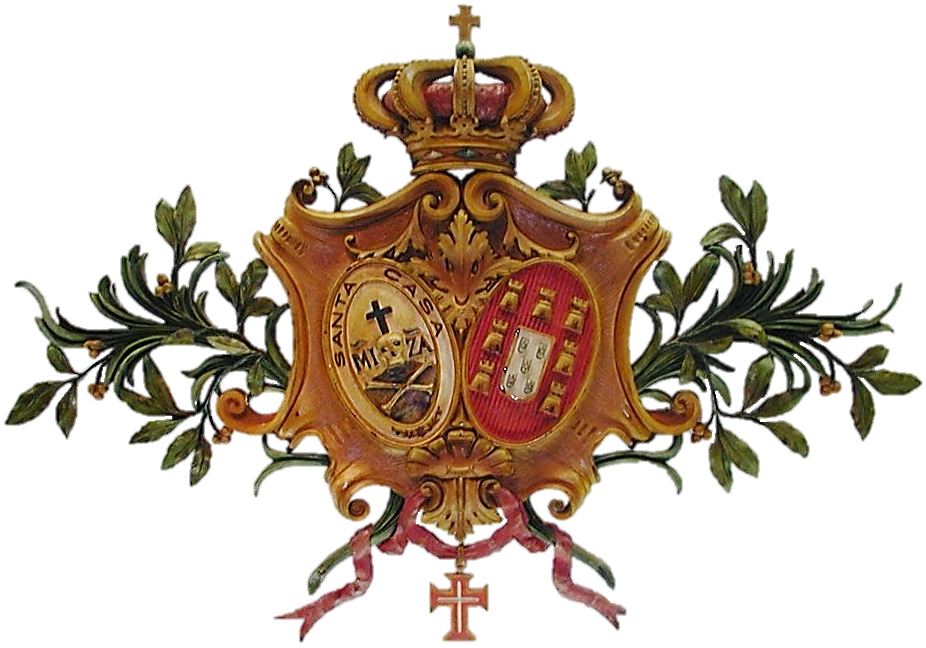
- Coat of Arms

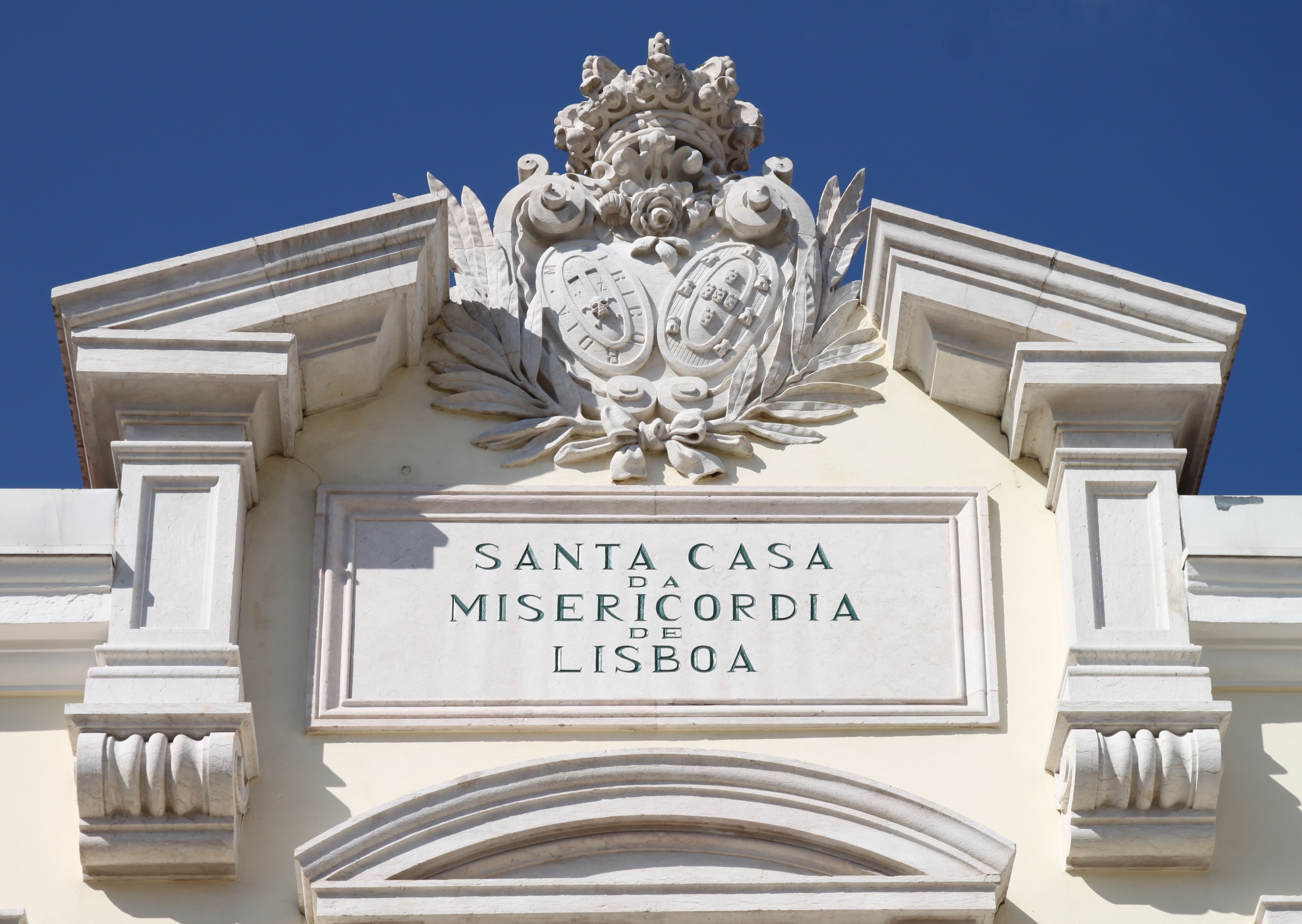

Legal person in the public administrative interest overview
- Formed: August 15, 1498; 527 years ago
- Headquarters: 2, Largo Trindade Coelho; 1200-470 Lisbon
- Motto: Por boas causas ("For good causes")
- Minister responsible: José António Vieira da Silva, Minister of Labour, Solidarity, and Social Security
- Deputy Minister responsible: Cláudia Joaquim, Secretary of State for Social Security
- Legal person in the public administrative interest executive: Paulo Sousa, Chairman
- Key document: Current statutes (Decree-Law no. 235/2008)
- Website: www.scml.pt

The Lisbon Holy House of Mercy MHIH (Portuguese: Santa Casa da Misericórdia de Lisboa) is a Portuguese charitable organisation that, in modern times, serves also as the national lottery and off-course betting operator. In spite of its historical links to the Catholic Church, it is today a secular legal person in the public administrative interest, that is to say, a private legal person, recognised by the authorities as pursuing non-profit-making objects of public interest.

The first of its kind (though many other local Misericórdias were established, throughout Portugal and its overseas colonies), it was established in 1498 by Queen Regent Eleanor of Viseu, as a Brotherhood with the Invocation of Our Lady of Mercy (headquartered in a chapel of the Lisbon Cathedral) comprising "one hundred men of good reputation and sound conscience and honest life" that vowed to support the neediest and to uphold the Fourteen Works of Mercy.

Although a private legal person, the Misericórdia is overseen by the public administration, namely the Minister in charge of the social security system; its Chairman (Provedor), who presides over the Board of Directors, is nominated by the Prime Minister.

== See also ==
- List of Jesuit sites
