= State hospital =

A state hospital is a hospital funded and operated by the government of a state. In some countries, such as South Africa, the term is synonymous with public hospital. In other countries, like the United States, general public hospitals are operated by local governments.

== Psychiatric hospitals ==
In the United States, due in part to the efforts of Dorothea Dix, the term "state hospital" generally refers to a public psychiatric hospital operated by a state government for persons committed to compulsory psychiatric care after being found not guilty of serious violent crimes on the basis of insanity.

In the United Kingdom, the term may refer to one particular psychiatric hospital known as the State Hospital.
