= Health in Angola =

Overview of the health system of Angola

Life expectancy in Angola

Health in Angola is rated among the worst in the world.

In 2022, the Human Rights Measurement Initiative found that Angola was achieving 55.4% of what it should be fulfilling in terms of the right to health based on what should be possible at its level of income. When looking at the right to health with respect to children, Angola achieves 79.0% of what is expected based on its current income. In regards to the right to health amongst the adult population, the country achieves only 71.0% of what is expected based on the nation's level of income. Angola falls into the "very bad" category when evaluating the right to reproductive health because the nation is fulfilling only 16.2% of what the nation is expected to achieve based on the resources (income) it has available.

== History ==
Angola became a member of the World Health Organization on May 15, 1976.

USAID reported that the Angolan government has not had much success in developing an effective health care system since the end of the 27-year-long Angolan Civil War in 2002. According to USAID, during the War as many as 1 million people were killed, 4.5 million people became internally displaced, and 450,000 fled the country as refugees. Due to lack of infrastructure and rapid urbanization, the government has been unable to promote programs that effectively address some of the basic needs of the people. Health care is not available in much of the country.

As of 2012, 54% of the population had access to an improved water source and 60% had access to improved/shared sanitation.

In September 2014, the Angolan Institute for Cancer Control (IACC) was created by presidential decree, and it will integrate the National Health Service in Angola. The purpose of this new center is to ensure the health and medical care in oncology, policy implementation, programs and plans for prevention and specialized treatment. This cancer institute will be assumed as a reference institution in the central and southern regions of Africa.

== Health status ==
=== Life expectancy ===
The 2014 CIA estimated average life expectancy in Angola was 51 years.

| Period | Life expectancy in Years | Period | Life expectancy in Years |
|---|---|---|---|
| 1950–1955 | 31.4 | 1985–1990 | 41.5 |
| 1955–1960 | 32.5 | 1990–1995 | 42.2 |
| 1960–1965 | 34.1 | 1995–2000 | 44.7 |
| 1965–1970 | 36.0 | 2000–2005 | 50.0 |
| 1970–1975 | 38.1 | 2005–2010 | 55.6 |
| 1975–1980 | 40.0 | 2010–2015 | 60.2 |
| 1980–1985 | 40.9 | | |

Source: UN World Population Prospects

==== Malaria ====
Malaria in Angola is very prevalent in the northern part of the country due to the climate and appears more seasonally in the south. The majority of the population lives in the northern areas, in cities such as Luanda. Malaria is a huge concern for maternal health, contributing about 25 percent of the total maternal mortality alone. In 2009, UNICEF, NMCP, WHO, and other organizations partnered together in an effort to reduce the malaria burden.

In 2008, US President Barack Obama announced the Global Health Initiatives. One of these Initiatives includes the Malaria Operational Plan, which is a program that allocates funds to be used in order to improve health in Angola and other African countries afflicted with malaria. In Angola, the Malaria Operational Plan was implemented to decrease the number of women affected by malaria and improve maternal health. Angola was one of the first countries to receive aid and to have programs implemented to reduce the risk of malaria, as well as increase the number of healthy pregnancies.

=== Infectious diseases ===
Due to Angola's location, the climate is ideal for many tropical diseases. Angola has a narrow coastal plain that rises into a high plateau in the country's interior. Rain forests are prevalent in the north, and in the south, the land is dry. The CIA reports that malaria and schistosomiasis are prevalent in the country.

These diseases and others, such as tuberculosis and especially HIV/Aids, increase the complications and dangers faced by women during pregnancy.

In 2014, Angola launched a national vaccination campaign against measles, extended to every child under ten years old in all 18 provinces in the country. The measure is part of the Strategic Plan for the Elimination of Measles 2014–2020 created by the Angolan Ministry of Health which includes strengthening routine immunization, proper dealing with measles cases, national campaigns, introducing a second dose of vaccination in the national routine vaccination calendar and active epidemiological surveillance for measles. This campaign took place together with the vaccination against polio and vitamin A supplementation.

=== HIV/AIDS in Angola ===
Angola has a large HIV/AIDS infected population. The Joint United Nations Programme on HIV/AIDS (UNAIDS) estimated adult prevalence at the end of 2003 at 3.9% – over 420,000 infected people. Angola's 27-year civil war (1975–2002), deterred the spread of HIV by making large portions of the country inaccessible. Angola was thus cut off from most contact with neighboring countries that had higher HIV infection rates. With the end of the war, transportation routes and communication are reopening, therefore enabling a greater potential for the spread of HIV/AIDS. Current statistics indicate that the border provinces, especially certain areas bordering Namibia and the Democratic Republic of the Congo, currently have higher prevalence than the rest of the country.

Unhealthy individuals and populations pose a higher risk of infections when exposed to pathogens. Sexually transmitted diseases, including HIV/AIDS, are no exception to this rule. Stillwaggon states that many of the populations in Sub-Saharan Africa have a high prevalence of malnutrition, malaria, parasite infections, and schistosomiasis. These health conditions increase an individual's susceptibility of contracting HIV/AIDS. In that region, social conditions also play a major role in HIV transmission. Poverty, inadequate nutrition, unclean water, poor sanitation, and unsafe health care all play a major role in the prevalence of AIDS.

=== Maternal health ===
Angola represents one of the highest maternal death rates in the world. Results vary, but the estimated maternal mortality ratio (MMR) toward the end of the Civil War was between 1,281 and 1,500 maternal deaths to 100,000 live births. Despite the improvements that have been made, the Human Development Index for 2011 shows a poor level of maternal health in Angola. A high level of adolescent fertility and low use of contraceptives for women of all ages was reported. This is observed by the high total fertility rate. These factors contribute to an elevated risk of health problems during pregnancy and childbirth.

== See also ==
- Healthcare in Angola
- COVID-19 pandemic in Angola
