= Santa Casa da Misericórdia =

Charitable organization in Portugal

Santa Casa da Misericórdia Holy House of Mercy (English)
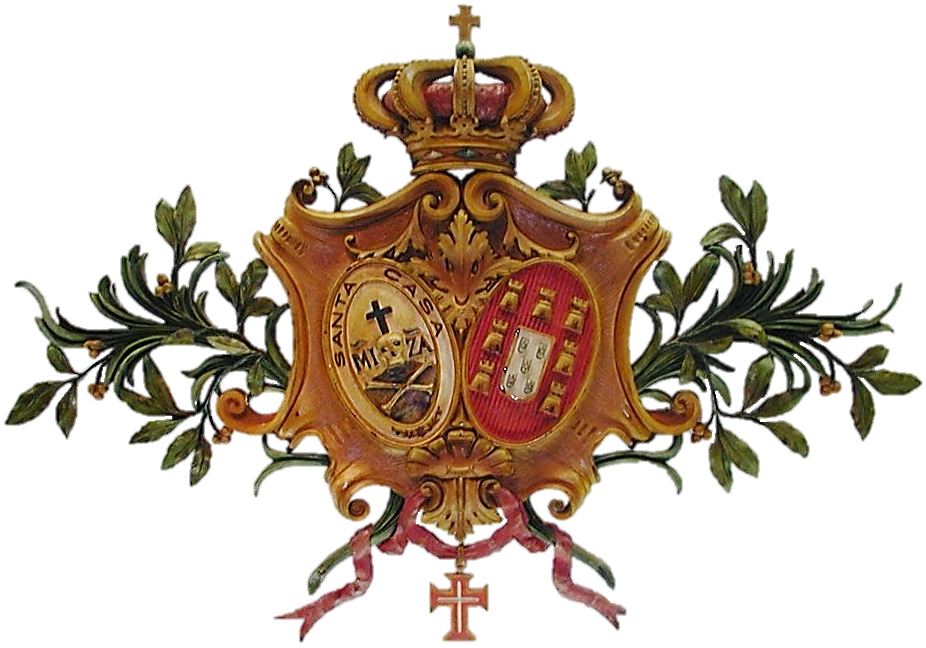
- Coat of Arms

Agency overview
- Formed: August 15, 1498; 527 years ago
- Motto: Por boas causas ("For good causes")

Santa Casa da Misericórdia is a charitable institution whose mission is to treat and support the sick, disabled people, and orphans. Founded in Lisbon in 1498 by Queen Leonor of Portugal, the institution grew into a network of charitable organizations spanning across the Portuguese Empire and there are now Santas Casas da Misericórdia located across Portugal, Brazil, and the rest of the Portuguese-speaking world.

== History ==
=== Early origins ===
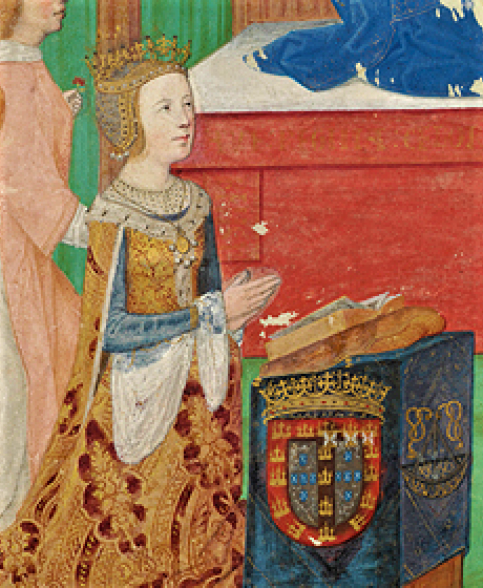
Queen Leonor of Portugal founded the institution in 1498, when she established the Santa Casa da Misericórdia de Lisboa.

The institution traces its official foundation to 1498, when Queen Leonor opened the Misericórdia of Lisbon. Recently made a widow by the death of King John II of Portugal, the Queen had begun dedicating herself intensely to the sick, poor, orphans, prisoners, artists, and sponsored the founding of the brotherhood, based on the model of previous Italian charities, first founded in Florence in 1244.

The operations of the Misericórdia were overseen by 30 noblemen and 30 laymen in charge of carrying out the 14 Works of Mercy which the Misericórdia committed itself to.

At the encouragement of King Manuel I of Portugal, and his successors, similar organizations were created in many other cities and towns of Portugal and of the former Portuguese Empire, like in Brazil, Macau and even in Nagasaki, Japan.

The performance of these institutions had two phases: the first one comprised the period from the mid-eighteenth century to 1837, of a charitable nature; the second, from 1838 to 1940, with concerns of a philanthropic nature.

=== Expansion across the Portuguese Empire ===
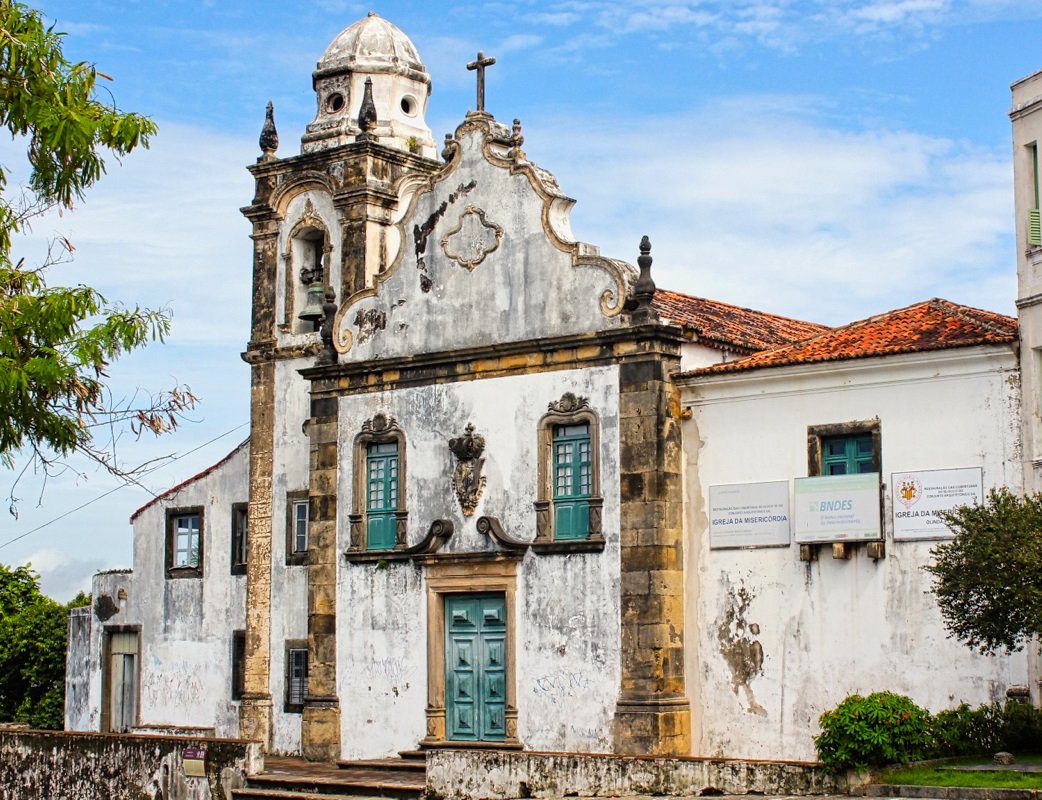
The Santa Casa de Misericórdia in Olinda, founded in 1539, was the first hospital established in Brazil.

The first Santa Casa to be established in Brazil was established in 1539, in the city of Olinda, in the colony of New Lusitania, which was the first hospital in Colonial Brazil.

The Santa Casa da Misericórdia of Macau, in China, was established in 1569.

The Santa Casa de Misericórdia of Luanda, in Angola, was established in 1628.

=== Today ===
The União das Misericórdias Portuguesas (UMP) (in Portuguese) provides additional information on the Misericórdias in Portugal and throughout the world. Currently, there are 388 active Misericórdias in Portugal and over 2000 similar organizations in Brazil.

== Beliefs ==
The "14 Works of Mercy" which the Santa Casa da Misericórdia commits itself to are split into seven of spiritual nature and seven of corporeal nature.

The seven of spiritual nature are:

- to teach the humble
- to give good advice
- to correct through charity those who do wrong
- to console those who suffer
- to pardon those who offend
- to suffer patiently
- to pray for the living and for the deceased

and seven of corporeal nature:

- to free the enslaved (captive) and to visit the imprisoned
- to heal and assist the ill
- to clothe the naked
- to give food to the hungry
- to give drink to the thirsty
- to shelter travelers (pilgrims)
- to bury the dead

All works have their roots in Christian doctrine, found in biblical texts of the Gospel of St. Matthew and the Epistles of St. Paul and other doctors of the Catholic Church. To do this, the fellowship often does not need to have a physical institution, enforcing the fourteen works on the streets, in prisons, etc.

== Santas Casas around the world ==
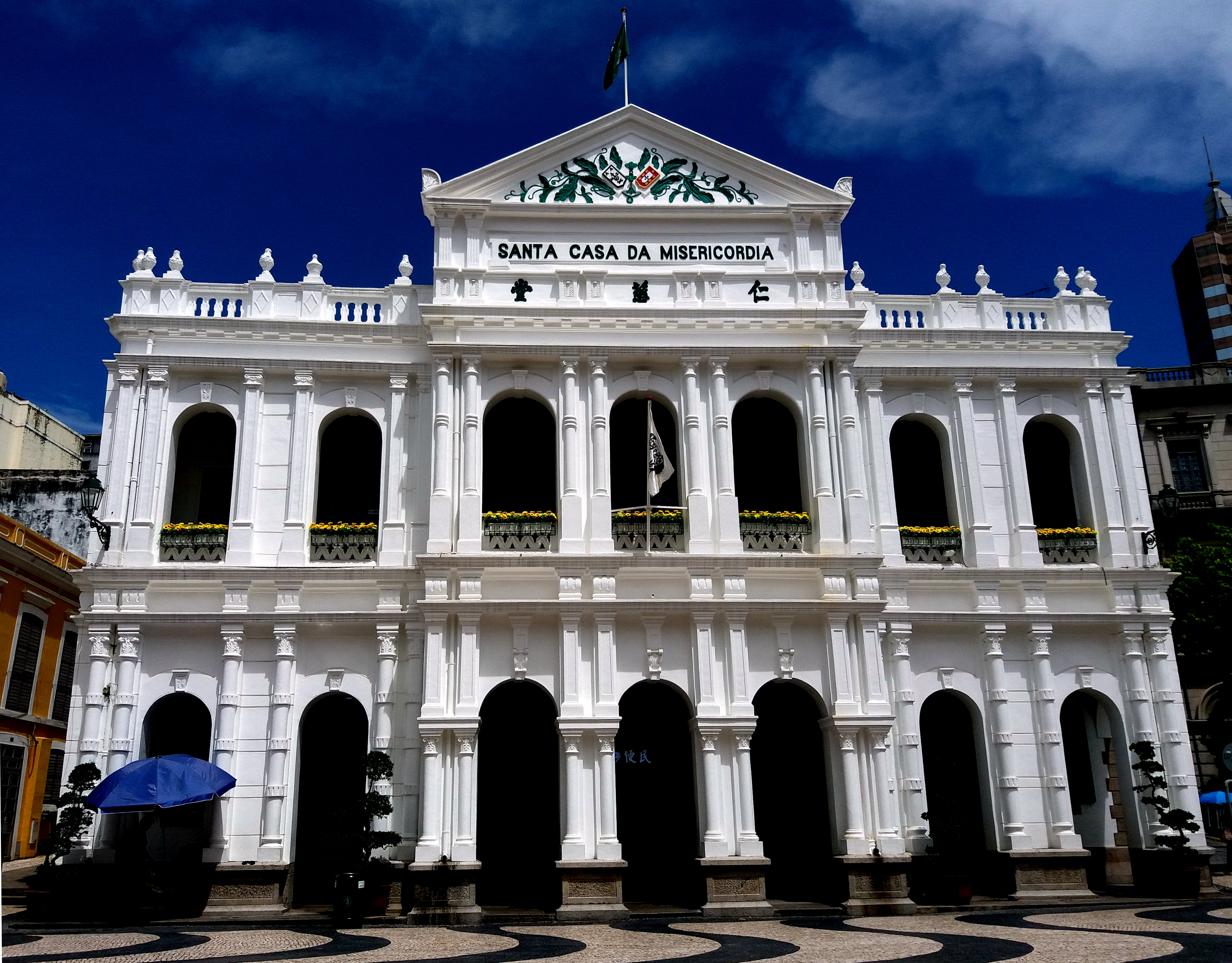
Santa Casa of Macau, China

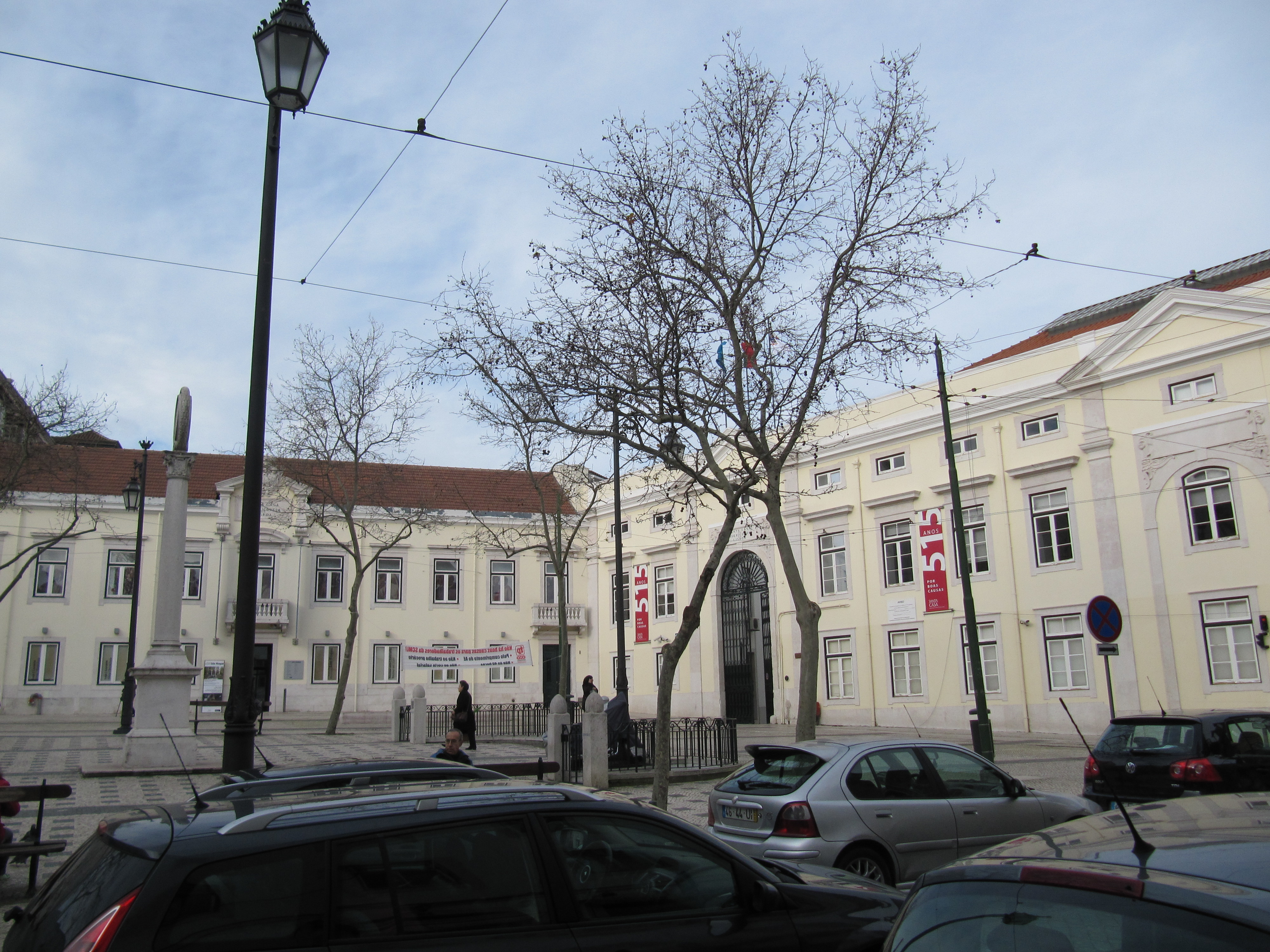
Santa Casa of Lisbon, Portugal

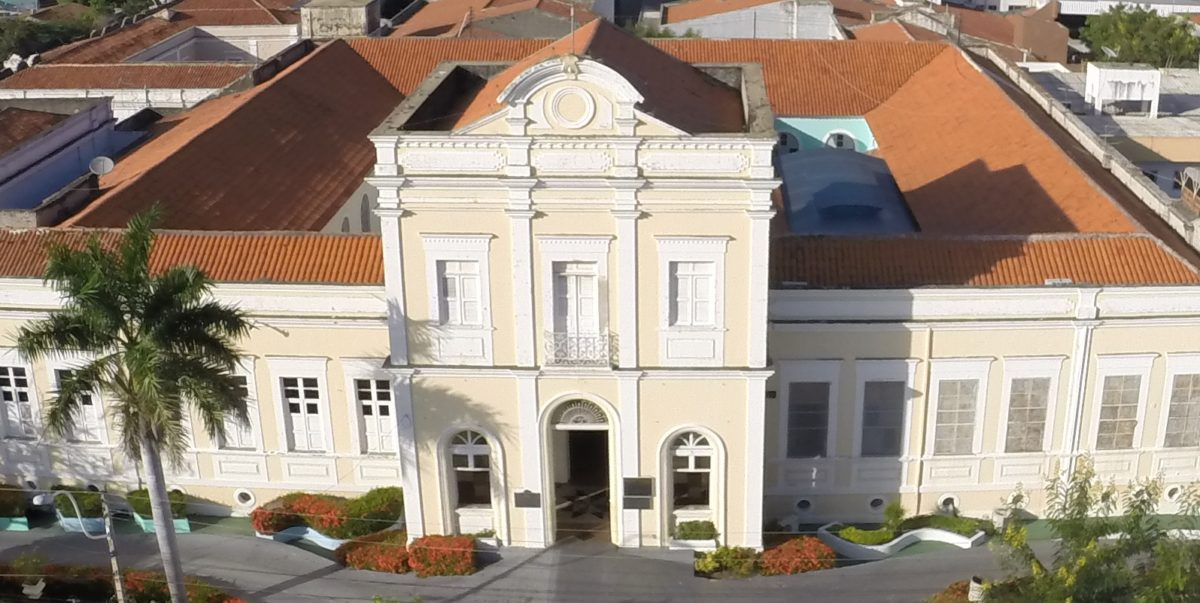
Santa Casa of Sobral, Brazil

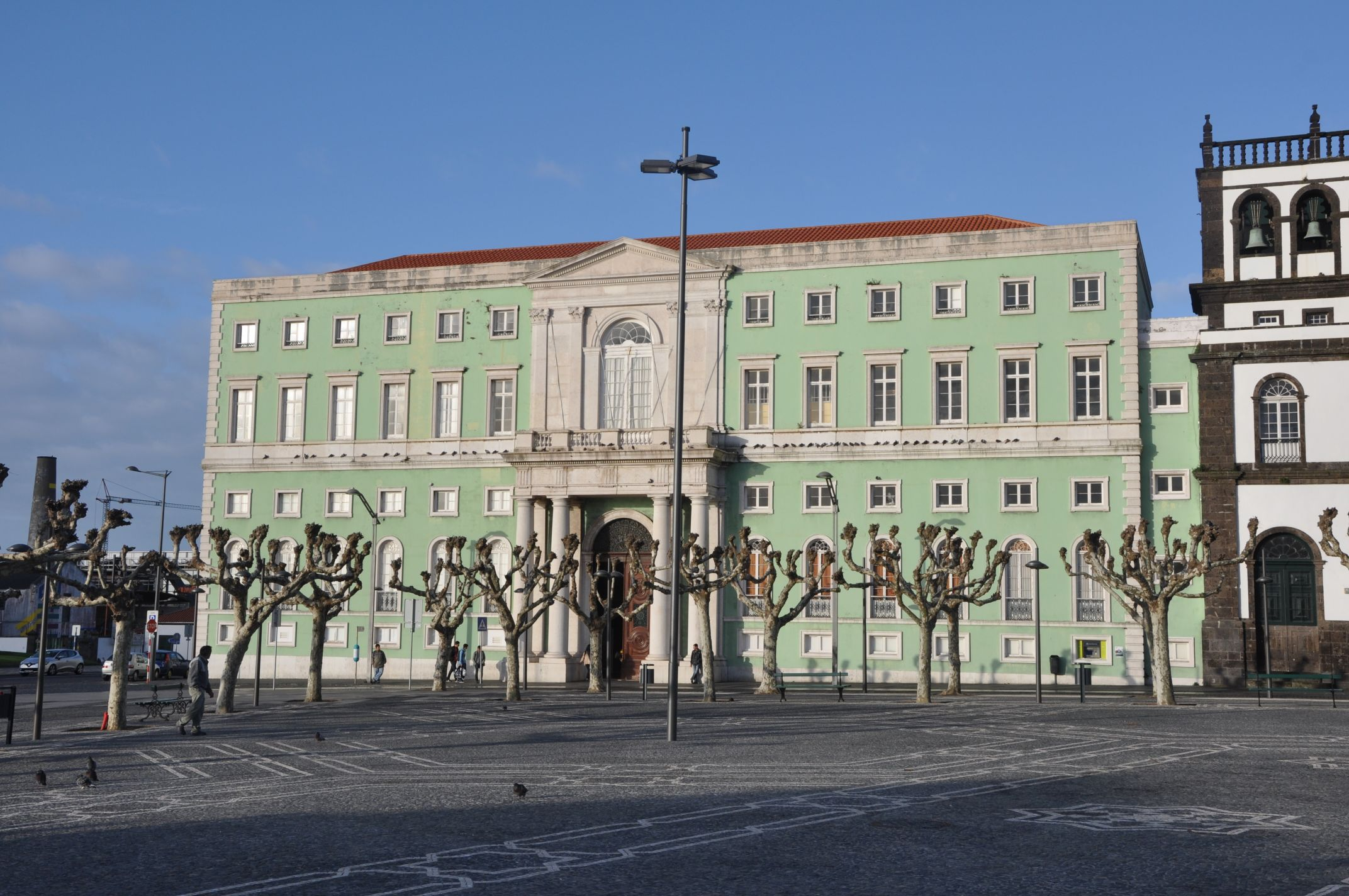
Santa Casa of Ponta Delgada, Azores

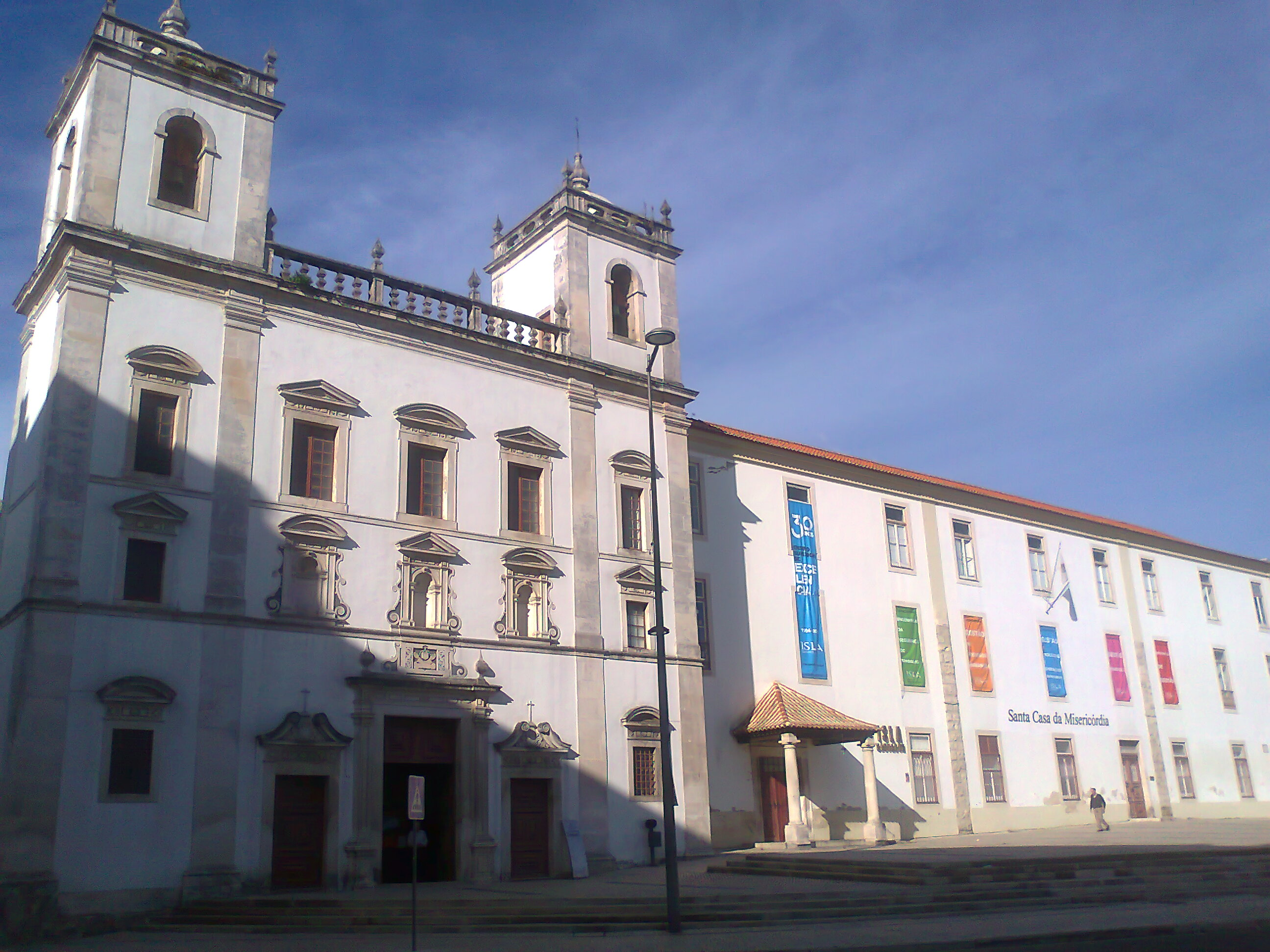
Santa Casa of Santarém, Portugal

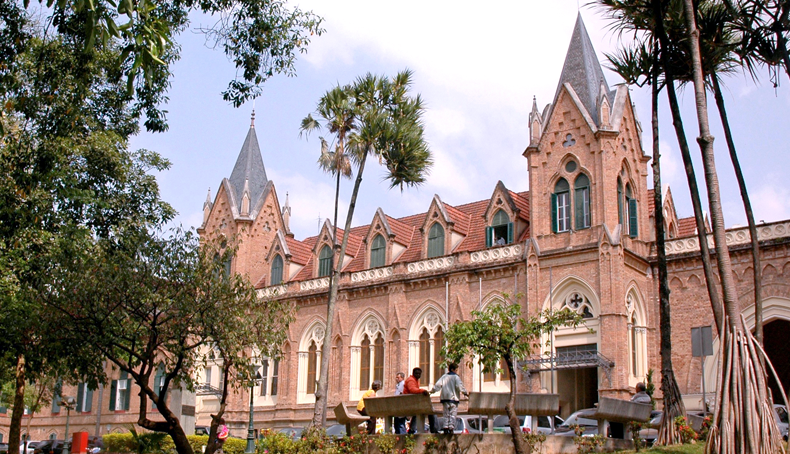
Santa Casa of São Paulo, Brazil

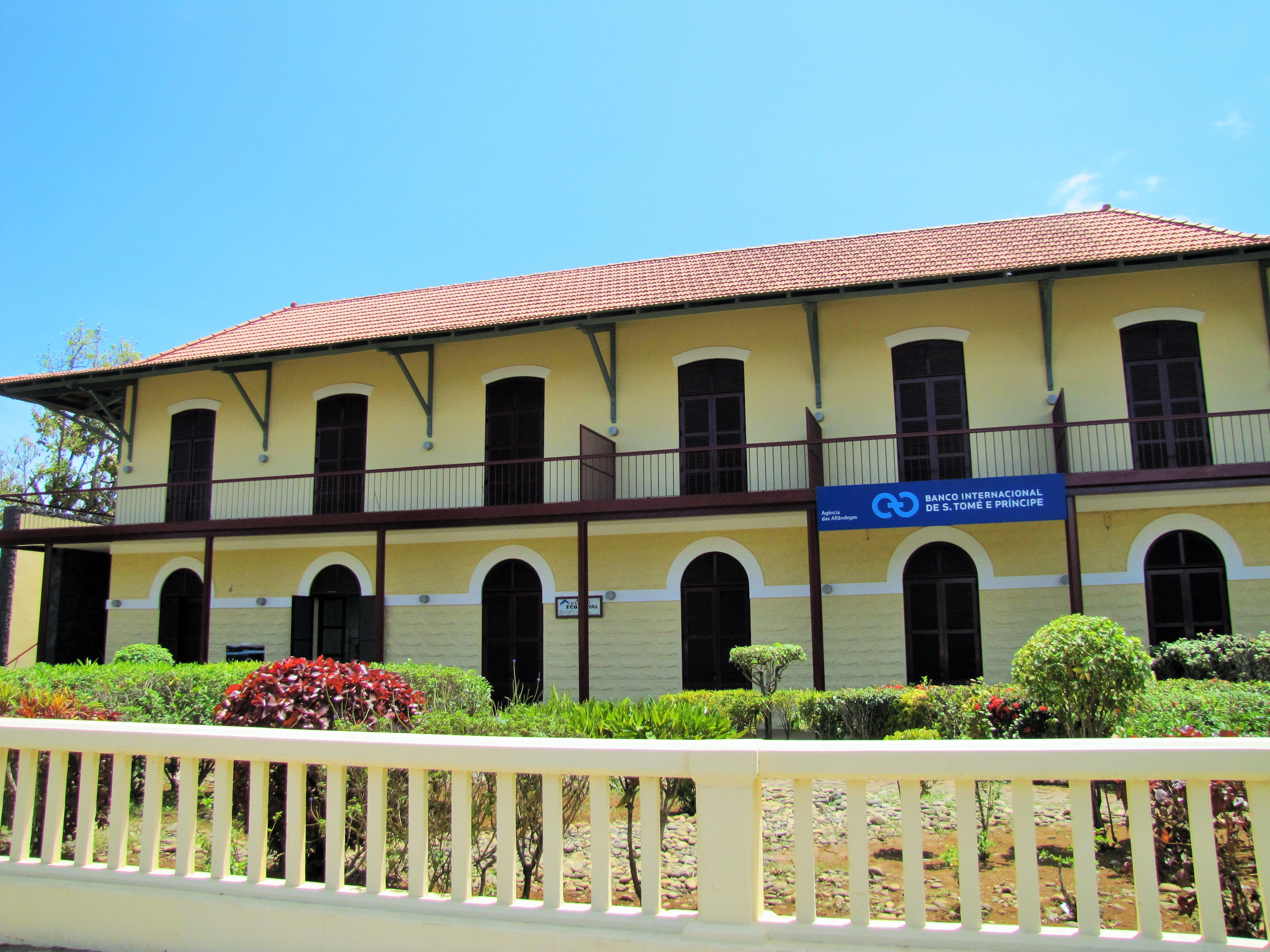
Santa Casa of São Tomé, São Tomé & Príncipe

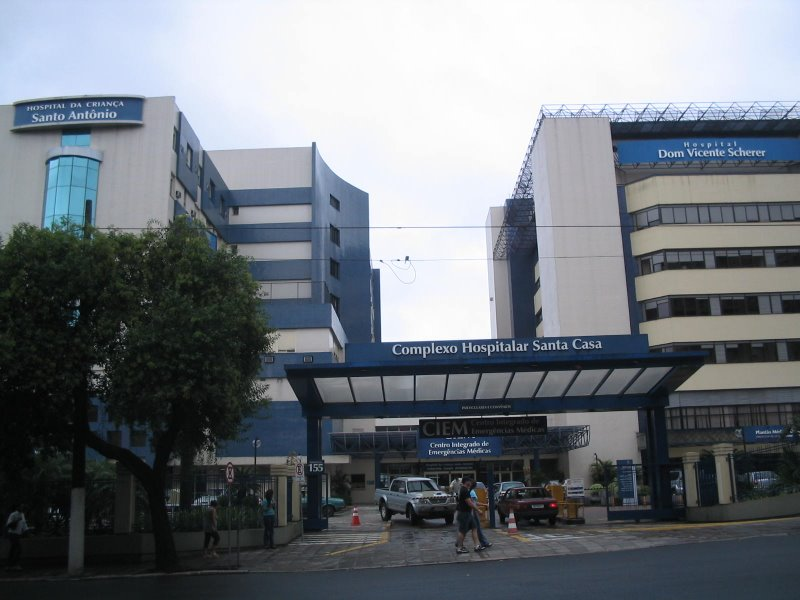
Santa Casa of Porto Alegre, Brazil

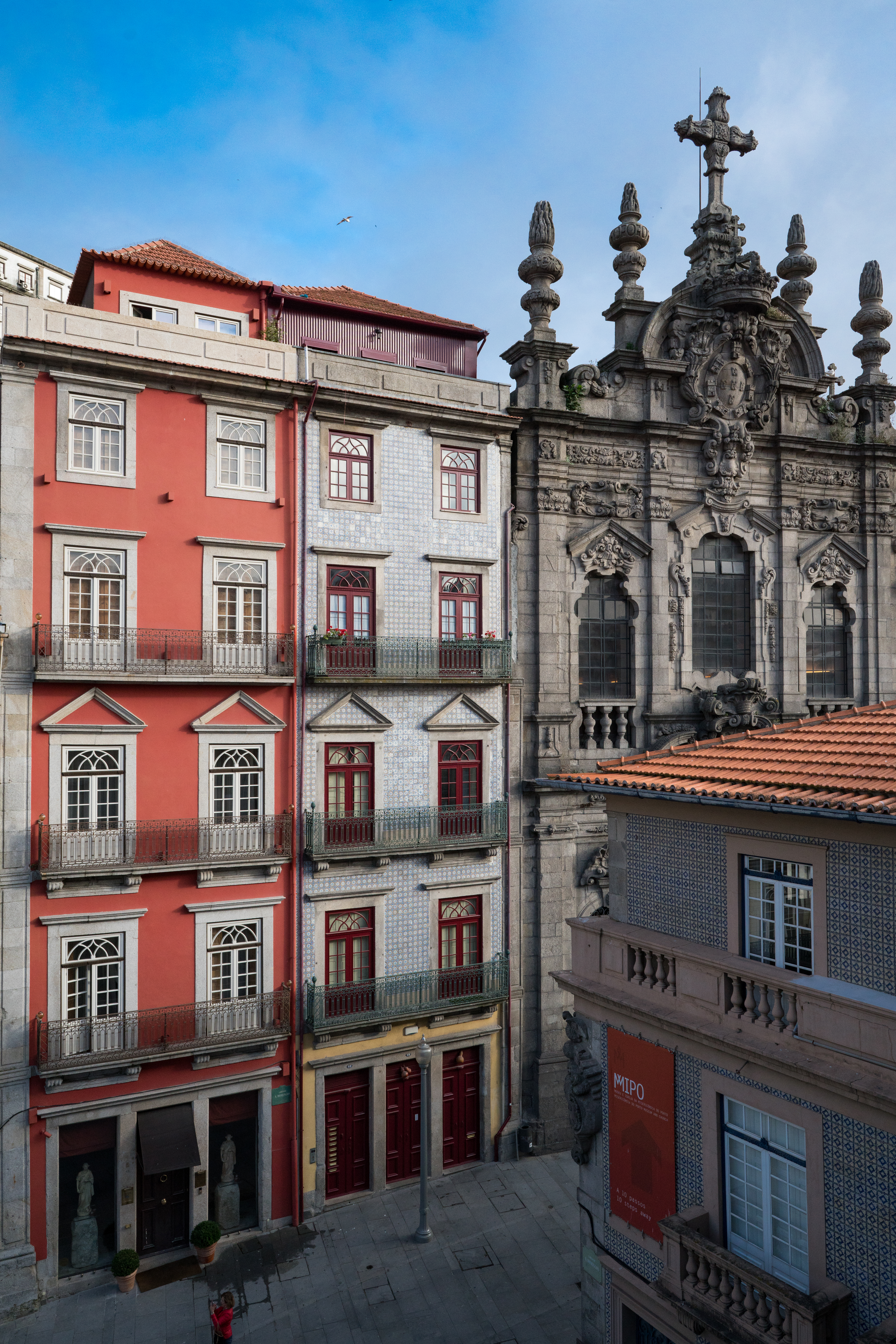
Santa Casa of Porto, Portugal

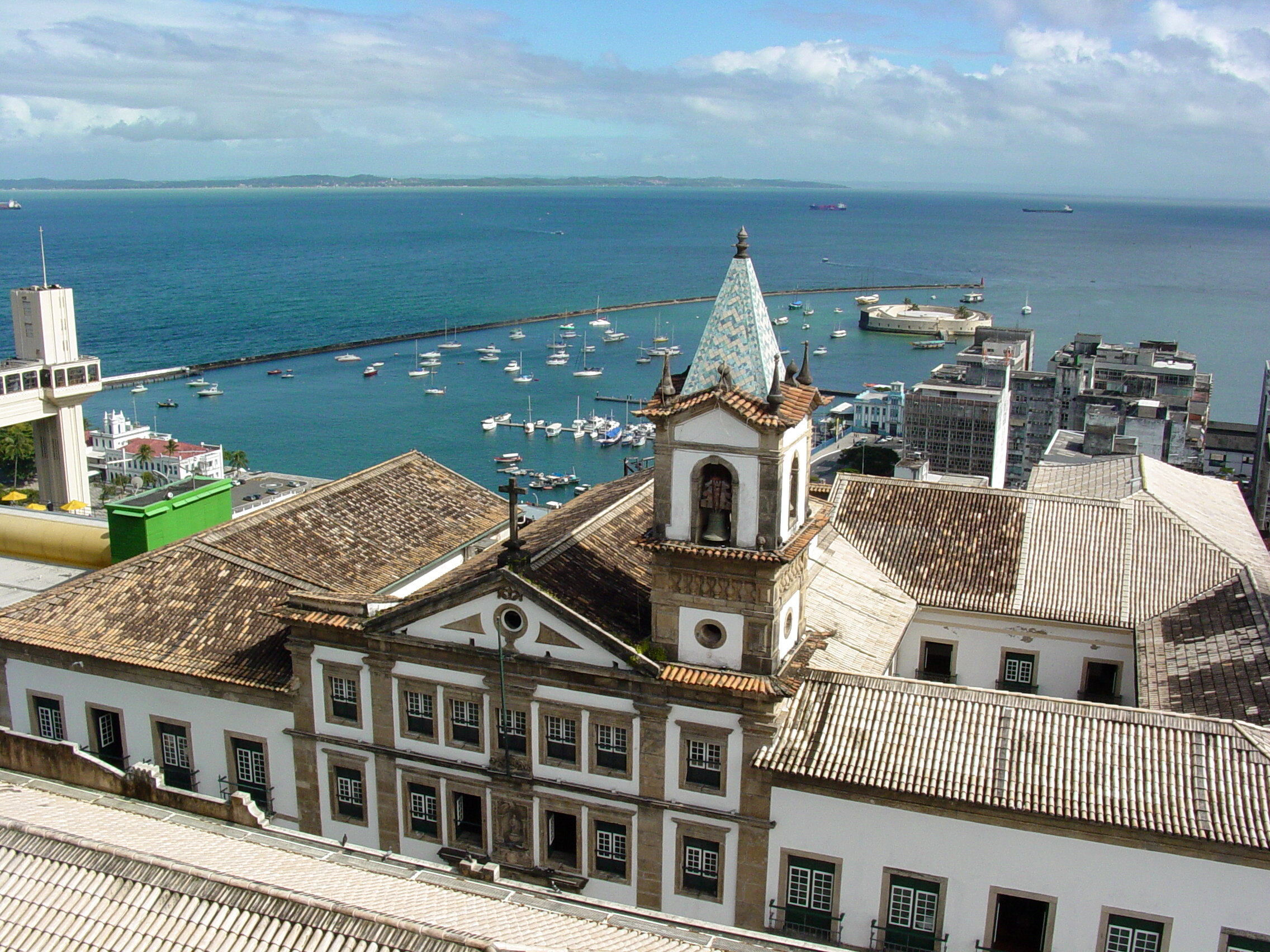
Santa Casa of Salvador, Brazil
- Angola:
  - Santa Casa da Misericórdia de Luanda
  - Santa Casa da Misericórdia de Huambo
- Brazil:
  - Santa Casa da Misericórdia de São Paulo
  - Santa Casa de Misericórdia de Porto Alegre
  - Santa Casa de Misericórdia of Feira de Santana
  - Santa Casa de Misericórdia de Vitória
- Spain:
  - Santa Casa da Misericórdia de Pamplona
  - Santa Casa da Misericórdia de Barcelona
  - Santa Casa da Misericórdia de Bilbao
  - Santa Casa da Misericórdia de Azpeitia
  - Santa Casa da Misericórdia de Olivença (Portugal)
  - Santa Casa da Misericórdia de Ávila
  - Santa Casa da Misericórdia de Alcuéscar (Cáceres)
  - Santa Casa da Misericórdia de Tudela
- France:
  - Santa Casa da Misericórdia de Paris
- Italy:
  - Santa Casa da Misericórdia de Florença
- Luxemburg:
  - Santa Casa da Misericórdia de Luxemburgo
- Macao Special Administrative Region of the People's Republic of China:
  - Santa Casa da Misericórdia de Macau (Chinese: 仁慈堂)
- Mozambique:
  - Santa Casa da Misericórdia de Maputo
- Palestine:
  - Santa Casa da Misericórdia de Belém
- Islands of São Tomé e Príncipe:
  - Santa Casa da Misericórdia de São Tomé e Príncipe
- Ukraine:
  - Santa Casa da Misericórdia de Kiev
