= Retreat and Church of Our Lady of Humility =

Church in Santo Amaro, Brazil

- Recolhimento e Igreja de Nossa Senhora dos Humildes
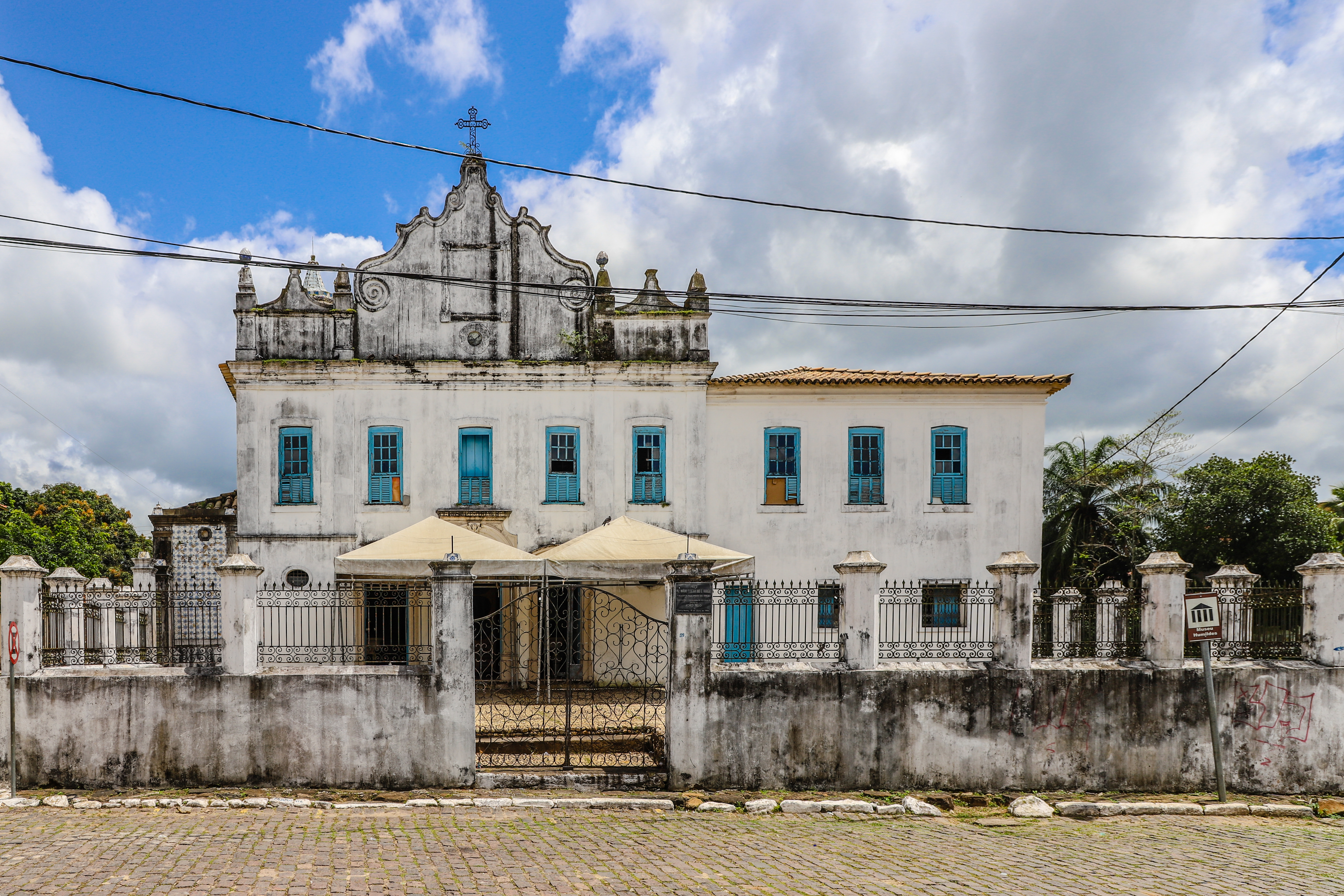
- Façade of the Retreat and Church of Our Lady of Humility, Santo Amaro, Bahia

- Location of the Retreat and Church of Our Lady of Humility in Brazil

Religion
- Affiliation: Catholic
- Rite: Roman
- Ownership: Roman Catholic Archdiocese of São Salvador da Bahia

Location
- Municipality: Santo Amaro
- State: Bahia
- Country: Brazil
- Interactive map of Retreat and Church of Our Lady of Humility
- Coordinates: 12.54914°S 38.70931°W

Architecture
- Style: Baroque, Neo-Classical
- Groundbreaking: 1796

Specifications
- Direction of façade: South
- Interior area: 1,817 square metres (19,560 ft^{2})

The Retreat and Church of Our Lady of Humility (Portuguese: Recolhimento e Igreja de Nossa Senhora dos Humildes, also Igreja e Convento de Nossa Senhora dos Humildes) is a 19th-century Roman Catholic church and women's religious retreat located in Santo Amaro, Bahia, Brazil. It is dedicated to Our Lady of Humility and covers 1,817 square metres (19,560 ft^{2}). The retreat and church consists of an architectural ensemble of a chapel, a retreat, a seminary, parsonage, forecourt, and side garden. It was listed as a historic structure of the State of Bahia by the IPAC in 1986.

== History ==
The Retreat and Church of Our Lady of Humility was one of the few centers of refuge and education for women in Brazil in the colonial period. The retreat, or recolhimento, houses orphans, women contemplating a religious vocation, and nuns, many of whom were widows or abandoned in marriage. The complex was built over a long period from the late 18th century to mid 19th century. It follows the construction in Santo Amaro of the Parish Church of Our Lady of Purification (Igreja Matriz de Nossa Senhora da Purificação) in 1706; the Town Hall and Prison (Casa de Câmara e Cadeia) in 1769; and at the same time as the Church of Our Lady of Protection (Igreja de Nossa Senhora do Amparo).

In total, the complex took approximately eight decades to complete. It was developed without a master plan at its outset, and consists of a mixture of architectural styles and types of building materials. The chapel was the first building on the site. It was built by Inácio dos Santos e Araújo in 1796. Araújo, its founder, became a priest shortly afterwards, and enlarged the structure. Araújo doubled the size of the nave in 1801 to resemble that of larger parish churches in Bahia. Side aisles were added in the same period. The belfry was not moved to the front of the church, and thus sits to the middle of the complex. A father Ignatius was authorized to enlarge the church in 1819 and built the forecourt. He was also responsible for the import of a large number of azulejos from Portugal. They were utilized in the interior of the nave and sacristy. The retreat, or recolhimento, was constructed between 1808 and 1817. It opened on December 8, 1817, with 12 recolhidas, six novices, and nine servants.

Father Bento de Maria Santíssima succeeded the founder of the recolhimento in 1845. He enlarged the complex between 1845 and 1848, adding the chaplain's house, an infirmary, a locutory, and the beginning of a new seminary. Under his direction the ceiling of the nave was elevated in 1856; modifications were made to the façade in line with the expansion of the nave.. Three portals richly framed in lioz stone imported from Portugal were added in this period. The choir was enlarged by removing side walls, and marble was placed in the sacristy. A second floor was added to the retreat. Father Bento de Maria Santíssima also added two gates to the garden. The left lateral corridor was modified with a gallery of neoclassical-style arches in 1870.

The façade, chancel, and chapel were again modified in the early 20th century under Chaplain Joaquim Francisco de Vasconcelos. Tiles and rich door and window frames were removed from the façade in this period, distorting its original appearance. The chapel ceiling was again modified, and talha dourada, or gilded woodwork, was added to central and side altars. The pulpits and two lateral altars were probably removed in this period. The church and retreat complex fell into great disrepair in the 20th century. The Bahia Artistic and Cultural Heritage Foundation, through an agreement with the Brotherhood and the City Hall, began restoration of the complex in 1975. A museum was established to display the rich collection of sacred objects of the retreat.

== Location ==
The Retreat and Church of Our Lady of Humility is located on the right bank of the Subaé River. It forms the eastern edge of the historic center of Santo Amaro, and is connected to the Town Hall of Santo Amaro by numerous small, narrow streets. The complex faces a square that in turns opens to the Subaé. The square is surrounded by numerous single story houses to its right; many are still owned by the convent. The left side of the convent directly overlooks the Subaé.

== Structure ==
The Retreat and Church of Our Lady of Humility is constructed of lime and stone masonry. It has internal pillars of the same materials to support the structures of the complex. The internal walls are of pau a pique and brick. The facade of the building opens to the Subaé River and has a raised church yard, or forecourt, surrounded by an iron railing. The chapel has three portals framed in lioz stone imported from Portugal with five windows at the choir level. An arched gallery is located to the left of the façade. It is now half walled in and covered with semi-industrial tiles. The tower of the chapel is recessed, and only partially visible from the front of the church. A pediment with volutes is at center.

=== Interior ===
The chapel has a narrow nave with side corridors, one now closed and converted into a small chapel. An enclosed transept to the right of the front of the nave opens to a small patio. The retreat is to the right of the nave, with a chapel on the first floor and dormitory rooms on the second floor above the transept. The seminary, often referred to as the new seminary, is a large structure located adjacent to the rear of the chapel and retreat. It is a single-story, square-shaped structure built around a small, open patio. A deposit and veranda are located behind the seminary.

The church has a richly decorated chancel arch with two side altars at front. The chancel, like other churches of Bahia and the Church of Our Lady of Protection in Santo Amaro built in the same period, has a barrel vault with lunettes. The wood ceiling of the nave is flat. It is painted with an image of Mary set within a medallion. The interior is rich with azulejos of the 18th and 19th century, entirely imported from Portugal. Those of the sacristy are in blue and yellow and feature floral motifs. Additional azulejos of the sacristy are in shades of purple and date to the late 18th century. The azulejos of the nave date to the late 19th century. They are in blue and white, with a motif of palms and faint lines. The azulejos under the choir resemble those of the nave, but date to a later period of artistic and manufacturing decline of azulejos in Portugal. The talha dourada, a gilded wood carving, is entirely in the Neoclassical style.

The retreat and church have a rich collection of religious objects and artworks. The statues of Our Lady of the Angels (Nossa Senhora dos Anjos), Saint Miguel, and Saint Rita are attributed by Manoel Querino to Domingos Pereira Balão.

=== Parsonage ===
The parsonage of the retreat and church is located to the side of the church across a narrow street. It is in the style of a Portuguese colonial-era sobrado.

== Protected status ==
The retreat and church were listed as historic structures by the Artistic and Cultural Institute of Bahia (IPAC) in 1986. The complex was recognized not only for its historical and architectural value, but also as an element of the Historic Center of Santo Amaro.

== Access ==
The Retreat and Church of Our Lady of Humility is in poor condition. It is not open to the public and may not be visited.
