= Conceição do Jacuípe =

Municipality of Bahia, Brazil

- Municipality
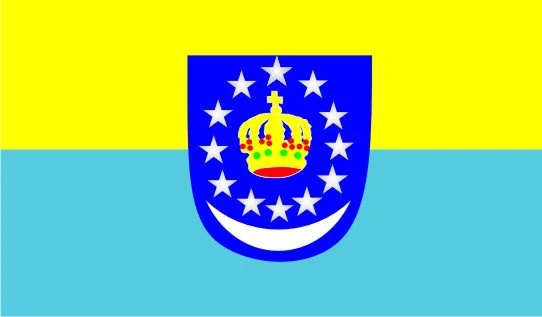
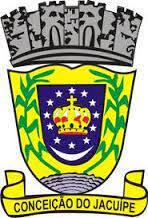
- Flag Coat of arms

- Location in Bahia
- Coordinates: 12°19′37″S 38°45′54″W
- Country: Brazil
- State: Bahia
- Meso-region: Centro Norte Baiano
- Micro-Region: Feira de Santana
- Established: October 20, 1961

Government
  - Mayor: Tânia Marli Ribeiro Yoshida

Area
  - Total: 117.53 km^{2} (45.38 sq mi)
- Elevation: 248 m (814 ft)

Population 2020 (est.)
  - Total: 33,398
  - Density: 284.17/km^{2} (735.99/sq mi)
- Demonym: Conjacuipense
- Time zone: UTC−3 (BRT)
- Area/distance code: (00)55

Conceição do Jacuípe is a municipality in the state of Bahia in the North-East region of Brazil

== Neighboring municipalities ==
- Amélia Rodrigues
- Coração de Maria
- Santo Amaro
- Feira de Santana
- Terra Nova
- Teodoro Sampaio

== See also ==
- List of municipalities in Bahia
