= Ananda Nahu =

Brazilian graffiti artist (born 1985)

- Born: 1985 (age 39–40); Bahia, Brazil
- Education: College of Design / fine arts
- Alma mater: Federal University of Bahia (2004)
- Known for: Graffiti art, murals
- Style: Combines past and modern cultures and people

Ananda Nahu is a Brazilian graffiti artist born in Bahia, Brazil in 1985. In 2001, she moved from Juazeiro to Salvador, where she attended the College of Design in 2003 and the Fine Arts School at the Federal University of Bahia in 2004. Throughout this time, she developed interests in diverse artistic expressions such as photography, Fine Arts Paintings and engravings, as a result of her studies and research on lithography, serigraphy, metal graving, and posters.

Nahu was introduced to the art of graffiti when she met graffiti artist and ex husband, Rodrigo Izolag. As a result, she began using stencils in order to create wall arts. In Nahu's work, which mostly showcases women, utilizes a variety of techniques, colors, visual effects, and painting styles contribute to her vision of, combining past and modern cultures and people into a harmonious compositions that expresses the pure beauty, strength, and positivity from the nature of human beings.

In 2014, Nahu, along with Jeremy Thal, created a "sound and art" installation at the BRIC House Hallway focused on New York's diaspora communities, SOUND WALLS/SOANDO PAREDES. Over the course of multiple years Nahu collaborated with fellow Brazilian artist, Izolag, and Bronx based photographer, Ricky Flores, to create art based on Flores's work which finally culminated in Faces from the Block at the BronxArtSpace in 2015.

Nahu was selected as one of the "redefining" artists of Brazil in 2015 by CNN Style. In 2016 she contributed to a large (600 plus feet long) mural in Cleveland, Ohio. In 2022, Nahu painted a large mural in one of the guest room hallways at the Rosewood hotel in São Paulo.

Nahu currently resides in Rio de Janeiro, Brazil.
