= Creuza Oliveira =

Brazilian trade unionist (born 1957)

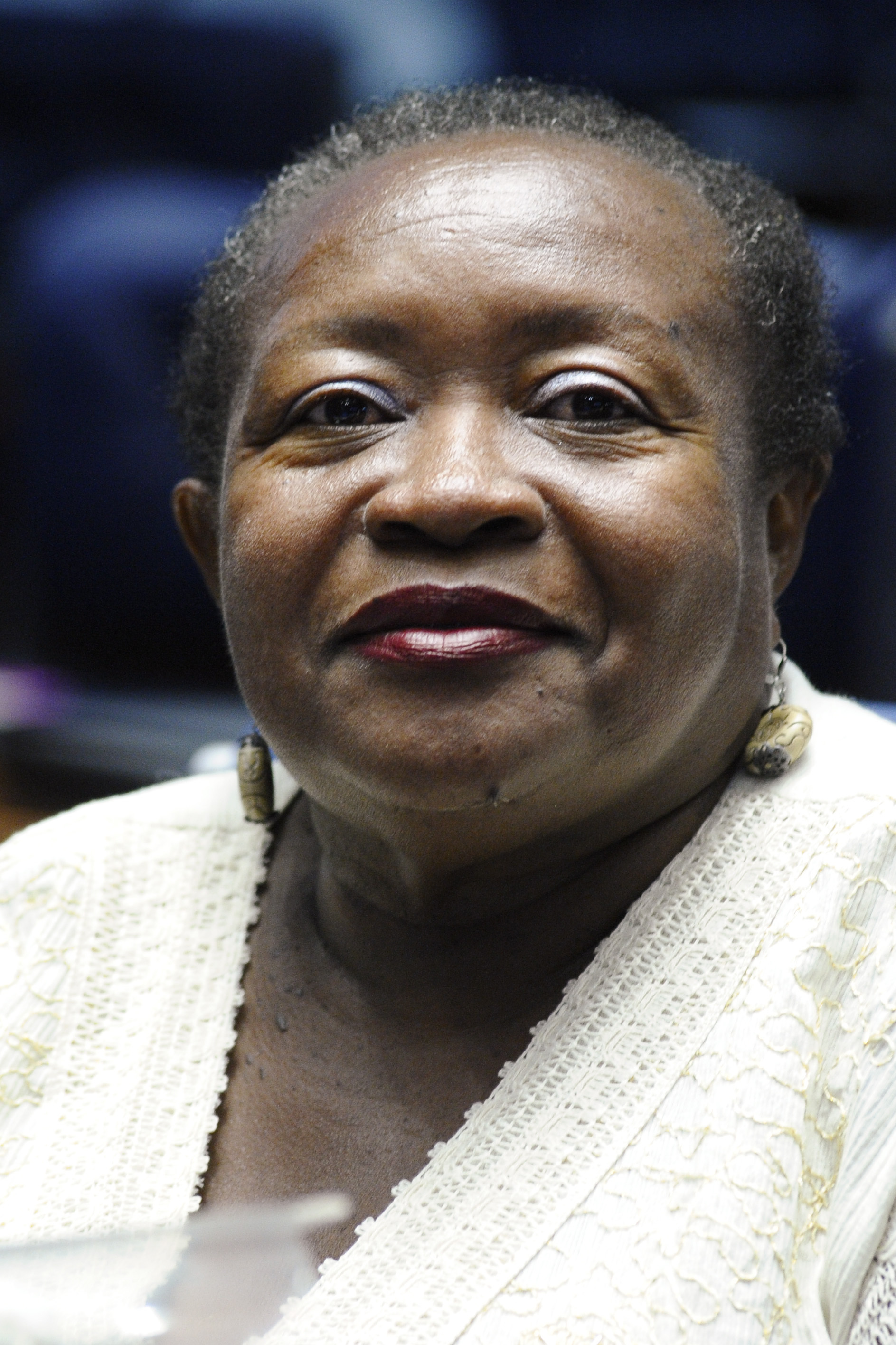
- Oliveira in 2015
- Born: 11 May 1957 (age 69); Santo Amaro, Bahia, Brazil
- Occupations: Human rights activist Trade unionist
- Organization: Federação Nacional das Trabalhadoras Domésticas
- Political party: Brazilian Socialist Party (2014–present); Workers' Party (before 2014)
- Honours: Order of Labour Merit (2005)

Creuza Maria Oliveira CavMT (born 11 May 1957) is a Brazilian trade unionist known for her advocacy for domestic workers in Brazil. After working as a domestic worker from the age of five, during the 1980s she founded the Association of Domestic Workers of Bahia, which later went on to become the Bahia Domestic Workers Union in 1992. After serving as its president for 11 years, Oliveira went on to become the president of the National Federation of Domestic Workers (Fenatrad) from 2003 until 2017, and continues to serve as its honorary president.

== Early life and education ==
Oliveira was born on 11 May 1957 in Santo Amaro, Bahia to Maria do Patrocínio Oliveira and Francisco Araújo, poor rural workers; she has two siblings. When Oliveira was five, her father died, and she was forced to begin working as a domestic servant; she was not paid, and instead received clothes, food and housing in exchange for her work. When Oliveira was 12, her mother died, following which Oliveira became homeless. She subsequently had to drop out of school in order to work full-time. Oliveira began being paid for her work when she was 21.

Oliveira resumed her education at the age of 16, and completed her primary and secondary education by the age of 30 after studying at night school.

== Activism ==
During the 1980s, Oliveira joined the trade unionist movement in order to advocate for the rights of domestic workers. She called for better working conditions, especially for black workers. She became aware of the movement after learning domestic workers were meeting at a school in Salvador. In 1986, she founded the Association of Domestic Workers of Bahia. Domestic workers won the right to form a union in 1988 after the promulgation of the constitution legally recognised domestic service as a profession, and in 1992 she co-founded the Bahia Domestic Workers Union, serving as its president until 2003. During this time, she co-founded the 27 de Abril Housing Complex in Salvador, which was accommodation specifically for domestic workers.

In 2003, Oliveira was elected president of the National Federation of Domestic Workers (Portuguese: Federação Nacional das Trabalhadoras Domésticas, Fenatrad), advocating for domestic workers nationally and internationally. She remained in post until 2017. She was involved in the enactment of laws that protected the rights of domestic workers, including a constitutional amendment that granted greater rights, no. 72, which granted minimum wage, bonus, weekly rest, paid holidays, maternity leave, retirement, and access to social security. Oliveira campaigned for the Quota Law (2012), which allowed the children of domestic workers, as well as indigenous and black people, to enter university. After leaving her post at Fenatrad, she continued to serve as its honorary president.

In June 2011, Oliveira was part of the Brazilian delegation to the General Conference of the International Labour Organisation in Geneva, Switzerland, where she participated in the drafting of the Convention on Domestic Workers.

In 2008 and 2012, she was elected to Salvador's city council as a member of the Workers' Party. In 2014, Oliveira ran as a federal deputy candidate for the Brazilian Socialist Party. She ultimately was not elected. In 2020, she publicly supported Dani Ferreira, a student activist from the Workers' Party, for a seat on the city council of Salvador.

== Recognition ==
Oliveira has twice won the human rights award from the federal government's Secretaria de Direitos Humanos, in 2003 for her campaigning against child labour, and in 2011 for her calls for racial equality.

In 2005, Oliveira received the Order of Labour Merit from the President of Brazil, Luiz Inácio Lula da Silva. That same year, she was nominated for the Nobel Peace Prize as part of the PeaceWomen Across the Globe initiative.

In November 2023, Oliveira received an honorary doctorate from the Federal University of Bahia, becoming the first union leader to receive one.

The International Domestic Workers Federation described Oliveira as someone who helped domestic workers be seen as "producers of knowledge" rather than "an object of study for the academic field".
