= Jaqueline Goés de Jesus =

Brazilian scientist (born 1990)

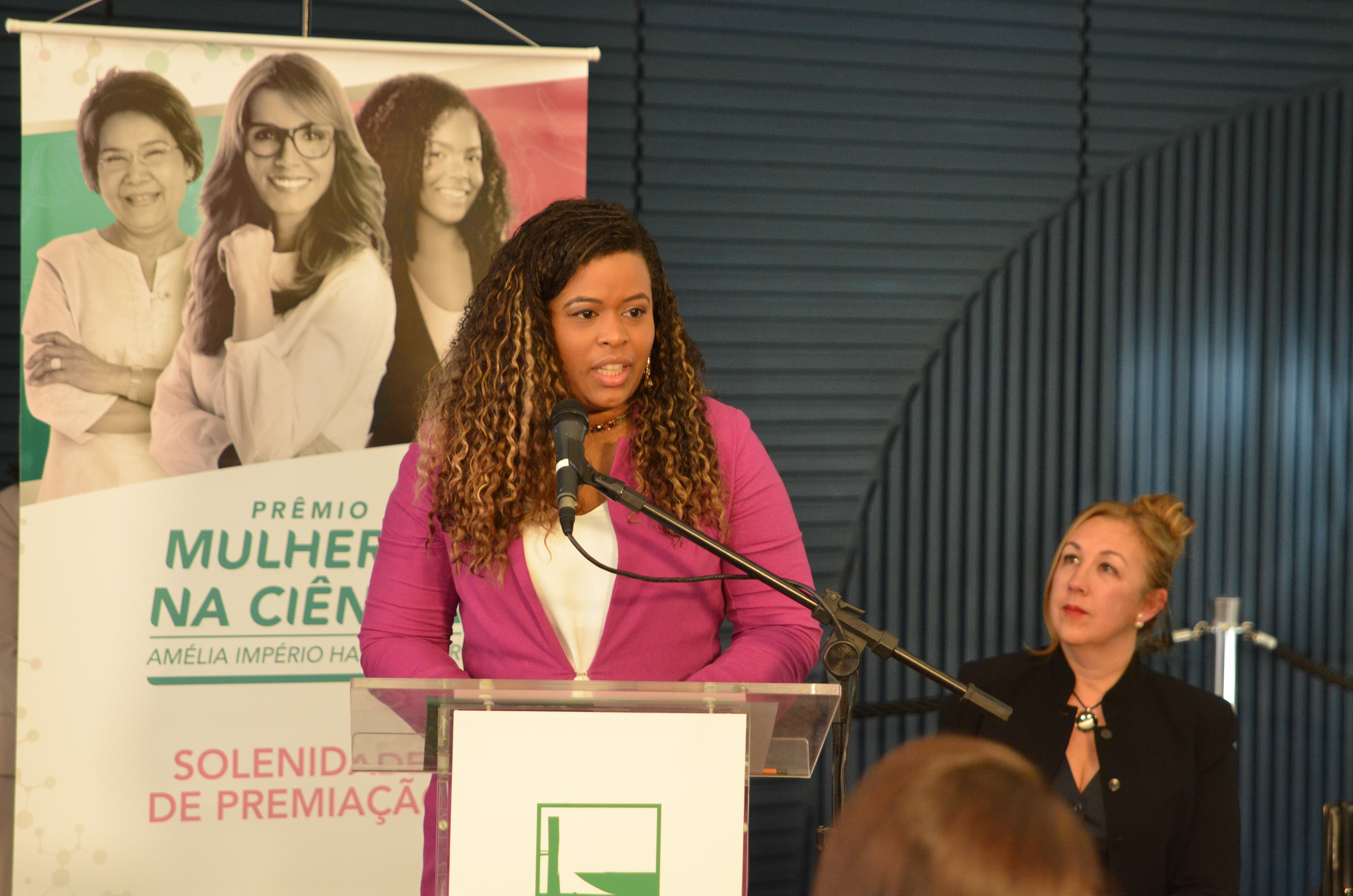
- Jaqueline Goes in 2022
- Education: Escola Bahiana de Medicina e Saúde Pública; Federal University of Bahia
- Scientific career
- Workplaces: University of São Paulo

Jaqueline Góes de Jesus (born 1990) is a Brazilian scientist and researcher. She was part of the team which sequenced the Zika virus. During the COVID-19 pandemic, she was a member of the team responsible for sequencing the first genome of the SARS-CoV-2 virus in Brazil.

== Early life and education ==
Góes de Jesus is from Salvador in Northeast Brazil. Her mother is a nursing technician and her father is a civil engineer. She was a teenager when she decided to work in biomedical sciences. Her first research project involved investigations into HIV, which inspired her to pursue a career in global public health. She studied biomedicine at the Escola Bahiana de Medicina e Saúde Pública. Góes de Jesus moved to the Instituto Gonçalo Moniz for her graduate studies, earning a master's degree in biotechnology. Subsequently, Góes de Jesus completed a doctoral degree at the Federal University of Bahia, specialising in human and experimental pathology. During her doctoral research, she visited the laboratory of Nick Loman at the University of Birmingham, where she was trained in nanopore sequencing.

== Research and career ==
After earning her doctoral degree Góes de Jesus joined the University of São Paulo Institute of Tropical Medicine as a São Paulo Research Foundation (FAPESP) research fellow. She started working on the ZIBRA (Zika in Brazil Real Time Analysis) project, which sought to understand the spread of zika virus in Brazil. The ZIBRA project developed and implemented mobile Zika virus genomic sequencing, and travelled across six public health laboratories in the northeast Brazil aiming to sequence 750 genomes.

Góes de Jesus subsequently sequenced dengue virus genomes outbreak from Brazil. The majority of infections occurred in São Paulo state, and Góes de Jesus focussed her study on two municipalities: (São José do Rio Preto and Araraquara). A large team of researchers identified that the strain of dengue virus during the 2019 outbreak was most similar to viruses found in Martinique and Guadeloupe. Góes de Jesus is a member of the United Kingdom–Brazil Centre for Arbovirus Discovery, Diagnosis, Genomics and Epidemiology, Diagnosis, Genomics and Epidemiology (CADDE), an epidemics monitoring project that seeks to understand the circulation of arbovirus in Brazil and its persistence in non-epidemic periods.

Alongside her academic work, Góes de Jesus is a science communicator, with a following of over 160,000 people on Instagram.

=== COVID-19 pandemic ===
During the COVID-19 pandemic, Góes de Jesus worked with Ester Cerdeira Sabino and Nuno Faria to sequence the first genomes of SARS-CoV-2 from Latin America. After receiving samples from the first infected Brazilian patient on February 26, the team sequenced and analyzed the genome in 48 hours. Their efforts made it possible to differentiate the version of SARS-CoV-2 that was infecting people in Brazil from the one that first emerged in Wuhan in January 2020.

The team found that the version of SARS-CoV-2 which infected the first Brazilian patient was more akin to Italian strains, whereas the second form was closer to strains from the United Kingdom. In March 2020 the team's success was recognised by Legislative Assembly of Bahia. Pastor Isidório Filho emphasised the importance of their work. On March 6, Maurício de Sousa Produções turned Jesus and Ester Cerdeira Sabino into characters in the Turma da Mônica series.
