= Santa Casa de Misericórdia of Santo Amaro =

- Santa Casa de Misericórdia de Santo Amaro
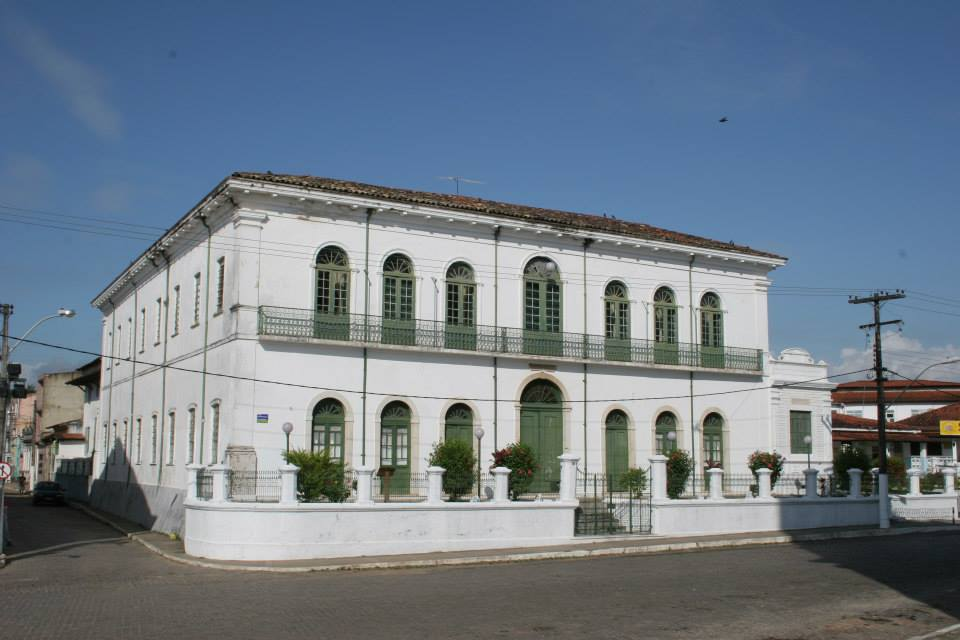
- Santa Casa de Misericórdia de Santo Amaro, Bahia, Brazil

- Location within Brazil

General information
- Type: philanthropic organization and hospital
- Location: Santo Amaro, Bahia, Brazil
- Coordinates: 12°32′50″S 38°42′39.5″W
- Completed: 1778

Technical details
- Floor count: 2
- Floor area: 1,347 square metres (14,500 ft^{2})

National Historic Heritage of Brazil
- Designated: 1941
- Reference no.: 287

The Santa Casa de Misericórdia of Santo Amaro (Portuguese: Santa Casa de Misericórdia de Santo Amaro) is an 18th-century philanthropic and medical building in Santo Amaro, Bahia, Brazil. The building was completed in 1778, following the construction of the Parish Church of Our Lady of Purification (completed ca. 1727) and the Town Hall of Santo Amaro (1769). The Santa Casa de Misericórdia of Santo Amaro faces the Parish Church of Our Lady of Purification in the Historic Center of Santo Amaro. The building contains the Hospital Nossa Senhora da Natividade and still functions as a hospital in Santo Amaro.

== Structure ==
It has two stories, and covers 1,347 square metres (14,500 ft^{2}). The structure was developed around a courtyard to facilitate illumination and air circulation. This feature was common to large public buildings of the period, notably the Asilo Santa Isabela in Salvador and later in the Agricultural School of São Bento das Lages (Escola Agrícola de São Bentodas Lages) in São Francisco do Conde.

== Protected status ==
The Santa Casa de Misericórdia of Santo Amaro was listed as a historic structure by the National Institute of Historic and Artistic Heritage in 1941 under inscription number 287.
