= Jeremiah Spence =

American professor

Jeremiah P. Spence
- Born: Texas
- Occupation: Professor

Academic background
- Education: University of Texas
- Thesis: Exploring Trends in Brazilian Television Consumption: A Quantitative Study of Major Urban Centers from 2004 to 2014 and A Case Study of Two Rural Communities in the Amazonian Region (2015)

Academic work
- Discipline: Media & Communication
- Institutions: Erasmus University

Jeremiah P. Spence is a visiting professor at the University of Texas, Austin. He was an assistant professor at Erasmus University, Rotterdam, Netherlands. He taught Global and International Communication in the Erasmus School of History, Culture and Communication. He is a visiting researcher at Federal University of Bahia, University of São Paulo, and Federal University of Rio Grande do Sul.

In 2015, he completed his Ph.D. from the University of Texas in Communication and Media Studies with the dissertation titled Exploring Trends in Brazilian Television Consumption: A Quantitative Study of Major Urban Centers from 2004 to 2014 and A Case Study of Two Rural Communities in the Amazonian Region. Spence is the founding editor of Journal of Virtual Worlds Research.

== Published works ==
- (as co-editor, with Joseph Straubhaar, Zeynep Tufekci, and Roberta G. Lentz) Inequity in the Technopolis: Race, Class, Gender, and the Digital Divide in Austin (University of Texas Press, 2012)
- (as co-author, with Joseph D. Straubhaar, Vanessa Higgins Joyce, and Liza Duarte) The Evolution of Television: An Analysis of 10 Years of TGI Latin America (2004-2014) (CreateSpace Independent Publishing Platform, 2015)
- (as co-author, with Joseph D. Straubhaar) Telecommunications in The Routledge Handbook to the Culture and Media of the Americas (Routledge, 2020)
- (as co-author, with Stuart Davis, Martha Fuentes Batista, Joseph D. Straubhaar) The Social Shaping of the Brazilian Internet in The Routledge Companion to Global Internet Histories (Routledge, 2019)
- (as co-author, with Joseph Straubhaar, Laura Dixon, and Viviana Rojas) Latino and Asian as Pan‐Ethnic Layers of Identity and Media Use Among Second‐Generation Immigrants in The Handbook of Diasporas, Media, and Culture (Routledge, 2019)
- (as co-author, with Joseph Straubhaar, Fabio Ferrera) Comparando Iniciativas Govermentais e não-Govermentais de Inclusao Digital nos Estados Unidos e no Brasil in Cidades contemporaneas e políticas de informação e comunicações (Edufba, 2007)
- NGOs and Government: the Social Shaping of Internet from Below in Informacao e comunicacao (Edufba, 2004)
