= Parish Church of Our Lady of Purification =

Church in Santo Amaro, Brazil

- Igreja Matriz de Nossa Senhora da Purificação
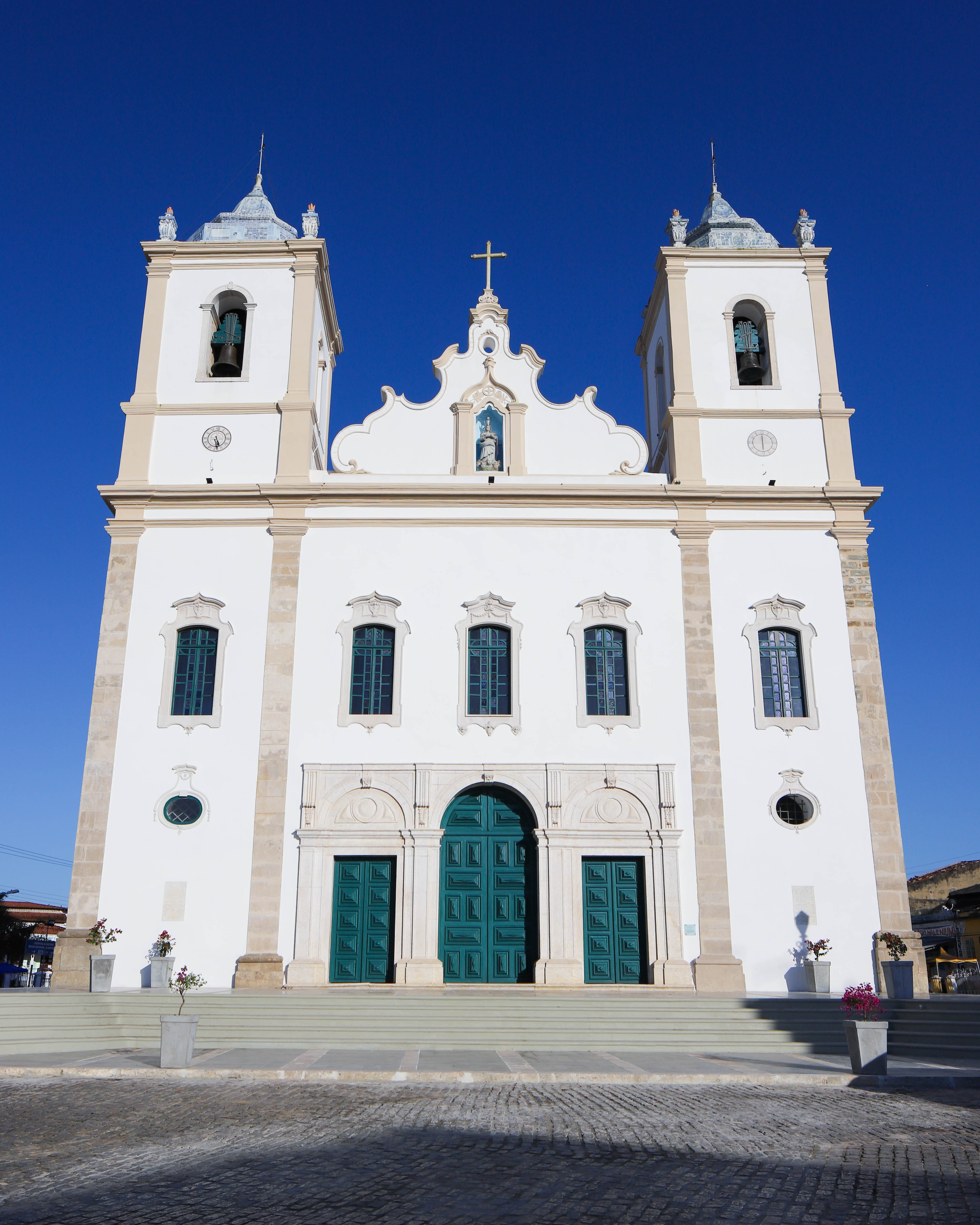
- Parish Church of Our Lady of Purification, Santo Amaro, Bahia

- Location of the Parish Church of Our Lady of Purification in Brazil

Religion
- Affiliation: Catholic
- Rite: Roman
- Ownership: Roman Catholic Diocese of Cruz das Almas

Location
- Municipality: Santo Amaro
- State: Bahia
- Country: Brazil
- Coordinates: 12.54683°S 38.71058°W

Architecture
- Style: Baroque, Neo-Classical
- Groundbreaking: 1706

Specifications
- Direction of façade: South-East
- Interior area: 1,817 square metres (19,560 ft^{2})

National Historic Heritage of Brazil
- Designated: 1941
- Reference no.: 282

The Parish Church of Our Lady of Purification (Portuguese: Igreja Matriz de Nossa Senhora da Purificação) is an 18th-century Roman Catholic church located in Santo Amaro, Bahia, Brazil. The church is dedicated to Blessed Virgin Mary and belongs to the Roman Catholic Diocese of Cruz das Almas. Its construction is dated to 1706. The church was listed as a historic structure by the National Historic and Artistic Heritage Institute in 1958.

== History ==
The first Parish Church of Our Lady of Purification was built in the 17th century. It was a simple church of mud and straw construction built by the Franciscans in the 17th century; its first mass is dated to October 18, 1700, the celebration day of Saint Lucas. Construction of the present structure began in 1706. José de Barros, vicar of the church, described the state of construction of the church in 1727. The Parish Church was fully walled and plastered by 1727. The tribunes, which originally rested on arches, were walled in. The Portuguese Crown donated 6,000 cruzados for the construction of the retable in 1729. An inspection of the church in 1730 revealed that the roof, ceilings, carvings, and altarpiece were in poor condition.

By 1757 the chancel was increased by 27 palmos, or approximately 7.5 metres (25 ft). The size of the church by this period was compared to the Parish Church of Saint Bartholomew in Maragogipe. The architecture style of the church reflects its long period of construction, ranging from the Baroque of the early 18th century to the Neoclassical of the late 18th century.

A crack, three fingers wide, was found in one of the bell towers in 1828, but was not considered serious. The first repairs of the church were carried out in 1921. Plaques on the frontispiece of the church indicate that the exterior and chancel were repaired between 1925 and 1926.

== Location ==
The Parish Church of Our Lady of Purification is located at the north-western end of the Praça da Purificação, a public square. It sits a block above the Subaé River opposite the Town Hall of Santo Amaro. Several 19th-century buildings were built around the church, including the House at Rua da Matriz, no. 9 (Sobrado à Rua da Purificação, nº 9), located nearly in front of the church; and the Santa Casa de Misericórdia of Santo Amaro, located along the south (left) of the building.

== Structure ==
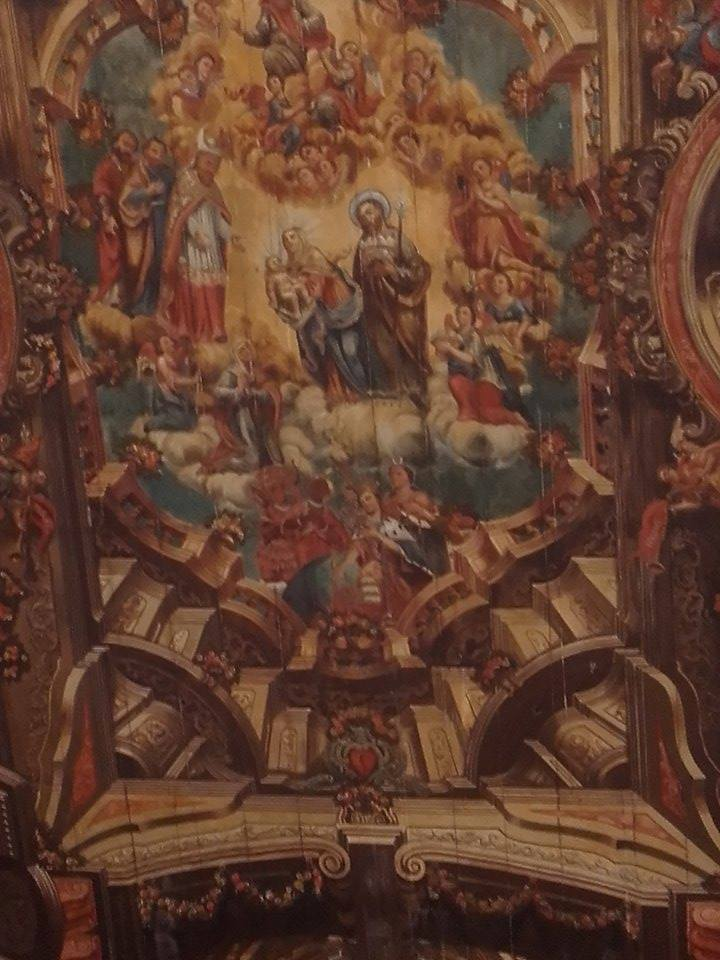
Painting of the nave ceiling

The Parish Church of Our Lady of Purification is constructed of lime and stone masonry. The church covers 1,817 square metres (19,560 ft^{2}), is 29 metres (95 ft) high, and has two stories. The façade has three portals, a monumental pediment, and is flanked by bell towers on both sides. The church was once surrounded by an iron railing, but now has a broad, circular staircase that surrounds the front and sides of the building. The portals are in lioz limestone imported from Portugal in the style of a triumphal arch, similar to that found in the parish church in Maragogipe. Three windows at the choir level, with two windows at the same level in the bell towers. The windows of the bell tower have oculi below. The pediment has volutes and central niche with an image of Our Lady of Purification.

The bell towers have small clocks blow the bell gable, a feature also found in the bell towers of the Church and Convent of Saint Antony and Chapel of the Third Order in São Francisco do Conde. The belfries have pyramid pediments covered by blue and white azulejos, a feature found in other churches in Salvador and the Recôncavo region. The bell tower pediments are surrounded by four ceramic flame urns, also with blue tiles. The gabled roof is supported by wood supports.

=== Interior ===
The first floor consists of a single nave with a transept. The church has an elaborate chancel and altar, and side altars. It has two sacristies at the rear of the first church, with one now used as a meeting room. The nave is spacious, with a large-scale vaulted, painted ceiling of wood. There are additional paintings along the walls of the nave and above the side altars, and numerous azulejos. The paintings of the ceilings of the transept have Biblical scenes.

The second story has a choir above the entrance, lateral tribunes, and consistories above the sacristies on the first floor. One lateral corridor was transformed into side chapels. The choir is supported by two smooth marble columns. A stone arch under the choir opens to a bapistery with a stone font. One arch at the front left of the nave provides access to the sacristy, and that of the right to the Chapel of the Holy Sacrament. The chapel has a skylight. The church has a rich collection of images, statues, and sacred implements.

The painting of the ceiling of the vaulted nave is of oil on wood. The painting is 2,600 centimetres (1,000 in) long, 1,200 centimetres (470 in) wide, and has a height of 250 centimetres (98 in). The center of the painting has a large image of the Holy Family in a stylized medallion.

== Protected status ==
The Parish Church of Our Lady of Purification was listed as a historic structure by the National Institute of Historic and Artistic Heritage in 1958. Both the structure and its contents were included in the IPHAN directive under inscription number 574.

== Access ==
The Parish Church of Our Lady of Purification is open to the public and may be visited.
