= Cypriano Barbosa Bettâmio =

Brazilian physician (1818–1855)

- Born: March 3, 1818; Salvador, Bahia, Brazil
- Died: 1855 (aged 36–37)
- Medical career
- Profession: Physician

Cypriano Barbosa Bettâmio (1818–1855) was a Brazilian medical doctor who died volunteering to lead efforts in fighting the cholera epidemic in the state of Bahia in 1855.

== Early years ==
Bettâmio was born in Salvador, Bahia, March 3, 1818, to Jerônimo Barbosa and Cristódia Maria Pires. He attended the Faculty of Medicine of Bahia, receiving his diploma as a medical doctor in 1847. He then established a small clinic, where he tended to the local population.

== Cholera epidemic ==
In 1855, a cholera epidemic broke out in Salvador and in nearby Santo Amaro da Purificação, eventually killing approximately 50,000 people. A widespread flight of people, fearing for their lives, included medical personnel and public officials. Doctor Bettâmio noted the public panic and told his wife and children goodbye with the expression “Felismina, até a volta, se não for torta!” and took charge of efforts in fighting the epidemic. He tended to the sick and led efforts to remove and bury the dead, until he too eventually caught the disease and died.

== Aftermath ==
Because of his valiant efforts, Bettâmio's widow was awarded a pension by the Emperor of Brazil.

== Note ==
Cypriano Barbosa Bettâmio is also known as Cipriano Barboza Betâmio and Cipriano Betâmio.
