= Eliana Calmon =

Brazilian judge (born 1944)

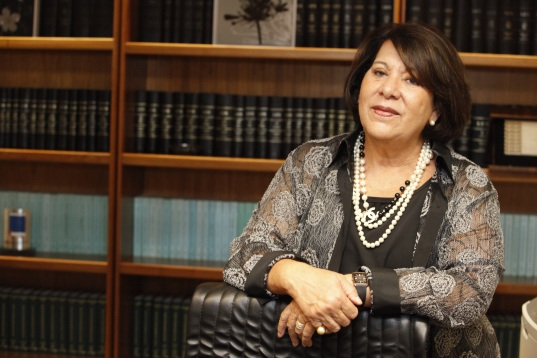
- Calmon in 2013
- Born: Eliana Calmon Alves; 5 November 1944 (age 81); Salvador, Bahia, Brazil
- Occupation: Superior Court judge
- Spouse: Renato Sá Bernardo da Cunha (divorced)
- Children: 1

Eliana Calmon Alves (born 5 November 1944) is a Brazilian jurist and magistrate. She was the first woman to be a member of Brazil's Superior Court of Justice, a position she held from 1999 to 2013. She is also known as the author of a cookbook.

== Early life ==
Calmon was born on 5 November 1944 in Salvador, Bahia. Her parents were Almiro Petronilho Alves and Elisabete Calmon Alves. At the age of 23 she married Renato Sá Bernardo da Cunha. They had one son before separating. Calmon graduated in law from the Federal University of Bahia (UFBA) in 1968 and completed a specialization in Civil Procedure in 1982 at the same institution. In 1974, she was approved through public examination for the position of Attorney of the Republic for the Brazilian state of Pernambuco. In 1976, she was promoted to be Deputy Attorney General. After a public examination in 1979, Calmon became a federal judge. She served on the Regional Electoral Court of the state of Bahia between 1983 and 1984, being promoted to the Federal Regional Court in 1989.

== Superior Court of Justice ==
On 30 June 1999, Calmon became a minister of the Superior Court of Justice, becoming the first woman to hold a post in this court. In her 14 years in the court, she issued over 100,000 judgements. Between September 2010 and September 2012, she served as Inspector General of Justice of the National Council of Justice (CNJ). Her tenure was not without controversy: on one occasion she stated that there were "robbers in robes" in the judiciary. She initiated several investigations into judges' assets to clarify accusations of corruption. During this period, the Federal Supreme Court (STF) interfered, granting several injunctions against her investigations. The then president of the STF, Cezar Peluso, even criticized her publicly. However, several groups of magistrates, political entities and sectors of civil society supported her. Another controversy during her time at the CNJ was the investigation of evidence of irregularities in the São Paulo Court of Justice (TJSP), which generated protests from magistrates.

While Calmon was at CNJ, the programme known as Justiça Aberta (Open Justice) was introduced. This required judges to register with details about their assets, etc. She initiated special courts in several Brazilian airports, to serve passengers requiring quick decisions. Another novelty was the "Pai Presente" project, which allowed children with legally unrecognized paternity to have their parents' names added to their records. Close to 23,000 children were helped in this way. Calmon also took steps to improve the preparation of judges. In conjunction with the National Secretary for Drug Policy (SENAD) and the Office of Institutional Security (GSI), the CNJ provided training for magistrates on drug policy. In 2010 and 2011, 15,000 magistrates and civil servants were trained.

Calmon was a regular lecturer to postgraduate courses promoted by the Brazilian Institute of Procedural Law (IBDP), the Federal Justice Council (CJF) and the Brazilian Institute for Research and Integrated Studies (IBPEI), especially in the areas of enforcement and tax law. She was a professor of Civil Law at the Faculty of Law of the Unified Teaching Association of the Federal District (AEUDF) and at the Catholic University of Salvador. She was the general director of the National School of Training and Improvement of Magistrates.

Calmon runs an advocacy and law company.

== Politics ==
After retiring from the Supreme Court of Justice, in the 2014 elections Calmon was a candidate of the Brazilian Socialist Party (PSB) for the Brazilian Senate, to represent Bahia. She received 502,928 votes, but was not elected. In 2018, she joined the Sustainability Network party (REDE), but left in the same year to support Jair Bolsonaro in the presidential elections.

== Honours and awards ==
- Calmon is an honorary citizen of Paraíba and Sergipe states. She is also an honorary citizen of the cities of Macapá and São Carlos.
- In 2010, she received the Maria Quitéria Commendation, from the City of Salvador.
- In 2010 she was also honoured by the Brazilian Association of Women in Legal Careers for her services to the rights of citizens.
- In 2009, the Chamber of Deputies awarded her the Medal of Legislative Merit.
- In 2008, she was awarded the Order of Judiciary Merit by the Court of Justice of the Federal District and Territories (TJDFT).
- In 2006, she was elected Woman of the Year by the International Women's Club of Bahia.
- Forbes magazine called her the most influential woman in Brazil in the legal sector in 2005.

== Publications ==
Calmon is co-author with Uadi Lammêgo Bulos of Direito Processual: Inovações e Perspectivas (Procedural Law: Innovations and Perspectives). The volume discusses several themes such as the reform of the Brazilian Civil Procedure Code and external control of the judiciary. She also contributes articles on legal topics to several specialized magazines and to Brazilian newspapers.

Calmon is also known for her interest in gastronomy. In 2002 she published REsp-Receitas Especiais (Special Recipes), which has had nine editions. The title is a play on the name of the procedural institute of Special Appeal (Recurso Especial - REsp), which is one of the main resources under the jurisdiction of the Superior Court of Justice. All the money raised from the sale of her cookbooks is allocated to social works.
