= The War of the Saints =

1988 novel by Jorge Amado

- First edition
- Author: Jorge Amado
- Original title: O Sumiço da Santa
- Translator: Gregory Rabassa
- Language: Portuguese
- Publisher: Editora Record
- Publication date: 1988
- Publication place: Brazil
- English publication date: 1993 (Serpent’s Tail); 1995 (Dial Press, paperback)
- Media type: Book
- Pages: 368
- ISBN: 978-1852423728

The War of the Saints (Portuguese: O Sumiço da Santa) is a Brazilian Modernist novel by Jorge Amado first published in 1988. An English translation by Gregory Rabassa appeared in 1993.

== The novel ==
The novel, which takes place within a period of 48 hours, centers around Dom Maximiliano von Gruden, Director of the Museum of Sacred Art in Salvador, Bahia in Brazil. Von Gruden curates a show of Bahian religious art, the centerpiece of which is planned to be a statue of Saint Barbara of the Thunder, reluctantly loaned by the church of Santo Amaro da Purificação in the Bahian town of Santo Amaro. However, as the sloop on which it is being transported docks in Salvador, the statue gets up and walks off the ship. Chaotic efforts to find her come to nothing. Santa Barbara, or her Yoruban spirit entity, Yansan, has her own agenda, freeing a young girl from the nunnery where she has been confined by her aunt. The events over the two days often confuse fact and myth, with Brazilian celebrities of the period, such as the singer Caetano Veloso, forming part of the narrative.

The early pages of the book introduce the main elements that are used throughout the story: magical realism, politics, Brazilian sexuality, and a love of the culture of Bahia, in particular Afro-Brazilian religious ceremony. Emphasis is given to religious syncretism and social critique. The book is also a bitter attack on the regimes that governed Brazil, of censorship, and the banning of political parties and any form of protest. At the same time the book uses a common Amado theme, that of the joy of sexuality, in a "tale of Catholicism subverted by spiritualism, of puritanism undone by joyous sap, of right-wing control undone by happy anarchy".
