= House at Rua da Matriz, no. 9 =

- Casa à Rua da Matriz, n. 9
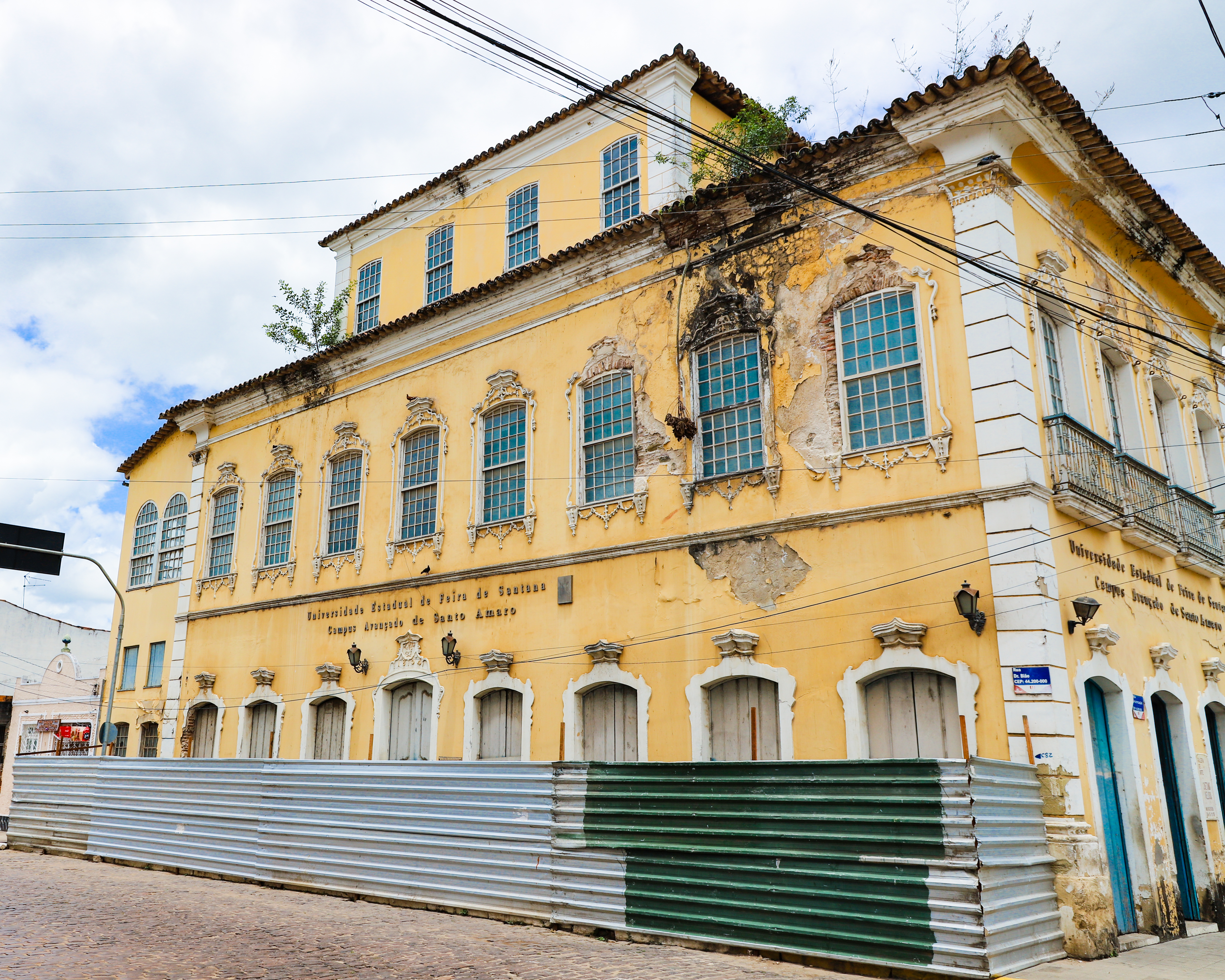
- House at Rua da Matriz, no. 9, Caetité, Bahia

- Location within Brazil
- Alternative names: Sobrado à Praça da Purificação, nº 9, Sobrado de Bijú

General information
- Location: House at Rua da Matriz, no. 9, Santo Amaro, Bahia, Brazil
- Coordinates: 12.5471°S 38.709846°W

Technical details
- Floor count: 3

National Historic Heritage of Brazil
- Designated: 1943
- Reference no.: 286

The House at Rua da Matriz, no. 9 (Portuguese: Casa da Praça Rodrigues Lima, nº 105) is a historic residence in Santo Amaro, Bahia, Brazil. It is also known as the House at the Praça da Purificação, 9 (Portuguese: Sobrado à Praça da Purificação, 9) or Sobrado de Bijú. It is an urban sobrado, or manor house, of the 19th century. Like other Bahian urban sobrados and convents of the period, it has a belvedere. It is located within the Historic Center of Santo Amaro, and is one of many historic structures surrounding the Praça da Matriz. The house is located on the square and looks out towards Parish Church of Our Lady of Purification. It now functions as the State University of Santo Amaro, Campus Avançado de Santo Amaro. It was listed as a historic structure by the National Institute of Historic and Artistic Heritage in 1943.

== History ==
The inscription on the door of the house indicates 1804 as the likely year of construction. Francisco Lourenço de Araújo (1816-1893), the Baron of Sergy and a figure in the Paraguayan War, was born in the house in 1816. The judge Joaquim José Pinheiro de Vasconcellos (1788-1884) and Antonio José Duarte de Araújo Gondim (1782-1826), General Ombudsman of Bahia, met with Miguel Calmon du Pin e Almeida (1796-1865) and others to discuss the Brazilian position on independence at the Lisbon Court. Otávio de Castro Simões and Luciano Martins de Castro Simões sold the house in 1946 to Asclepíades Moreira de Castro. It later became the property of the State University of Santo Amaro.

== Structure ==
The House at Rua da Matriz, no. 9 is a two-story residence with mixed masonry walls and internal brick pillars that support the floors and roof. It has a trapezoidal plan with central circulation. The windows have lintels in a depressed arch with borders finely worked in mortar, in the style of Dona Maria I. The interior is well preserved. The stairway railings, door, and window frames remain. The original building was later attached to a building that culminates in a wide glazed veranda.

== Protected status ==
The House at Rua da Matriz, no. 9 was listed as a historic structure by the National Institute of Historic and Artistic Heritage (IPHAN) in 1943 under inscription number 286. IPHAN carried out general repairs to the house in 1956 and 1974/1975.

== Access ==
The House at Rua da Matriz, no. 9 is not open to the public and may not be visited.
