= Santo Amaro, Bahia =

Santo Amaro
- Municipality
- Municipality of Santo Amaro
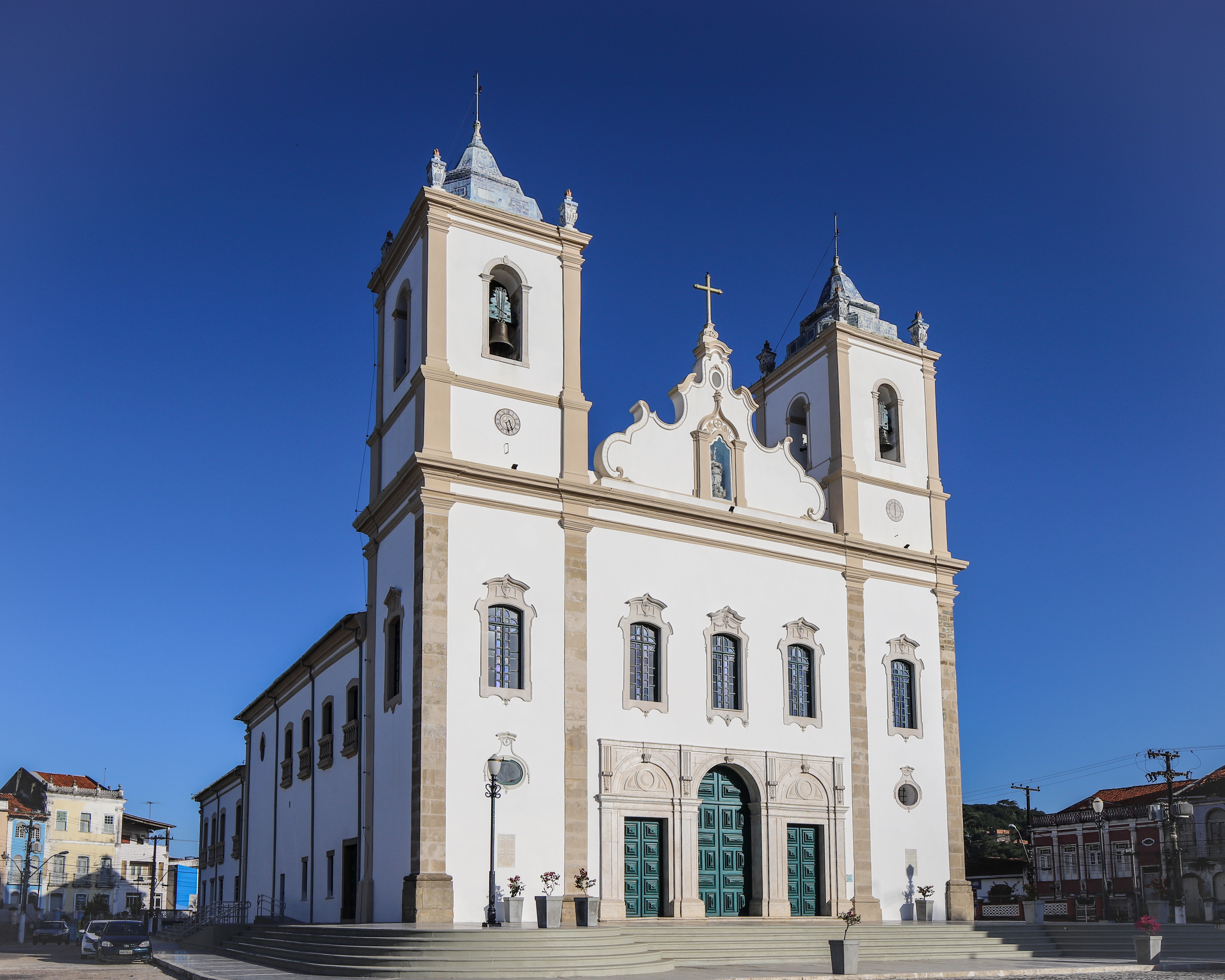
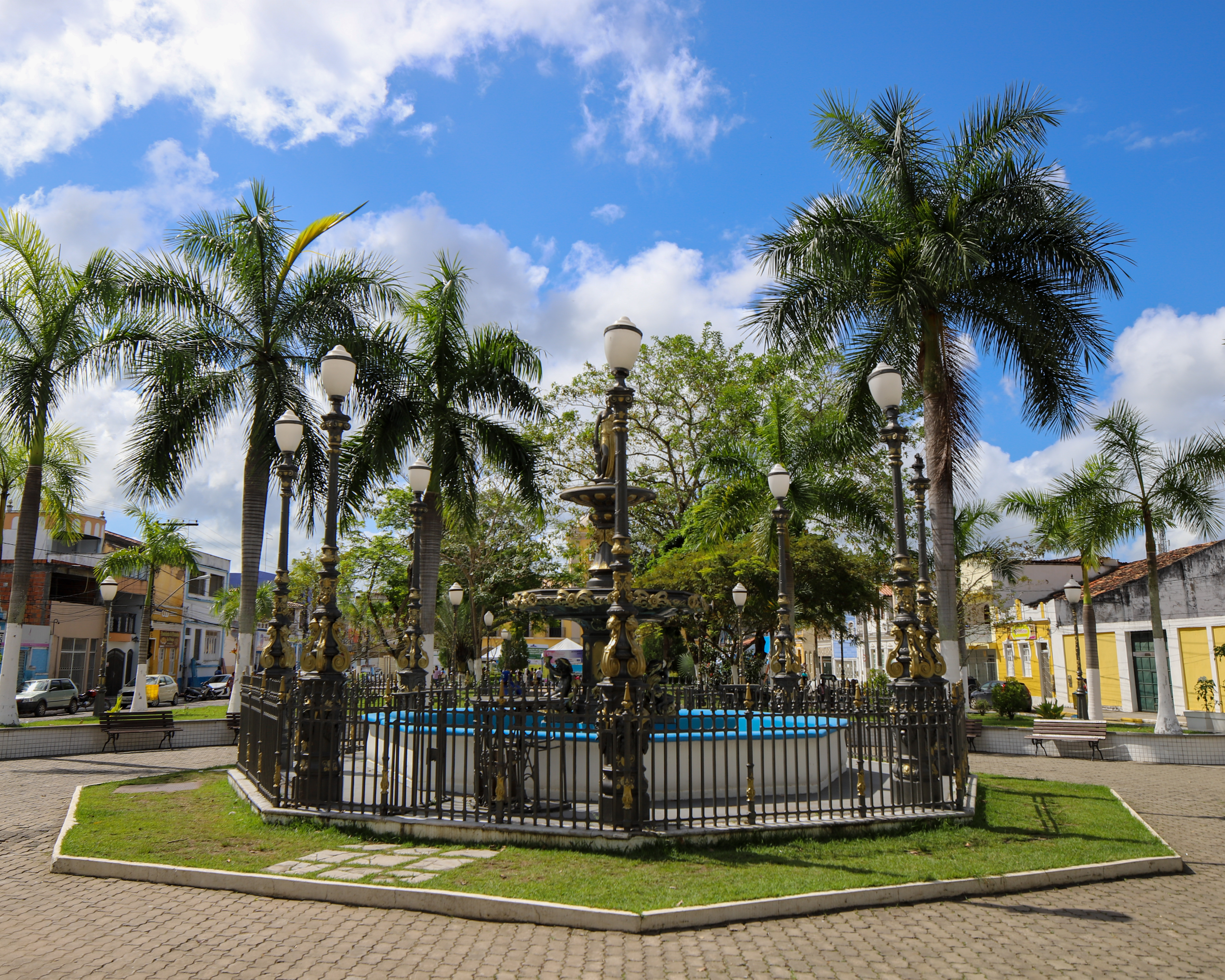
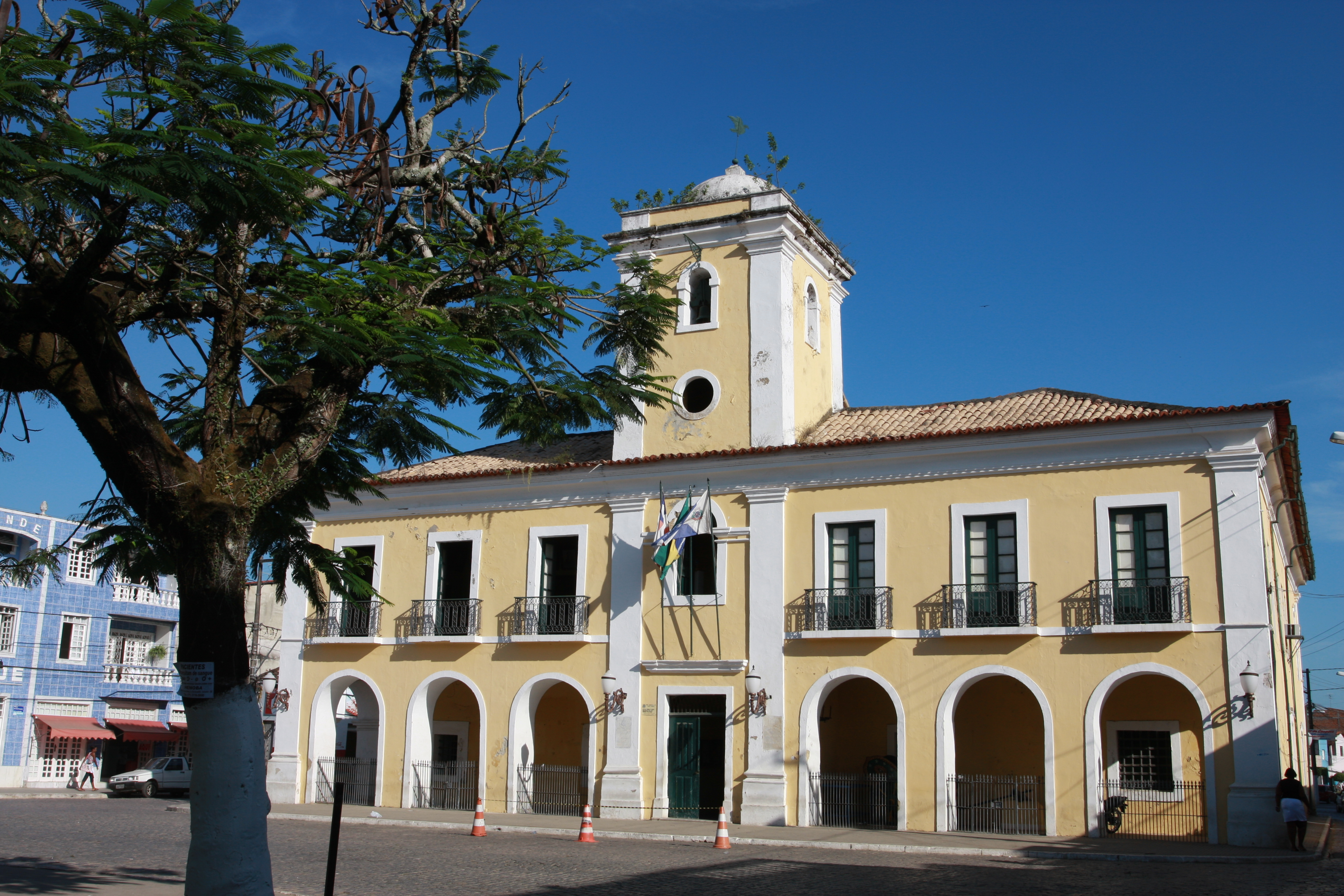
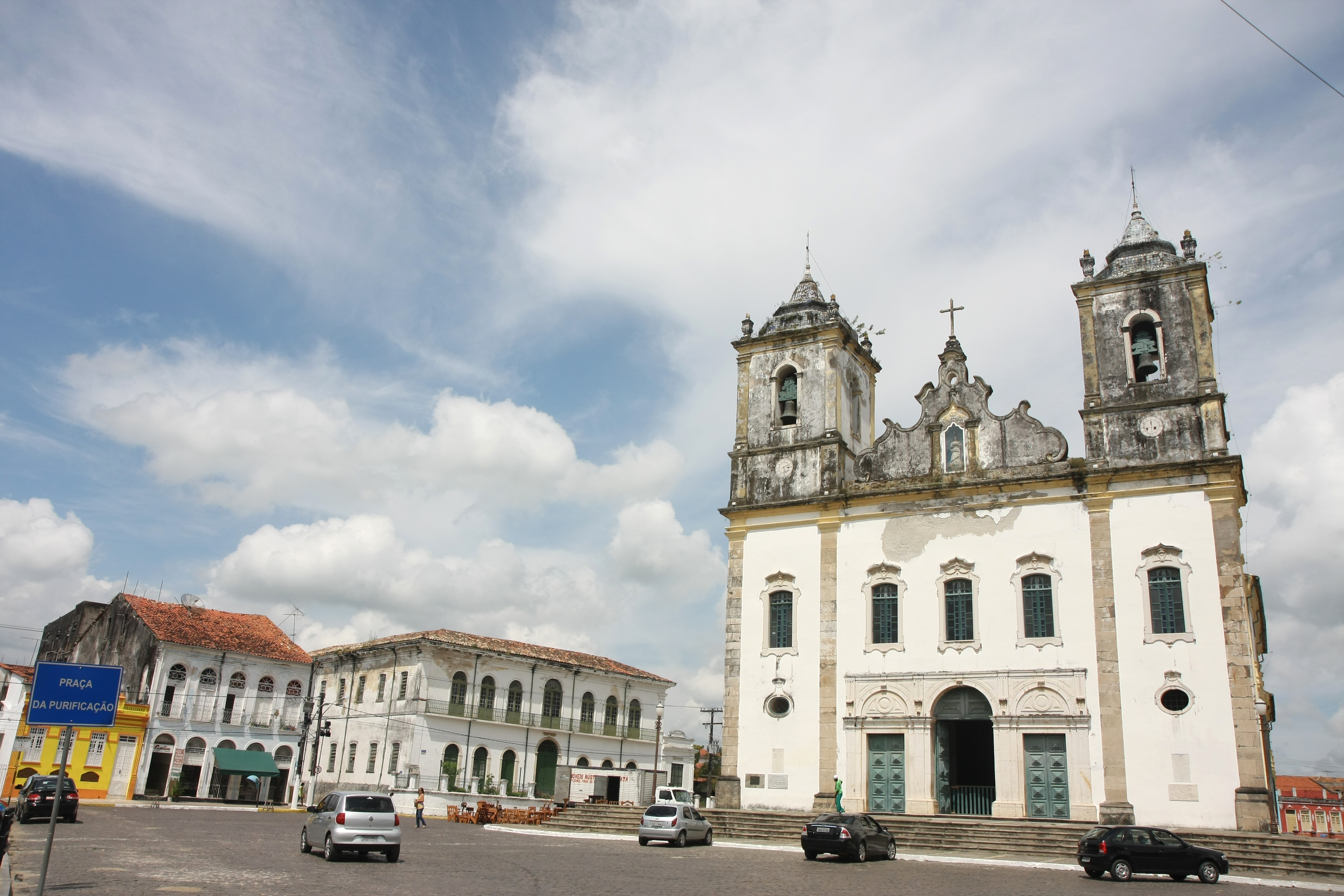
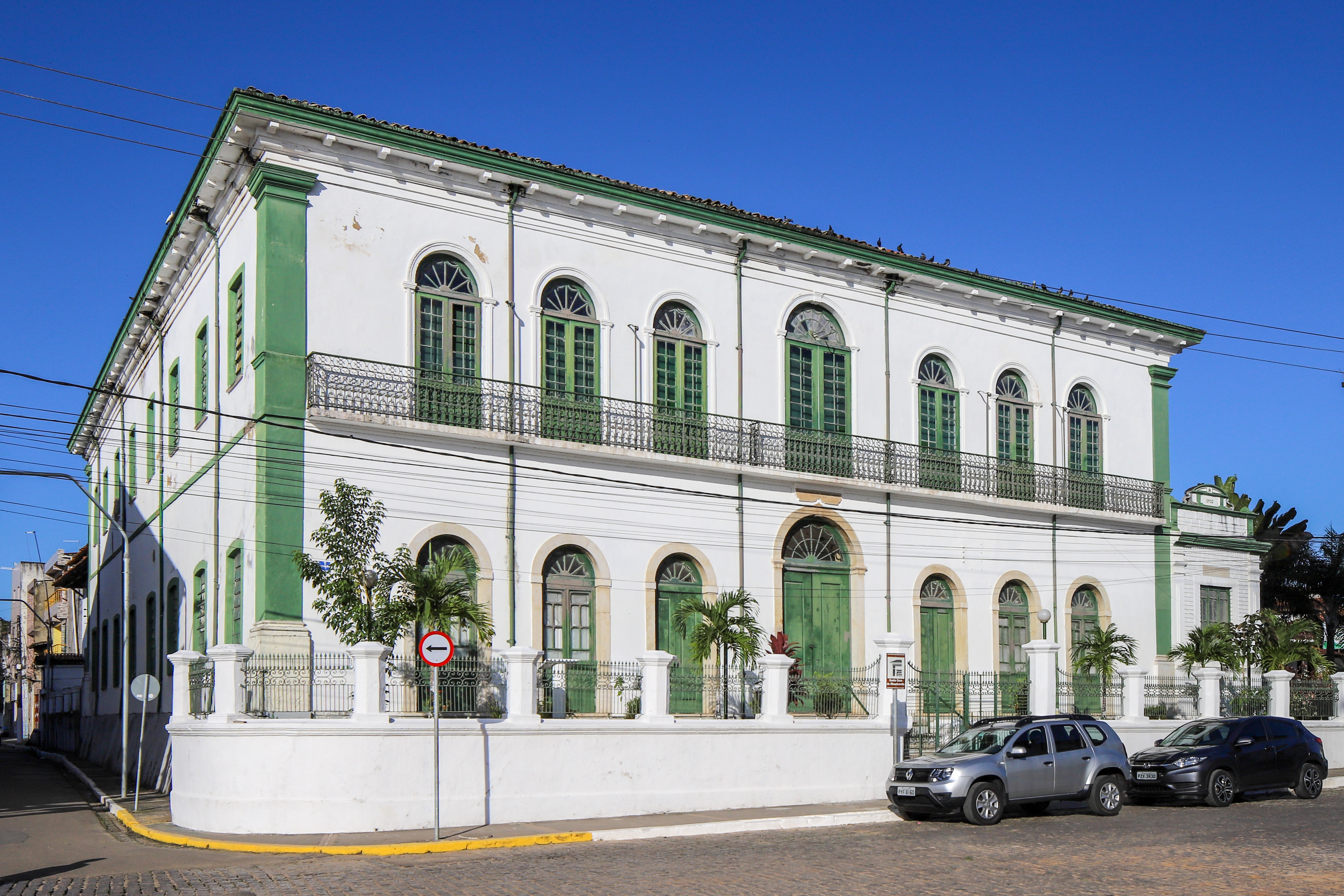
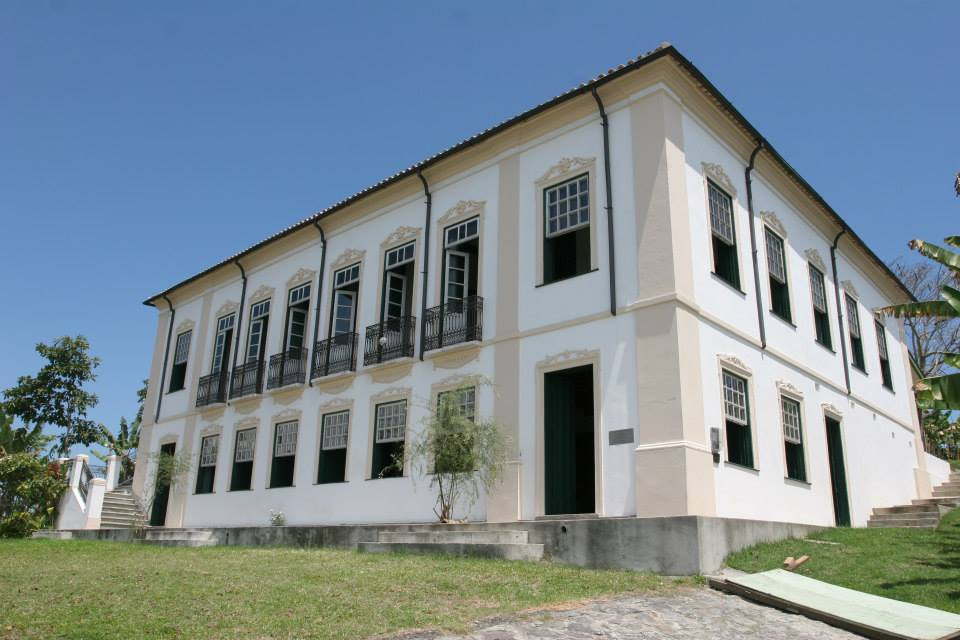

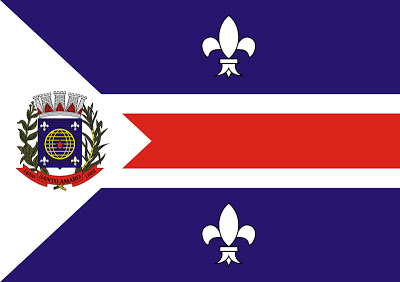
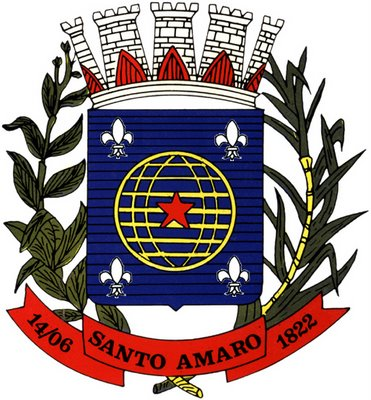
- Flag Coat of arms

- Location in Bahia
- Coordinates: 12°32′49″S 38°42′43″W
- Country: Brazil
- Region: Northeast
- State: Bahia
- Mesoregion: Metropolitana de Salvador
- Founded: 1557

Government
  - Mayor: Alessandra Gomes (PSD)

Area
  - Total: 492.9 km^{2} (190.3 sq mi)

Population (2020)
  - Total: 60,131
  - Density: 122.0/km^{2} (316.0/sq mi)
- Time zone: UTC−3 (BRT)
- HDI (2010): 0.646 – medium

Santo Amaro, also known as Santo Amaro da Purificação (Portuguese pronunciation: [ˈsɐ̃twɐˈmaɾu dɐ puɾifikaˈsɐ̃w]), is a municipality in the state of Bahia in Brazil. The population is 60,131 (2020 est.) in an area of 492.9 square kilometres (190.3 mi^{2}). It is located in the metropolitan area of Salvador. Santo Amaro is located approximately 73 kilometres (45 mi) from the city of Salvador. Santo Amaro was home to numerous indigenous peoples until the arrival of the Portuguese, who developed the region for sugarcane production. Santo Amaro is now noted for its numerous historic structures. The city is also a center of Candomblé, having more than 60 terreiros, or temples of the religion.

== History ==
Santo Amaro was home to Caeté, Pitiguaras, and Carijós peoples prior to the Portuguese colonization of Brazil. The region became an early center of sugarcane production under the Portuguese, with settlements primarily along the Subaé River. It, along with Cachoeira and Nazaré, became early regional urban and economic centers of the Recôncavo region. Santo Amaro was part of the municipality of São Francisco do Conde until 1727.

The city has numerous historic structures as a result of its colonial past, most notably the Parish Church of Our Lady of Purification (Igreja Matriz Santo Amaro da Purificação). Other historic structures include the remains of the mansions of former sugar barons and a municipal palace built in 1769. The area is noted for its nearby beaches, the Falls of Vitória, and the grotto of Bom Jesus dos Pobres. The town features prominently in the novel The War of the Saints by Jorge Amado.

=== Epidemic of 1855 ===
A cholera epidemic occurred in 1855, killing approximately 50,000 in Santo Amaro and in Salvador. Half of the population of Santo Amaro was lost. Doctor Cypriano Barbosa Bettâmio died leading efforts to combat the disease.

== Geography ==
Santo Amaro covers 492.9 square kilometres (190.3 mi^{2}) and borders the municipalities of Conceição do Jacuípe, Amélia Rodrigues, Feira de Santana, São Sebastião do Passé, São Francisco do Conde, Saubara, Cachoeira, and São Gonçalo dos Campos.

=== Subaé River ===
The Subaé River runs through much of the municipality to the Bay of All Saints. Scientists discovered large-scale lead, cadmium, and zinc pollution in the river in 1975, caused by industrial output from a factory owned by the Brazilian Lead Company (Cobrac). The factory operated from 1960 to 1993, but high levels of lead exposure remain among many segments of the population of the municipality.

== Religion ==
According to the Brazilian Census of 2010, Santo Amaro is 77% Roman Catholic, 22% Evangelical, and 1% Spiritist. The statistics do not take into account Candomblé practitioners. Santo Amaro has both a large number of Candomblé terreiros (60) and a long tradition of religious syncretism between Candomblé and Roman Catholicism.

== Historic structures ==
Santo Amaro is home to numerous colonial-period historic structures, many designated as Brazilian national and Bahian state monuments.

- Church of Our Lady of Protection (Igreja de Nossa Senhora do Amparo)
- Parish Church of Our Lady of Purification (Igreja Matriz de Nossa Senhora da Purificação)
- Retreat and Church of Our Lady of Humility (Recolhimento e Igreja de Nossa Senhora dos Humildes)
- Town Hall and Prison (Casa de Câmara e Cadeia)
- Santa Casa de Misericórdia of Santo Amaro
- Igreja de Nossa Senhora de Oliveira dos Campinhos
- Solar do Conde de Subaé
- Solar Paraíso
- House at Rua da Matriz, no. 9 (Sobrado à Rua da Purificação, nº 9)
- Bembé do Mercado

== Notable residents ==
- Siblings Caetano Veloso (1942-) and Maria Bethânia (1946-), both singers and songwriters, were born in Santo Amaro and lived there until moving to Rio de Janeiro at the ages of 13 and 17 respectively.
- Trade unionist Creuza Oliveira (1957–) was born in Santo Amaro.
