= Ana Rita Santiago =

Brazilian academic and author

- Born: Santo Antonio de Jesus, Bahia, Brazil
- Occupations: literature professor, writer
- Employer: Federal University of Recôncavo da Bahia (UFRB)
- Known for: studies of African and Afro-Brazilian writers

Ana Rita Santiago is a Brazilian retired associate professor at the Federal University of Recôncavo da Bahia (UFRB) and professor for the cultural criticism postgraduate programme, at Bahia State University (UNEB). Concentrating her research on literature by black women in Brazil she served as the president of the Association of Black Researchers of Bahia. Following her retirement from university, in 2023 she joined the Brazilian federal Ministry of Human Rights and Citizenship as general coordinator in the Sistema Nacional de Promoção da Igualdade Racial (National System for the Promotion of Racial Equality – SINAPIR).

== Early life and training ==
Santiago was born in Santo Antonio de Jesus, in the eastern part of the state of Bahia, daughter of a single mother who worked in the tobacco industry to support her family. She had three sisters and was known by the family nickname of Rê. She recalled being the only child on her street who could read and the only one of her daughters her mother would allow out of the house at night so that she could attend and read at church meetings. Leaving high school at the age of 17 she worked for ten years before entering the Catholic University of Salvador on a night course. She followed this by studying at the Federal University of Bahia (UFBA) in Salvador, Bahia, with a thesis on the novel, Jubiabá, by Jorge Amado, and then moved to UNEB, where she completed a master's degree in education and contemporary studies with research on the educational project of the Asantewaa Quilombo, an organization that she had founded. In 2010 she obtained a PhD. in literature and linguistics from UFBA, with a thesis on Literary Voices of Black Writers from Bahia, having begun to ask herself why she was only reading novels by American black women, such as Alice Walker and Toni Morrison, and not Brazilian black women. In 2016, she did post-doctoral studies at the Paris Descartes University.

== Career ==
Santiago worked as a teacher on the degree course of the teacher training centre (CFP) of UFRB and as an associate professor at UFRB. Part of her work involved a research project to map writers from Mozambique, São Tomé and Príncipe, Angola and Cape Verde. She was pro-rector of extension at UFRB and, as well, worked as a professor-researcher at the postgraduate programme in cultural criticism at UNEB. She is a researcher on the Women in Literature Working Group of the National Association of Postgraduate Studies and Research in Literature and Linguistics (ANPOLL); and is the editorial coordinator of Selo Katuka Edições, which aims to publish books by Afro-Brazilian authors and texts resulting from studies and research by black intellectuals from Brazil and Africa. Santiago's published work is mainly on the themes of Portuguese language teaching, text production, Brazilian literature, Afro-feminine literature, memory, identity, black Brazilian writers, black authorship, and females in Brazil and Africa.

Santiago retired from UFRB on 1 June 2020 but continued to do research work. In March 2023 she was invited to join the Ministry of Human Rights and Citizenship of the Federal Government, occupying the position of General Coordinator Sistema Nacional de Promoção da Igualdade Racial (National System for the Promotion of Racial Equality – SINAPIR).

== Publications ==
Santiago has published the following books as the sole author:

- Vozes Literárias Negras (2012).
- Cartographies under Construction – Some Writers from Mozambique (2019).
- Águas – Moradas de Memórias (2020).

She has also published two other books in association with other authors and numerous academic articles for journals.
