= Church of Our Lady of Protection (Santo Amaro) =

Church in Santo Amaro, Brazil

- Igreja de Nossa Senhora do Amparo
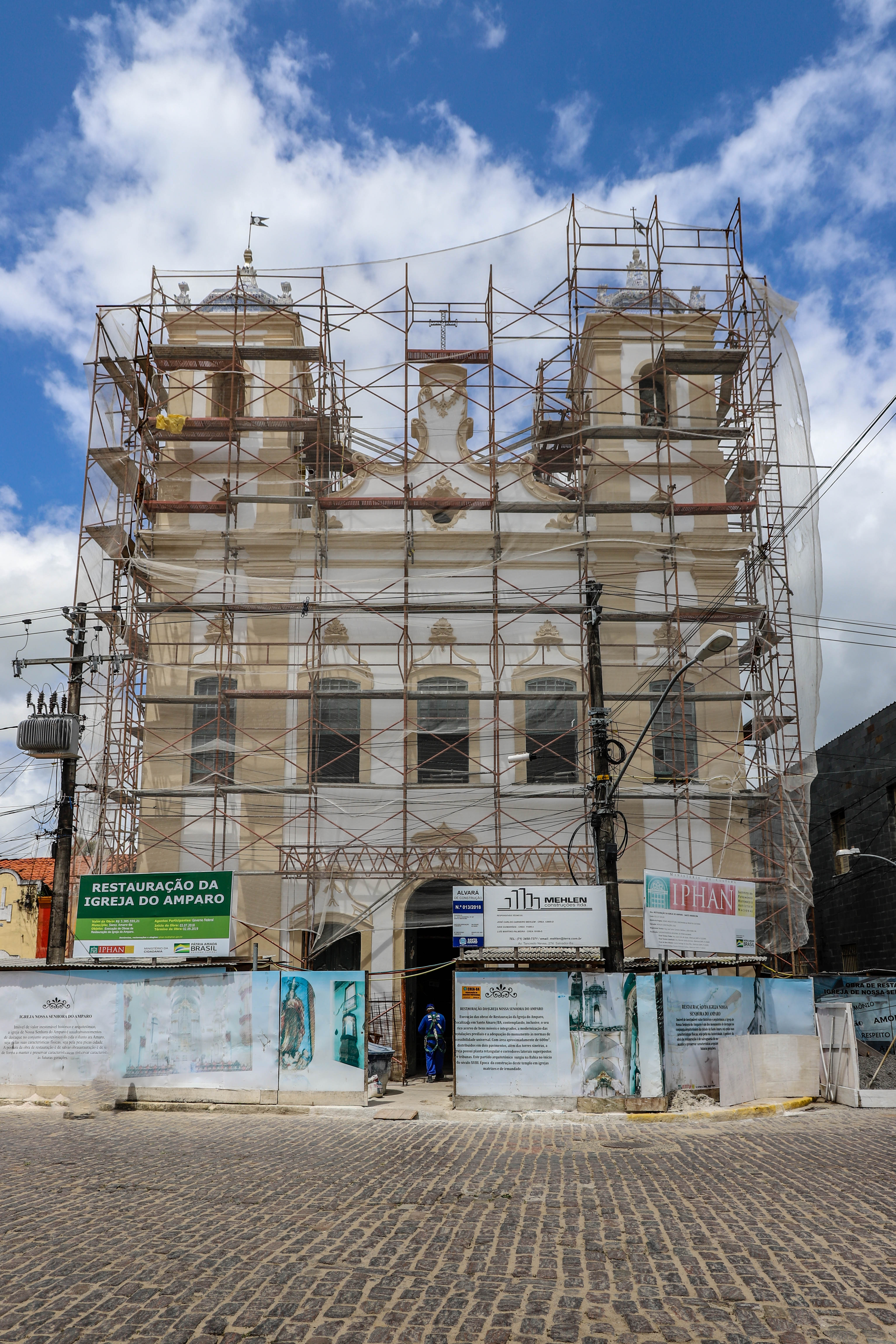
- Church of Our Lady of Protection, Santo Amaro, Bahia

- Location of the Church of Our Lady of Protection in Brazil

Religion
- Affiliation: Catholic
- Rite: Roman
- Ownership: Roman Catholic Diocese of Cruz das Almas

Location
- Municipality: Santo Amaro
- State: Bahia
- Country: Brazil
- Interactive map of Church of Our Lady of Protection
- Coordinates: 12.54914°S 38.70931°W

Architecture
- Style: Baroque, Neo-Classical
- Groundbreaking: 19th century

Specifications
- Direction of façade: South-East
- Interior area: 576 square metres (6,200 ft^{2})

The Church of Our Lady of Protection (Portuguese: Igreja de Nossa Senhora do Amparo) is a 19th-century Roman Catholic church located in Santo Amaro, Bahia, Brazil. The church is dedicated to Our Lady of Help and belongs to the Roman Catholic Diocese of Cruz das Almas. The church belongs to the Brotherhood of Our Lady of Amparo, which was generally made of mixed-race men, who often constituted the majority of the population of cities in Bahia. Our Lady of Amparo churches are also found in Valença, Bahia and São Cristóvão, Sergipe. The church, despite its construction in the 19th century, is similar to those of the previous century, with a nave, side corridors superimposed by galleries, a façade with monumental pediment, and bell towers on either side of the portals.

The church lacks federal, state, or municipal protection, but was named as part of the Heritage of Portuguese Influence sites by the Calouste Gulbenkian Foundation. The National Institute of Historic and Artistic Heritage started large-scale reform works on the church in 2018.

== History ==
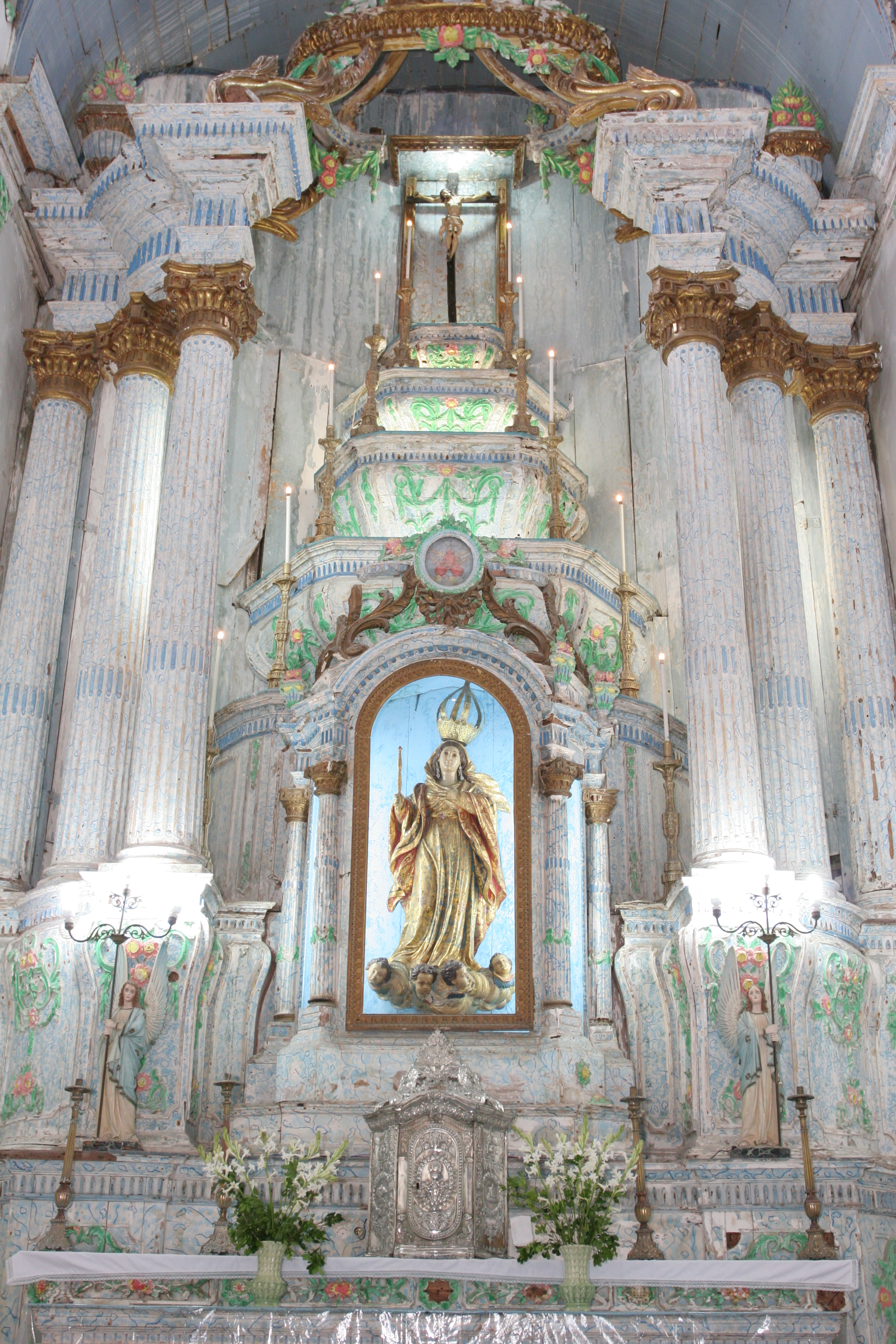
High altar of the Church of Our Lady of Protection

The Church of Our Lady of Protection was built in the early 19th century. It replaced a simple wattle and daub structure built in 1708. Father Aires do Casal noted in his Corografia Brasílica of 1817, that it belonged to the brotherhood of mixed-race men. It was referred to as the "Capella de N.S. do Ampero", under Father Manoel Francisco de Oliveira Bahia, in the Memorias da viagem de SS magestades imperials ás provincias da Bahia, Pernambuco, Parahiba, Alagoas, Sergipe, e Espirito-Santo of 1861. It was renovated, or possibly completed, in 1907 in the Neoclassical style, typical of church renovations in Bahia in the previous century. A plaque on the facade of the church dated February 2, 1907, probably commemorates the end of the reform works. The Neoclassical retable was likely installed during this renovation, replacing a simple retable of the previous century. The floors of the side corridors were repaired in 1965, and the roofing of the galleries and sacristies were replaced between 1967 and 1968.

== Location ==
The Church of Our Lady of Protection is part of the historic center of Santo Amaro. It is located at the south-western end of the Praça da Purificação, a public square. The church faces the Town Hall and is located on the corner of Vianna Bandeira and Maçonaria avenues.

== Structure ==
The Church of Our Lady of Protection is constructed of lime and stone masonry and covers 576 square metres (6,200 ft^{2}). The division of the plan of the church into three sections (a nave and two side corridors) is emphasized on the façade by pilasters. The church has gable roofs on the central body and lean-to roofs on the side bodies. The façade has three portals with five windows at the choir level. Each of the windows has an arched lintel.

The church has two bell towers with bulbous domes. The domes are covered with shards of tiles, a feature found in other churches of the region. The church has a monumental pediment with volutes, a stylized oculus at center, and a niche above. The church has three bronze bells, the largest dating to 1872.

=== Interior ===
The interior of the church consists of a nave and side corridors surmounted by tribunes, a plan typical of Bahian churches of the 17th century. A sacristy is located on either side of the chancel and are connected by a small corridor behind the rear of the chancel. The high altars and side altars are in the Neoclassical style with talha dourado, or gilded wood carvings. The chancel, like other churches of Salvador and the Recôncavo region, has a barrel vault with four lunettes. The chancel arch has a large cartouche at center; a large silver lamp hangs in front of it. The left side altar has an image of Christ Crucified above, and the right side altar images of equal size. The church has a rich collection of 19th century images, including statues of Saint Amaro, Saint Rita, Saint Gonsalo, Our Lady of Victory, Our Lady of Protection. The church additionally has two images of Christ Crucified. The right sacristy and nave have marble flooring with numerous tombs of members of the Brothership of Amparo.

== Access ==
The Church of Our Lady of Protection is open to the public and may be visited.
