= Terra Nova, Bahia =

Coordinates: 12°23′31″S 38°37′30″W

Terra Nova (Bahia)
- Municipality
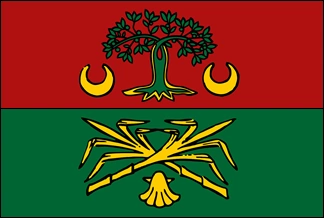
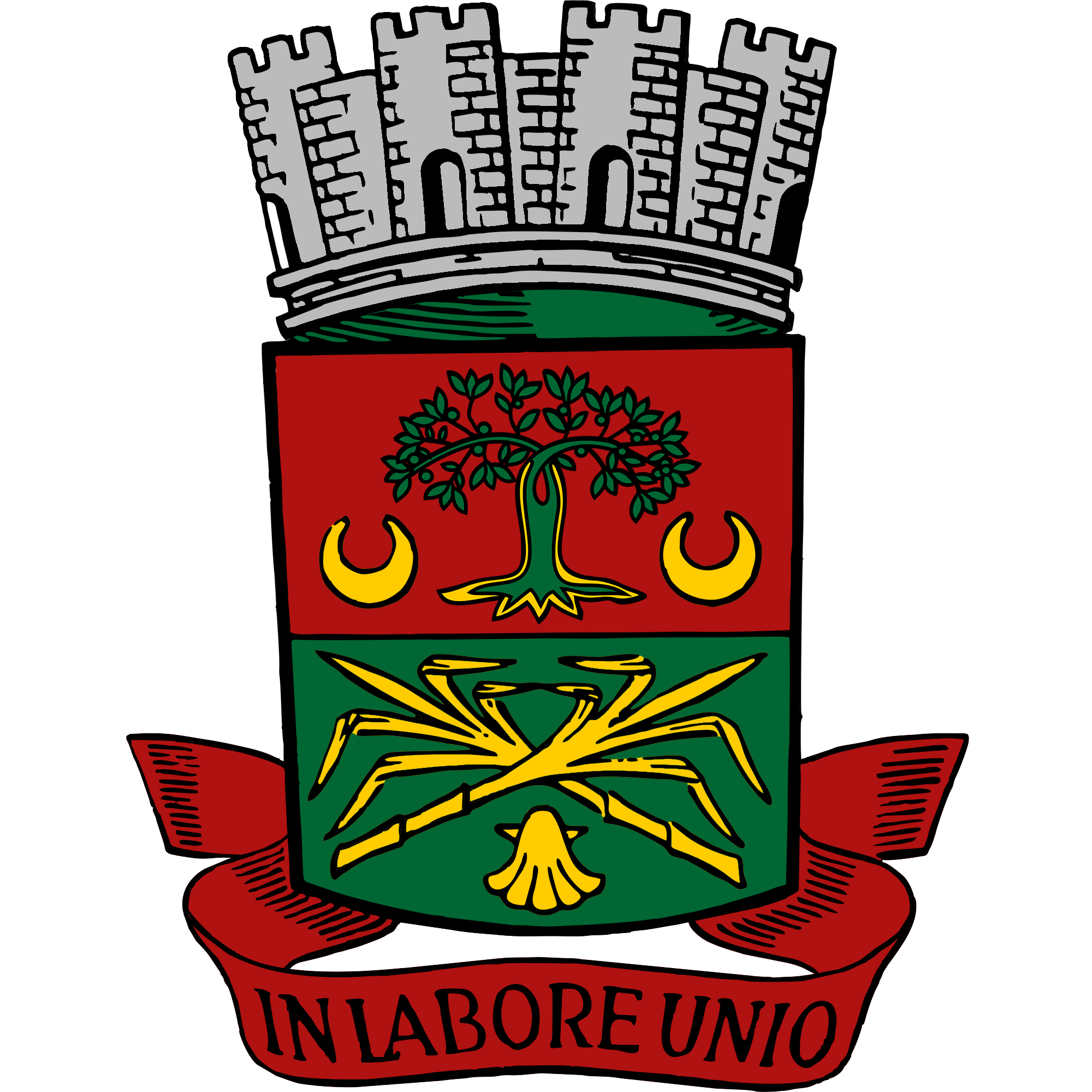
- Flag Coat of arms
- Interactive map of Terra Nova (Bahia)
- Country: Brazil
- Region: Nordeste
- State: Bahia

Population (2020)
  - Total: 13,025
- Time zone: UTC−3 (BRT)

Terra Nova (Bahia) is a municipality in the state of Bahia in the North-East region of Brazil. It is located at a latitude 12 ° 23'30 "South and longitude 38 ° 37'30 "west. It has a population of 13,025 (2020 estimate).

== History ==
In 1819, a fair was instituted, to take place every Thursday, by the owner of the Engenho de Aramaré Luis Paulino d'Oliveira Pinto da França. After this a town must have grown around the fairgrounds, and on land given by the family of Arthur Pacheco Pereira, a champion of the town's emancipation.

== See also ==
- List of municipalities in Bahia
