= Escola Bahiana de Medicina e Saúde Pública =

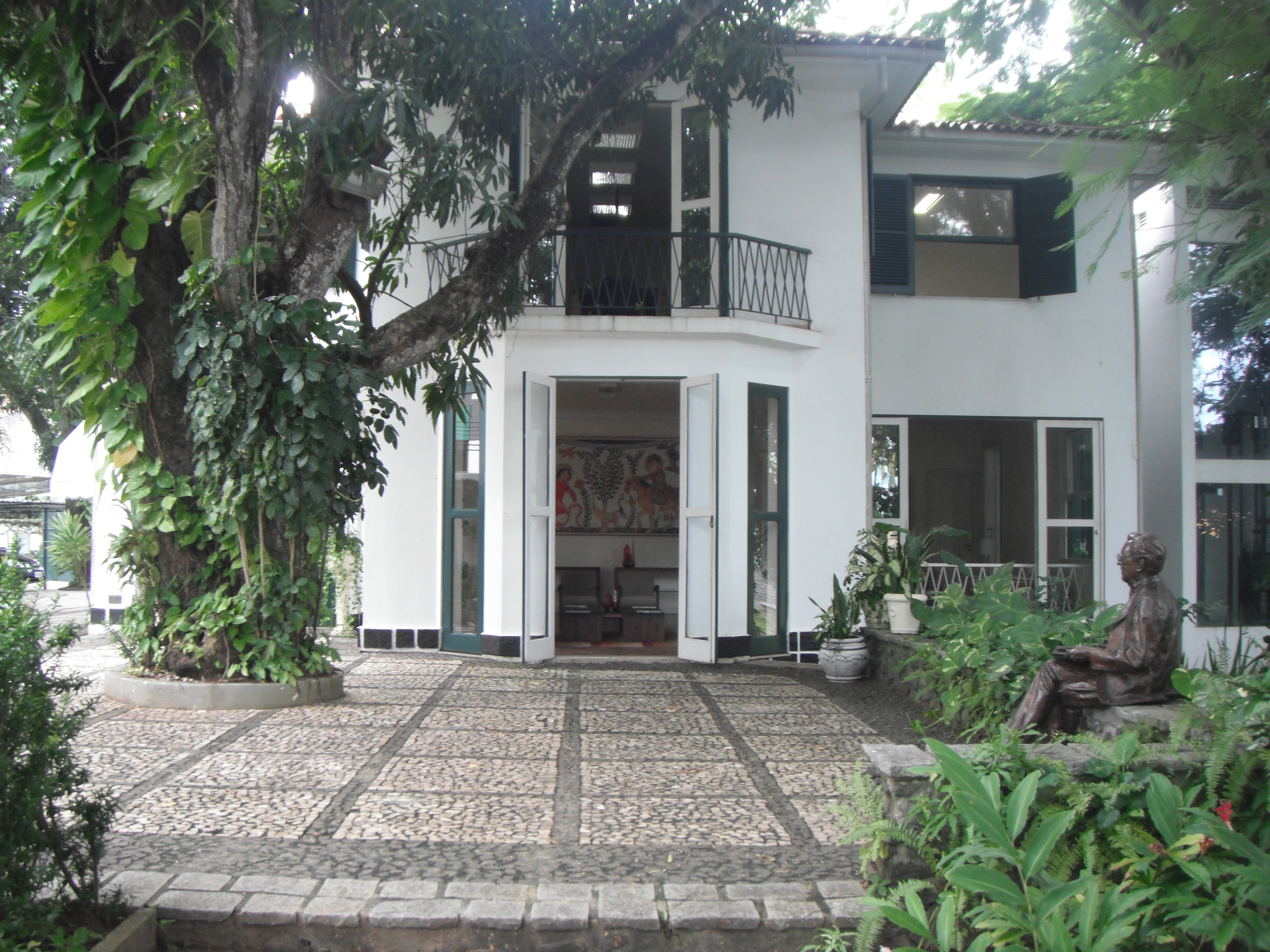
- Type: Private, non-profit
- Established: 1953
- Director: Maria Luisa Carvalho Soliani
- Location: Salvador, Bahia, Brazil
- Website: https://www.bahiana.edu.br

The Escola Bahiana de Medicina e Saúde Pública (Bahian School of Medicine and Public Health, known simply as Bahiana) is a private medical school in Salvador, Bahia, Brazil. It was established in 1953.

Bahiana currently offers seven undergraduate courses and postgraduate programs in several health sciences fields. The school is maintained by the Fundação Bahiana para Desenvolvimento das Ciências (Bahian Foundation for Science Development).

== History ==
After noticing the health care needs of Bahian society at the beginning of the 1950s, a group of doctors, academics, public managers and religious leaders from Salvador founded a new institution. At that time, the only medical school in the state was the Faculdade de Medicina da Bahia (Bahia Faculty of Medicine), which graduated 130 professionals per year.

The first group of teachers was chosen in January 1953. Admission exams were taken on April 14 of the same year. Later that month, Aristides Novis Filho gave the first lesson for the Medicine course. The first class graduated in 1958.

During the following decades, Bahiana expanded its activities to provide public health care assistance. In the 1970s, Bahaina purchased an area of 6,500 m^{2} (70,000 ft^{2}) in the Brotas neighborhood. Years later, Bahaina bought the former Santa Terezinha Preventorium building for its first health care centre, the Ambulatório Docente-Assistencial da Bahiana (ADAB) (Bahaina Teaching and Healthcare Outpatient Centre). In 1998, a new building situated near ADAB was built to become Bahiana's second campus, the Brotas Academic Unit.

In 1999, Bahiana opened the Cabula Academic Unit, located in the district of Cabula.

It is dedicated to some free of charge health services.

== Academic units ==
Bahiana's academic activities are held in two units, located in the districts of Brotas and Cabula.

=== Brotas ===
The Brotas Academic Unit holds activities for undergraduate and postgraduate programs. The Ambulatório Docente-Assistencial da Bahiana is located nearby, where a multidisciplinary team of professionals, teachers and students from diverse fields provide free health care services.

=== Cabula ===
The Cabula Academic Unit is home to Bahiana's Biomedicine, Medicine, Dentistry and Nursing courses. Built on a green area of 70,000 m^{2} (17 acres), it hosts the majority of Bahiana's main events, such as the Mostra Científica e Cultural (Science and Culture Exhibition), the Pedagogic Forum, the Nursing, Biomedicine and Dentistry journeys, admission exams and freshman welcome receptions.

== Undergraduate programs ==
- Medicine
- Physical therapy
- Psychology
- Dentistry
- Biomedicine
- Nursery
- Physical Education

== Postgraduate programs ==
Bahiana offers several postgraduate courses, including Master of Science and Doctoral programs. The school also has 32 research groups registered on the CNPq Lattes platform.

== Admissions ==
Since 2008, undergraduates have had to pass through an admission process called Processo Seletivo Formativo (PROSEF), which allows them to experience their future profession and interact with teachers and classmates.

== Health care centres ==
- ADAB Brotas - Ambulatório Docente-Assistencial Multiprofissional (general services)
- ADAB Cabula - Ambulatório Docente-Assistencial Odontológico (dental services)
- Centro Integrado e Multidisciplinar de HTLV e Hepatites Virais (HTLV and hepatitis viruses services)
- CAFIS - Clínica Avançada em Fisioterapia (Physical Therapy)
- SEPSI - Serviço de Psicologia (Psychology)
- SerTO - Serviço de Terapia Ocupacional (Occupational Therapy)

== Scientific publications ==
- Brazilian Journal of Medicine and Human Health
- Revista Pesquisa em Fisioterapia (Research in Physical Therapy)
- Revista Enfermagem Contemporânea (Contemporary Nursery)
- Revista Psicologia, Diversidade e Saúde (Psychology, Diversity and Health)
- Revista Bahiana de Odontologia (Bahian Journal of Odontology)
