= Federal University of Bahia =

Public university in Salvador, Brazil

Coordinates: 12°59′37″S 38°31′13″W

- Universidade Federal da Bahia
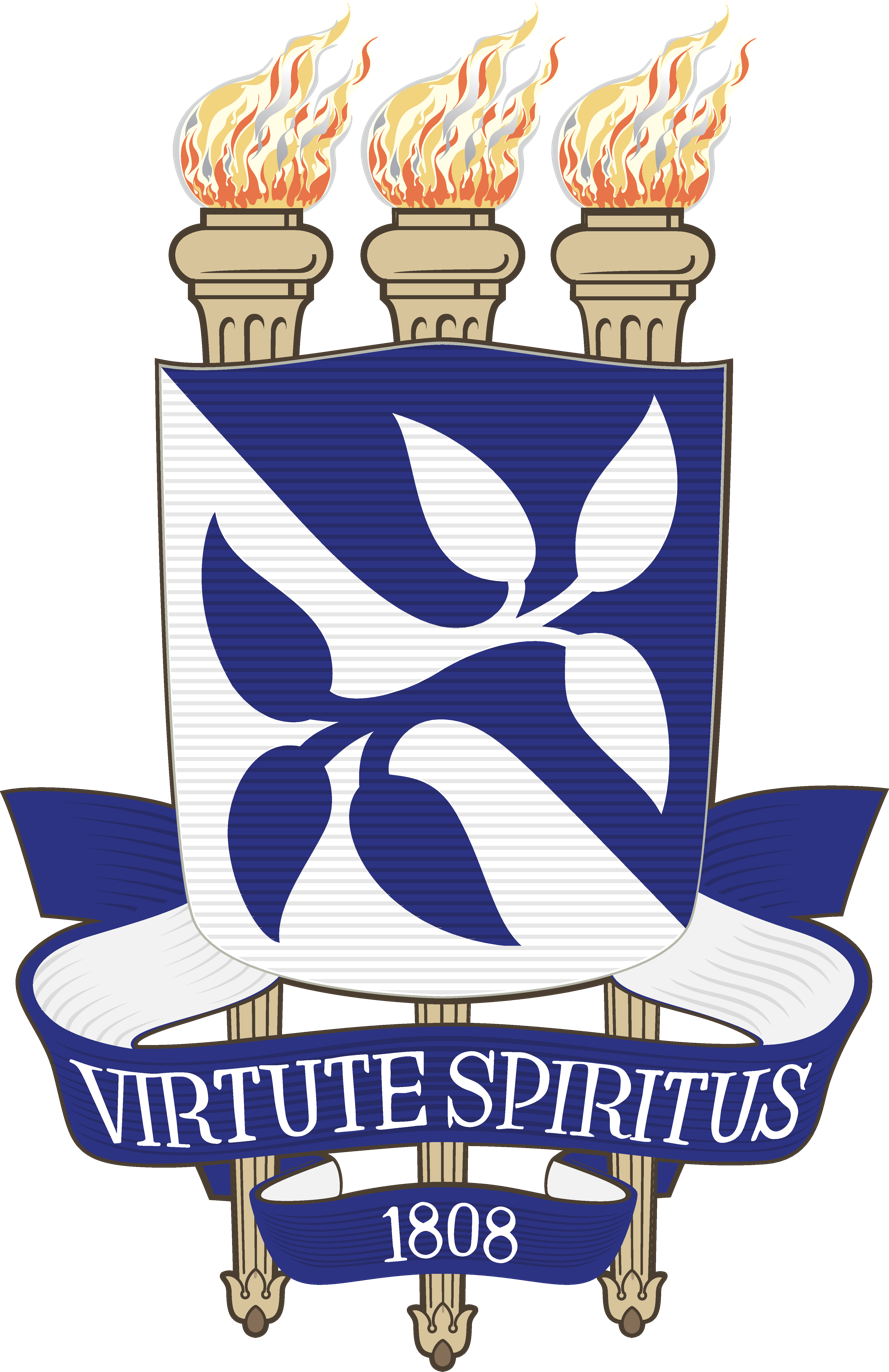
- Coat of arms of the university
- Other names: UFBA
- Motto: Virtute spiritus
- Motto in English: Virtue of the Spirit
- Type: Public university
- Established: April 8, 1946 (oldest course from February 18, 1808)
- Budget: R$ 1,709,151,955.00 (2016)
- Rector: Paulo César Miguez de Oliveira
- Vice rector: Penildon Silva Filho
- Academic staff: 1,768
- Students: 27,549
- Undergraduates: 24,075
- Postgraduates: 3,474
- Other students: 22,705
- Location: Salvador (main campus), Barreiras, Vitória da Conquista, Bahia, Brazil
- Campus: Urban
- Colors: Blue & white
- Website: www.portal.ufba.br

The Federal University of Bahia (Portuguese: Universidade Federal da Bahia, UFBA) is a public university located mainly in the city of Salvador. It is the largest university in the state of Bahia.

Students can study there without paying tuition fees, as it is a public university. To join the university they must pass an annual examination, known as the "ENEM" (National High School Exam).

== History ==
UFBA was created on April 8, 1946, through Decree-Law 9155. Earlier, the Federal University of Bahia was formed by the Faculty of Medicine and their associated schools, Dentistry and Pharmacy, and the schools of Philosophy, Economics, Law beyond the Polytechnic School. The actual installation of the university took place on July 2, 1946, the oldest center of higher education in the country, the Faculty of Medicine at the Shrine of Jesus.

Four years later, the Federal University of Bahia was federalized. On December 4, 1950, the government enacted the 2234 law setting the Federal System of Higher Education. Since then, the university has been called the Federal University of Bahia. The history of higher education in the state dates back to 1808 when, for determination of the Portuguese court, the first school of medical education in the country was established: the Medical School of Bahia. This was followed by the Faculty of Pharmacy (1832), School of Fine Arts (1877), School of Law (1891), Polytechnique School (1897), School of Economics (1905), School of Philosophy, Sciences and Letters (1943), School of Librarianship (1942) that formed part of others since 1946.

== Student life ==
The university has 57 undergraduate courses, 82 post-graduate courses and more than 100 postgraduate courses. UFBA is one of the first universities in Brazil, having locations throughout the capital of Bahia and one inside, in Vitória da Conquista (south-west).

In 2008, there were three campuses. The candidates per vacancy average was 6.2. The UFBA's Cooperation Agreements has 32 countries (such as the United States, Sweden, Argentina, South Africa, New Zealand, and others).

== Notable alumni ==
- Gilberto Gil, musician
- Milton Santos, geographer
- Wagner Moura, actor
- Ananda Nahu, artist
- Caetano Veloso, musician
- Raul Seixas, musician
- Julio Licinio, psychiatrist and scientist
- Carlos Marighella, politician
- Jean Wyllys, politician
- Norberto Odebrecht, engineer
- Jaqueline Goés de Jesus, scientist
- Eliana Calmon, first woman member of Brazil's Superior Court of Justice (STJ)
- Ana Rita Santiago, academic and author
- Hildegardes Vianna, journalist and folklorist
- Creuza Oliveira, trade unionist

== See also ==
- Brazil university rankings
- List of federal universities of Brazil
- Universities and higher education in Brazil
