= BronxArtSpace =

Non-profit gallery

Coordinates: 40°48′42.5″N 73°55′29.5″W

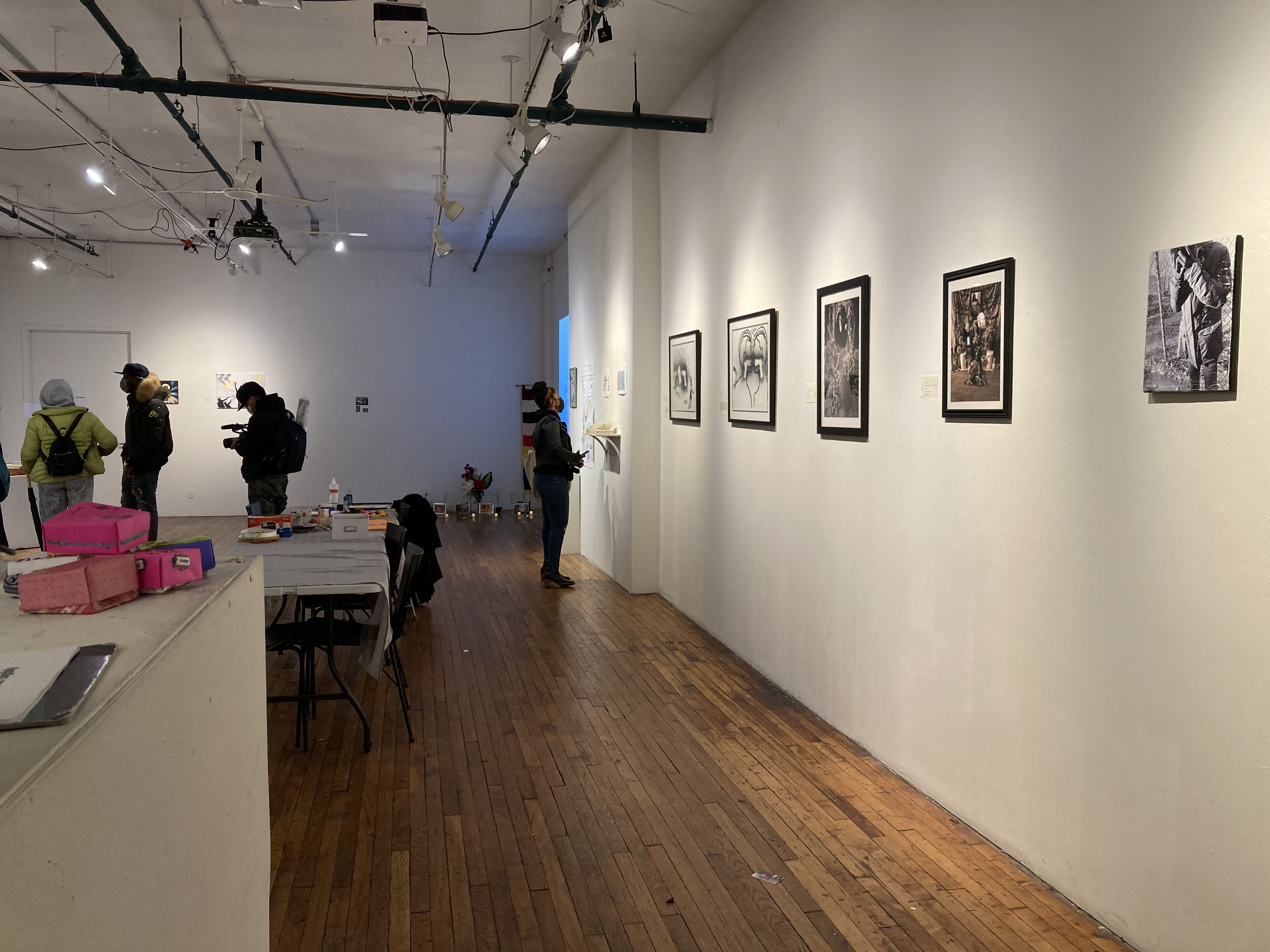
- Established: 2008 (17 years ago)
- Location: 305 E 140th Street #1, Bronx, NY 10454, United States
- Type: Art gallery
- Founder: Linda Cunningham
- Director: Linda Cunningham
- Website: bronxartspace.com

BronxArtSpace is a non-profit gallery that promotes underrepresented and emerging artists and curators. It is an independent venue not associated with any college or institution.

It fosters arts education through exhibitions and cultural events in Mott Haven in the South Bronx, New York City. Events include exhibitions in collaboration with visual artists, performers, filmmakers, dancers, musicians, actors and curators. BronxArtSpace was started in 2008 by artists Linda Cunningham and Mitsu Hadeishi.

When she couldn't afford living in Soho anymore, Cunningham moved to an apartment building in Mott Haven. She renovated the five-story building on East 140th Street and created the BronxArtSpace gallery on the ground floor.

== Recent developments ==
In 2021 Hunter College alumna Beverly Emers made her curatorial debut at BronxArtSpace, she presented “Giving Light: An Art Antidote to Gun Violence”, an art exhibition of diverse media about gun violence as a public health crisis. Participating artists included: Élan Cadiz, Julia Justo, Morcey Felix, Nicky Enright, Shelley Feinerman, Noble Dre Ali, Ron Baker, Siva Daniel, Tammy Wofsey, Tasha Douge and Wilhelmina Grant.
