= Teodoro Sampaio, Bahia =

Municipality of Bahia State, Brazil

Teodoro Sampaio
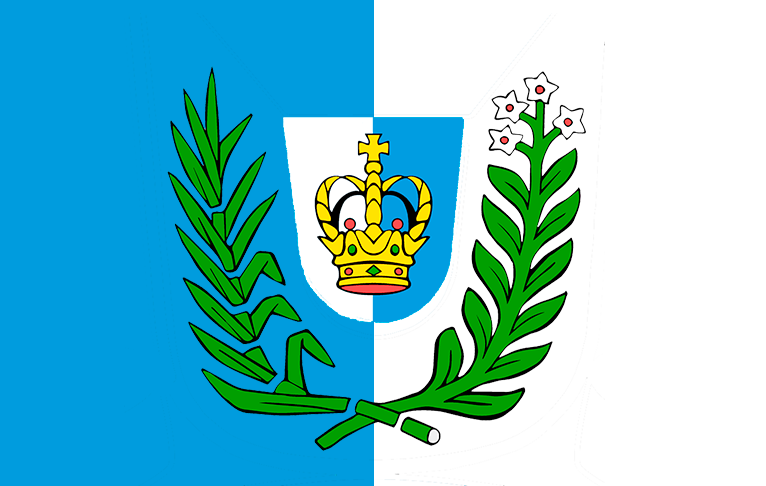
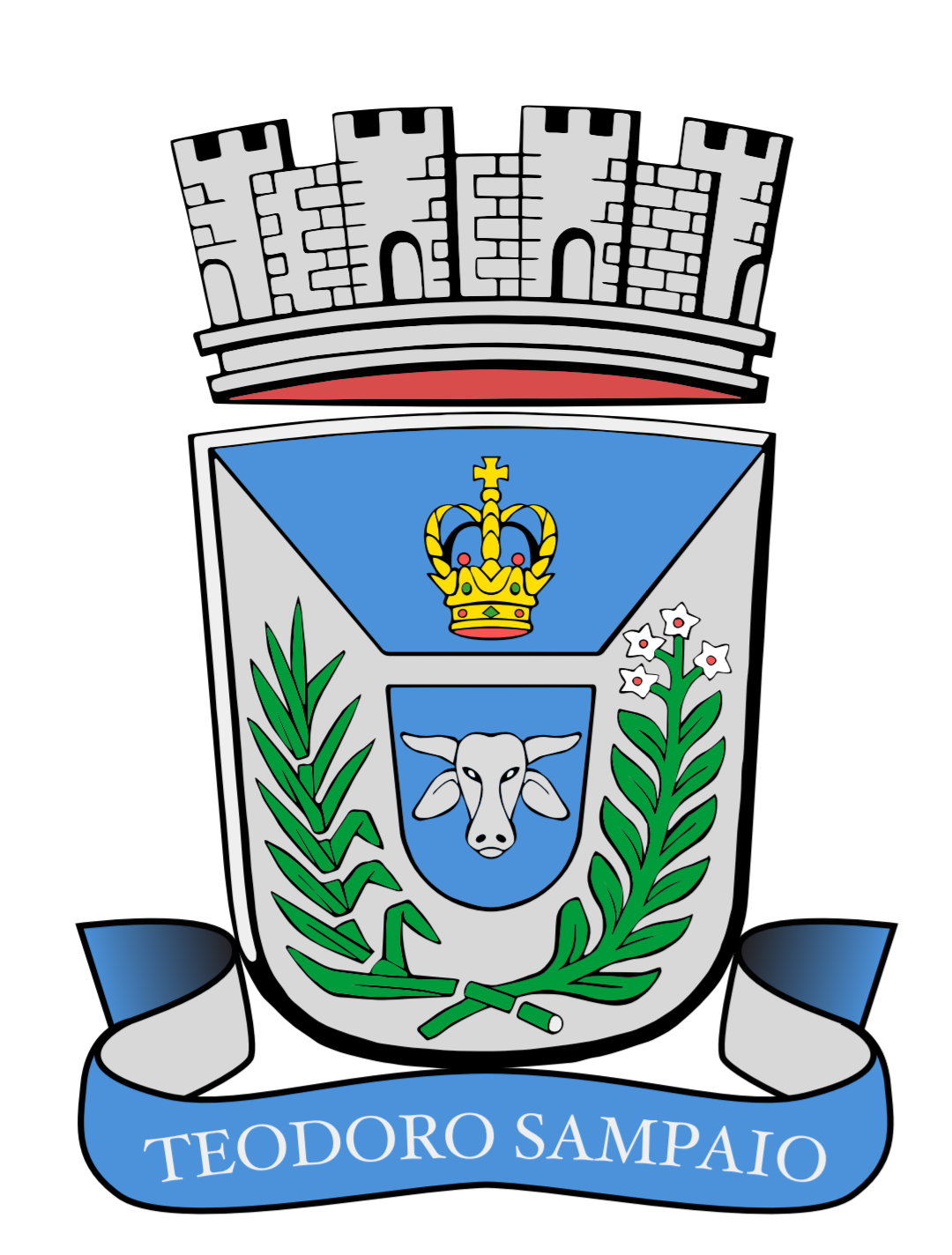
- Flag Coat of arms

- Coordinates: 12°18′10″S 38°38′34″W
- Region: Nordeste
- State: Bahia
- Founded: 12 July 1921
- Elevation: 121 m (397 ft)

Population (2020)
  - Total: 7,359
- Time zone: UTC−3 (BRT)
- Postal code: 2931400

Teodoro Sampaio is a municipality in the state of Bahia in the North-East region of Brazil.

== See also ==
- List of municipalities in Bahia
