= Order of Labour Merit =

Order of Labor Merit
- Type: State Order
- Awarded for: Employees and employers who distinguished themselves by deserving national recognition in industry, trade or similar activities
- Country: Brazil
- Presented by: Minister of Labour, Industry and Trade (Brazil)
- Eligibility: Citizens of Brazil and Foreigners
- Established: 17 November 1965; 61 years ago
- Ribbon bar of the order

Order of Labor Merit, in 2007 renamed the Order of Labor Merit of Getúlio Vargas (Portuguese: Ordem do Mérito do Trabalho Getúlio Vargas) – Brazilian departmental decoration.

== History ==
Its creation was generally decided in the decree of President Eurico Gaspar Dutra of August 22, 1950, when it was decided that the Minister of Labour, Industry and Trade would have the right to present awards to employees and employers who distinguished themselves by deserving national recognition in industry, trade or similar activities.

The order was actually established on November 17, 1965 by President Humberto de Alencar Castelo Branco, when the order received its proper name, division into classes, etc.

In 2007, this order gained a patron - it was President Getúlio Vargas, whose name was included in the name of the order.

== Current form ==
Since 1968, it has been divided into five classes, with quotas of decorated Brazilians in the top classes:

- 1st class – Grand Cross (Grã-Cruz), 150 people;
- 2nd class – Grand Officer (Grande Oficial), 250 people;
- 3rd class – Commander (Comendador), 400 people;
- 4th class – Officer (Oficial), no limits;
- 5th class – Bachelor (Cavaleiro), no limits.

Previously, the order was divided into three degrees:

1. Great Merit (Grande Mérito)
2. Special Merit (Mérito Especial)
3. Merit (Mérito)

The order is currently awarded by the Minister of Labor and Social Security for Brazilians and foreigners. It is awarded to:

1. those who have shown significant contributions to the country;
2. those who have distinguished themselves significantly in the performance of their profession;
3. employees, employers, officials, members of religious communities and personalities who, through their efforts in creating or distributing services of general interest, in work and production, have become models for the community;
4. employers who collaborate extensively on initiatives aimed at the social well-being of their employees and communities;
5. those who have engaged and succeeded in the fight for greater productivity;
6. those who have shown exceptional and outstanding trade union activity in the high sense of cooperation with the state, for the achievement of social peace and its development in all fields;
7. those who have distinguished themselves in encouraging vocational training, occupational health and safety, and in enhancing social security;
8. those who have proved exceptionally gifted in public service;
9. those who have distinguished themselves for their culture, scientific and technical abilities;
10. those who in any way contributed significantly to the prestige of Brazil abroad, in the above-mentioned cases.

== Grades ==
- Order of Labor Merit of Getúlio Vargas (Class I: Grand Cross) (Note: Portuguese: Ordem do Mérito do Trabalho Getúlio Vargas – Grã-Cruz) (Brazil)
- Order of Labor Merit of Getúlio Vargas (Class II: Grand Officer) (Note: Portuguese: Ordem do Mérito do Trabalho Getúlio Vargas – Grande Oficial) (Brazil)
- Order of Labor Merit of Getúlio Vargas (Class III: Commander) (Note: Portuguese: Ordem do Mérito do Trabalho Getúlio Vargas – Comendador) (Brazil)
- Order of Labor Merit of Getúlio Vargas (Class IV: Officer) (Note: Portuguese: Ordem do Mérito do Trabalho Getúlio Vargas – Oficial) (Brazil)
- Order of Labor Merit of Getúlio Vargas (Class V: Knight) (Note: Portuguese: Ordem do Mérito do Trabalho Getúlio Vargas – Cavaleiro) (Brazil)

== Officials ==
The grand master of the order is the incumbent president of Brazil, and the minister of labor and social security is the chancellor of the order, and they head the order's chapter. Awarded ex officio with the Grand Cross are the above-mentioned the president and the minister, and the other members of the chapter of the order are awarded – upon assuming the function – the class of the order appropriate to the official position held by them.
