= Town Hall (Santo Amaro) =

Town Hall of Santo Amaro
- Paço Municipal, formerly the Casa de Câmara e Cadeia
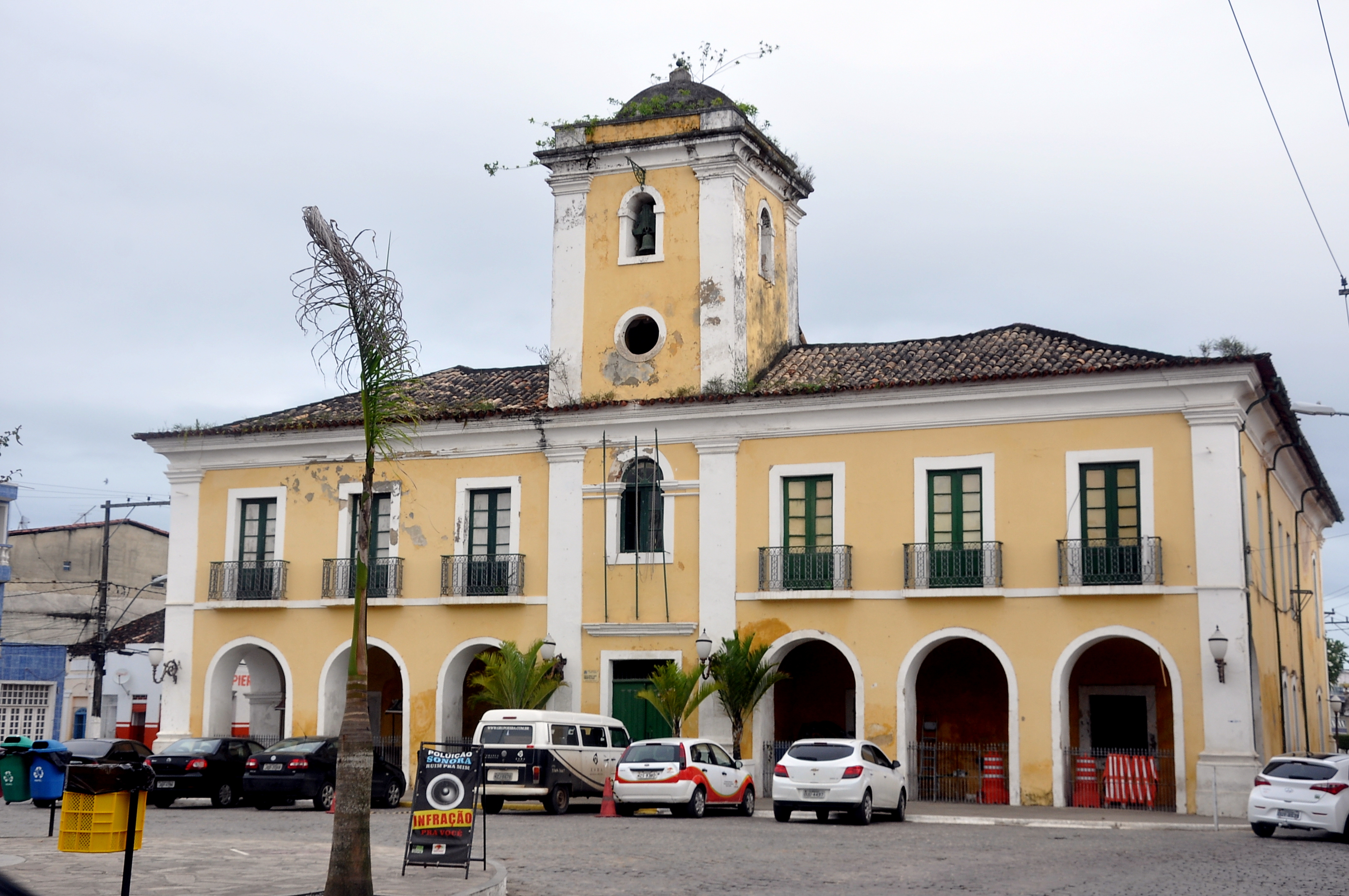
- Town Hall of Santo Amaro, Santo Amaro, Bahia, Brazil

- Location within Brazil

General information
- Type: Town hall
- Location: Santo Amaro, Bahia, Brazil
- Coordinates: 12.5486°S 38.7085°W
- Completed: 1769

Technical details
- Floor count: 2
- Floor area: 1,543 square metres (16,610 ft^{2})

National Historic Heritage of Brazil
- Designated: 1941
- Reference no.: 285

The Town Hall of Santo Amaro (Portuguese: Paço Municipal, formerly the Portuguese: Casa de Câmara e Cadeia) is an 18th-century municipal building in Santo Amaro, Bahia, Brazil. The building is located in the Historic Center of the city on the Praça da Purificação, a public square. The town hall sits opposite of the Parish Church of Our Lady of Purification and the Church of Our Lady of Protection faces the rear of the structure. The structure has two stories and covers 1,543 square metres (16,610 ft^{2}). The façade is divided into three parts with a bell tower at center, a feature found in other town halls of the period in Bahia. The bell tower has a hemispherical dome. The town hall was completed in 1769 and served as both an administrative building and prison in the 18th century, but now serves as a municipal government office.

The gravestone of Francisco Lourenço de Araújo (1816-1893), a hero of the Paraguayan War, is located in the courtyard of the Town Hall. Araújo was a wealthy sugarcane plantation owner and styled the Baron of Sergy after the Paraguayan War. He was the only person to hold the title.

== History ==
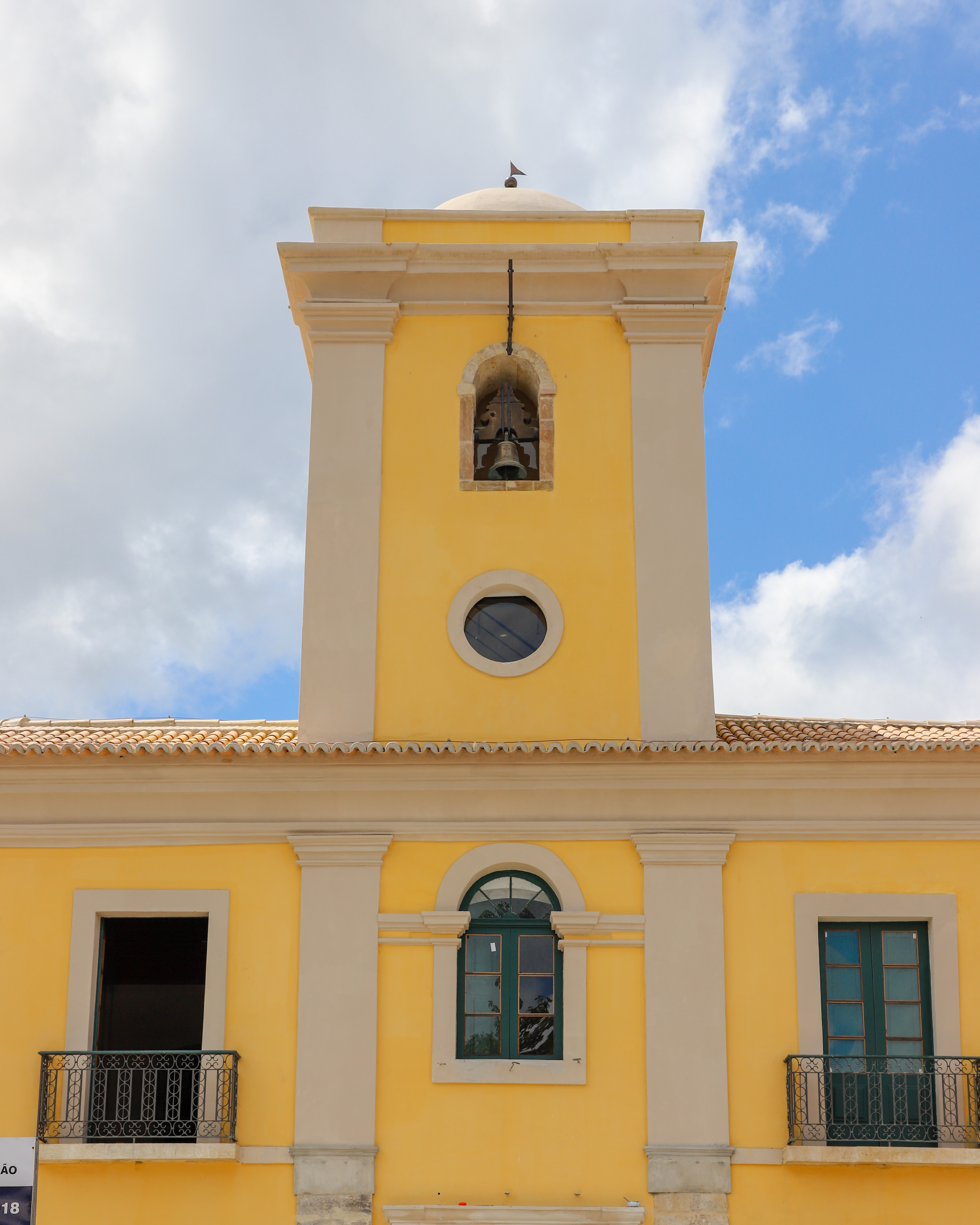
Detail of bell tower

The village of Santo Amaro was established in 1727, and solicitation for funds for a town hall and prison soon followed. The building was inaugurated in 1769. Its design follows that of the Municipal Palace of Salvador, and resembles the Town Hall and Prison of Maragogipe (1737). The headquarters of Imprensa Oficial da Vila, a publishing company, began operations in the building in 1916. The jail, which had operated on the ground floor of the town hall since its inception, was transferred elsewhere in the early 20th century.

== Structure ==
The Town Hall and Prison of Santo Amaro, like many others in Bahia, has two stories that surround a central rectangular patio. It covers 1,543 square metres (16,610 ft^{2}). The façade of the town hall is divided into three parts vertically by pilasters. The central section has a bell tower with a shallow hemispherical dome, a feature found in the town hall of Salvador. The bell tower has stone-framed openings on four sides, as well as an oculus facing the town square. The side bodies of the structure have galleries with three arches at the ground level, and three corresponding pulpit windows above. The windows on the upper level have iron balconets, and span three sides of the building. The town hall has a hipped roof with eight slopes and glazed clay barrel tiles.

The interior of the town hall retains some of its original design elements. It has a main staircase at the entrance. Some doorframes retain their original woodcarving.

== Protected status ==
The Town Hall of Santo Amaro was listed as a historic structure by the National Institute of Historic and Artistic Heritage in 1941. Both the structure and its contents were included in the IPHAN directive under inscription number 285.

== Access ==
The Town Hall of Santo Amaro functions as a municipal government building and may be visited.
