= Subaé River =

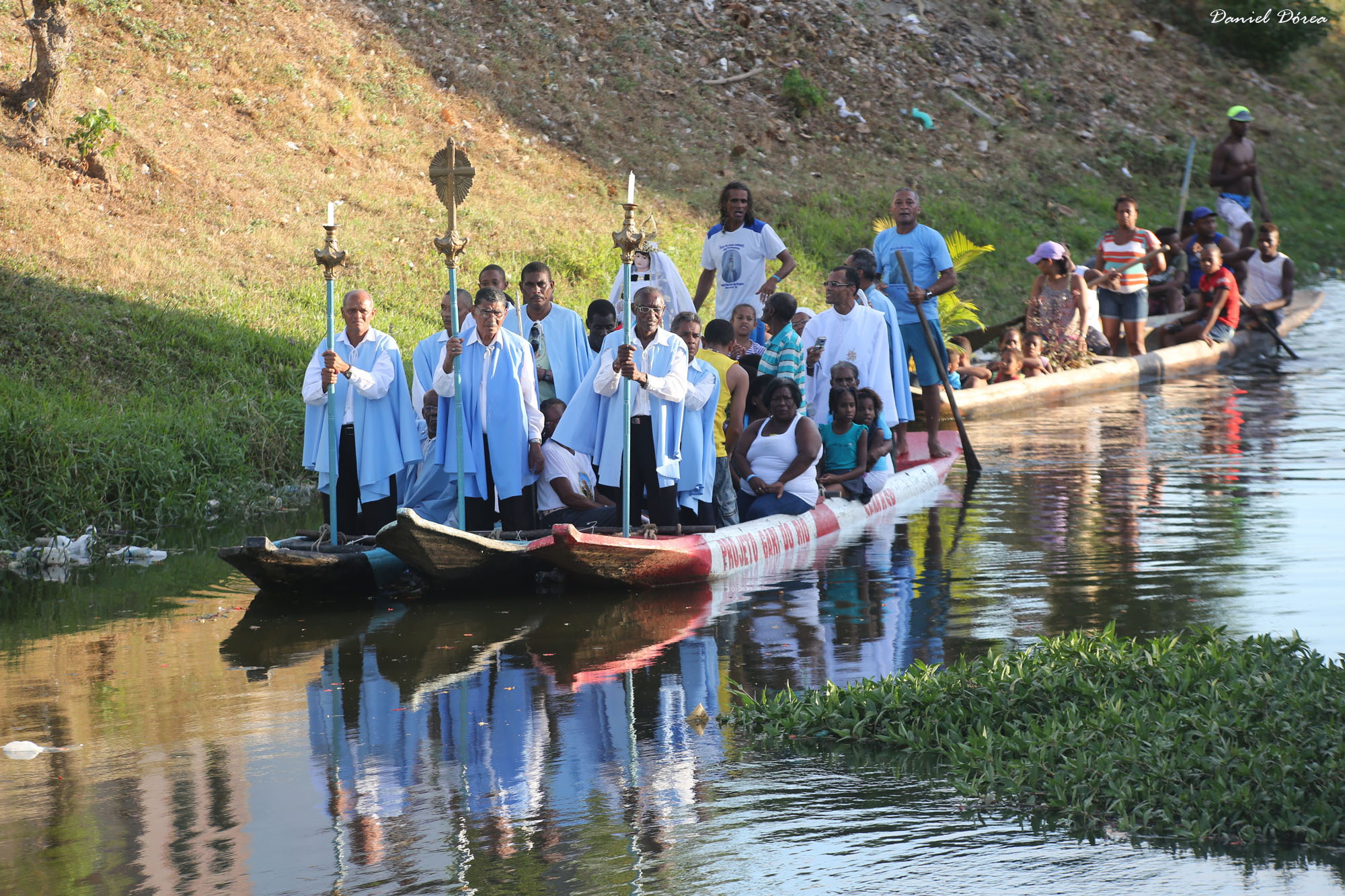

- Location within Brazil
- Native name: Rio Subaé (Portuguese)

Location
- Country: Brazil

Physical characteristics
- Source
  - location: Feira de Santana
- Mouth
  - location: Baía de Todos os Santos
  - coordinates: 12.562354°S 38.695873°W
- Length: 55 kilometres (34 mi)

The Subaé River (Portuguese: Rio Subaé) is a river in Bahia state of Brazil. It has its source in the city of Feira de Santana and runs 55 kilometres (34 mi) to the mouth at the Baía de Todos os Santos. The river was used by the Portuguese to create a large-scale sugarcane production in the Recôncavo region. The city of Santo Amaro was built on terraced land above the river. It has a single tributary, the Serjimirim River.

== Pollution ==
The Subaé River is polluted along much of its course, notably by lead, zinc, and cadmium. Lead pollution originated in industrial sewage of a processing facility owned by the Companhia Brasileira de Chumbo, now defunct.
