= Diocese of Cruz das Almas =

Catholic ecclesiastical territory

Diocese of Cruz das Almas Diocese de Cruz das Almas
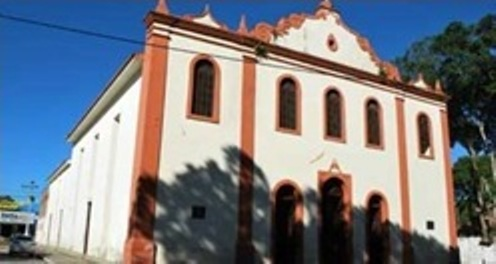

Location
- Country: Brazil
- Ecclesiastical province: São Salvador da Bahia

Statistics
- Area: 2,409 km^{2} (930 sq mi)
- Population: Total; Catholics: (as of 2017); 324,392; 191,228 (59%)
- Parishes: 16

Information
- Denomination: Catholic Church
- Rite: Roman Rite
- Established: 22 November 2017 (8 years ago)
- Cathedral: Catedral Nossa Senhora do Bom Sucesso
- Secular priests: 19

Current leadership
- Pope: Leo XIV
- Bishop: Antônio Tourinho Neto
- Metropolitan Archbishop: Murilo Sebastião Ramos Krieger

The Roman Catholic Diocese of Cruz das Almas is located in the city of Cruz das Almas, Bahia, Brazil. It is a suffragan see to the Archdiocese of São Salvador da Bahia.

== History ==
On 22 November 2017, Pope Francis established the Diocese of Cruz das Almas from the Archdiocese of São Salvador da Bahia.

== Ordinaries ==
- Antônio Tourinho Neto (22 Nov 2017–present)
