= Dayane Pimentel =

Brazilian politician (born 1986)

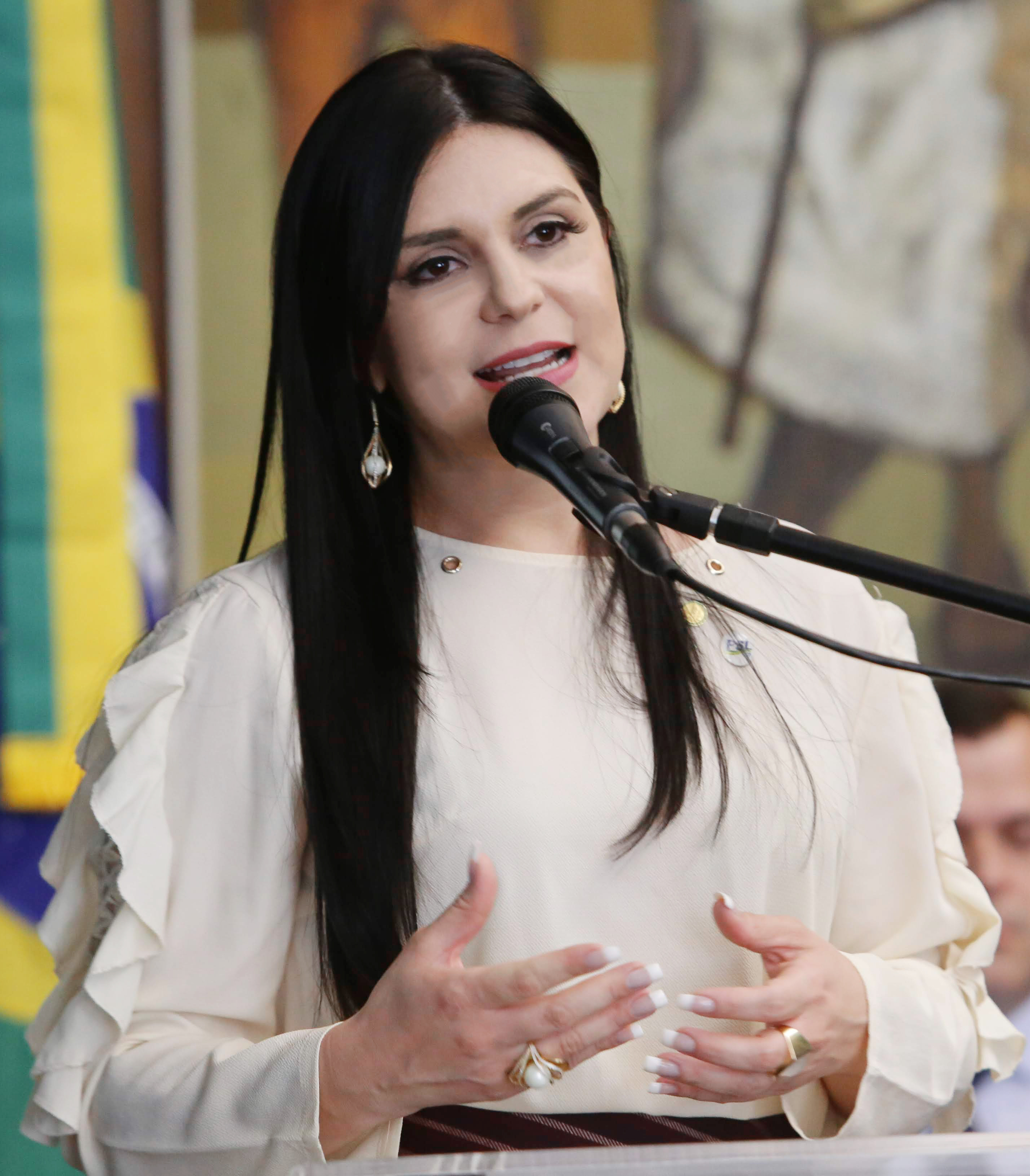

Member of the Chamber of Deputies
- In office 1 February 2019 – 1 February 2023
- Constituency: Bahia

Personal details
- Born: Dayane Jamille Carneiro dos Santos Pimentel; 30 January 1986 (age 40) Feira de Santana, Bahia, Brazil
- Party: UNIÃO (since 2022)
- Other political affiliations: PSL (2018–2022)
- Education: State University of Feira de Santana (BLitt)

Dayane Jamille Carneiro dos Santos Pimentel (born 30 January 1986) better known as Dayane Pimentel, is a Brazilian politician and professor. She has spent her political career representing Bahia, having served as federal deputy representative since 2019.

== Personal life ==
Pimentel grew up in a liberal family, in her youth she was part of the city council campaign of her PT affiliated uncle. Before becoming a politician Pimentel worked as a college professor. Today she considers herself a "former leftist" and regards Jair Bolsonaro as her idol.

== Political career ==
In the 2018 Brazilian general election, Pimentel was elected to the federal chamber of deputies with 136,742 votes, making her the fourth most voted candidate in the state of Bahia that election.
