= Municipal Market of Feira de Santana =

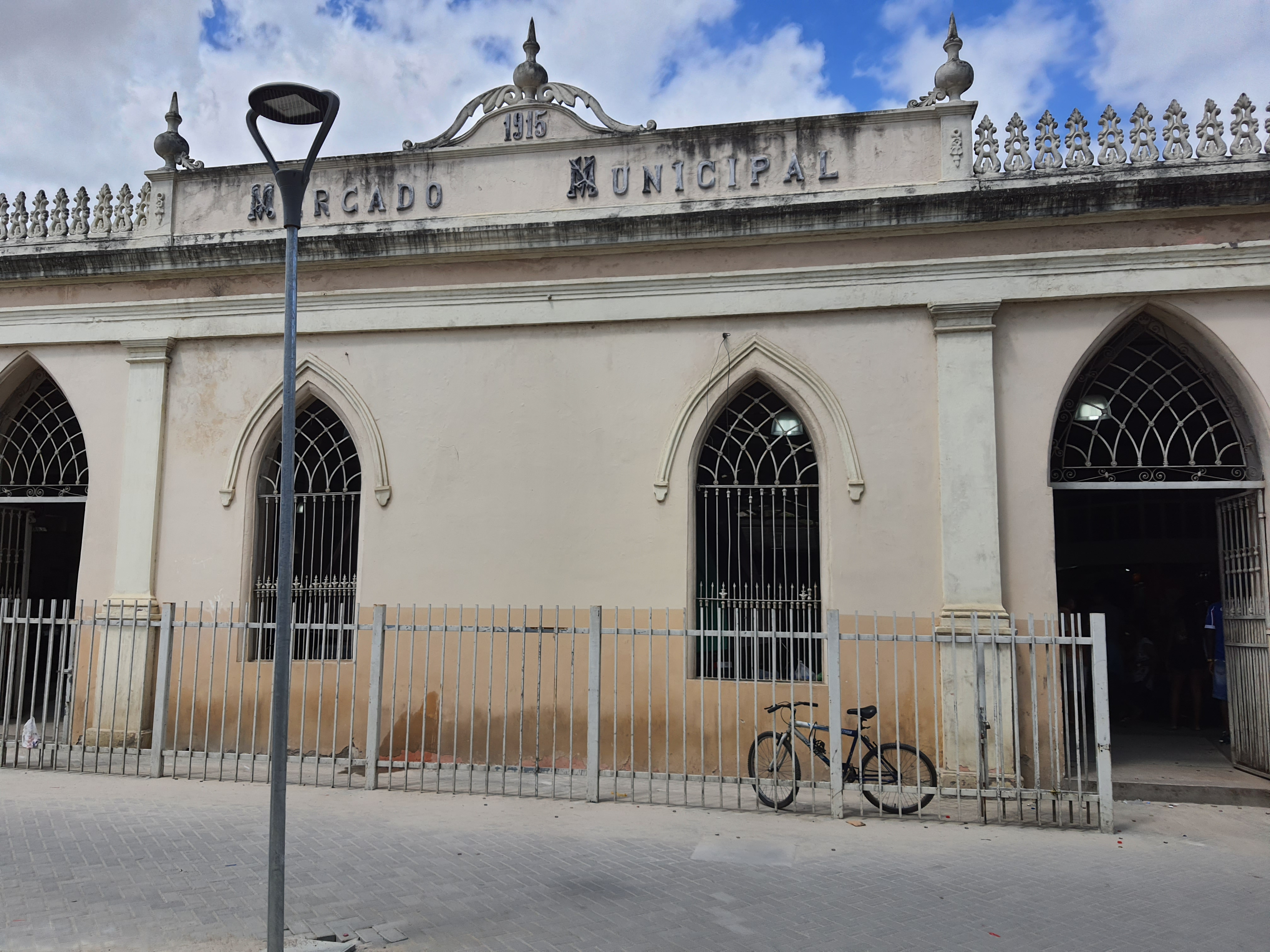

- Location within Brazil
- Alternative names: Market of Popular Arts (Portuguese: Mercado de Arte Popular)

General information
- Type: public market
- Architectural style: Eclectic
- Location: Praça João Pedreira, s/nº, Centro, Feira de Santana, Bahia, Brazil, Feira de Santana, Bahia, Brazil
- Coordinates: 12.254874717893735°S 38.9661216227311°W
- Construction started: 1906
- Inaugurated: March 27, 1915

Technical details
- Floor count: 1
- Floor area: 2,562 square metres (27,580 ft^{2})

Design and construction
- Engineer: Acciolly Ferreira da Silva

The Municipal Market of Feira de Santana (Portuguese: Mercado Municipal de Feira de Santana), also known as the Market of Popular Arts (Portuguese: Mercado de Arte Popular), is a public market in Feira de Santana, Bahia, Brazil. It was commissioned by the municipality of Feira de Santana in 1901 and inaugurated in 1915. It was designed by Acciolly Ferreira da Silva in an Eclecticism style with both Neoclassical and Gothic revival elements. It shares many design elements with the nearby Town Hall of Feira de Santana, also designed by Ferreira da Silva. The market covers 2,562 square metres (27,580 ft^{2}). The building was listed as a state heritage site by the Institute of Artistic and Cultural Heritage of Bahia in 1994.

== Location ==
The Municipal Market is located on Praça João Pedreira, a narrow public square that runs between Avenida Getúlio Vargas. The streets along the sides and rear of the market are now closed to automotive traffic and serve as a dense, open-air market.

== History ==
Feira de Santana was a market town for much of its history, being the "leading emporium of the Bahian sertão", at the crossroads of cattle trade between the dry interior of Bahia and the city of Salvador. The need for a municipal market dated to the 19th century, as the Praça João Pedreira was used as a large open-air market. The primary purpose of the building was to organize and sanitize the meat trade for the safety of both workers and citizens. The municipality lacked the funds for a building, but decided on its construction in 1901. Loans in 1906 and 1913 facilitated the beginning and end of construction of the market. It was designed by Acciolly Ferreira da Silva, an engineer. The building was formally inaugurated on March 27, 1915, and was built at roughly the same time as similar markets of the region in São Felix, Lençóis, Barra, and Rio de Contas. Despite its size, the market was soon too crowded for its original purpose by the mid-20th century.

The Municipal Market was transformed into a folk art market by the municipality of Feira de Santana, reopening in 1980. It was renovated again in 1989 to improve the floors, roofs, toilets, electrical, and sanitation systems. It is now surrounded by a dense, open-air markets on three sides.

== Structure ==
The Municipal Market was built in an Eclectic style, combining both Neoclassical and Gothic revival elements. The market faces a narrow public square in the central area of Feira de Santana. The market has a rectangular floor plan, consists of a single floor, and covers 2,562 square metres (27,580 ft^{2}). It is in close alignment to streets on all four sides, only narrowly recessed from the street, and now surrounded by a metal fence. It consists of a large central area with access to all four streets around the market. The four facades of the building are divided by pilasters that support a cornice. The cornice is fitted with an ornate metalwork grille along the length of the building. Like the Municipal Market of São Félix, each pilaster is surmounted by an ornamental ceramic jar.

The market is surrounded by a series of high windows with high, pointed arches, resembling those of the Santa Casa de Misericórdia of Feira de Santana, built in the mid-19th century. There are twelve windows facing the plaza and rear of the building, and ten on the narrow sides of the building. The interior of the market has its original pillars and two panels of azulejos by the artist Juraci Dórea.

== Protected status ==
The Institute of Artistic and Cultural Heritage of Bahia listed the Municipal Market of Feira de Santana as a state heritage site in 1994.

== Access ==
The Municipal Market functions as a public market and is open to the public.
