= São Félix, Bahia =

São Félix
- Municipality
- Municipality of São Félix
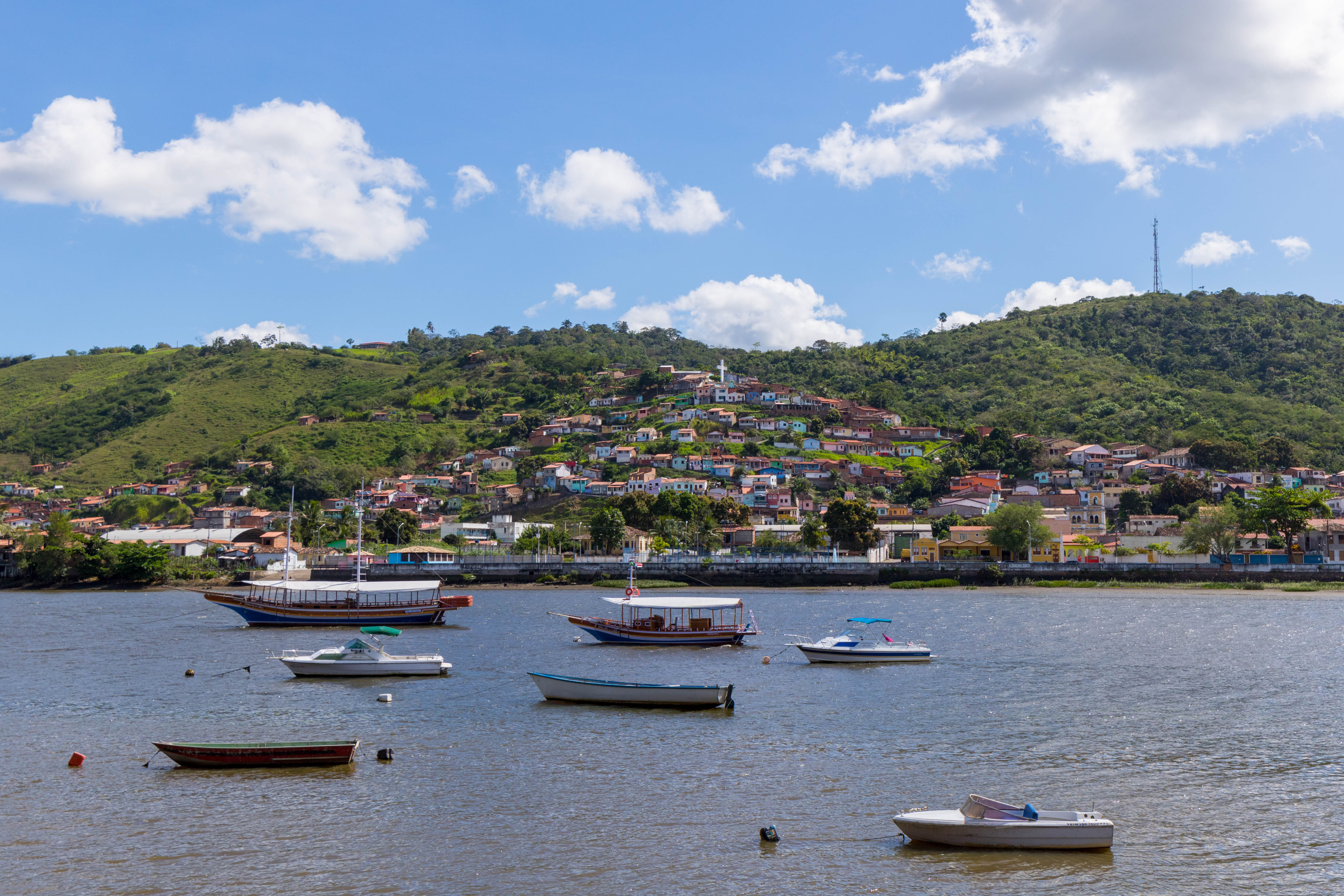
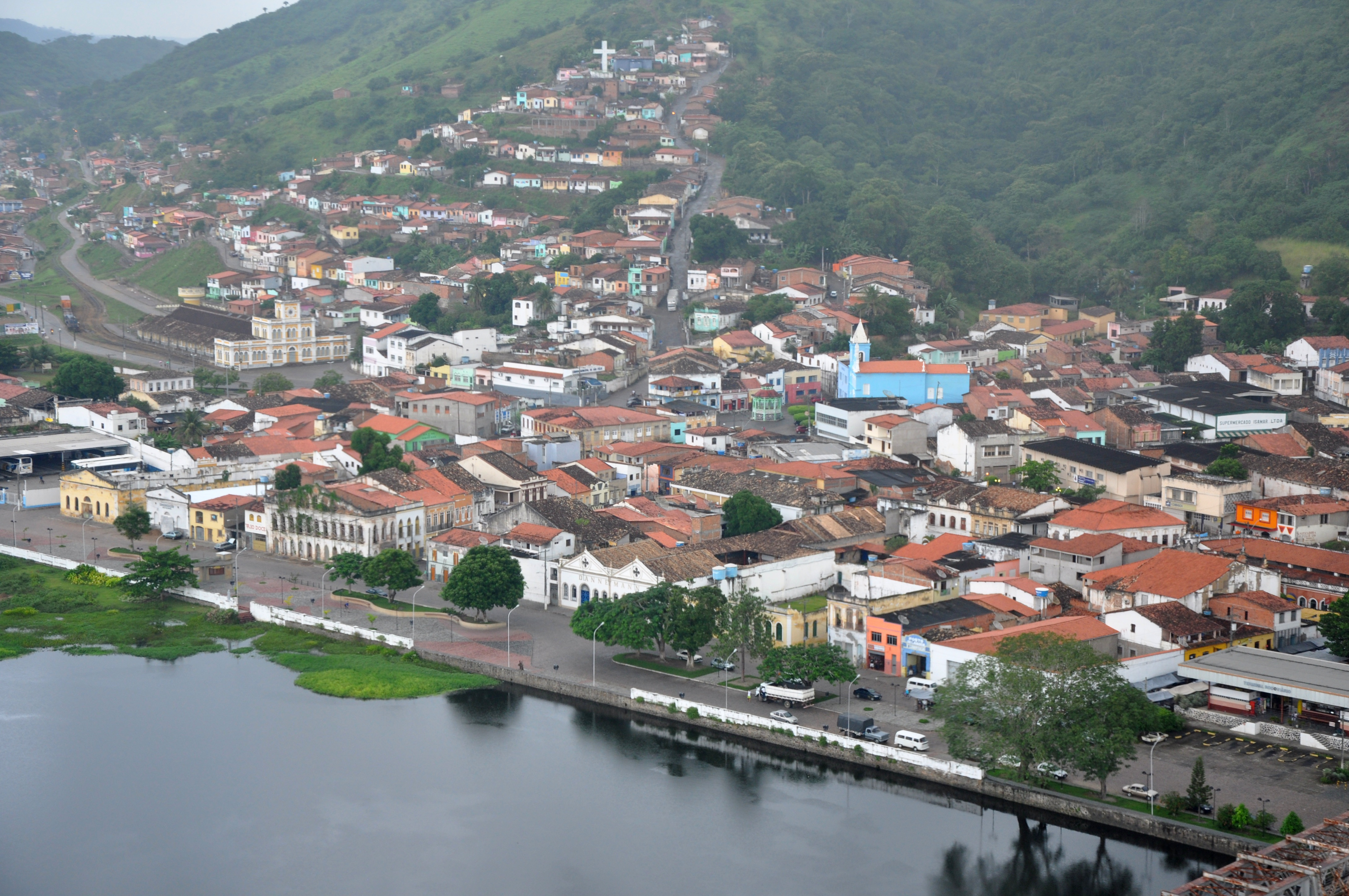
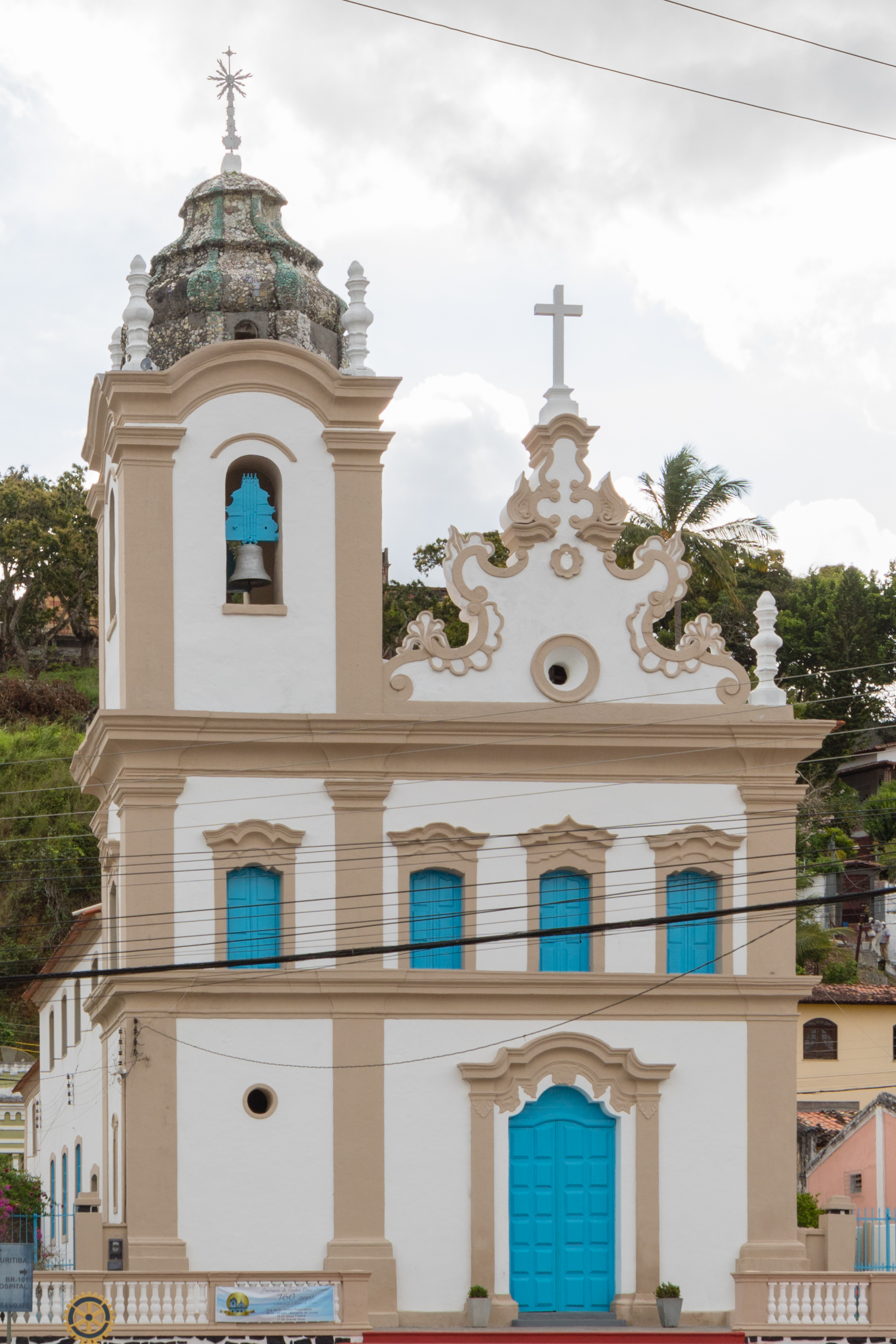
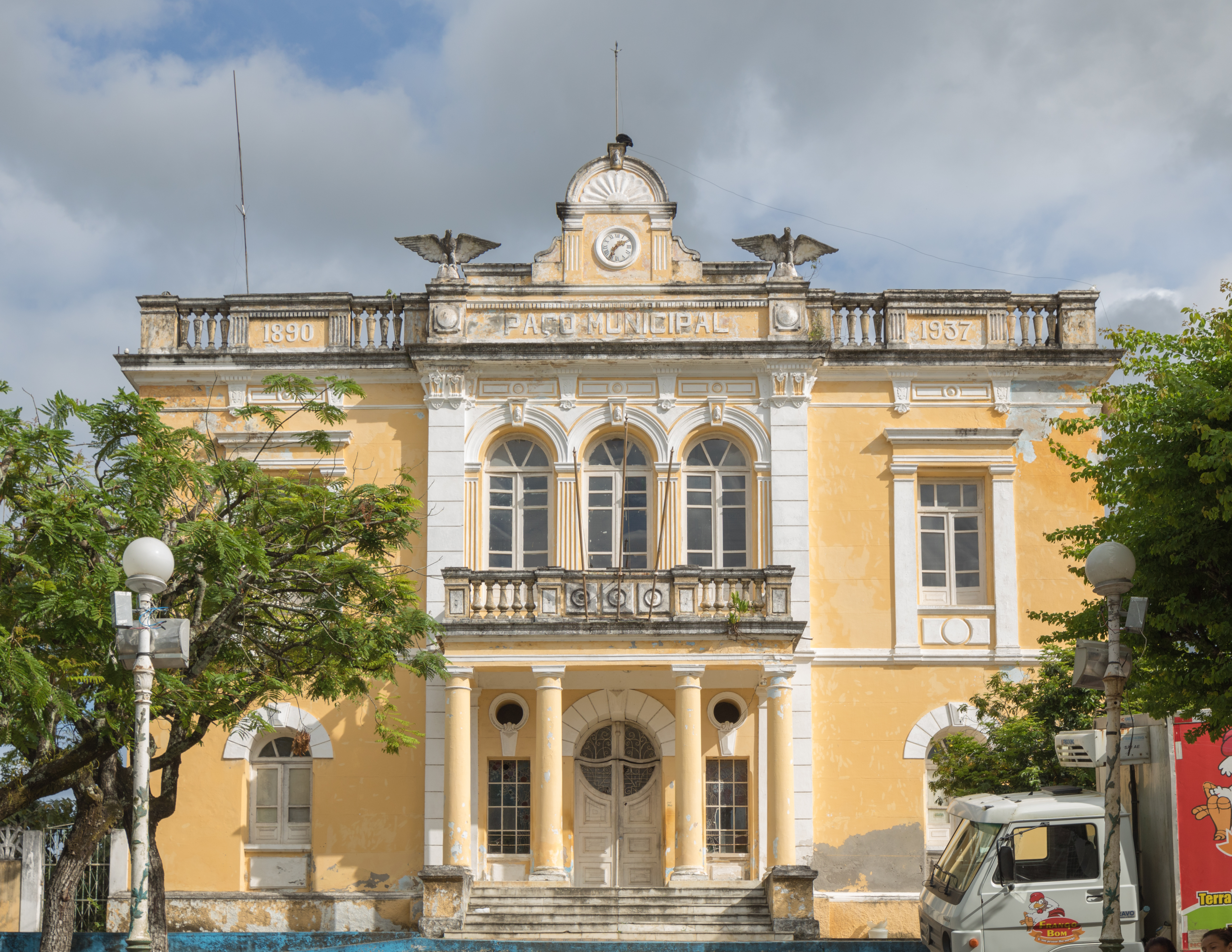
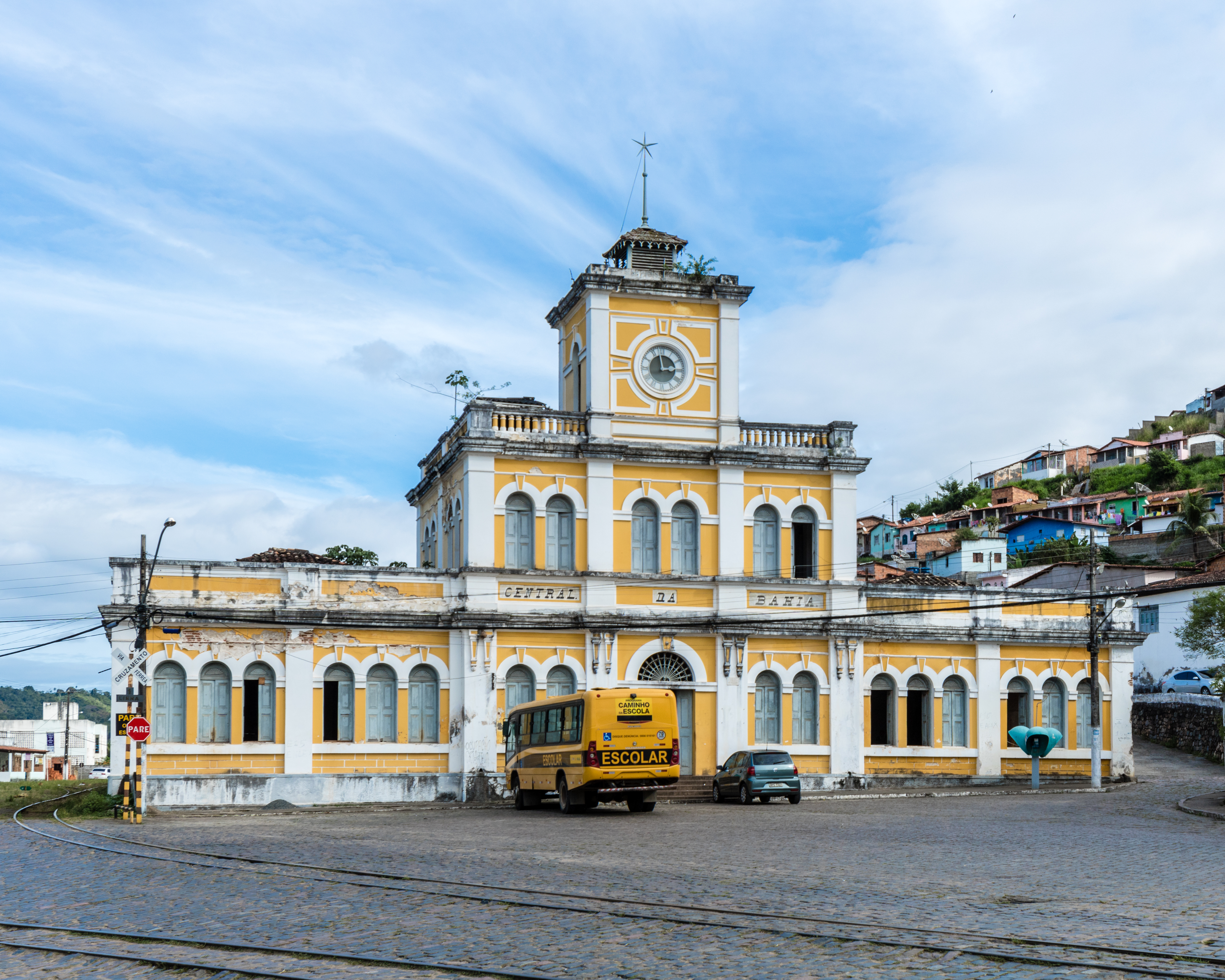
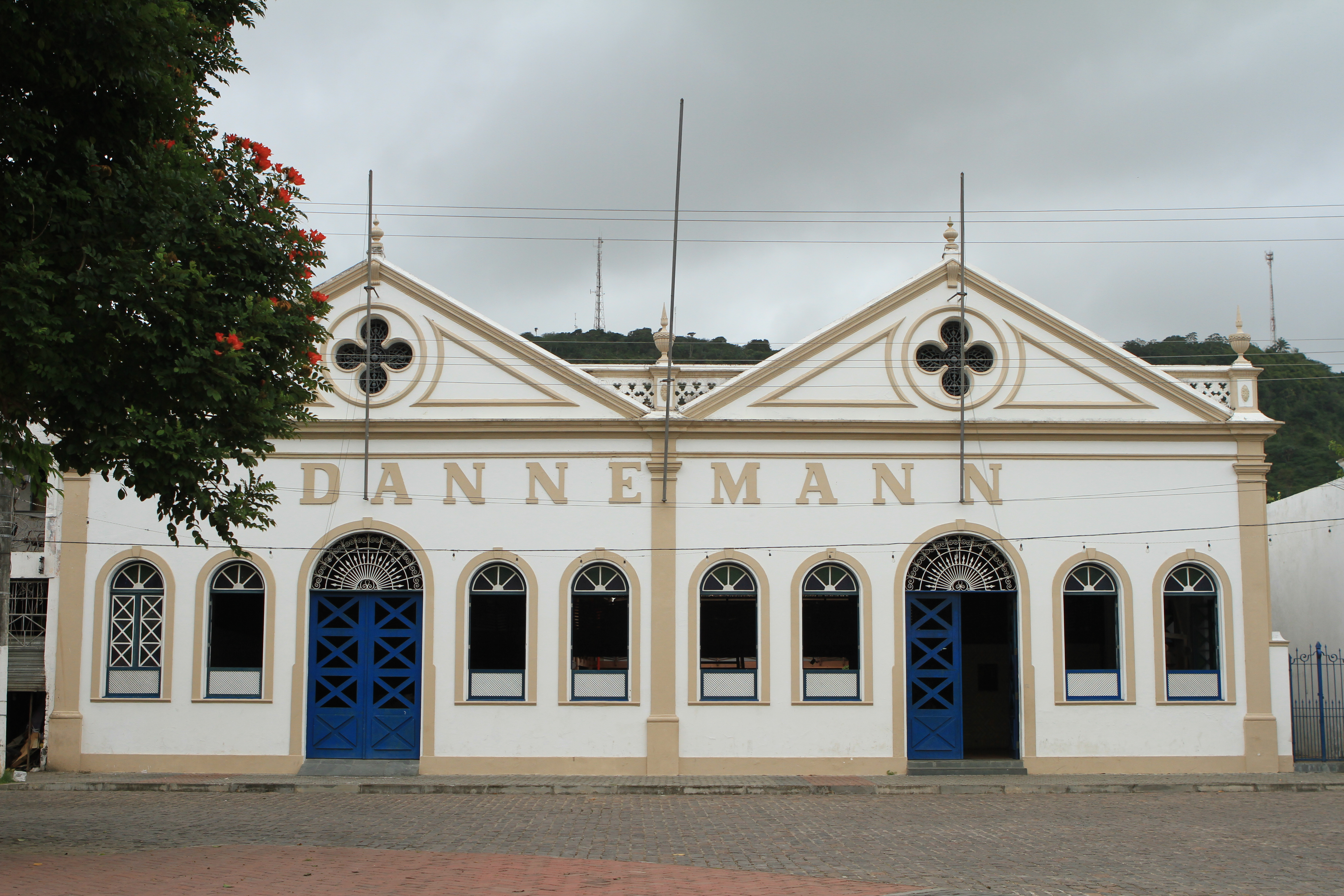
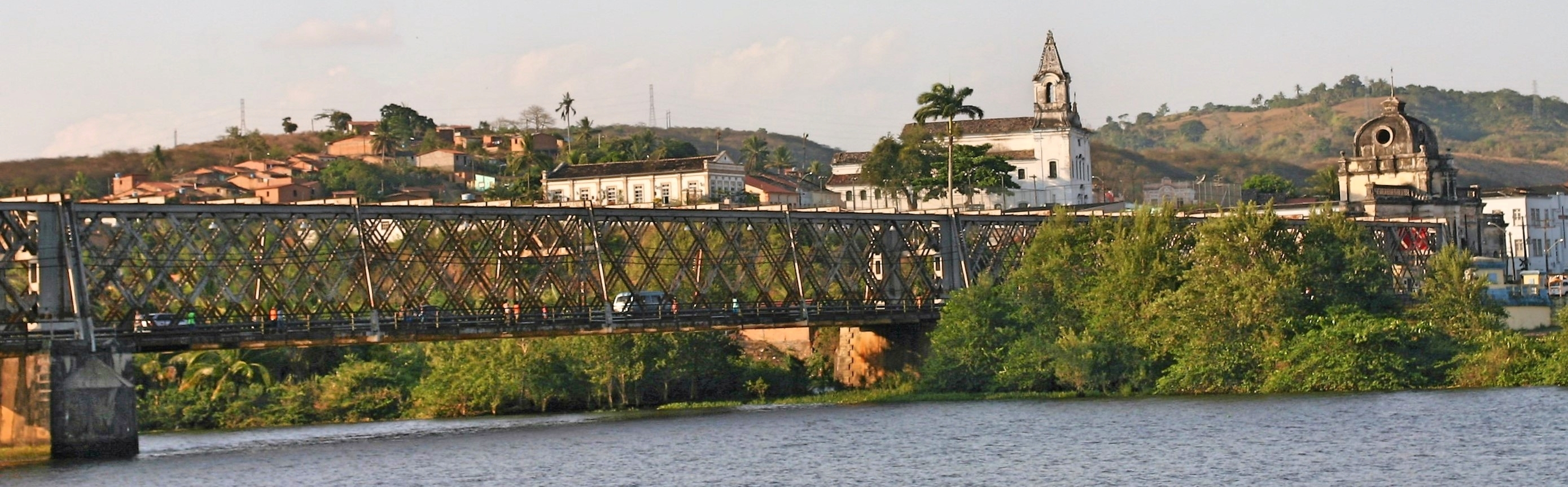

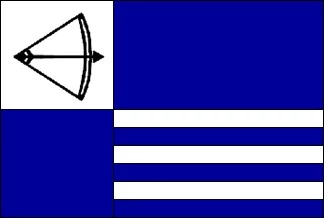
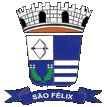
- Flag Coat of arms

- Location in Bahia
- Coordinates: 12°36′24.91″S 38°58′9.82″W
- Country: Brazil
- Region: Northeast
- State: Bahia

Government
  - Mayor: Alex Sandro Aleluia de Brito (UNIÃO)

Area
  - Total: 103.226 km^{2} (39.856 sq mi)

Population (2020)
  - Total: 14,762
  - Density: 143.01/km^{2} (370.39/sq mi)
- Demonym: são-felista
- Time zone: UTC−3 (BRT)
- HDI (2010): 0.639 – medium
- Website: saofelix.ba.gov.br

National Historic Heritage of Brazil
- Designated: 2012
- Reference no.: 1286

São Félix (Brazilian Portuguese: [ˈsɐ̃w̃ ˈfɛliks]) is a municipality in Bahia, Brazil. The municipality has a population of 14,762 with a population density of 142 inhabitants per square kilometer. It is located 110 km (68 mi) from the state capital of Bahia, Salvador.

São Félix directly faces Cachoeira across the Paraguaçu River; it also borders Muritiba, Maragogipe, Cruz das Almas, São Felipe, and Governador Mangabeira.

== History ==
São Félix has its origin in a Tupinamba village. In 1534, the Tupinambá village had about 20 huts and a population of approximately two hundred. The Portuguese took the land for the timber trade and to establish sugar cane plantations. Their attempts to enslave the Tupinamba population was unsuccessful and Mem de Sá, Governor-General of the Portuguese colony of Brazil from 1557 to 1572, expelled them from the region. Slaves were brought from Africa to Bahia beginning in 1549, and to Sao Felix and Cachoeira in 1615.

Tobacco production fueled the economy of São Félix from the eighteenth century to the first half of the nineteenth century. Its waterfront was lined with warehouses and three large cigar factories. São Félix became the largest producers of cigars in Brazil. Noted brands were Costa Penna, Dannemanm e Cia, and Simas Cardoso. The Companhia Central da Bahia--Imperial Central Railway Company Limited constructed a 25 kilometres (16 mi) extension from Feira de Santana to Cachoeira and São Félix in 1874. The engineers Frederico Merei and Affonso Glycerio da Cunha Maciel planned and supervise a railroad bridge between the Cachoeira and São Félix, which was inaugurated on July 7, 1885. Pedro II of Brazil allowed his name on the bridge, which was named the Dom Pedro II Bridge, and the Imperial Arms were placed on a keystone of the bridge.

The first parish church in São Félix was established in 1838 under the name of Nossa Senhora do Desterro do Outeiro Redondo. In 1857 the parish was renamed Senhor Deus Menino de São Félix. Luis Xavier Leal founded the Colégio São Félix in 1884 in the building that now houses the Municipal Market (Mercado Municipal) of São Félix. São Félix was separated from Cachoeira and became an independent municipality in 1889. It was elevated to the level of city in 1890 under the name of São Félix do Paraguaçú. The name was shorted to São Félix in 1931.

== Historic structures ==
São Félix is home to numerous colonial-period historic structures, some designated as Bahian state monuments. The protected Urban and Landscape Complex of the City of São Félix was established by the federal government in 1989.

- Saint Felix Church (Igreja do Senhor São Félix)
- Parish Church of the Infant Jesus (Igreja Matriz do Deus Menino)
- Municipal Market of São Félix (Mercado Municipal de São Félix)
- Town Hall of São Félix (Paço Municipal de São Félix)
- Terreiro Ilê Axé Ogunjá
- Terreiro Raiz de Ayrá
- Antiga Casa dos Hansen Bahia na Fazenda Santa Bárbara, the house of the artist Hansen Bahia

== See also ==
- List of municipalities in Bahia
