= Municipal Market of São Félix =

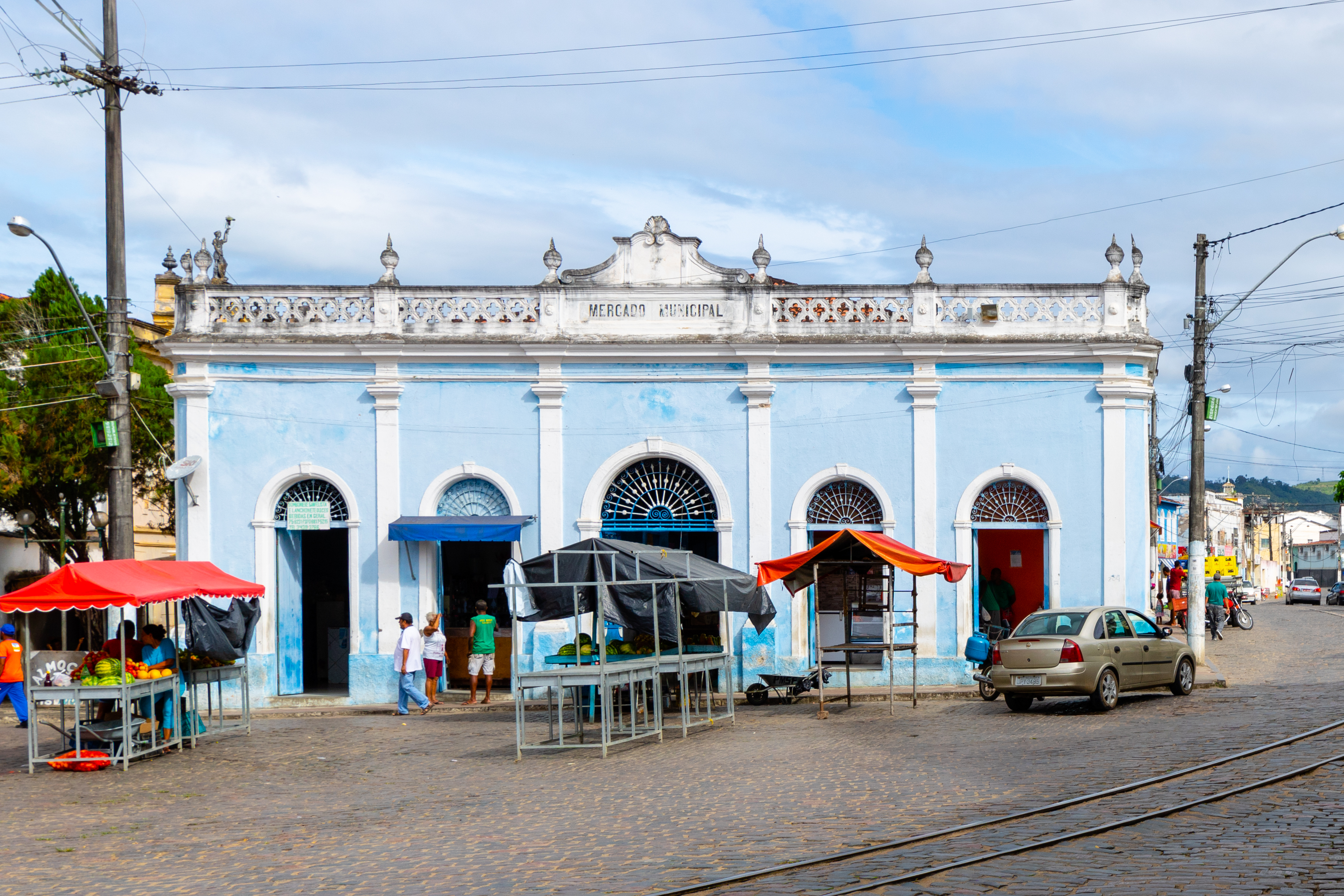
- Municipal Market of São Félix, São Félix, Bahia

- Location within Brazil

General information
- Location: São Félix, Bahia, Brazil
- Coordinates: 12.60623°S 38.969294°W
- Inaugurated: 1902

Technical details
- Floor count: 1
- Floor area: 784 square metres (8,440 ft^{2})

The Municipal Market of São Félix (Portuguese: Mercado Municipal de São Félix) is a public market in São Félix, Bahia, Brazil. The building is protected as a historic structure by the state of Bahia. An open-air market takes place in front of the market on Thursday, Friday, and Saturday.

== Structure ==
The Municipal Market was built in the Neoclassical style and occupies a full block within the Historic Center of São Félix. The market spans from the Dom Pedro II Bridge (Ponte Dom Pedro II) to Rua 20 de Dezembro, a narrow avenue. The market faces the Town Hall of São Félix and its associated buildings across Rua J.J. Seabra. Its construction began in 1902, in the same period as the municipal markets of Lençóis, Feira de Santana, and Rio de Contas; all were built in the same style. The market was renovated between 1931 and 1935, and subsequently between 1968 and 1969.

The market has a trapezoidal floor plan, consists of a single floor, and covers 784 square metres (8,440 ft^{2}). It consists of a large central area with access to all four streets around the market. The four facades of the building are divided by pilasters that support a cornice. Each pilaster is surmounted by a ceramic jar.

== Protected status ==
The Municipal Market is a protected structure by the Bahian Institute of Artistic Culture and Heritage (Instituto do Patrimônio Artístico e Cultural da Bahia) under Decree no. 9993/06 of 2006.

== Access ==
The Municipal Market functions as a public market and is open to the public.
