= Church of Our Lady of Santana (Rio de Contas) =

18th-century church in Bahia, Brazil

- Capela de São Lázaro
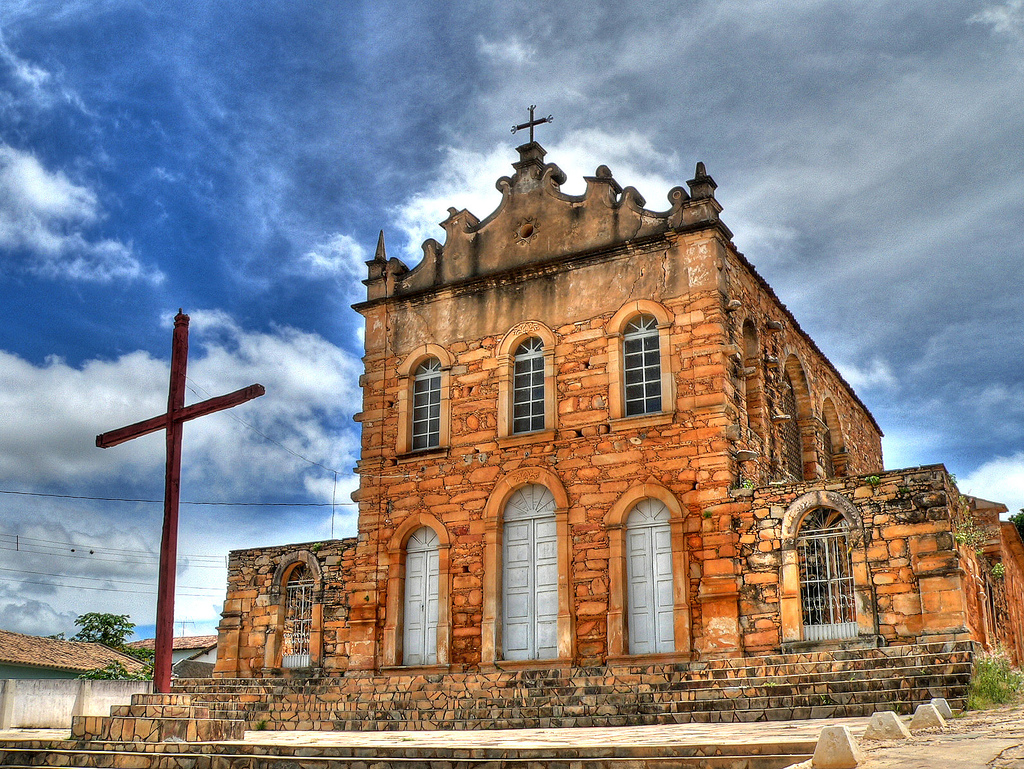
- Church of Our Lady of Santana, Rio de Contas, Bahia

- Location of the Church of Our Lady of Santana in Brazil

Religion
- Affiliation: Catholic
- Rite: Roman
- Ownership: Roman Catholic Archdiocese of São Salvador da Bahia
- Patron: Saint Anne

Location
- Municipality: Rio de Contas
- State: Bahia
- Country: Brazil
- Interactive map of Church of Our Lady of Santana
- Coordinates: 13.583454°S 41.813765°W

Architecture
- Style: Baroque
- Established: 1700s

Specifications
- Direction of façade: North
- Interior area: 420 square metres (4,500 ft^{2})

National Historic Heritage of Brazil
- Designated: 1958
- Reference no.: 446

The Church of Our Lady of Santana (Portuguese: Igreja de Nossa Senhora Santana) is an 18th-century church in Rio de Contas, Bahia, Brazil. It is dedicated to Saint Anne. It dates to the first half of the 18th century, but construction on the structure ended around 1850s. It left the church with a unique appearance of red stone masonry without plaster on the exterior or interior. The façade of the church collapsed in the 1940s due to strong rain, and was reconstructed 6.2 metres (20 ft) back from the original to allow for the placement of supports. The church covers 420 square metres (4,500 ft^{2}) and is set back from the road and the nearby houses. It has a stone church stair that leads to a broad churchyard. The church is part of the Historic Center of Rio de Contas. The church is listed as a federal historic structure as part of the National Institute of Historic and Artistic Heritage.

== History ==
Construction on the Church of Our Lady of Santana began in the early 18th century. Diamonds were discovered in Mucugê to the northeast of Rio de Contas in 1844. The local population exited Rio de Contas to work in the mines of Mucugê and construction of the church ended around 1850. The roof collapsed during strong rains in 1914, and the façade in the 1940s. Stones from the church, largely in ruins, were used to construct nearby houses. The roof was replaced in 1960 as part of a reconstruction of the church. Flooring was added to the church in the same year, as well as a roof on one of the sacristies.

== Location ==
The Church of Our Lady of Santana is located on Praça Duque de Caxias, formerly known as Largo de Santana. The church is a short distance from the city center on the road to the municipality of Livramento de Nossa Senhora.

== Structure ==
The Church of Our Lady of Santana has three central arched portals with three choir windows of a similar design above. The façade is surmounted by a baroque-style pediment with volutes and pinnacles. The stone masonry above the choir windows and pediment are the only parts of the church that have been plastered.

The plan of the church is unusual in Bahia: it consists of a rectangle with three naves and a chancel that with access to lateral sacristies via high arches. The side naves were meant to be surmounted by galleries; the work was never finished. The windows at the choir level are unusually high.

== Protected status ==
The Church of Our Lady of Santana was listed as a protected historic site by the National Institute of Historic and Artistic Heritage in 1958 under inscription number 446. It was listed under the name "Ruins of the Church of Our Lady of Santana" (Ruínas da Igreja de Santana) due to the condition of the church in the mid-20th century.

== Access ==
The church is open to the public and may be visited.
