= Town Hall of Feira de Santana =

- Paço Municipal, formerly the Casa de Câmara e Cadeia
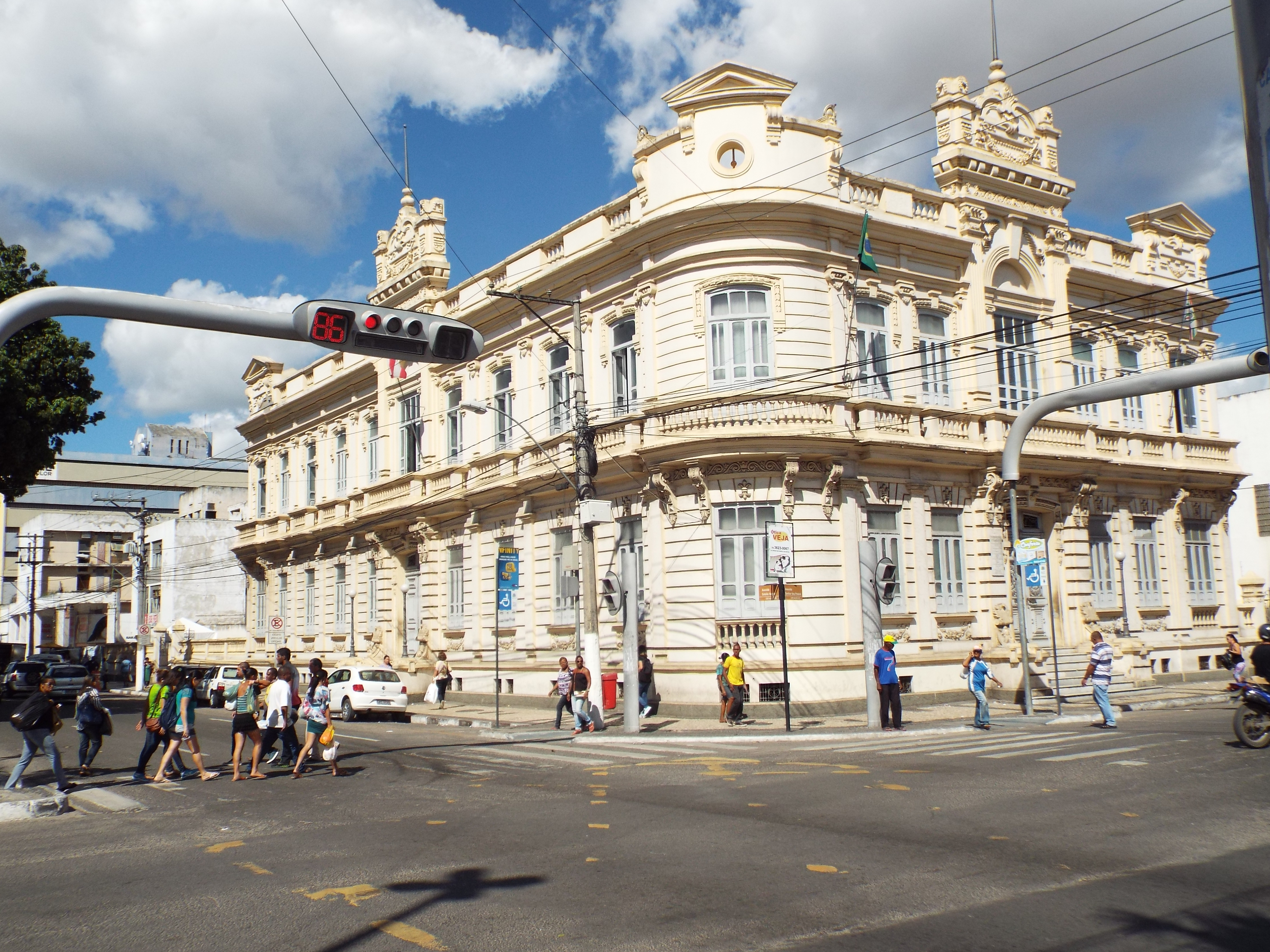
- Town Hall of Feira de Santana, Feira de Santana, Bahia, Brazil
- Interactive map of the Town Hall of Feira de Santana area

General information
- Type: town hall
- Location: Avenida Senhor dos Passos, s/n, Feira de Santana, Bahia, Brazil
- Coordinates: 12.255566000750836°S 38.96516428696809°W
- Groundbreaking: 1921
- Inaugurated: 1926

Height
- Architectural: Acciolly Ferreira da Silva

Technical details
- Floor count: 2
- Floor area: 1,400 square metres (15,000 ft^{2})

Design and construction
- Engineer: Acciolly Ferreira da Silva

The Town Hall of Feira de Santana (Portuguese: Paço Municipal de Feira de Santana), officially known as The Maria Quitéria Town Hall (Portuguese: Paço Municipal Maria Quitéria), is a 20th-century municipal building in Feira de Santana, Bahia, Brazil. It was built in the eclecticism style by the engineer Acciolly Ferreira da Silva, who also designed the Municipal Market of Feira de Santana. The town hall was renamed in honor of Maria Quitéria (1792-1853), a heroine of the Brazilian War of Independence.

== Location ==
The Town Hall is located on the corner of Avenida Senhor dos Passos and Avenida Getúlio Vargas, a large boulevard, in the city center. The Town Hall opens to Avenida Getúlio Vargas and faces the neo-Gothic Church of Our Lord of the Stations (Igreja Senhor dos Passos). The Municipal Market of Feira de Santana sits a block west of the town hall and church. The historic buildings of the central district of Feira de Santana have been decharacterized by the urbanization and dense commercialization of the city.

== History ==
Feira de Santana was established in 1832 after its separation from the municipality of Cachoeira in 1832. The city council rented a small building to serve as a town hall in 1880. The expansion of municipal services necessitated the purchase of another building in 1906. The City Council authorized the construction of a new city hall on September 11, 1920. The council placed a foundation stone the following year, and the building was inaugurated in 1926. It was commission by Bernardino da Silva Bahia, intendante, or mayor of the municipality, and designed by the engineer Acciolly Ferreira da Silva. The City Hall building was inaugurated in 1926 under intendente Arnold Ferreira da Silva. Its construction cost over 400 contos de réis (4000:000$000), fully 75% of the budget for public works in Feira de Santana between 1921 and 1927.

The Town Hall initially housed the municipal government, city council, public library, and hygiene office (posto de higiene). It now houses the offices of the mayor and secretaries of agriculture, environment, natural resources, and social government.

== Structure ==
The Town Hall was built in an eclectic style similar to many buildings of the same period in Feira de Santana. The building has a rectangular floor plan, two stories with a cellar, and covers 1,400 square metres (15,000 ft^{2}). It follows a simplified plan of Bahian town halls of the Portuguese colonial era, such as those in Jaguaripe, Cachoeira, and those later constructed in the sertão of Bahia.

The façades are rounded and have ornate decorative elements of the late Neoclassical style in Brazil. Balconets run across the length of the upper floor.

== Interior ==
The interior of the town hall maintains much of its original structure. The lower floor has small rooms for city departments, and the upper floor has large meeting rooms and private offices of the prefeitura (mayor). It retains its original floors, ceilings, partitions, window frames, and staircases. The walls and ceilings have paintings and friezes typical of the early 20th century. The formal entrance has a grand staircase in stone. The secondary entrance opens to a wooden, curved staircase, original to the building, with balusters and curved banister in the same material. The main hall (salão nobre) on the upper floor has plaster decoration on the length of its walls, paintings of the mayors of the municipality, and stucco medallions over the doorways. Some of its original furnishing remains, and includes a large wooden table, wooden chairs, sofas, and hat racks.

== Protected status ==
The Institute of Artistic and Cultural Heritage of Bahia listed the Town Hall of Feira de Santana as a state heritage site in 2004.

== Access ==
The Town Hall is open to the public and may be visited.
