= Municipal Public Archive of Feira de Santana =

- Arquivo Público Municipal de Feira de Santana
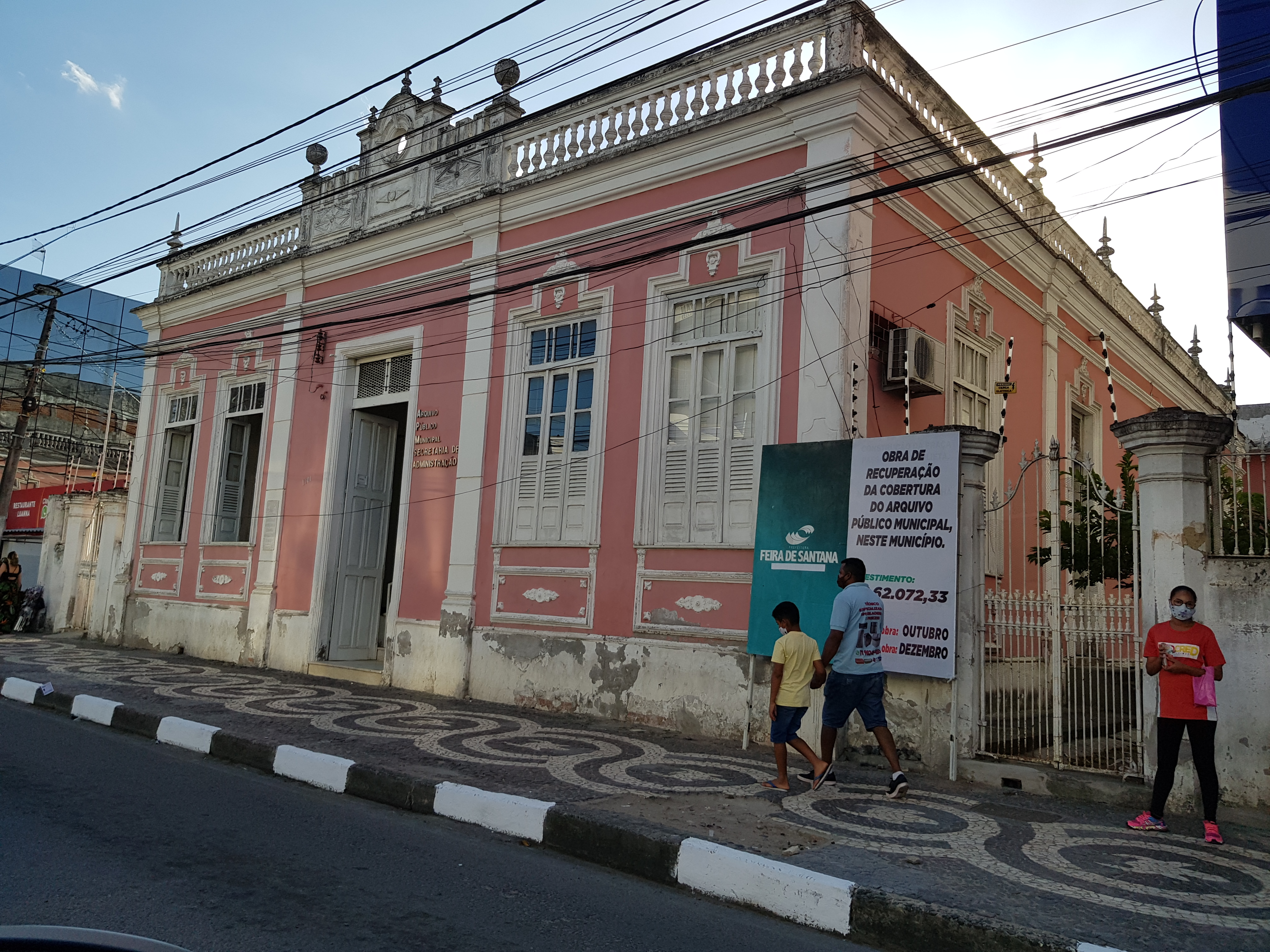
- Municipal Public Archive of Feira de Santana, Feira de Santana, Bahia

- Location within Brazil

General information
- Location: nº 1101, Avenida Senhor dos Passos, Feira de Santana, Bahia, Feira de Santana, Bahia, Brazil
- Coordinates: 12.254461°S 38.965546°W
- Inaugurated: 1917

Technical details
- Floor count: 1

The Municipal Public Archive of Feira de Santana (Portuguese: Arquivo Público Municipal de Feira de Santana) or (Portuguese: Prédio do Arquivo Público Municipal de Feira de Santana), is a former school and public archive in Feira de Santana, Bahia, Brazil. It is located within the Historic Center of Feira de Santana, was built in 1917, and inaugurated in 1918. The archive holds over 200,000 documents; its collection includes detailed records of the trade of enslaved Africans in the municipality. The building of the Municipal Public Archive of Feira de Santana was listed as a state heritage site by the Institute of Artistic and Cultural Heritage of Bahia in 1994.

== History ==
The Municipal Public Archive was built in 1917 and inaugurated the following year as Escola João Florêncio. It was built under the direction of Agostinho Fróes da Motta, the intendente, or mayor of the municipality. It followed the establishment of the first school in Feira de Santana, the Escola Jose Joaquim Seabra, built under Colonel Bernardino Silva Bahia. The construction of Escola João Florêncio was followed by that of Escola Maria Quitéria, which still functions as a school in the municipality. The schools were characterized by "sumptuous" architectural design to demonstrate the modernity of Feira de Santana.

Escola João Florêncio was renovated to house the Municipal Public Archive in the mid-20th century. Annexes were added to the building in the same period in a contemporary style but are in harmony with the original construction. It has spaces to house collections, a reception area, and two small exhibition rooms. The building is now the oldest public educational building in the Feira de Santana.

== Structure ==
The Municipal Public Archive has a single floor and was built in close alignment to the street. It was built in an Eclectic style common to other buildings in Feira de Santana of the period. It has a portal at center, with two windows to the left and two to the right.

== Collections ==
The archive houses over 1,000 books and 200,000 documents. Noted parts of its collection are documents dating to the formation of Feira de Santana, deeds from the late 19th century, and plans for architectural projects of public buildings from 1916 to 2002. The archive holds documents related to the author Georgina Erismann, the historian Monsignor Renato de Andrade Galvão (1918-1995), and Maria Quitéria (1792-1853), a Brazilian independence figure. Of special note are detailed records of the purchase and sale of enslaved Africans in the municipality.

== Protected status ==
The Institute of Artistic and Cultural Heritage of Bahia listed the building of the Municipal Public Archive of Feira de Santana as a state heritage site in 1994.

== Access ==
The archive is open to the public and may be visited.
