= Bandstand at Bernardino Bahia Square =

Bandstand in Feira de Santana, Brazil

- Coreto da Praça Bernardino Bahia
- Location within Brazil

General information
- Location: Praça Bernardino Bahia, Feira de Santana, Bahia, Brazil, Feira de Santana, Bahia, Brazil
- Coordinates: 12.253955°S 38.965935°W

Technical details
- Floor count: 1
- Floor area: 77.5 square metres (834 ft^{2})

The Bandstand at Bernardino Bahia Square (Portuguese: Coreto da Praça Bernardino Bahia) is a historic bandstand in Feira de Santana, Bahia, Brazil. It is located within the Historic Center of Feira de Santana within Bernardino Bahia Square (Praça Bahia Square). The bandstand covers 77.5 square metres (834 ft^{2}) and was built by Colonel Bernardino Bahia in 1915. It is the first bandstand built in the city, and is one of three in Feira de Santana listed as a state heritage site by the Institute of Artistic and Cultural Heritage of Bahia in 1991.

== History ==
Little is known of the planning or construction of Bernardino Bahia Square or the bandstand. Records from the early 20th century indicate that the square had dense vegetation surrounded by buildings from the 19th century in both the traditional and eclectic style. The bandstand was built in the center of the square 1915 by the Colonel Bernardino Bahia, and was the first bandstand in Feira de Santana. The bandstand was greatly altered since its construction, but the only recorded renovation was in 2000. The Portuguese stonework that covered the square was replaced by concrete slabs, as were elements of the bandstand.

== Structure ==
The bandstand is a simple octagon-shaped structure with pillars supporting the roof. It covers 77.5 square metres (834 ft^{2}). All its elements are in metal, including the pillars and lambrequim. Its decorative elements and use of metal reflect architectural elements introduced to Brazil at the end of the 19th century. The use of metal in a roof was considered progressive at the time. The bandstand is accessed by a single staircase along the side, but it is not original to the structure. The bandstand is in a poor state of repair. It has been used as a makeshift bar for a long period of time, and its lower portion for storage. The Bandstand at Froes da Mota Plaza is in similar condition.

== Access ==
The bandstand is located within a public square but due to its use as a bar and poor state of repair, may not be accessed.
