= Joedson =

Brazilian footballer

Personal information
- Full name: Joedson Santos Almeida
- Date of birth: 18 January 1989 (age 37)
- Place of birth: Feira de Santana, Brazil
- Height: 1.82 m (6 ft 0 in)
- Position: Midfielder

Team information
- Current team: Floresta

Youth career
- 2003–2007: Vitória

Senior career*
Years	Team	Apps	(Gls)
2005–2007	Vitória		
2008–2009	Votoraty		
2009	Fluminense de Faira		
2009	Vitória		
2010	Fluminense de Faira	17	(3)
2010	Atlético Mineiro	3	(0)
2011	Sport Recife	0	(0)
2011	Corinthians B		
2012	Fluminense de Faira		
2012	Boa Esporte	1	(0)
2013	Oeste	5	(0)
2013	Arapongas	7	(1)
2013	Bahia de Feira	5	(0)
2013–2015	Grêmio Barueri	6	(0)
2015–2016	Pelotas		
2016	Itabaiana	4	(0)
2017	Ituano	6	(1)
2017–2018	URT	27	(0)
2018–2019	Avenida	12	(0)
2020	Uberlândia	9	(1)
2020–	Floresta	69	(4)
- * Club domestic league appearances and goals as of 9 July 2023

Joedson Almeida Santos (born 18 January 1989), better known as Joedson or Jô, is a Brazilian footballer who plays as a midfielder for Floresta.

== Career ==
Was the red-black cast of Bahia until 2007, when he was defending Votoraty of. There he remained until mid-2009, when he returned to Bahia, to play for Fluminense de Feira. Was still in Victoria at the end of the season but returned to Bahia Flu in 2010. On 24 August 2010, the player was acquired from the Roosters. On 3 January 2011, he signed a contract with Sport Recife.

== Career statistics ==
(Correct as of 16 October 2010)

Club	Season	State League		Brazilian Série A		Copa do Brasil		Copa Sudamericana		Total	
Club	Season	Apps	Goals	Apps	Goals	Apps	Goals	Apps	Goals	Apps	Goals
Fluminense	2010	17	3	-	-	-	-	-	-	17	3
Atlético Mineiro	2010	-	-	3	0	-	-	-	-	3	0
Total		17	3	3	0	-	-	-	-	20	3
