= Feira de Santana Airport =

Governador João Durval Carneiro Airport Aeroporto Governador João Durval Carneiro
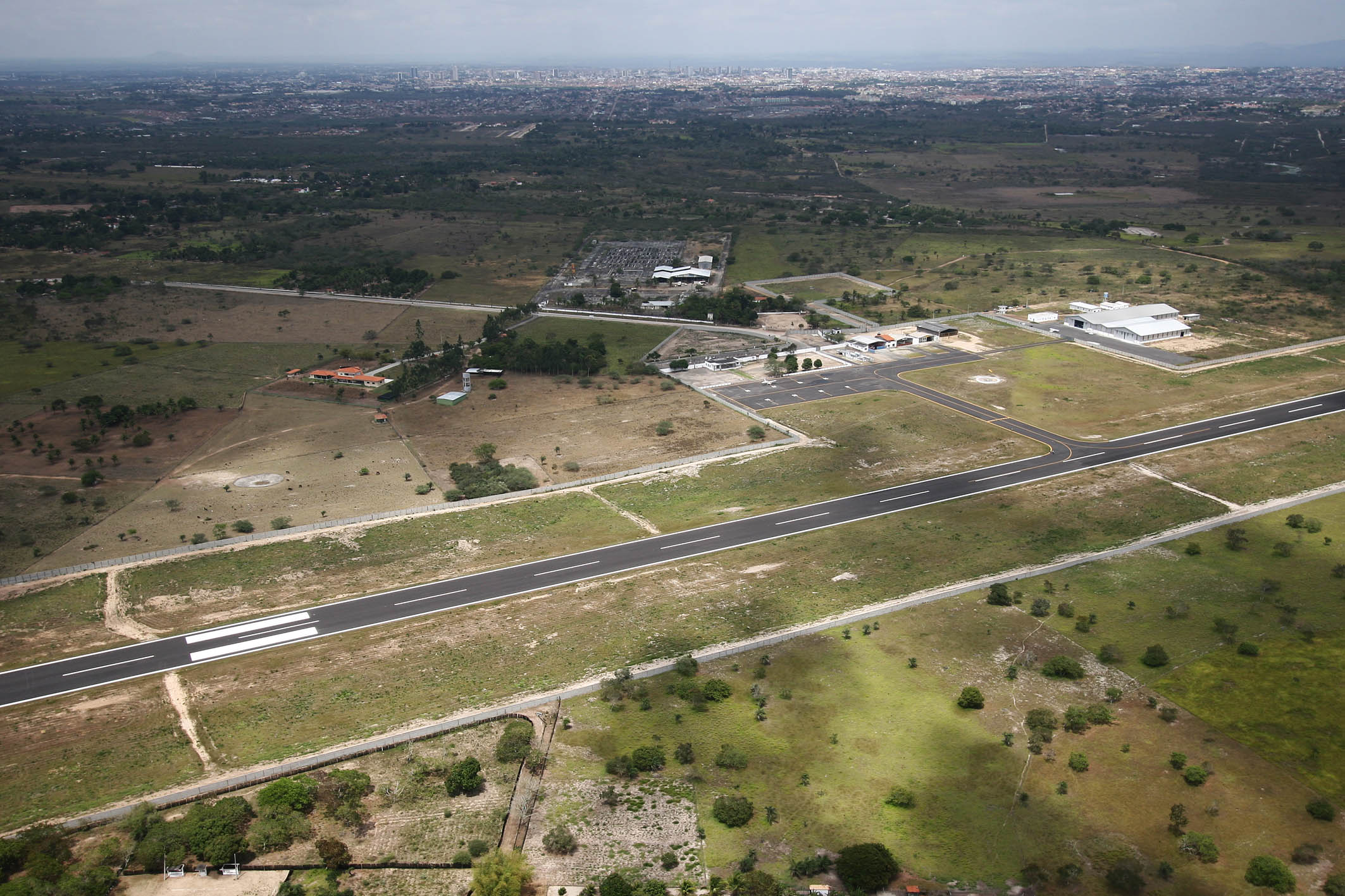
- IATA: FEC; ICAO: SDIY; LID: BA0013

Summary
- Airport type: Public
- Operator: FSA
- Serves: Feira de Santana
- Time zone: BRT (UTC−03:00)
- Elevation AMSL: 238 m (781 ft)
- Coordinates: 12°12′02″S 038°54′23″W

Map
- Location in Brazil

Runways
Direction	Length		Surface
Direction	m	ft	Surface
13/31	1,800	4,921	Asphalt
- Sources: ANAC, DECEA

Gov. João Durval Carneiro Airport (IATA: FEC, ICAO: SDIY) formerly SNJD, is the airport serving Feira de Santana, Brazil. It is named after a former Governor of the state of Bahia, born in 1929.

It is operated by the concessionary Aeroporto de Feira de Santana (FSA).

== History ==
The airport was commissioned in 1985 and since May 29, 2012 operated by the concessionary Aeroporto Feira de Santana formed by UTC Engineering and Sinart.

== Airlines and destinations ==
No scheduled flights operate at this airport.

== Access ==
The airport is located 12 km (7 mi) from downtown Feira de Santana.

== See also ==
- List of airports in Brazil
