= Hansen Bahia =

German-Brazilian illustrator and painter (1915–1978)

- Karl Heinz Hansen
- Born: Karl Heinz Hansen; April 19, 1915; Hamburg, Germany
- Died: June 28, 1978 (aged 63); São Paulo, Brazil
- Resting place: São Félix, Brazil
- Spouse: Ilse Carolina Stromier

Hansen Bahia, born Karl Heinz Hansen (Hamburg, Germany, 1915 – São Paulo, Brazil, 1978), was a German engraver, artist, and writer active in Brazil after 1950. He fought in World War II as a soldier, illustrated children's books after the war, and began working in woodcuts, his primary medium in the late 1940s. He traveled to Brazil in the 1950s, and worked with numerous artists and authors of Salvador, Bahia in the period. He worked in Germany, Ethiopia, and Colombia in the 1960s, and returned to Brazil in 1966. He legally changed his name to Hansen Bahia in 1966. Hansen Bahia moved to the interior of the Brazilian state of Bahia in 1975, and purchased a historic farm with his wife, Ilsa. The couple donated his art, residence, and personal effects to the city of Cachoeira, Bahia; they are housed and displayed in the Hansen Bahia Foundation in Cachoeira.

== Early life ==
Hansen Bahia spent his childhood in Hamburg, where he studied painting from 1930 to 1933. He then worked in Italy as an ice cream vendor and artist in a traveling circus. Hansen Bahia served as a seaman for the German Reichsmarine (Reich Navy) from 1935 to 1936, then was employed in the fire brigade. He fought in World War II as a soldier in the German Army until 1945, and was at the Oder front at the end of the war.

Hansen Bahia worked as an illustrator of children's books during the war, an experience that formed the basis of his later artistic work. After the end of World War II he painted images of the destroyed city of Hamburg and illustrated self-written fairy tales. An exhibition of his work on children's books followed. He created his first woodcut series, Totentanz and Christ and Thomas, between 1946 and 1947.

== Emigration to Brazil ==
Hansen Bahia emigrated to Brazil in 1950 via Norway and England, and worked for Companhia Melhoramentos in São Paulo. He devoted his career entirely to art after arriving in Brazil, and had his first exhibition of woodcuts at the Museu de Arte de São Paulo under the sponsorship of Pietro Maria Bo Bardi, the husband of the architect Lina Bo Bardi.

1955 was to be a decisive year for Hansen Bahia. He traveled to Salvador da Bahia via an invitation of the art magazine Habitat. He had an exhibition in Bahia, and quit his publishing job to work as a freelance artist. He set up a studio on the beach at Amaralina in Salvador and created a large number of woodcut series and murals for ecclesiastical and secular buildings between 1956 and 1958. He illustrated Flor de São Miguel by Jorge Amado (1912–2001) and Vinicius de Moraes (1913–1980) in 1957. He illustrated Navio Negreiro by Castro Alves (1847–1871) in the following year.

== Return to Germany and work in Ethiopia ==
Hansen returned to Germany in 1959 and founded a summer school for woodcut arts at his workshop at the Tittmoning Castle in Traunstein in 1960. He continued his work on Brazilian themes using large-format woodcuts and published eight books and portfolios. Hansen remained in Bavaria for only four years.

Hansen assumed a professorship at the School of Fine Arts in Addis Ababa, Ethiopia. The Emperor Haile Selassie put great emphasis on the art school, providing funding, sending students abroad, and hiring foreign instructors. Hansen Bahia was hired to focus on printmaking; he worked at the school with the sculptor Herbert Seiler, the art historian Wendy Kindred, and the paintor Vincenzo Fumo. Hansen Bahia left Ethiopia for Brazil in 1966.

== Later life and death ==
Hansen returned to Salvador and was naturalized as a Brazilian citizen in 1966, adopting the artistic name "Hansen Bahia". He took over the chair for graphics at the Federal University of Bahia in 1967, and also taught at the University of Bogotá, Colombia, and the Escola de Belas Artes in Belo Horizonte. He built a new studio house on the beach in Itapoã (neighborhood), Bahia

Hansen moved to São Félix, in the interior of Bahia, in 1975. He and his wife purchased a historic property in ruins, the Santa Bárbara Farm, the former Chácara Casa Branca, to renovate into a residence and atelier. Hansen Bahia donated his artistic production in a will in 1976 to the city of Cachoeira, Bahia.^{A} The Hansen Bahia Foundation was created to house and display his woodcuts, matrices, books, paintings, presses and work tools. Hansen Bahia died in São Paulo in 1978, and his ashes were interred at the Santa Bárbara Farm in São Félix.

== Personal life ==
Karl Heinz Hansen was married three times. With his second wife, he had two children: Irmie and Vitório. When he returned to Germany, Karl divorced his second wife by court order. In 1971, he married the artist Ilse Carolina Stromier, 19 years younger than him, in a chapel in Germany. Ilse had been his student at the studio in Tittmoning.

Ilse died five years after Karl, on June 5, 1983, from cirrhosis caused by drinking. Her ashes were buried together with Karl's at the Santa Bárbara Farm. After Ilse's death, the farm, all the furniture and the couple's work tools were incorporated into the Hansen Bahia Foundation.

== Footnote ==
A. Cachoeira and São Félix are sister cities and cultural centers in the Bahian Recôncavo region separated by the Paraguaçu River, roughly 110 kilometres (68 mi) from the state capital of Salvador. Hansen Bahia and Ilse's farm and work location are located in São Félix; the Hansen Bahia Foundation is located in Cachoeira.
