= Church of Our Lady of Remedies (Feira de Santana) =

Church in Feira de Santana, Brazil

- Capela de Nossa Senhora dos Remédios
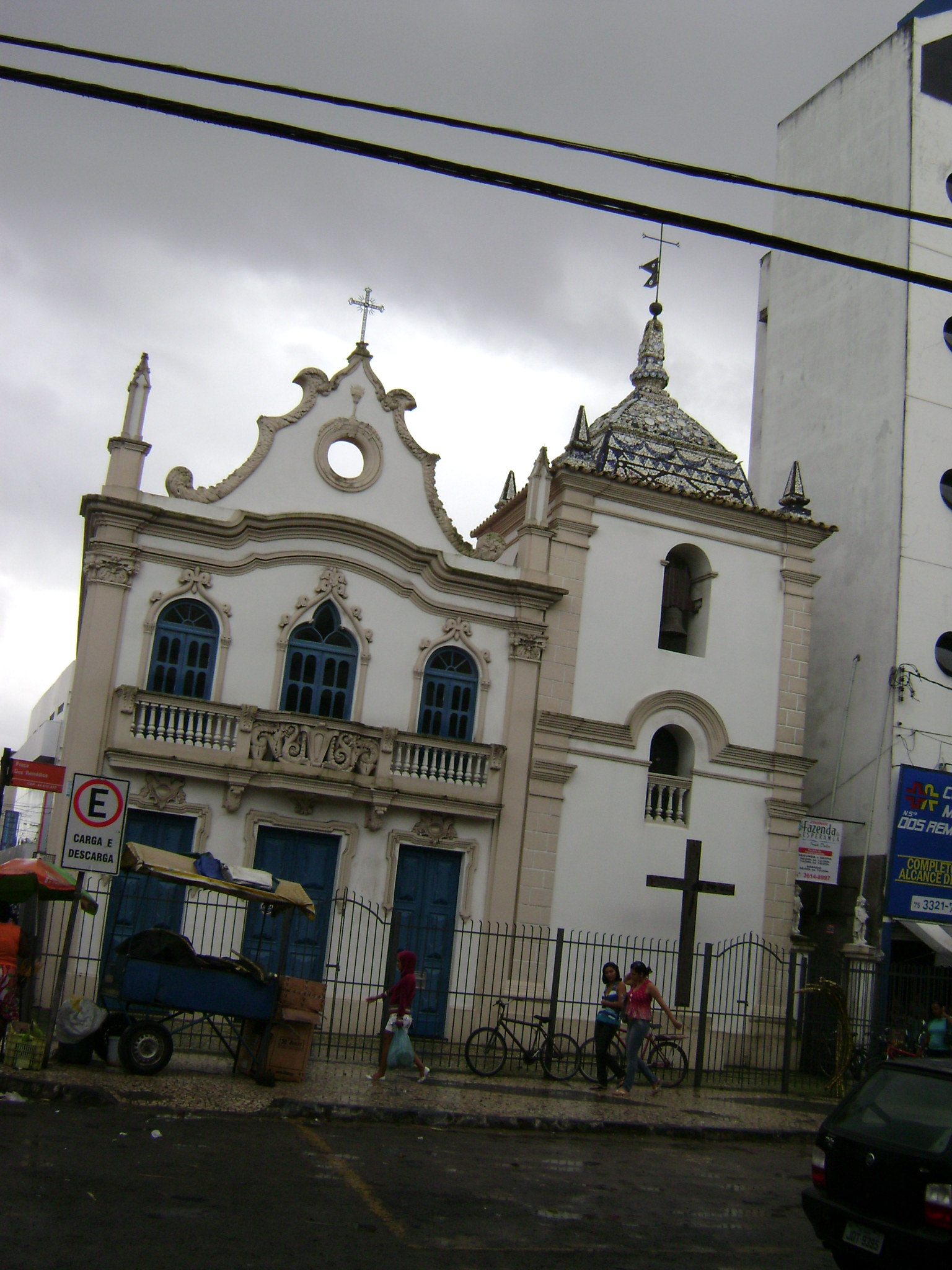
- Façade of the Church of Our Lady of Remedies

- Location of the Church of Our Lady of Remedies in Brazil

Religion
- Affiliation: Catholic
- Rite: Roman
- Patron: Our Lady of Remedies

Location
- Municipality: Feira de Santana
- State: Bahia
- Country: Brazil
- Interactive map of Church of Our Lady of Remedies
- Coordinates: 12.252661°S 38.966727°W

Architecture
- Type: Baroque
- Established: 1700
- Interior area: 625 square metres (6,730 ft^{2})

The Church of Our Lady of Remedies (Portuguese: Igreja de Nossa Senhora dos Remédios), or Chapel of Our Lady of Remedies (Portuguese: Capela de Nossa Senhora dos Remédios), is an 18th-century Roman Catholic church located in Feira de Santana, Bahia, Brazil. It was constructed between 1700 and 1705, likely to replace an early church structure. It is the oldest church in Feira de Santana. The church is dedicated to Our Lady of Remedies. It is noted for its wide bell tower, which is topped by a pyramid decorated with fragments of porcelain imported from Macao, a technique found in churches in Cachoeira. The church was listed as a state heritage site by the Institute of Artistic and Cultural Heritage of Bahia in 2006.

== Location ==
The Church of Our Lady of Remedies is located in a dense commercial area of Feira de Santana and faces a small public square of the same name. It was once surrounded by sobrados of the 19th century, but they fell into ruin and were demolished. They were replaced by modern, two-story buildings with shops on the ground floor and residences above. The church is directly adjacent to a six-story modern structure, with more than double the height of the bell tower. This structure, and others, greatly limit views of the church.

== History ==
The Church of Our Lady of Remedies is the oldest religious structure in Feira de Santana. By oral tradition, it replaced a small church dedicated to Our Lady of Remedies built by enslaved people, who worshipped in separate spaces due to strict racial segregation in the Portuguese colonial period. Construction of the chapel dates between 1700 and 1705. While not confirmed, the porcelain tiles of the bell tower were a gift of the industrialist Joaquim Pedreira de Cerqueira (1799-1873). By the 19th century the chapel was used for both religious and secular functions; it hosted meetings of the City Council and the Courts of Juries (Tribunais dos Júris), elections, as well as large-scale liturgical celebrations. Emperor Dom Pedro II visited the church on November 7, 1859, as part of his tour of the Northeast region of Brazil.

The façade of the church was possibly greatly altered in 1917. The portals of the lower level were arched in photos of the late 19th century, but are now square. The church had three later renovations in the 20th century: the first in the early 1930s to chancel and pulpit; the second in 1988 to interior walls and the installation of a new electrical system; and a third in 1997 to the entirety of the church, including its imagery and interior furnishing.

== Structure ==
The Church of Our Lady of Remedies is built on an irregular rectangular plan and has two stories. It covers 625 square metres (6,730 ft^{2}). The church body sits to the left, and a wide, low bell tower and patio sit to the left. The church body and bell towers are in different styles, and may have been built in different periods. The façade of the church is divided into two levels horizontally, with three simple portals at the lower level with three corresponding windows at the choir level. A balustrade runs along the choir level. The façade has a pediment with volutes with an oculus at center. It is surmounted by a small crucifix. The church has a tiled roof, not visible from ground level due to a balustrade that runs at roof level along the length of church.

=== Bell tower ===
The bell tower is "robust and of grand proportion" to the church. It has no portal at the ground level and is divided into a lower and upper level by a small window with a balustrade. The bell tower is topped with an ornate pyramid covered in fragments of porcelain imported from Macao, similar to those found in several churches in Cachoeira. The bells were, by tradition, transferred from the Ilicuritiba Plantation and donated by Felipe Benício Teles Barreto, a plantation owner of Portuguese origin.

=== Interior ===
The church has a single nave and chancel. The nave has plaster walls and tiled flooring installed in the 20th century. The nave has a wide chancel arch with niches on either side in place of side chapels. A lateral corridor behind the bell tower provides access to the sacristy, which occupies the rear of the lower story of the church. A series of grand arcades connect the nave and chancel with the lateral corridor. A nave with arcades of a similar type may be found in the Church of Saint Roch (Igreja de São Roque) in the rural Jaíba district of Feira de Santana; Church of Our Lady of the Remedies Ipuaçu (Igreja de Nossa Senhora dos Remédios) in the rural Ipuaçu district; and the Church of Our Lady of Protection (Igreja de Nossa Senhora do Amparo) in the rural Amparo district of Ipirá.

A pulpit sits at the left of the nave between the arcades, and is accessed via a small circular staircase. The church has noted images of Our Lady of Remedia, Saint Benedict, and Saint Anthony.

The choir is accessed from a stair in the bell tower. The upper story has a large room at the rear of the building corresponding to the sacristy, but is not used. A patio sits at the right side of the bell tower, and has a small portal at street level and is accessed via four portals from the lateral corridor.

== Protected status ==
The Church of Our Lady of Remedies was listed as a state heritage site by the Institute of Artistic and Cultural Heritage of Bahia in 2006.

== Access ==
The church is open to the public and may be visited.
