= Town Hall of São Félix =

- Paço Municipal, formerly the Casa de Câmara e Cadeia
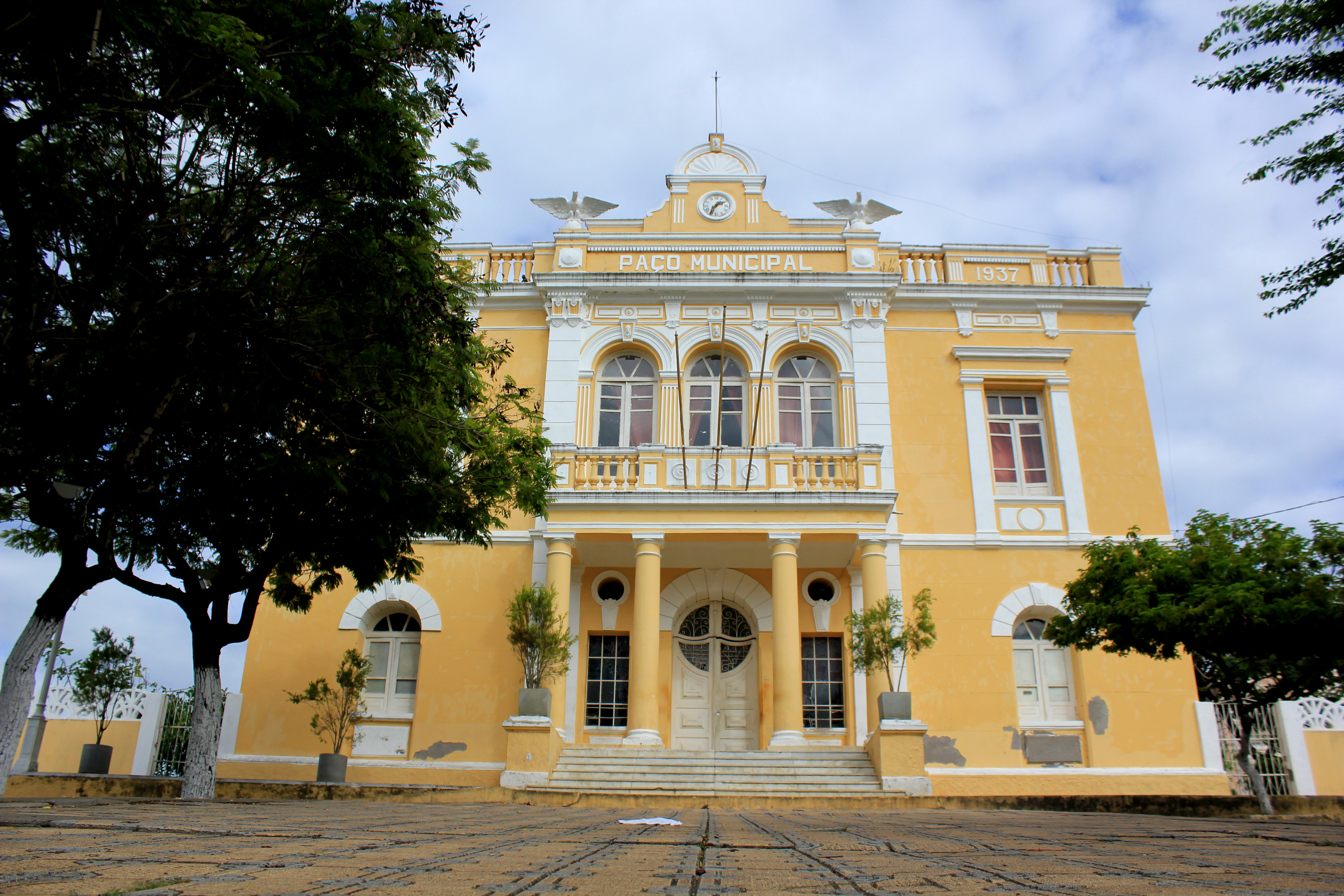
- Town Hall of São Félix, Bahia, Brazil

- Location within Brazil

General information
- Type: Town hall
- Location: São Félix, Bahia, Brazil
- Coordinates: 12.606502°S 38.969577°W
- Completed: 1890

Technical details
- Floor count: 2

The Town Hall of São Félix (Portuguese: Paço Municipal de São Félix) is an 18th-century municipal building in São Félix, Bahia, Brazil. São Félix was a district of Cachoeira, a municipality across the Paraguaçu River, during the Portuguese colonial period of Brazil. It experienced a boom in tobacco production in the late 19th century and became the largest producers of cigars in Brazil. Accordingly, São Félix was separated from Cachoeira and became an independent municipality in 1889. It was elevated to the level of city in 1890 and required a municipal administration building. The structure of the current town hall was the home of Líno Corrector until March 1890. It was purchased by the German-Brazilian cigar factory owner Geraldo Dannemann (born Gerhard Dannemann, 1851-1921) to adapt into a town hall. The building was a replica of a palace in Berlin. The municipal council inaugurated the town hall on December 20, 1890. The building is located in the Historic Center of the city. The structure has two stories; its façade is divided into three parts with a balcony at center and clock above.

== Protected status ==
The Town Hall of São Félix is a protected structure by the Bahian Institute of Artistic Culture and Heritage (Instituto do Patrimônio Artístico e Cultural da Bahia).
