= Rio de Contas =

Municipality of Bahia State, Brazil

Coordinates: 13°34′44″S 41°48′39″W

- Municipality
- Municipality of Rio de Contas
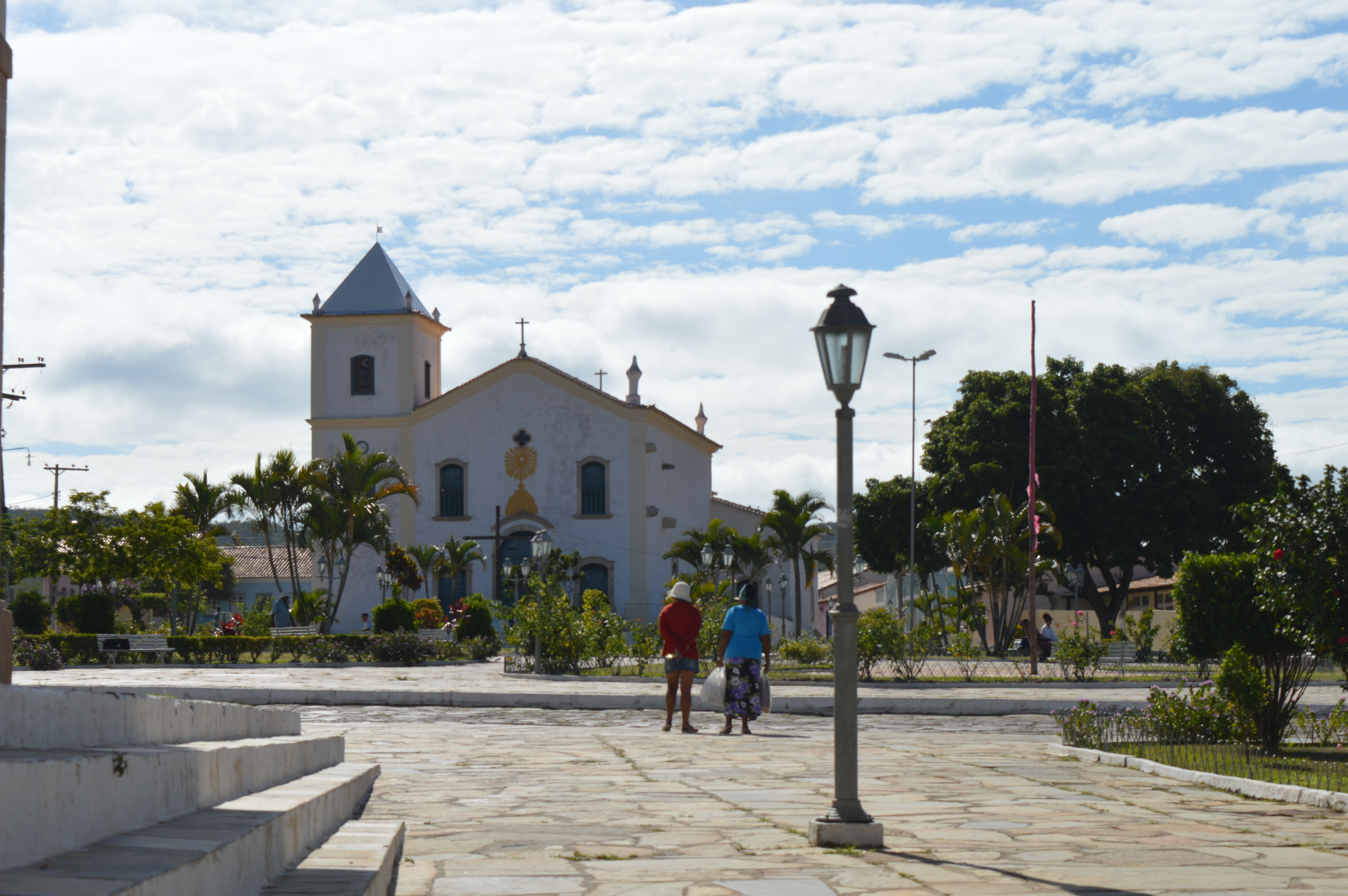
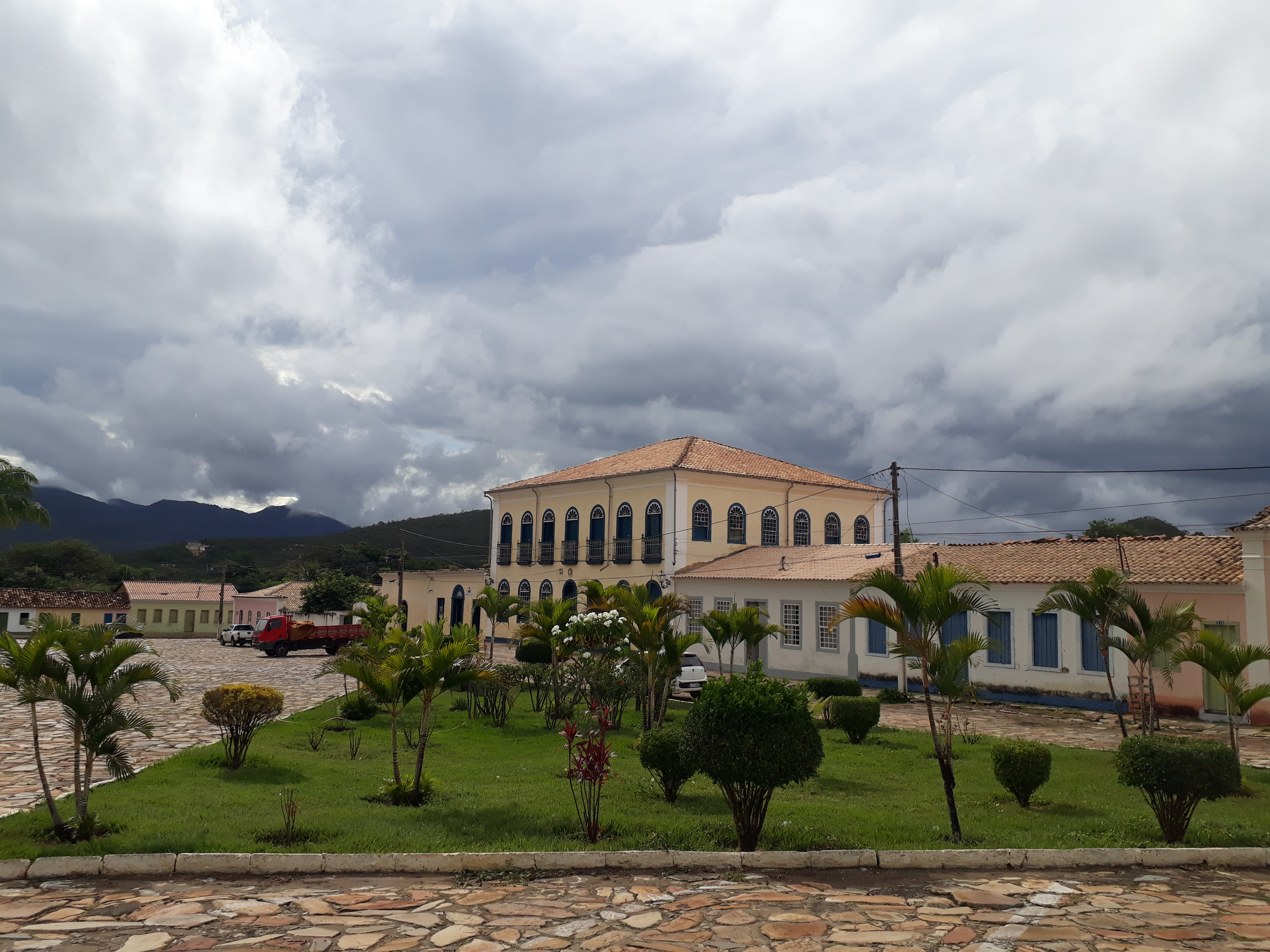
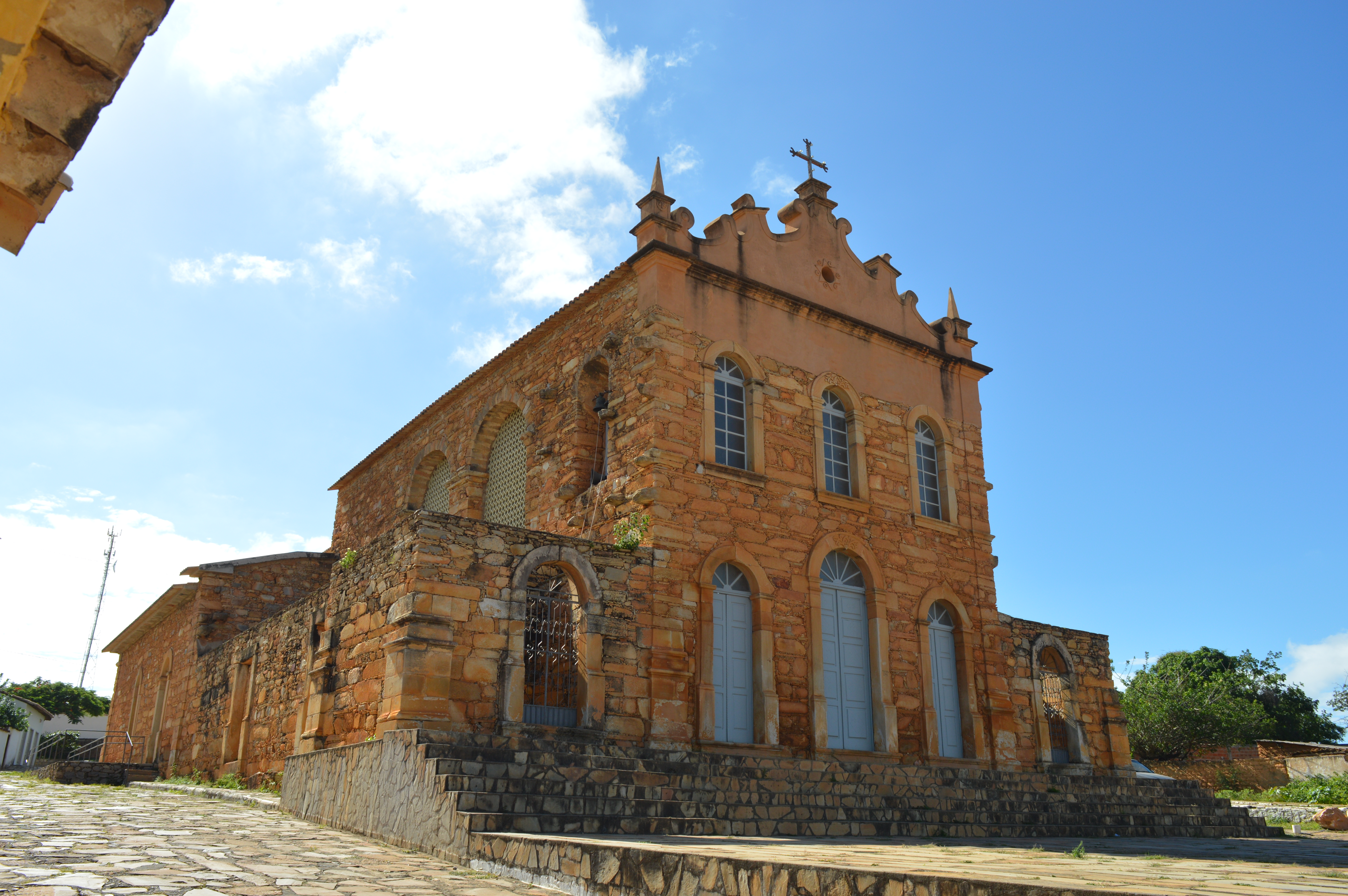
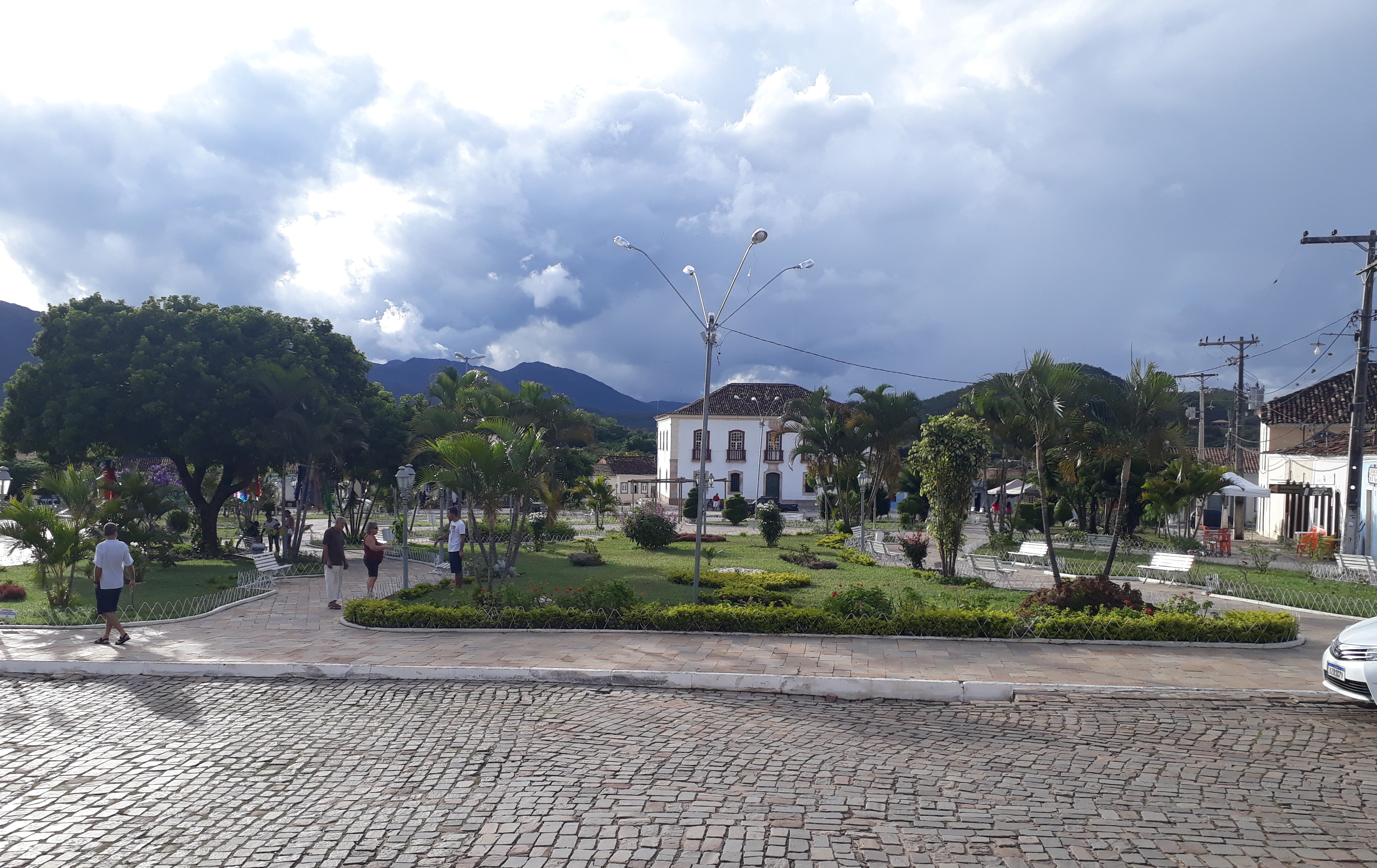
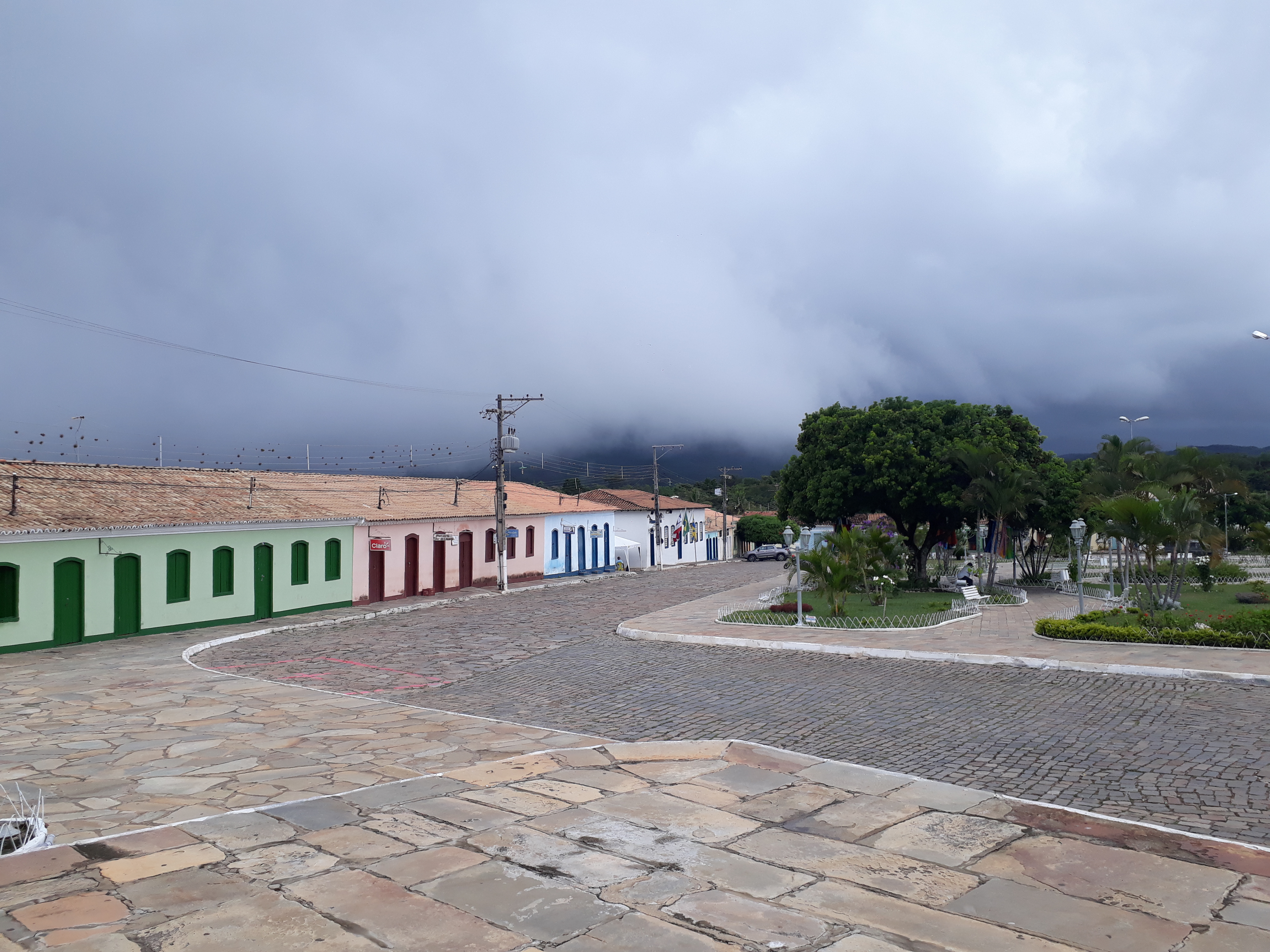
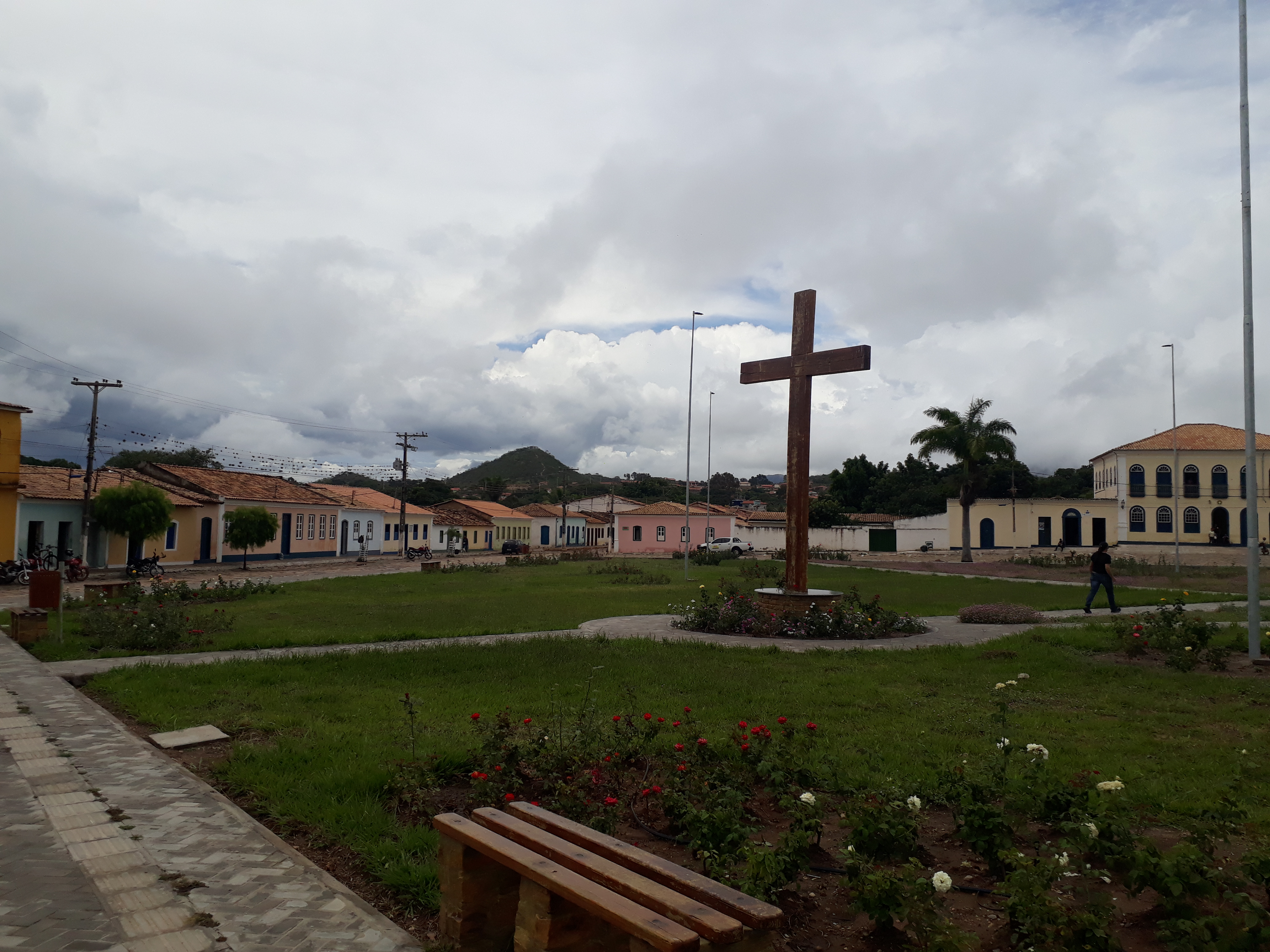
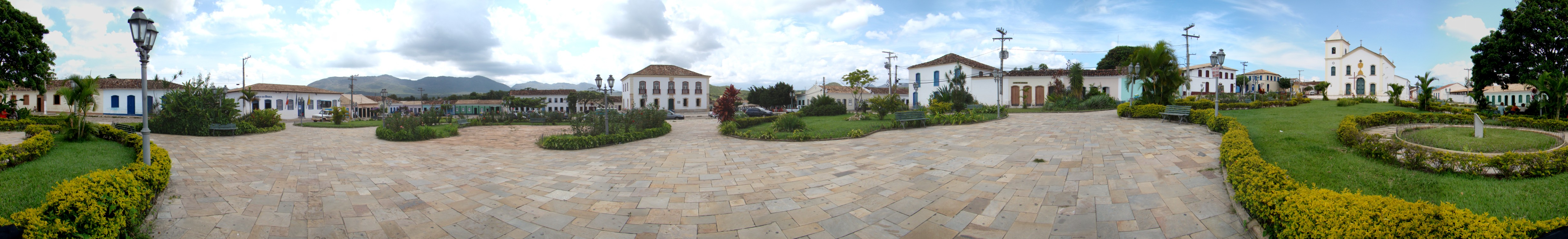

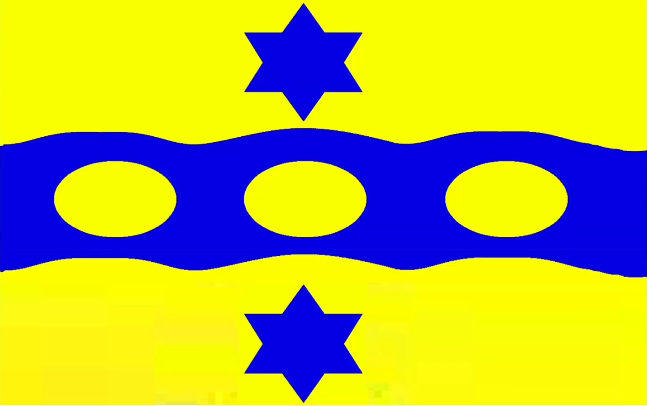
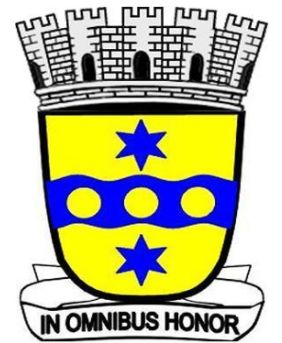
- Flag Coat of arms

- Location in Bahia
- Country: Brazil
- State: Bahia
- Region: Northeast
- Founded: 27 November 1723

Government
  - Mayor: Cristiano Cardoso de Azevedo (PSB)

Area
  - Total: 1,115.252 km^{2} (430.601 sq mi)

Population (2021)
  - Total: 12,878
  - Density: 11.547/km^{2} (29.907/sq mi)
- Demonym: rio-contense
- Time zone: UTC−3 (BRT)
- HDI (2010): 0.605 – medium
- Website: riodecontas.ba.gov.br

Rio de Contas is a municipality in the Bahia state, in the eastern part of Brazil. Its estimated population as of 2020 was 12,932.

Rio de Contas has its origins in the 18th century. In 1718 the town of Santo Antônio de Mato Grosso was founded. It was later elevated to the status of municipality in 1773, with the designation of Vila Nova de Nossa Senhora do Livramento das Minas do Rio de Contas. Its named was shortened in 1840 to Minas do Rio de Contas, and in 1931 to Rio de Contas.

For many arriving from the south, it is the gateway to Chapada Diamantina. It stands at 1,200 metres (3,900 ft) above sea level.

== Historic structures ==
Rio de Contas is home to numerous colonial-period historic structures, many designated as Brazilian national monuments. The historic center of Rio de Contas (Conjunto Arquitetônico da Cidade de Rio de Contas) was designated a national monument by the National Institute of Historic and Artistic Heritage (IPHAN).

- Town Hall and Prison of Rio de Contas (Antiga Casa de Câmara e Cadeia de Rio de Contas)
- House at Rua Barão de Macaúbas, 11 (Casa à Rua Barão de Macaúbas, 11)
- Birthplace of Abílio César Borges at Rua Barão de Macaúbas, 19 (Casa Natal de Abílio César Borges, à rua Barão de Macaúbas, 19)
- Parish Church of the Blessed Sacrament (Igreja Matriz do Santíssimo Sacramento)
- Church of Our Lady of Santana (Ruínas da Igreja de Santana)
