= Feira de Santana =

City in Bahia State, Brazil

Coordinates: 12°15′S 38°57′W

- Municipality
- The Municipality of Feira de Santana
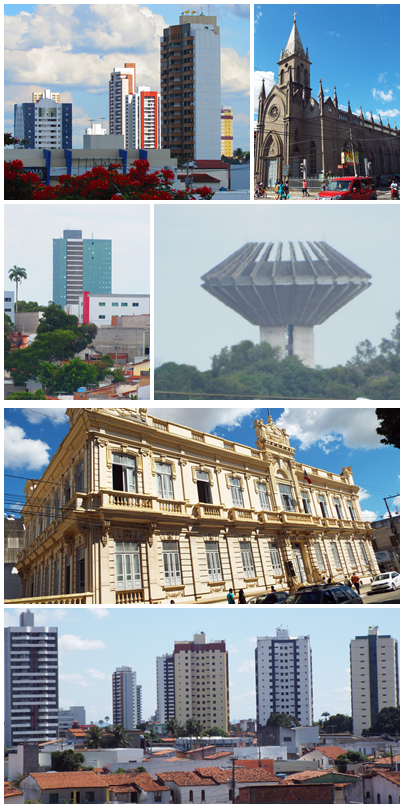
- In clockwise, starting top left: Buildings in the neighborhood Santa Monica, Senhor dos Passos Church, Building Icon Tower, Caixa d'agua Tomba, City Hall and Ponto Central neighborhood.

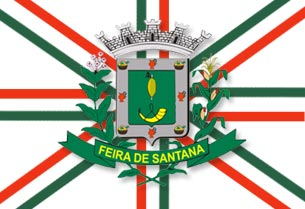
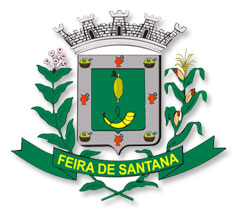
- Flag Coat of arms

- Localization of the city
- Country: Brazil
- Region: Northeast
- State: Bahia

Government
  - Mayor: Colbert Martins da Silva Filho (MDB)

Area
  - Total: 1,362.880 km^{2} (526.211 sq mi)
- Elevation: 286 m (938 ft)

Population (2020)
  - Total: 616,272
  - Density: 452.184/km^{2} (1,171.15/sq mi)
- Time zone: UTC−3 (BRT)
- Postal Code: 44000-000 to 44149-999
- Area code: +55 75
- Website: www.feiradesantana.ba.gov.br

Feira de Santana (Portuguese pronunciation: [ˈfejɾɐ d(ʒi) sɐ̃ˈtɐ̃nɐ]; Portuguese for "Saint Anne's Fair") is a city in Bahia, Brazil. It is the second-largest city in the state, with a population of 616,272 according to IBGE's census in 2022. It is located 100 km northwest of Salvador, Bahia's capital and most populous city. These cities are connected by BR-324, a four-lane divided highway.

== Name ==
Feira de Santana, formerly spelled Feira de Santa Anna, is named in honor of the cattle fairs held at the St-Anne-of-the-Fountains Plantation (Fazenda Sant'Anna dos Olhos D’Água) in the 19th century.

== History ==
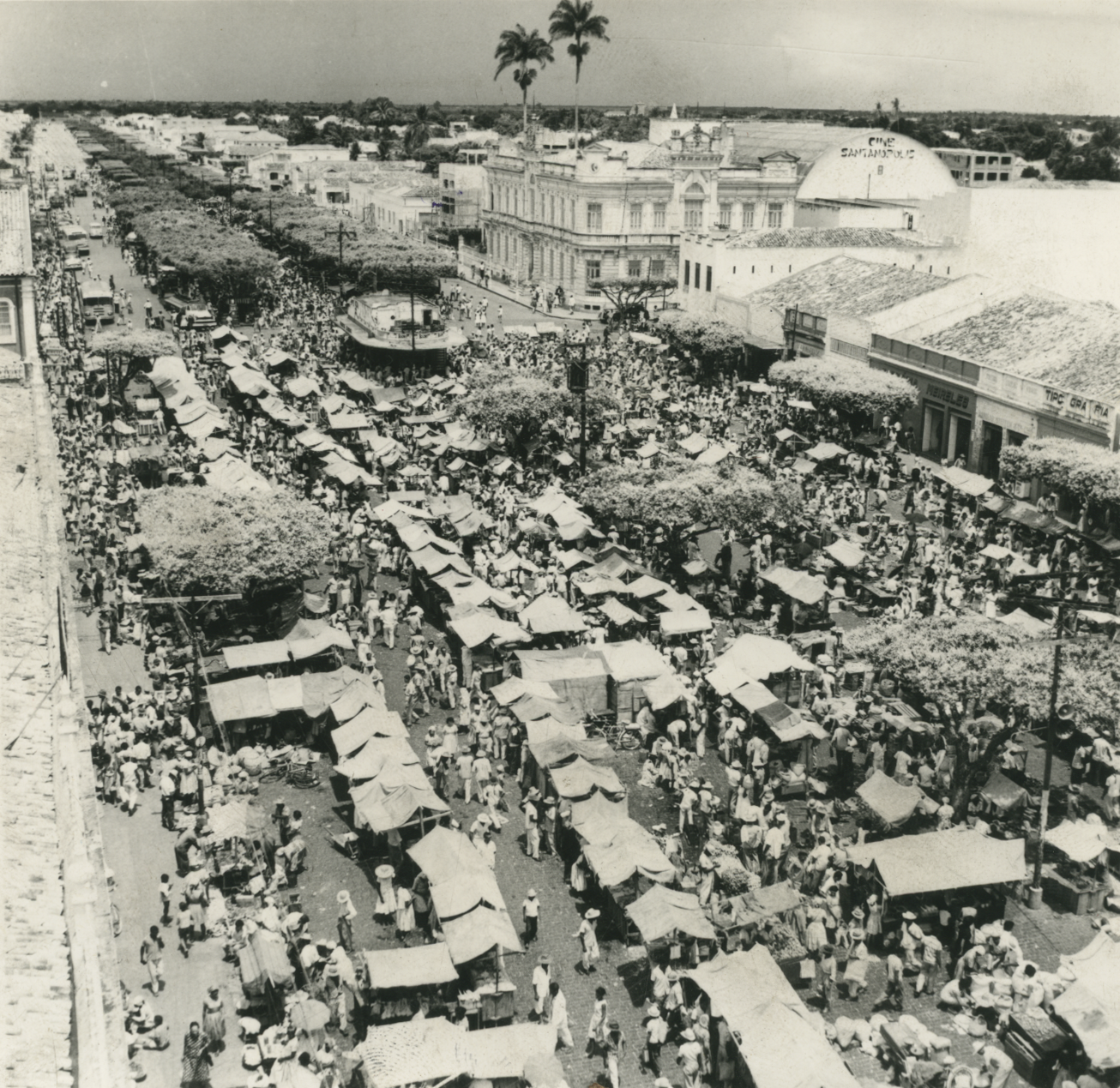
Feira de Santana, 1963.

The St-Anne-of-the-Fountains Plantation was established in the 18th century by Domingos Barbosa de Araujo and his wife Anna Brandoa. Located at the edge of Bahia's "backcountry" (sertão), it became a center for the cowboys on their way from the pastures there to the port of Cachoeira. The cowboys' practice of starting annual fires to clear old brush eventually worsened the area's natural aridity to the point where the cattle industry collapsed, but by then Brazilians and foreigners had begun adopting the area as their home. A city began to develop with wide streets which were bordered by commercial houses serving the area's growing population. It was incorporated as the second city in Bahia after the capital and the 31st in the entirety of colonial Brazil.

Today, Feira de Santana remains the second largest city in Bahia and an important stopping point for travelers.

== Culture ==
Feira de Santana is famous for its parties and festivals, particularly St Anne's Day (Senhora Sant'Ana) in the last week of July, which features activities such as bumba-meu-boi, segura-a-véia, and burrinha. The Micareta carnival party is held 15 days after Passover; the Festival of Violeiros in September; and the donkey race in November. The city boasts of several interesting tourist destinations including a market for local artists, a museum of contemporary art, and the Antares Astronomical Observatory. The city is the seat of the Roman Catholic Archdiocese of Feira de Santana.

== Historic structures ==
Feira de Santana is home to numerous historic structures, many designated as Brazilian federal or Bahian state monuments. The Historic Center as a whole lacks national or state protection.

- Church of Our Lady of Remedies (Igreja de Nossa Senhora dos Remédios)
- St. Ann Cathedral (Catedral de Santana)
- Bandstand at Bernardino Bahia Square (Coreto da Praça Bernardino Bahia)
- Bandstand at Praça da Matriz (Coreto da Praça da Matriz)
- Bandstand at Praça Fróes da Motta (Coreto da Praça Fróes da Motta)
- March 25th Philharmonic Society Building (Filarmônica 25 de Março)
- Church of Our Lord of the Stations (Igreja Senhor dos Passos)
- Chapel of Saint Joseph of Itapororocas (Matriz de São José de Itapororocas)
- Town Hall of Feira de Santana (Paço Municipal, Feira de Santana)
- Panel of the Artist Lênio Braga (Painel do Artista Lênio Braga)
- Maria Quitéria School Building (Prédio da Escola Maria Quitéria)
- Santa Casa de Misericórdia of Feira de Santantana (Prédio da Santa Casa da Misericórdia de Feira de Santana)
- Vila Fróes da Motta Building (Prédio da Vila Froés da Motta)
- Municipal Public Archive of Feira de Santana (Prédio do Arquivo Público Municipal)
- Former Normal School of Feira de Santana (Prédio do Grupo Escolar J.J. Seabra, Antiga Escola Normal Rural)
- Municipal Market of Feira de Santana (Prédio Mercado Municipal, Feira de Santana)

== Economy and transport ==
The city is served by Gov. João Durval Carneiro Airport. With a major junction of Northeastern Brazil's highways nearby, Feira de Santana functions as a crossroads for the traffic coming from the South and West-Central portions of Brazil bound for Salvador and other important cities of the northeast. Feira de Santana, thanks in part to its longstanding importance as a crossroads and its proximity to Salvador, is now an important and diverse commercial and industrial center.

== Education ==
The Universidade Estadual de Feira de Santana is located in the city.

== Sport ==
There is a motorsport rallying club Trail Clube Bahia and have significant input into the Rally Bahia race.

The city's main stadium is the Estádio Alberto Oliveira one of the main stadiums in the state of Bahia. The city's second stadium is Estádio Jodilton Souza.

There are four football clubs: Bahia de Feira, Feirense EC, Fluminense de Feira and Associação Desportiva Comunitária Astro.

== Notable people ==
- Anderson Talisca, footballer
- Carlos Felipe, mixed martial artist
- Divaldo Pereira Franco, spiritist medium
- Fábio Baiano, retired footballer
- Irving São Paulo, actor
- Joedson Santos Almeida, footballer
- Jorge Wagner, retired footballer
- Júnior Baiano, retired footballer
- Maria Quitéria, lieutenant and first woman to serve in a military unit in Brazil

== Climate ==
Climate data for Feira de Santana (1981–2010)
Month	Jan	Feb	Mar	Apr	May	Jun	Jul	Aug	Sep	Oct	Nov	Dec	Year
Mean daily maximum °C (°F)	32.5 (90.5)	32.7 (90.9)	32.5 (90.5)	30.4 (86.7)	28.5 (83.3)	26.7 (80.1)	26.2 (79.2)	26.7 (80.1)	28.5 (83.3)	30.5 (86.9)	31.9 (89.4)	32.6 (90.7)	30.0 (86.0)
Daily mean °C (°F)	26.1 (79.0)	26.3 (79.3)	26.3 (79.3)	25.2 (77.4)	23.8 (74.8)	22.5 (72.5)	21.8 (71.2)	21.7 (71.1)	22.8 (73.0)	24.4 (75.9)	25.5 (77.9)	26.0 (78.8)	24.4 (75.9)
Mean daily minimum °C (°F)	21.3 (70.3)	21.8 (71.2)	21.9 (71.4)	21.5 (70.7)	20.4 (68.7)	19.4 (66.9)	18.4 (65.1)	17.9 (64.2)	18.6 (65.5)	19.8 (67.6)	20.8 (69.4)	21.4 (70.5)	20.3 (68.5)
Average precipitation mm (inches)	68.8 (2.71)	79.1 (3.11)	40.8 (1.61)	66.8 (2.63)	84.7 (3.33)	94.9 (3.74)	72.1 (2.84)	56.5 (2.22)	41.6 (1.64)	31.6 (1.24)	67.4 (2.65)	50.0 (1.97)	754.3 (29.70)
Average precipitation days (≥ 1.0 mm)	10	9	13	11	8	8	11	9	9	9	11	12	120
Average relative humidity (%)	74.6	75.2	76.7	82.2	85.4	88.0	87.0	85.6	81.4	78.1	76.8	74.6	80.5
Source: Instituto Nacional de Meteorologia

== See also ==
- State University of Feira de Santana
- Largest Cities of Northeast Region, Brazil
