= Recôncavo Baiano =

Geographical region in Bahia, Brazil

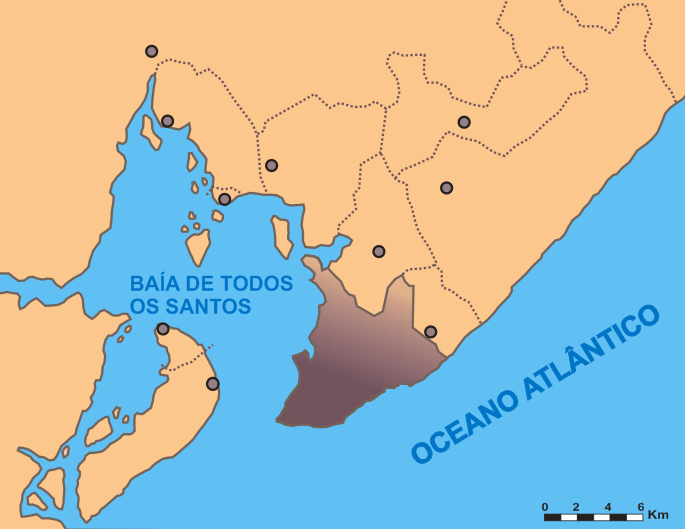
Map of the Bay of All Saints, with the Metropolitan Region of Salvador highlighted.

The Recôncavo Baiano is a geographical region located in the Brazilian state of Bahia that covers the inland area surrounding the Bay of All Saints and the Metropolitan Region of Salvador. However, the expression is not constantly used to refer to Salvador.

The region is very rich in oil. In agriculture, sugar cane, manioc, tobacco and some tropical fruit crops are suitable for planting. Since the beginning of Brazil's colonization, the word "recôncavo", originally used to describe lands around a bay, has been associated with the area near the Bay of All Saints.

== History ==
In the 16th century, the Recôncavo Baiano was notable for the presence of brazilwood. The local climate contributed to the cultivation of sugar cane crops, which became the strongest economic activity in the area and resulted in the construction of more than 400 sugar mills. The massive presence of Africans enslaved on Brazilian plantations influenced different cultural elements, such as music, food and religion.

A genetic study conducted in municipalities in the Recôncavo Baiano confirmed the high degree of African ancestry in the region. People from the urban areas of Cachoeira and Maragojipe were analyzed, as well as quilombolas from the rural area of Cachoeira. The result indicated that African ancestry was 80.4%, European ancestry 10.8% and indigenous ancestry 8.8%. In Salvador, the genetic analysis carried out on the population confirmed that the city's largest genetic contribution is African (49.2%), followed by European (36.3%) and indigenous (14.5%). It also concluded that individuals who have a surname with a religious connotation are more likely to have African ancestry (54.9%) and to belong to less privileged social classes.

== Geography ==
Map of the Recôncavo Baiano, 1899. National Archives.

The Recôncavo Baiano covers 20 cities: Aratuípe, Cabaceiras do Paraguaçu, Cachoeira, Castro Alves, Conceição do Almeida, Cruz das Almas, Dom Macedo Costa, Governador Mangabeira, Itatim, Jaguaripe, Maragogipe, Muniz Ferreira, Muritiba, Nazaré, Salinas da Margarida, Santa Terezinha, Santo Amaro, Santo Antônio de Jesus, São Felipe, São Felix, São Miguel das Matas, São Gonçalo dos Campos, Sapeaçu, Saubara and Varzedo.

The region features stretches of Atlantic Forest with typical specimens of caatinga and cerrado. The soils in the valleys and at the mouths of the Paraguaçu, Jaguaripe and Subaé rivers are shallow, well-drained and have medium to high natural fertility. It also presents the highly fertile massapê soil, which originates from the pedogenetic processes of igneous and meta-igneous rocks such as basalt, gabbro, green schist and chlorite schist.

== Education ==
Besides the Federal University of Bahia (UFBA) and the Federal Institute of Bahia (IFBA), both based in Salvador, the Recôncavo Baiano also features two other public institutions: the Federal University of Recôncavo da Bahia (UFRB), with campuses in the cities of Cruz das Almas, Santo Antônio de Jesus, Amargosa, Santo Amaro and Cachoeira, and the University for International Integration of the Afro-Brazilian Lusophony (UNILAB), based in São Francisco do Conde. Santo Antônio de Jesus has a campus of the State University of Bahia (UNEB) and of the Adventist College of Bahia (FADBA), which was the first private higher education institution in the region.

== Culture ==
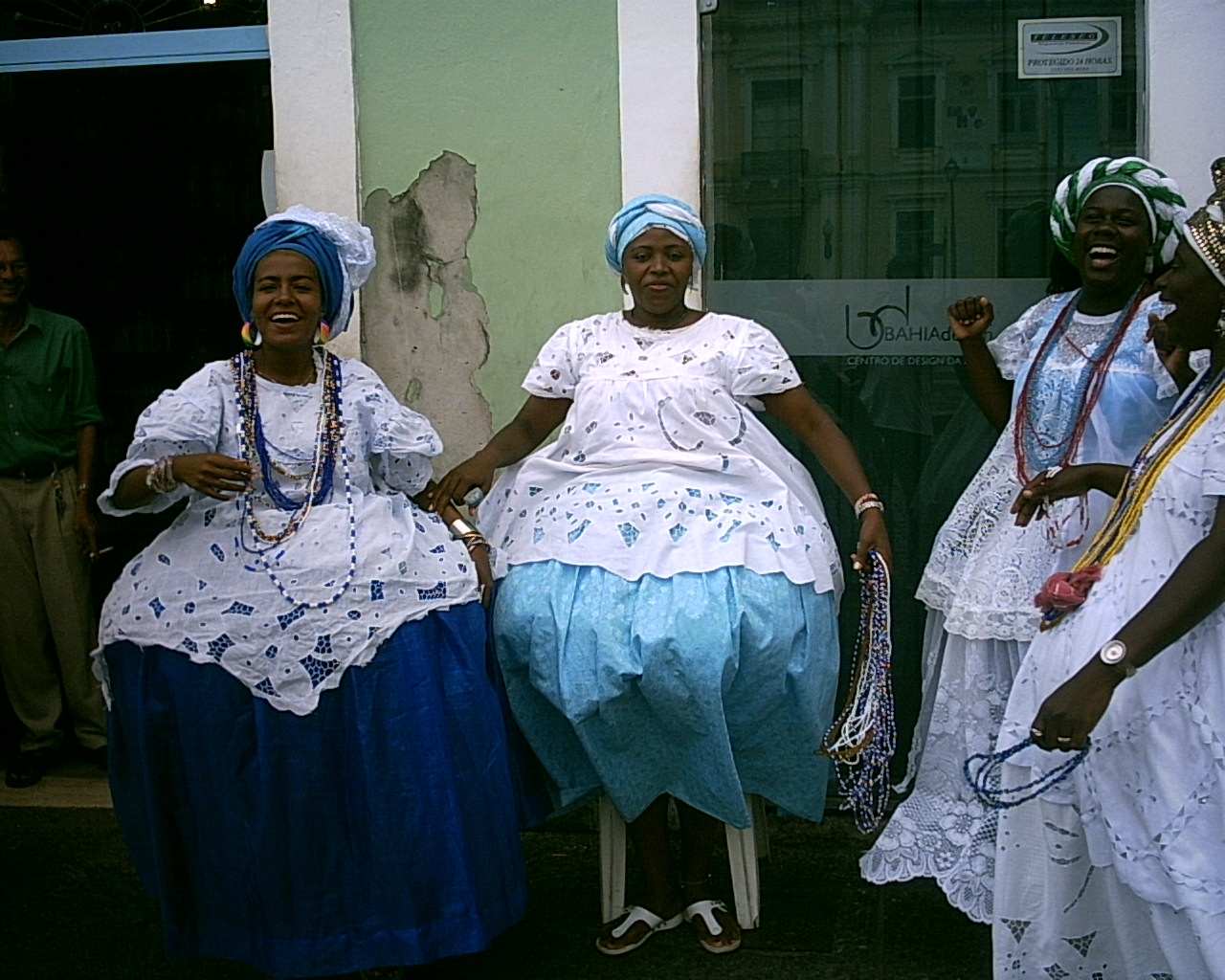
Salvador is the city with the highest number of Afro-descendants in Brazil.

Around 1860, the first manifestations of samba de roda, proclaimed a Masterpiece of the Oral and Intangible Heritage of Humanity by UNESCO, appeared in the Recôncavo Baiano. The region is notable for the Velloso family (originally with two "l"s), originally from Santo Amaro da Purificação, which includes singers Caetano Veloso and Maria Bethânia, who began their careers in the 1960s.

Several cities in the region host festivals that unite Catholic and Afro-Brazilian religions. In Cachoeira, the Confraternity of Our Lady of Good Death is responsible for organizing the annual Festa da Boa Morte on August 13, which includes mass, samba and food. In Salvador, the Lavagem do Bonfim is held every January and includes the washing of the steps and atrium of the Church of Our Lord of Bonfim.

== See also ==
- Chapada Diamantina
- Colonial architecture of Brazil
- List of municipalities in Bahia
