= Jaguaripe =

Municipality of Bahia, Brazil

Coordinates: 13°06′46″S 38°53′45″W

- Municipality
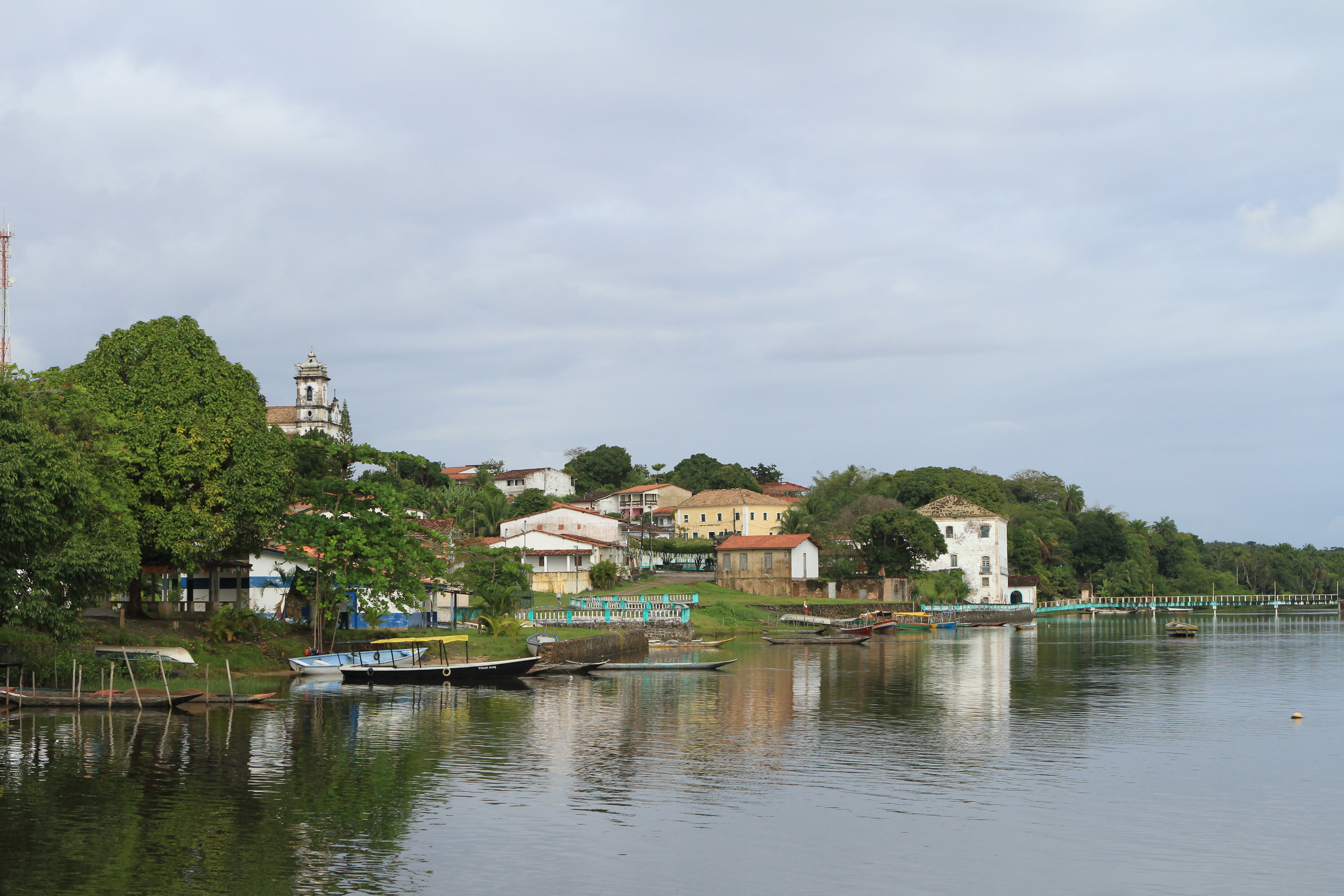
- View of Jaguaripe from the Jaguaripe River

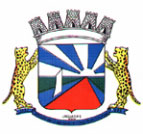
- Flag Coat of arms
- Interactive map of Jaguaripe
- Country: Brazil
- Region: Nordeste
- State: Bahia
- Established: 1693

Government
  - mayor: Heráclito Rocha Arandas

Population (2020)
  - Total: 18,981
- Time zone: UTC−3 (BRT)

Jaguaripe is a municipality in the state of Bahia in the North-East region of Brazil. It covers 863.424 km^{2} (333.370 mi^{2}), and has a population of 18,981 with a population density of 18.32 inhabitants per square kilometer. Jaguaripe is located 130 km (81 mi) from the state capital of Bahia, Salvador. Jaguaripe shares a border with the municipalities of Aratuípe, Nazaré, Maragogipe, Laje, São Miguel das Matas, and Santo Antônio de Jesus. It was the first municipality created outside of Salvador, dating to 1693.

== Etymology ==
"Jaguaripe" comes from the Tupi language term îagûarype, meaning "in the river of jaguars" (îagûara, jaguar + 'y, river + pe, em).

== Location ==
The municipal center of Jaguaripe sits on a narrow strip of land between the Jaguaripe River and a smaller tributary, the Dona River. The location is a few kilometers from the Bay of All Saints. The municipality additionally encompasses a large rural area in the Bahian Recôncavo. Jaguripe, like São Francisco do Conde, has the seat of religious power of the municipality at its highest point, and the center of government at its lowest point near a river.

== History ==
Jaguaripe was home to speakers of Macro-Jê languages, ancient inhabitants of the Recôncavo Baiano region. The Tupi people emerged from the Amazon and expelled the Macro-Jês peoples. The Portuguese arrived in the region in 16th century, and encountered Tupinambá settlements. European colonization of Jaguaripe dates to the beginning of the 17th century under Mem de Sá (ca. 1500-1572), the 3rd General Government of Brazil. Mem de Sá, on the advice of Father Manuel da Nóbrega, directed the Jesuits to establish small Christian settlements (aldeias) to baptize and education indigenous people.

A Jesuit mission, the Aldeia de Santa Cruz, was created on the Island of Itaparica in 1560 by Father Pedro Lírio da Gra. A large smallpox epidemic broke out between 1560 and 1568 that decimated much of the aldeia. The Jesuits decided to transfer the remnants of the Aldeia de Santa Cruz to the present-day city of Jaguaripe until the end of the plague. The aldeia subsequently became a settlement on a strip of land between the Jaguaripe River and the smaller Dona River. The Jaguaripe River extends from Nazare and Maragogipinho to the northeast, and opens into the Bay of All Saints at Itaparica Island to the east.

The Portuguese established sugarcane plantations in the area by the late 16th century. The first land grant in Jaguaripe was given by governor Mem de Sa to Ana Álvares, eldest daughter of Caramuru. The settlement was called the Arraial de Nossa Senhora da Ajuda by the early 17th century; it was elevated to the level of freguesia, or civil parish, by Bishop Dom Constantino Barrada (1550-1618), in 1613. The Jaguaripe region was home to a messianic movement called the Santidade de Jaguaripe. It developed in the 1580s among indigenous peoples due to enslavement and forced settlement. Enslaved Africans joined the movement, which spread across Bahia and Pernambuco. The Santidade de Jaguaripe was violently suppressed in the early 17th century.

It was raised to village level in December 1697 under Dom João de Lencastro (1646-1707), a Portuguese colonial administrator. Jaguaripe, once a center of sugarcane production and timber extraction, diminished in importance as other cities in the Recôncavo increased. It was elevated to municipal level in 1899.

== Historic structures ==
Jaguaripe is home to numerous colonial-period historic structures, some designated Brazilian national state monuments by the National Institute of Historic and Artistic Heritage (IPHAN).

- Parish Church of Our Lady of Help (Igreja Matriz de Nossa Senhora da Ajuda)
- Church of Our Lady the Mother of God (Igreja de Nossa Senhora da Madre de Deus)
- Church of Our Lady of the Rosary (Igreja de Nossa Senhora do Rosário)
- Town Hall and Prison of Jaguaripe (Casa da Câmara e Cadeia)
- Magistrate's House (Casa do Ouvidor)

== See also ==
- List of municipalities in Bahia
