= Cristóvão Jacques =

Portuguese noble

Cristóvão Jaques (Christopher Jaques), also known as Cristóvão Valjaques (c. 1480 in Algarve, Kingdom of Portugal – after 1530), was a Portuguese noble of Aragonese descent.

He was the illegitimate son of Pero Jaques, and was legitimized by D. João II (1481–1495) and was later made a nobleman by the Royal House of D. Manuel I (1495–1521).

He married a daughter of Francisco Portocarreiro, with whom he had three children.

In 1503 he first came to the coast of Brazil in the fleet commanded by Gonçalo Coelho.

In 1516, in command of two caravels, he was in charge of patrolling the coast of Brazil in order to discourage incursions by French pirates. In November of that year he landed in a large bay, which he named Baía de Todos os Santos (Bay of all Saints). In Río de la Plata he fought and imprisoned many French. He traveled up and down the coast until 1519.

On 21 July 1521 he sailed from the mouth of Rio Tejo (Tagus) to Brazil, founded an outpost in Itamaracá, Pernambuco, one of the most popular anchorages on the Brazilian coast, where there was plenty of Brazil wood (Caesalpinia echinata) and had frequent contacts between Natives and Europeans, before going south to Río de la Plata and entering the Parana River for about 23 leagues (around 140 km) to near the present city of Rosario for the first time.

Finally, in 1526, he was appointed, by King João III, as Governor of all Parts of Brazil, replacing Pero Capico in Pernambuco, and returned again in command of a ship and five caravels, having countless battles with French pirates. In 1527 he imprisoned three French galleons in Recôncavo, Bahia. But having acted with barbarity towards the prisoners, this gesture eventually caused him major problems with D. João III (1521–1557).

Upon returning to Portugal, he made an offer to the King, in which Jacques would take one thousand colonists, at his own expense, to begin the permanent occupation of the new lands in Brazil, but nothing came of the proposal.

Records show that, only four years after the Portuguese arrived in Brazil, the French traveled the shores of Rio Paraguaçu, dealing with the natives. The official discovery of the river is, however, attributed to Cristóvão Jacques, commander of the expedition bodyguards in 1526. Three rivers flow into the Bahia de Todos os Santos - the Jaguaripe, the Subaé and Paraguaçu. The Paraguaçu is the longest, with 600 km long, which made it be called "big river" in Indian language. Subaé River, which borders Santo Amaro, Bahia would be the river of sugar mills, the Jaguaripe River that is present in the city of Nazaré, Bahia, the river of flour, and Paraguaçu, with its length, the river of penetration into the captaincy.

In a letter from Frei Vicente do Salvador, it is recorded that Christóvão Jacques found an island (already controlled by the French), on the lower river course of the Paraguaçu two ships that traded with the Indians, and were properly sunk. At the site there would be a town later named village of Nossa Senhora do Rosário da Cachoeira, in the early 17th century allotment of Gaspar Dias Adorno, ideal for penetration of the captaincy.
