= Town Hall and Prison of Jaguaripe =

Building in Bahia, Brazil, 18th century

- Paço Municipal de Jaguaripe
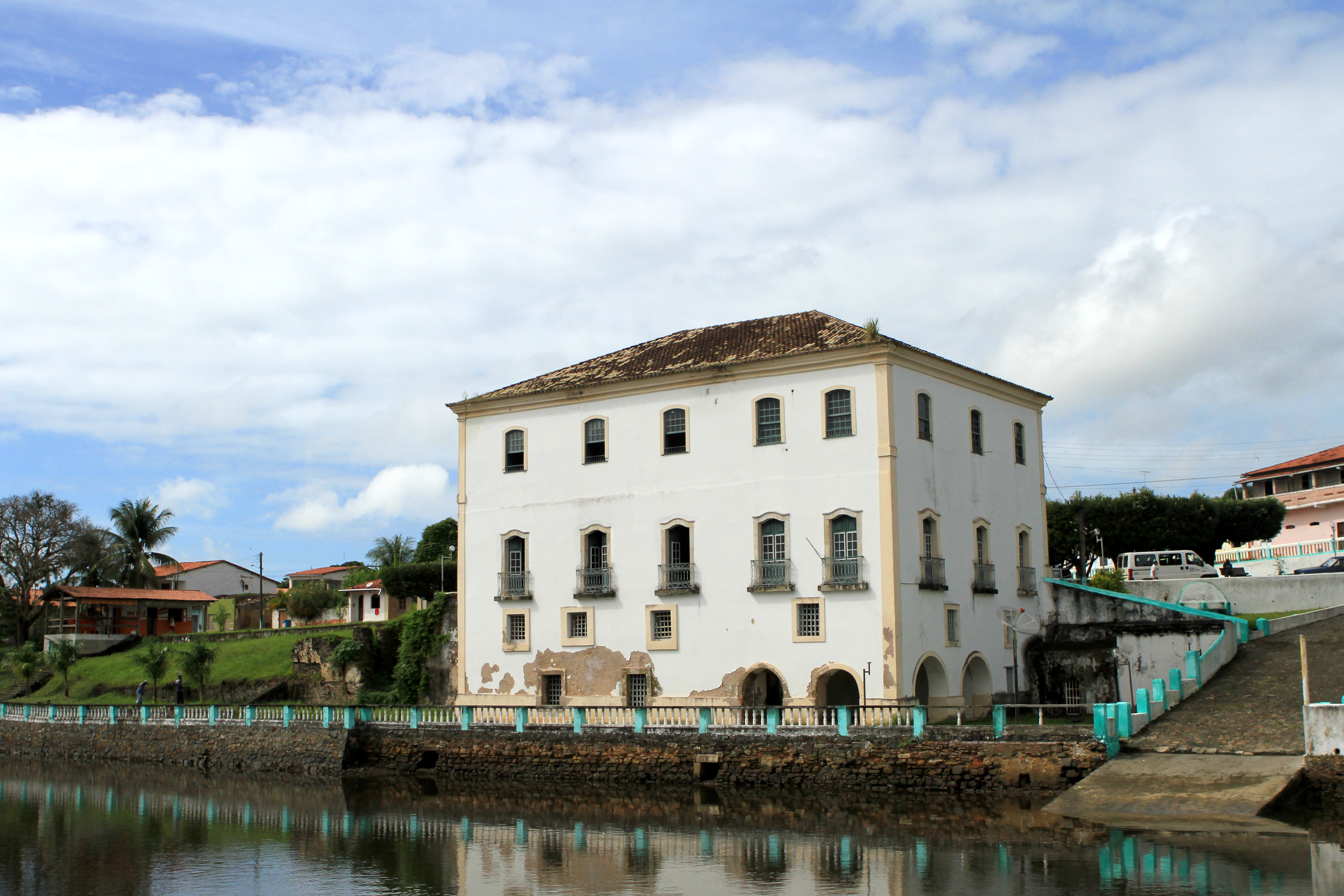
- Town Hall and Prison of Jaguaripe, Jaguaripe, Bahia, Brazil

- Location within Brazil

General information
- Type: town hall
- Location: Praça da Bandeira, 1, Centro, Jaguaripe, Bahia, 44480-000
- Coordinates: 13.112544°S 38.895028°W
- Groundbreaking: 1693
- Inaugurated: 1697

Technical details
- Floor count: 4
- Floor area: 830 square metres (8,900 ft^{2})

National Historic Heritage of Brazil
- Designated: 1941
- Reference no.: 265

The Town Hall and Prison of Jaguaripe (Portuguese: Paço Municipal de Jaguaripe) is an 18th-century municipal building in Jaguaripe, Bahia, Brazil. It was inaugurated in 1697 and served as a town hall, prison, and occasional housing for military troops. The structure is visible from much of the surrounding region, and served as a model for town halls built both in the Recôncavo and sertão regions of Bahia in the 17th and 18th centuries. It was listed as a historic structure by the National Institute of Historic and Artistic Heritage in 1941 and remains a municipal building of Jaguaripe. By tradition the prison had a cellar, the "Prison of Salt" (Prisão do Sal), a dungeon that flooded according to the tides of the river.

== Location ==
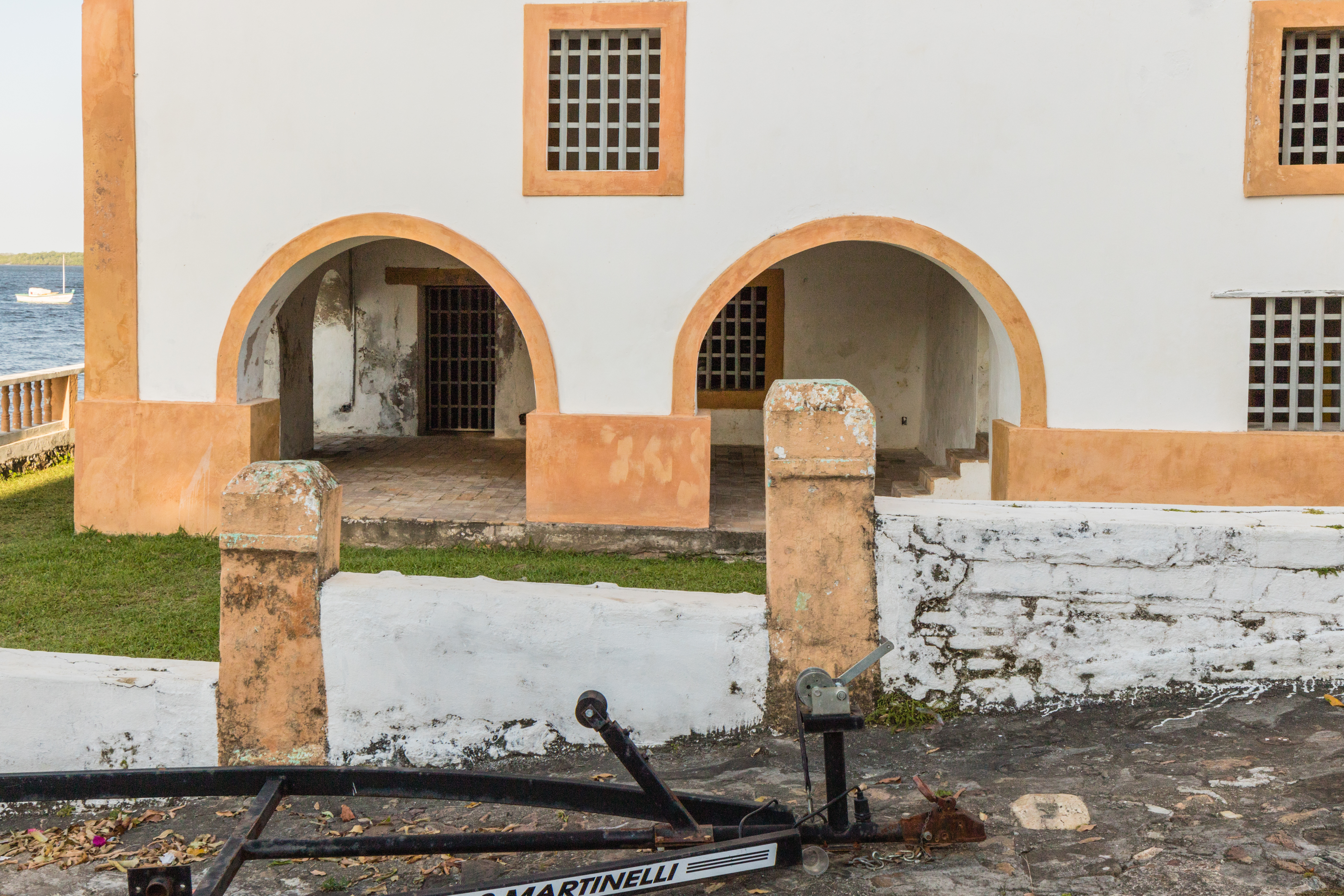
View of external arches and barred windows of prison

The town hall, due to its volume and location on the Jaguaripe River, is visible from great distance by water and land. The Ladeira da Ajuda, a stone paved street, extends from the Parish Church of Our Lady of Help (Igreja Matriz de Nossa Senhora da Ajuda) at the highest point in the city down to the town hall, and forms the central axis of the city. The upper floor of the town hall has views of both the town of Jaguaripe towards the Church of Ajuda and the region surrounding the Jaguaripe River. It opens to the Praça da Bandeira, a broad public square.

== History ==
The Town Hall and Prison of Jaguaripe is one of the oldest in Bahia. Jaguaripe was established as a freguesia in 1613 under the name Nossa Senhora da Ajuda, and elevated to city level in 1697. The town hall was correspondingly built beginning in 1693 and inaugurated in 1697. The high construction costs of the town hall led to an inquiry by the Portuguese Crown to investigate the possible misuse of funds. The town hall likely served as a model for those built in Bahia in the 17th and 18th century in both the Recôncavo and Bahian sertão, notably those of São Francisco do Conde, Porto Seguro, Caetité, Condeuba, Rio de Contas. Dom Pedro II, Emperor of Brazil, visited the town hall in 1859. He recorded fine furniture and oil paintings of the Portuguese royal family in his diary, but they no longer remain. Francisco Vicente Vianna described it in 1893 as a "a large and solid construction from the first years of the 18th century", still in use with "vast amenities" for the town council, and offices for current and retired judges. The proclamation of the First Brazilian Republic was made from the town hall to a large gathering in the plaza on November 19, 1889.

== Structure ==
The Town Hall and Prison of Jaguaripe resembles Portuguese colonial residential architecture of the 17th century. It is built on a rectangular floor plan and covers 830 square metres (8,900 ft^{2}). The structure is built on a slope, with two floors on the plaza side and four on the river-facing side. The lowest floors, which functioned as a prison, have only three interconnected rooms due to the slope of the land towards the river. The year of its construction, 1697, is found above the entrance. The doors and windows are simple, with those in the lower floor framed in stone. The lower windows and doors have straight lintels, while the upper windows are gently arched. The upper floor has five windows on the plaza- and river-facing facades. Those on the plaza-facing facade have iron balconets. The windows of the lower floors have iron bars, reflecting their function as a prison. The floors are connected by a staircase at center. The building has a simple hipped roof with glazed clay barrel tiles.

== Protected status ==
The Town Hall and Prison of Jaguaripe was listed as a historic structure by the National Institute of Historic and Artistic Heritage in 1941 under inscription number 265.
