= Chapel of Loreto =

17th-century church in Brazil

- Capela do Loreto
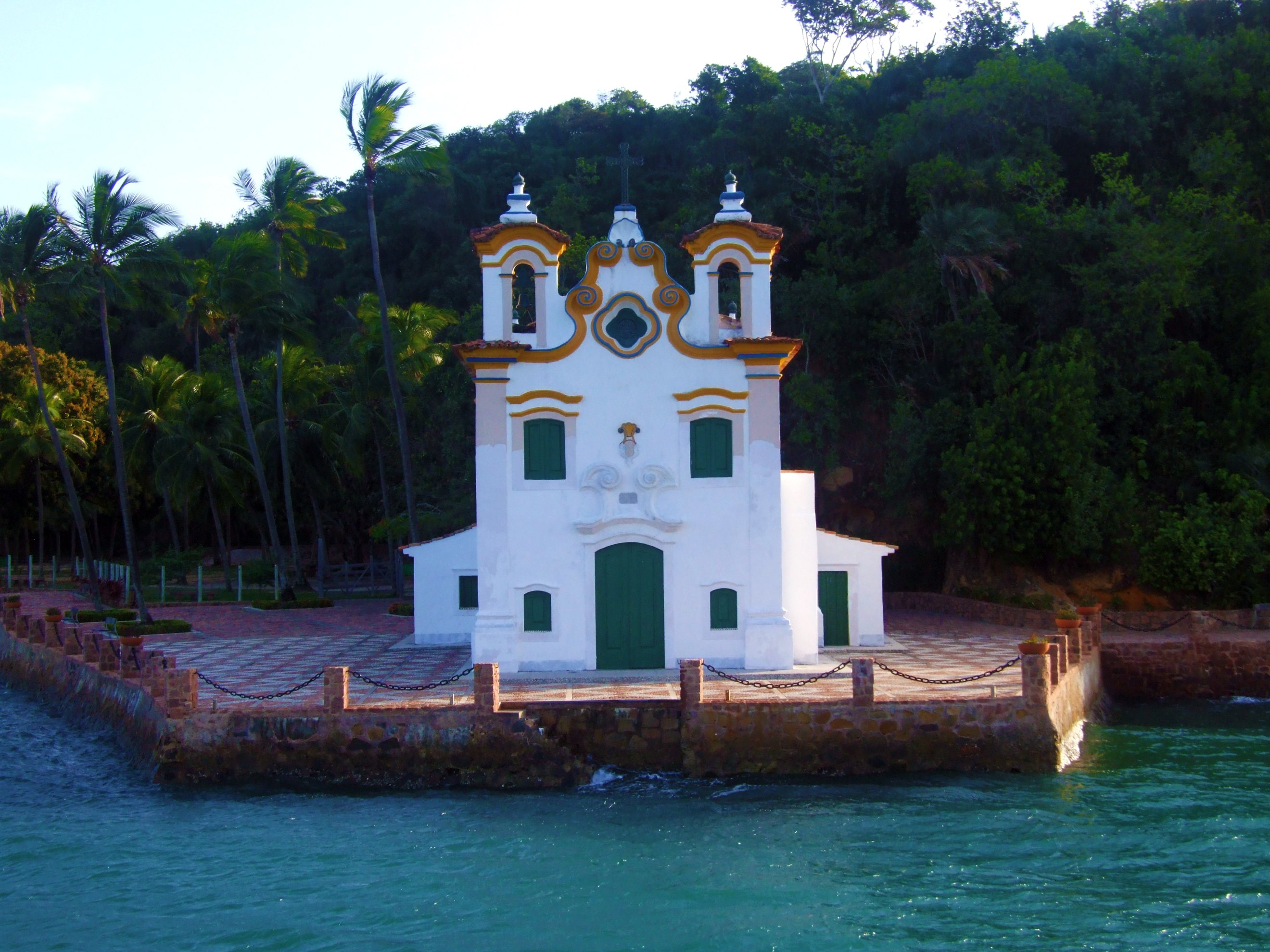
- Chapel of Loreto, Ilha dos Frades, Salvador, Brazil

- Location of the Chapel of Loreto in Brazil

Religion
- Affiliation: Catholic
- Rite: Roman
- Patron: Our Lady of Loreto

Location
- Municipality: Salvador
- State: Bahia
- Country: Brazil
- Interactive map of Chapel of Loreto
- Coordinates: 12.757569°S 38.623941°W

Architecture
- Style: Baroque
- Established: 1645
- Direction of façade: North

The Chapel of Loreto (Portuguese: Capela do Loreto, also Chapel of Our Lady of Loreto (Capela de Nossa Senhora do Loreto)) is a 17th-century Roman Catholic church located on the Ilha dos Frades, in the Bay of All Saints, Brazil. The island is within the limits of the municipality of Salvador. It is dedicated to Our Lady of Loreto. The architect Mário Mendonça de Oliveira describes it as "a highly elegant building, with a sophisticated design and an attractive coastal setting on the Island of Frades." The building is protected as a historic structure by the state of Bahia.

== History ==
The Chapel of Loreto is one of many sugarcane plantation chapels of the Recôncavo region. It was founded in 1645, as recorded by Friar Agostinho de Santa Maria. He attributes the construction to Francisco da Costa, an early landowner on the island. The chapel may date to the 18th century, given its numerous architectural details common to the period. The chapel was modified in 1756, as memorialized by a plaque above the portal: The Chapel of Our Lady of Loreto was renewed by the Brotherhood of ... of the city of Bahia. It was in 1756." Further modifications were made in 1876 by T. Cel. Fortunato Jr. da Cunha, according to another plaque on the building.

== Location ==
The Chapel of Loreto sits at the north end of the Ilha dos Frades facing the municipality of Madre de Deus. Due to its location directly on the waterfront, it is at continual risk of flooding. The church yard also functions as a small pier. The chapel, unusually, has no other structures in its proximity.

== Structure ==
The Chapel of Loreto is a simple two-storey structure of brick and lime. The exterior has a portal and two small windows at the first storey; two windows at the choir level; a baroque-style pediment above the choir level, which sits between two belfries. The belfries are surmounted by small bulbs and flaming urns. The pediment, while simpler than those found in churches in the city of Salvador, has a quatrefoil oculus at center with volutes to the left and right. The portal, while lacking a complex pediment, has fine tracings and volutes with a plaque at center. A coat of arms was originally located above the portal at the choir level. The structure appears to have bell towers to the left and right. They are actually angled walls at the facade and side walls, with simple belfries above.

The interior has a single nave, accessed from a single portal; a chancel and high altar; a sacristy to the left of the structure; a consistory to the right; and a small choir above the entrance. The sacristy and consistory are accessed via portals in the chancel. The high altar is in the Neoclassical style, and is probably composed of elements brought from other churches in Salvador.

Records indicate that the founder of the chapel may be interred within the structure.

== Protected status ==
The Chapel of Loreto is designated a protected structure by the Bahian Institute of Artistic Culture and Heritage (Instituto do Patrimônio Artístico e Cultural da Bahia).

== Access ==
The Chapel of Loreto is opened infrequently and may be visited with permission.

== Footnote ==
In Portuguese: Capela Nossa Senhora do Loreto feita de novo pelos IRM. de... da cidade da Bahia. Era de 1756 anos.
