= Domingos (footballer, born 1985) =

Brazilian footballer

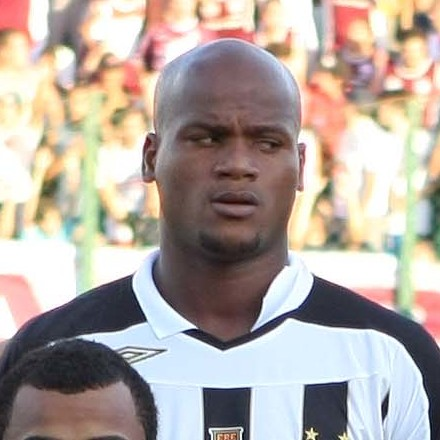
- Domingos with Santos in 2008

Personal information
- Full name: Domingos Nascimento dos Santos Filho
- Date of birth: 12 December 1985 (age 40)
- Place of birth: Muniz Ferreira, Brazil
- Height: 1.85 m (6 ft 1 in)
- Position: Centre back

Youth career
- 2000–2003: Santos

Senior career*
| Years | Team | Apps | (Gls) |
| 2004–2011 | Santos | 155 | (3) |
| 2005 | → Grêmio (loan) | 24 | (2) |
| 2009–2011 | → Portuguesa (loan) | 60 | (4) |
| 2011 | → São Caetano (loan) | 12 | (0) |
| 2012 | Guarani | 20 | (2) |
| 2012–2017 | Al-Kharitiyath | 103 | (10) |
| 2018 | Santo André | 10 | (0) |
| 2019 | Aparecidense | 2 | (0) |
| 2019 | Portuguesa | 0 | (0) |
| 2020 | São Caetano | 10 | (1) |
- * Club domestic league appearances and goals as of 15:39, 3 March 2021 (UTC)

Domingos Nascimento dos Santos Filho (born 12 December 1985), simply known as Domingos, is a Brazilian footballer who plays as a central defender.

== Career ==
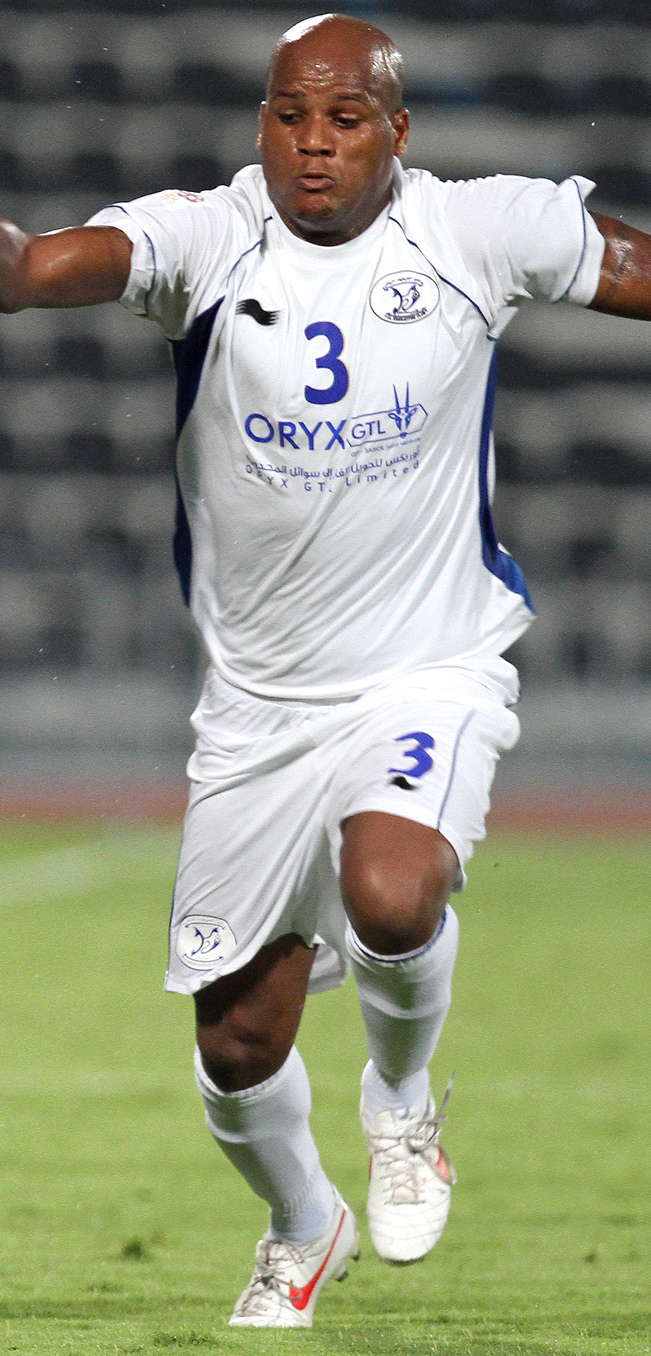
Domingos with Al-Kharitiyath in 2012

Born in Muniz Ferreira, Bahia, he began his career in the youth side with Santos who was 2004 promoted to the Campeonato Brasileiro Série A team after 32 games and one game in his first season joined in winter 2005 to rival Grêmio on loan. On 15 September 2009 Santos Futebol Clube have loaned their central defender to second division club Portuguesa.

== Honours ==
Santos

- Brazilian League: 2004
- São Paulo State League: 2006, 2007

Grêmio

- Brazilian League (2nd division): 2005
