= Saney Sampaio =

Brazilian politician

President of Socialist Youth of the PDT in Maranhão
- In office December 11, 2001 – March 30, 2011
- Preceded by: Luciano Leitoa
- Succeeded by: Raimundo Penha

General Secretary of the National Union of Students
- In office October 2003 – October 2005

Personal details
- Born: Saney Santos Sampaio; January 24, 1976 (age 50) Cruz das Almas, BA
- Party: PCdoB
- Profession: Politician

Saney Santos Sampaio, better known as Saney Sampaio (born January 24, 1976, in Cruz das Almas) is a Brazilian politician. He was president of Socialist Youth of the PDT in Maranhão (2001–2011) and general secretary of the National Union of Students (2003–2005).
