= Fabiano Alves =

Brazilian footballer (born 1994)

Personal information
- Full name: Fabiano Donato Alves
- Date of birth: 1 December 1994 (age 31)
- Place of birth: São Felipe, Brazil
- Height: 1.85 m (6 ft 1 in)
- Position: Defensive midfielder

Team information
- Current team: Rajasthan United FC

Senior career*
Years	Team	Apps	(Gls)
2013	Palmeiras B	5	(0)
2014	Bragantino	5	(1)
2015–2017	Corinthians	0	(0)
2015	→ Flamengo-SP (loan)	7	(1)
2016	→ Tigres do Brasil (loan)	13	(2)
2016	→ Londrina (loan)	1	(0)
2016	→ Boa (loan)	0	(0)
2017	→ Volta Redonda (loan)	3	(0)
2018–2019	Septemvri Sofia	38	(0)
2019–2021	St. Gallen	6	(1)
2021	Aimoré		
2021	Nitra		
- * Club domestic league appearances and goals

Fabiano Donato Alves (born 1 December 1994) is a Brazilian professional footballer who plays as a defensive midfielder for Indian 2nd division club Rajasthan United FC.

== Career ==
Fabiano was born in São Felipe, Brazil.

Fabiano joined Septemvri on 14 January 2018. He completed his debut for the team on 17 February 2018 in the first league match for the year, against Etar Veliko Tarnovo.

On 5 August 2021, he joined Nitra in Slovakia.
