= Parish Church of Our Lady of Help (Jaguaripe) =

Church in Jaguaripe, Brazil

- Igreja Matriz de Nossa Senhora da Ajuda
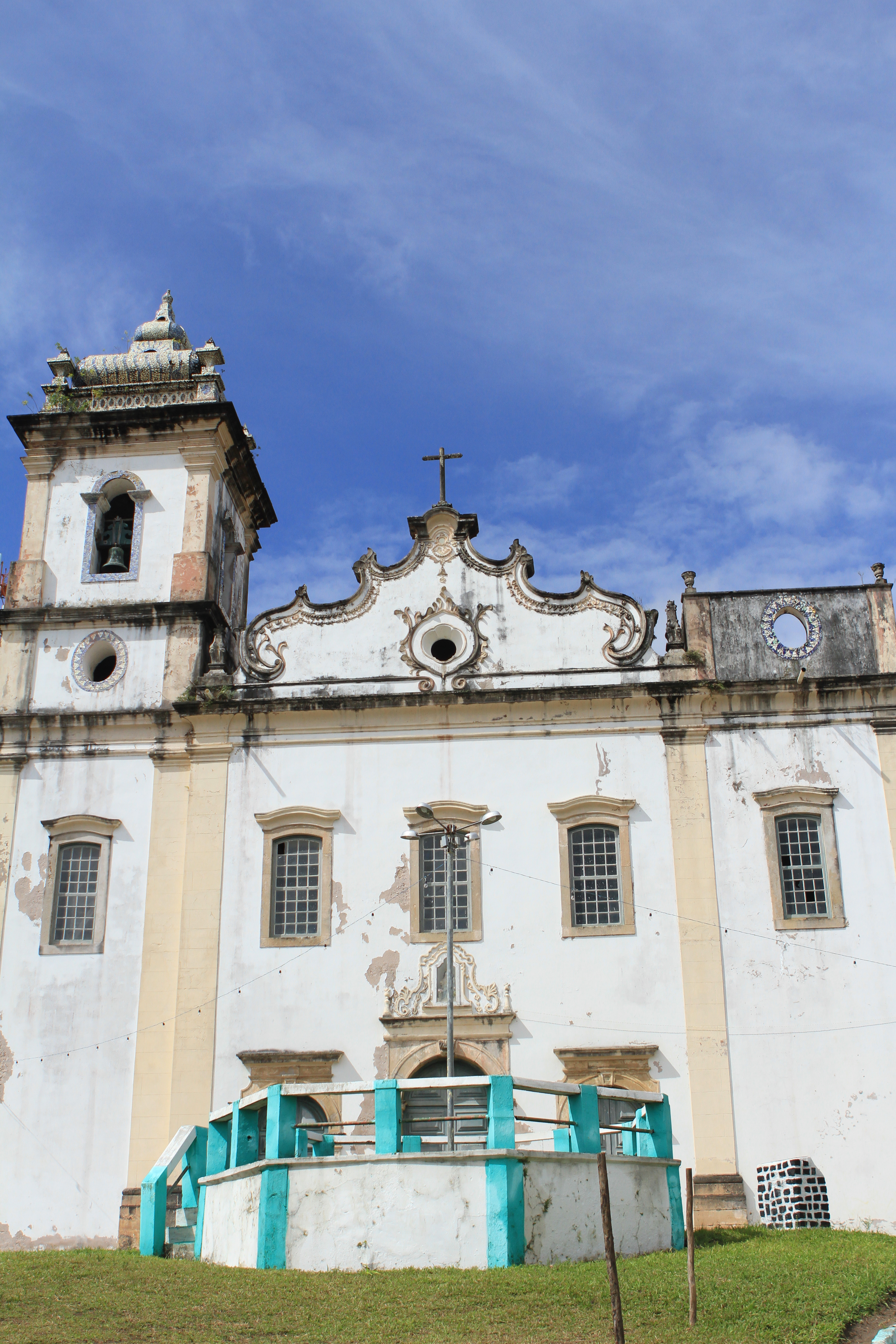
- Parish Church of Our Lady of Help, Jaguaripe, Bahia

- Location of the Parish Church of Our Lady of Help in Brazil

Religion
- Affiliation: Catholic
- Rite: Roman
- Ownership: Roman Catholic Archdiocese of São Salvador da Bahia
- Patron: Our Lady of Help

Location
- Municipality: Jaguaripe
- State: Bahia
- Country: Brazil
- Interactive map of Parish Church of Our Lady of Help
- Coordinates: 13.113989°S 38.895878°W

Architecture
- Style: Baroque, Neo-Classical
- Completed: 18th century

Specifications
- Direction of façade: South-East
- Interior area: 1,480 square metres (15,900 ft^{2})

The Parish Church of Our Lady of Help (Portuguese: Igreja Matriz de Nossa Senhora da Ajuda) is a 19th-century Roman Catholic church located in Jaguaripe, Bahia, Brazil. The church is dedicated to Our Lady of Help and belongs to the Roman Catholic Archdiocese of São Salvador da Bahia.

== History ==
The Parish Church of Our Lady of Help was built in the 18th century. It replaced a simple wattle and daub chapel and school built by the Jesuits in early 1700s; they arrived in present-day Jaguaripe from Salvador via Ilha dos Frades. It was renovated in the 19th century in the Neoclassical style, typical of church renovations in Bahia in the same century.

== Location ==
The Parish Church of Our Lady of Help is located at the highest point of the historic center of Jaguaripe. A winding, paved street connects Largo da Matriz, the church yard, to the Town Hall of Jaguaripe below. The church has broad views of the small historic center of Jaguaripe, the Jaguaripe River, and rolling hills of the region.

== Structure ==
The Parish Church of Our Lady of Help is constructed of lime and stone masonry and covers 1,480 square metres (15,900 ft^{2}). The division of the plan of the church into three sections (a nave and two side corridors) is emphasized on the façade by pilasters. The church has gable roofs, one on the central body and one over the sacristies. The façade has three portals with five windows at the choir level. Each of the windows has an arched lintel.

The church has a single bell tower with a bulbous dome. The church has a monumental, rococo-style pediment with volutes, a stylized oculus at center, and tracings in terra-cotta painted yellow. The church has three bronze bells with heavy wooden bell yolks painted green.

The church opens to a broad church yard, now known as the Largo da Matriz. It has a concrete platform with small stair constructed in the 20th century. Two large yards are located to the sides of the church, a feature not found in other churches of the region.

=== Interior ===
The interior of the church consists of a nave and side corridors surmounted by tribunes, a plan typical of Bahian churches of the 18th century. The church has two side chapels at the front of the church, one dedicated to the Blessed Sacrament. The church, somewhat unusually, has two sacristies, one on side of the chancel. The sacristies are accessed via the chancel and side chapels. The high altars and side altars are in the Neoclassical style with talha dourado, or gilded wood carvings; they replace the baroque altars of the original structures. The church interior once had numerous baroque-style paintings; they were removed during renovations of the church in the 18th century. The church has numerous examples of wood carving, including those located in the chancel, tribune handrails, a screen of the side chapel dedicated to the Blessed Sacrament, the chancel, and the tribune handrail.

=== Sacristies ===
The sacristies of the Parish Church of Our Lady of Help retain their 18th-century appearance. They have carved rococo altarpieces, a sacristy cabinet, and built-in closets. One altar is in the style typical during the reign of John V of Portugal. Its design is based on an altar originally in the Monastery of St. Benedict (Salvador) in Salvador and now located in the Church and Monastery of Our Lady of Monserrate. The other is in the late Rococo style, and is similar to that found in the Parish Church of Our Lady of Pilar in Salvador.

== Access ==
The Parish Church of Our Lady of Help is open to the public and may be visited.
