= Nazaré, Bahia =

Municipality of Bahia, Brazil

Nazaré
- Municipality
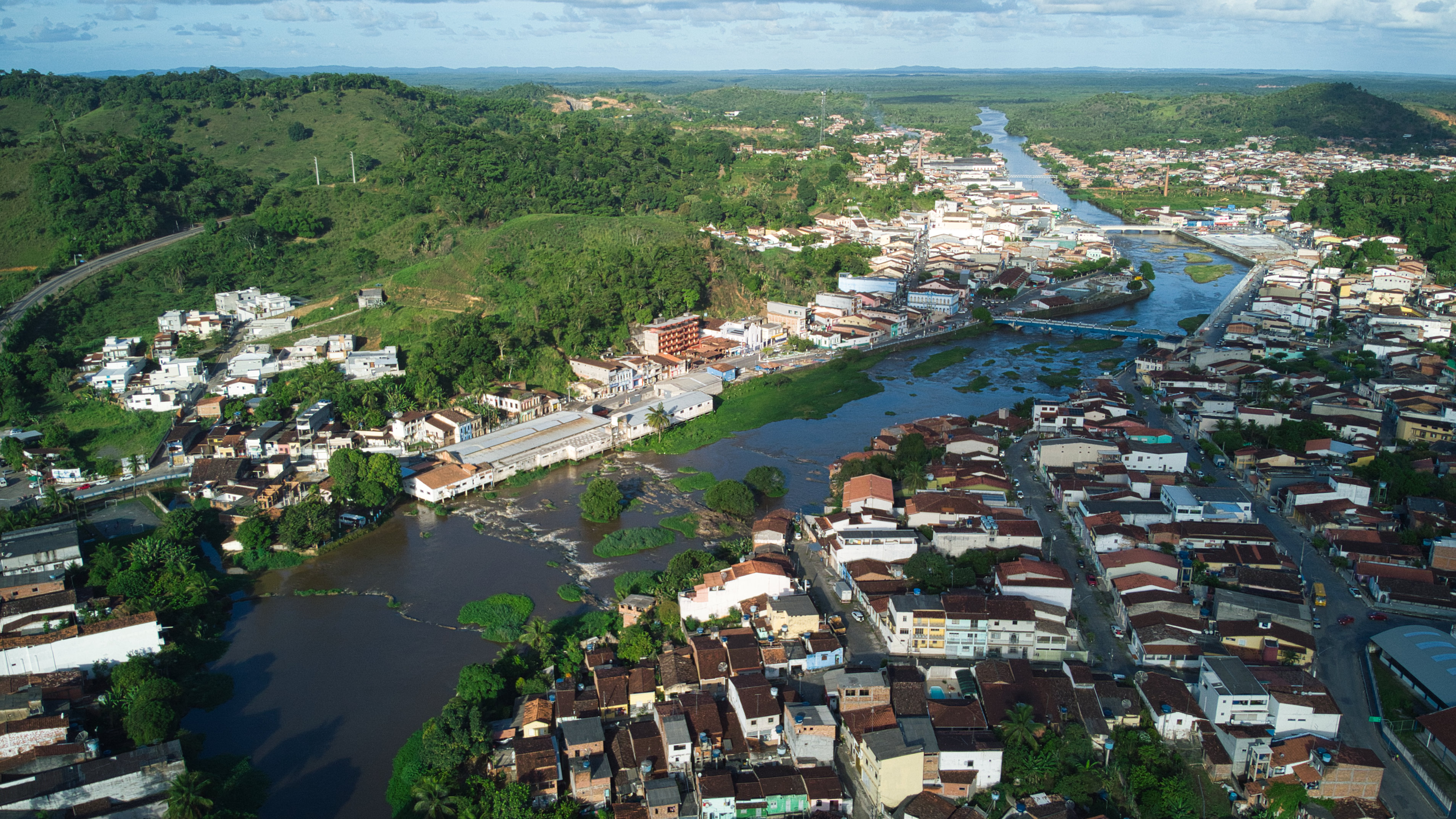
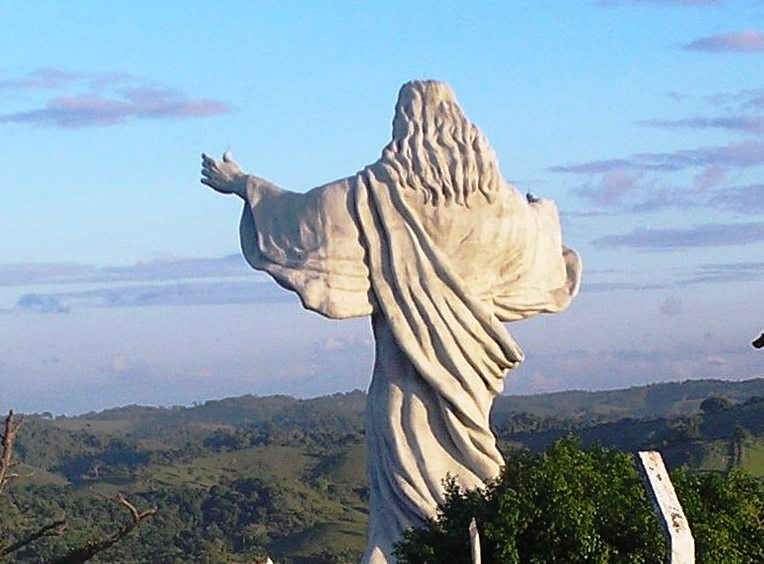
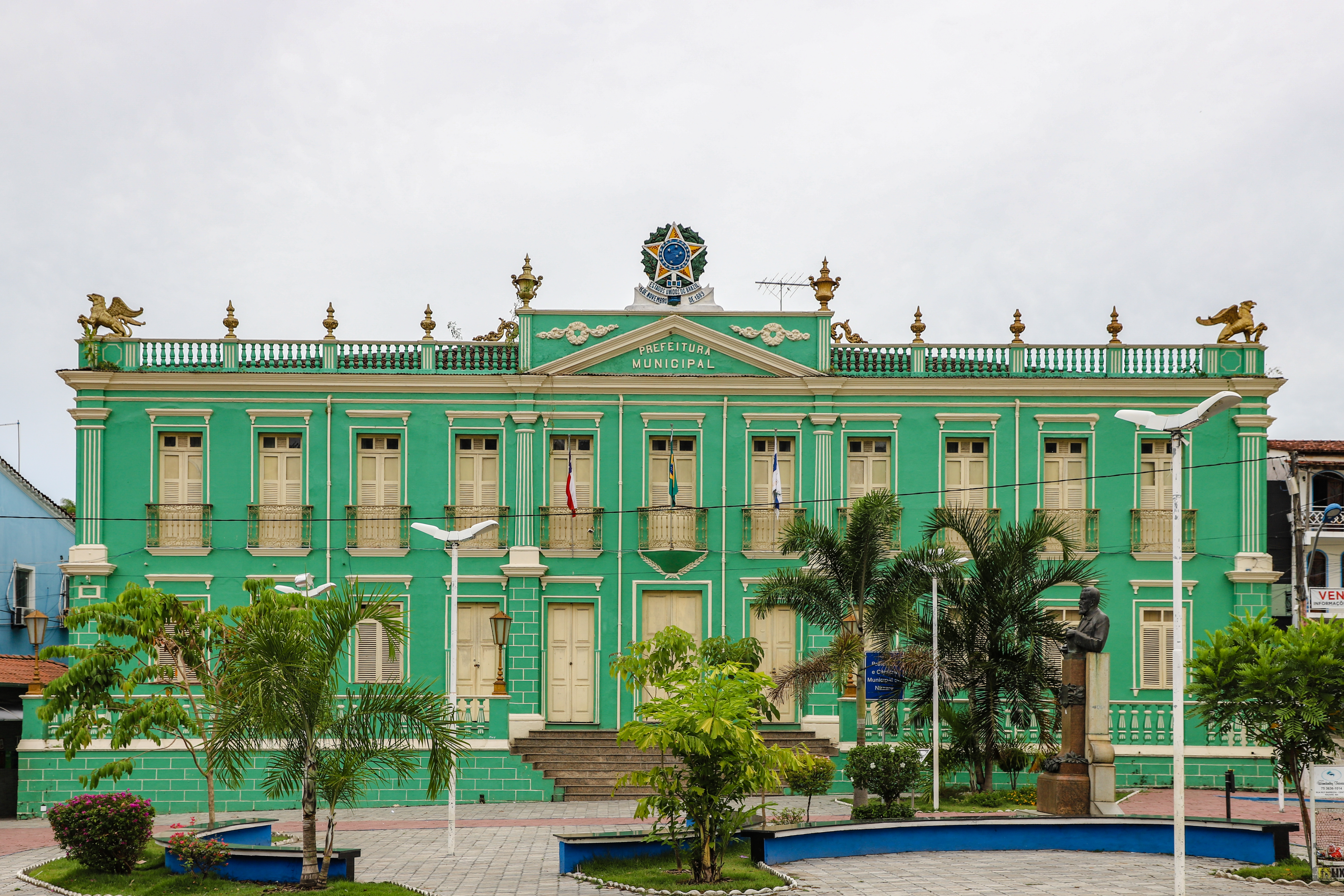
- City Christh monument City hall

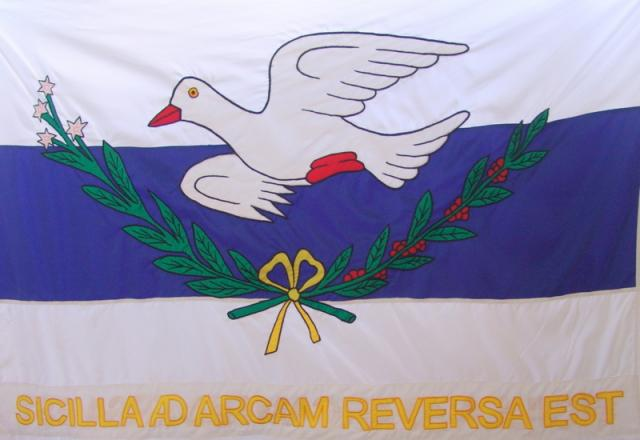
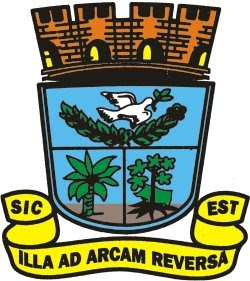
- Flag Coat of arms

- Location of Nazaré in Bahia

- Location in Brazil
- Coordinates: 13°02′06″S 39°00′50″W
- Country: Brazil
- Region: Nordeste
- State: Bahia
- Established: 1572

Government
  - Mayor: Benom Cardoso

Area
  - Total: 107.6 sq mi (278.6 km^{2})
- Elevation: 128 ft (39 m)

Population (2020 (est.))
  - Total: 28,594
- Time zone: UTC−3 (BRT)

Nazaré, also known as Nazaré das Farinhas, is a municipality in the state of Bahia in the North-East region of Brazil. The municipality has a population of 28,594 with a population density of 107 inhabitants per square kilometer. It is located 110 km (68 mi) from the state capital of Bahia, Salvador. Nazaré is within the Bahian Recôncavo, an interior region of the state of Bahia. It borders the municipalities of Muniz Ferreira, Aratuípe, Jaguaripe, São Felipe, and Maragogipe. The Jaguaripe River crosses through the middle of the town. It is sits on the intersection of two Bahian state highways, BA-001 and BA-046.

Along with the cities of Cachoeira, Jaguaripe, Salvador, and Santo Amaro, Nazaré is one of the pioneering cities in the process of colonial settlement in Brazil and Bahia.

== History ==
Nazaré was settled by the Tupinambá people. Portuguese settlers arrived in the second half of the sixteenth century. Fernão Cabral de Ataíde settled on the right bank of the Jaguaripe River, and called the settlement the Sesmaria de Jaguaripe.

== Economy ==
Nazaré is noted for its production of palm oil, cachaça, and ceramics. The town also supports a small fishing industry.

== Historic structures ==
Nazaré is home to several colonial-period historic structures, some designated as Brazilian national monuments by the National Historic and Artistic Heritage Institute.

- Chapel of Our Lady of the Conception (Igreja Matriz de Nossa Senhora de Nazaré)
- Chapel of Our Lady of Nazareth at Camamu (Igreja de Nossa Senhora de Nazaré de Camamú)
- Chapel of Our Lady of the Conception (Igreja de Nossa Senhora da Conceição)

The Cine Teatro Rio Branco is the oldest functioning cinema in Brazil.

== See also ==
- List of municipalities in Bahia
