= Amanda Paranaguá Dória =

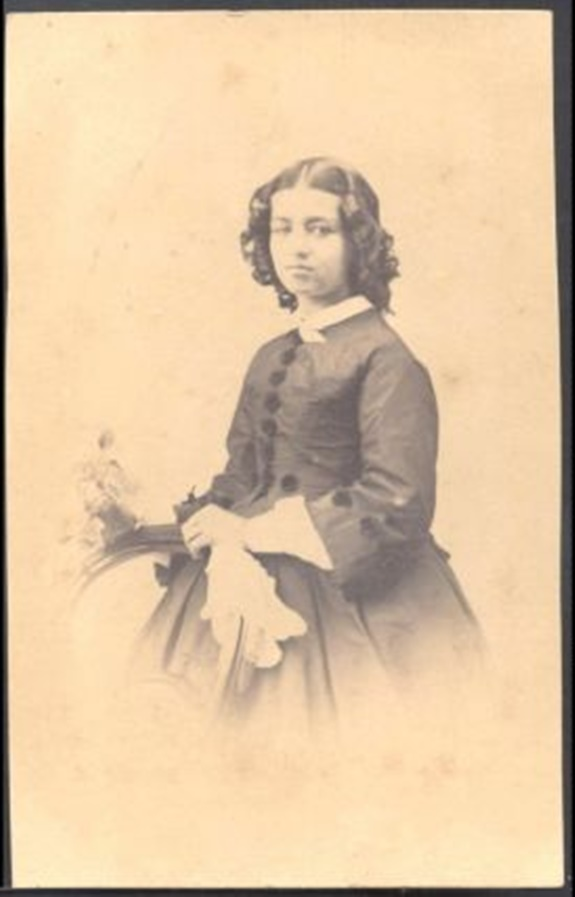
- Born: Maria Amanda Lustosa da Cunha Paranaguá; June 12, 1849

Maria Amanda Lustosa da Cunha Paranaguá (Salvador, Bahia, 12 June 1849 – Rio de Janeiro, 15 August 1931), was a lady-in-waiting for Brazil's Princess Isabel and the Baroness of Loreto.

== Biography ==
Maria Amanda Lustosa da Cunha Paranaguá, called Amanda or Amandinha by her friends, was born on June 12, 1849 in Salvador, Bahia. Her father was João Lustosa da Cunha Paranaguá, the Second Marquês of Paranaguá.

In 1862, Amanda lost the sight in her right eye after an incident where Princess Isabel accidentally hit her with a stick while gardening.

Amanda married lawyer and politician Franklin Américo de Meneses Dória on 30 May 1868. Franklin was a native of Ilha dos Frades, Bahia.

After the proclamation of the Brazilian Republic in 1889, Amanda and her husband accompanied the Brazilian royal family into exile in France. Her personal journal of this voyage provides a first-hand account of this event and its aftermath. The couple only returned to Rio de Janeiro in August 1890. Amanda died at age 82, in Rio de Janeiro, and was buried in the São João Batista Cemetery.

== Political and Social Activism ==
Beginning in the 1880s, Amanda began supporting the abolitionist cause, contributing her political influence and financial resources to support freedom for enslaved Brazilians. She was a friend of important Brazilian abolitionists including André Rebouças and Machado de Assis.

Amanda also supported literacy campaigns for poor children and orphans, which led journalist Valentim Magalhães calling her the "Mother of the Illiterate" (Portuguese, "Mãe dos Analfabetos").

For her strong work against Brazilian slavery and her support of Princess Isabel, Amanda and her husband were rewarded by being named the Baron and Baroness of Loreto in a royal dispatch on June 15, 1888.
