= Bahia State University =

University in Bahia, Brazil

Coordinates: 23°33′S 46°38′W

State University of Bahia
- Universidade do Estado da Bahia
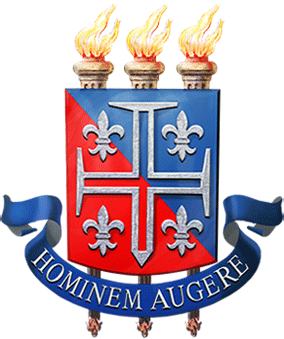
- Shield of the Bahia State University
- Other names: UNEB
- Motto: Hominem Augere (Latin)
- Motto in English: For the betterment of man.
- Type: Public university
- Established: 1983
- Rector: José Bites
- Location: Salvador, Camaçari, Jacobina, Santo Antônio de Jesus, Juazeiro, Barreiras, Alagoinhas, Caetité, Senhor do Bonfim, Paulo Afonso, Teixeira de Freitas, Serrinha, Guanambi, Itaberaba, Valença, Irecê. Bom Jesus da Lapa, Conceição do Coité, Eunapólis, Brumado, Ipiaú, Euclides da Cunha, Seabra, Xique-Xique, Bahia, Brazil
- Colors: Blue & red
- Website: /www.uneb.br

State University of Bahia (Portuguese: Universidade do Estado da Bahia, UNEB) is a public university in the Brazilian state of Bahia.

Founded in 1983, the university regrouped existing schools in the state of Bahia. The university is included Technical Education Center of Bahia, the Faculty of Agronomy of the Middle San Francisco (Brazilian river), the schools of education of Alagoinhas, Jacobina, and Santo Antônio de Jesus, and the Faculties of Philosophy, Sciences and Letters of Caetité a Juazeiro.

== Academics ==
=== Rankings ===
Maximum Score in student participation

Quacquarelli Symonds uses its own methodology to carry out the study, with data collection in higher education institutions and to data provided by the Organization for Economic Cooperation and Development (OCED), which brings together 34 countries worldwide.

The QS evaluates issues such as academic reputation – are applied 15,000 questionnaires with academic – employability reputation (evaluates the image with companies and government agencies employers of graduates), titration of teachers, published articles, citations in academic papers, impact on internet in addition to the degree of participation and student satisfaction regarding the university.

In this last criterion – participation and satisfaction of students – the UNEB even more highlights: Could maximum score (100 points) reaching the top position among the university in Brazil and the fourth place among the institutions in Latin America.

=== Research and postgraduate ===
The university also took the lead in Bahia in the issue citations in academic papers, leaving the Ufba second. Among the Latin institutions the UNEB figure in 31st place.

According to the Dean of Graduate Studies (PPG), José Cláudio Rocha, the result shows the growth of the institution's investments in research. "The quality of work undertaken within the university is growing every day. We are evolving much in the scientific literature and began to figure prominently in international studies, "celebrated José Cláudio.

The ex-rector Lourisvaldo Valentim also held the prominent position of UNEB the ranking QS Top Universities, congratulating the joint efforts of the entire academic community in the 24 campuses of the university to this result. "We are all to be congratulated. Students, teachers, researchers, servers and managers, all contribute their part to this significant growth of our institution ", celebrated Valentim.

The rector also highlighted some numbers that explain the development of UNEB, "Since 2006, we invested more than R $35 million in research and strict post-graduate studies, increasing the number of masters and doctoral degrees, as well as enough enlarge the areas of research ". Currently the university has 200 research groups on all campuses totaling 1 200 researchers. In just over five years UNEB also jumped a sensu graduate strict 12 master's degrees and offered three doctorates.

=== Divisions ===
Salvador Campus I

Salvador Campus-I have following four departments.

- Department of Humanities (DCH)
- Department of Life Sciences (DCV)
- Department of Education (DEDC)
- Department of Exact Sciences and Earth (DCET)

Alagoinhas Campus II

- Department of Education (DEDC)
- Department of Exact Sciences and Earth (DCET)

Juazeiro Campus III

- Department of Humanities (DCH)
- Department of Technology and Social Sciences (DCTS)

Jacobina Campus IV

- Department of Humanities (DCH)

Santo Antônio de Jesus Campus V

- Department of Humanities (DCH)

Caetité Campus VI

- Department of Humanities (DCH)

Senhor do Bonfim Campus VII

- Department of Education (DEDC)

Paulo Afonso Campus VIII

- Department of Humanities (DCH)

Barreiras Campus IX

- Department of Humanities (DCH)

Teixeira de Freitas Campus X

- Department of Education (DEDC)

Serrinha Campus XI

- Department of Education (DEDC)

Guanambi Campus XII

- Department of Education (DEDC)

Itaberaba Campus XIII

- Department of Education (DEDC)

Conceição do Coité Campus XIV

- Department of Education (DEDC)

Valença Campus XV

- Department of Education (DEDC)

Irecê Campus XVI

- Department of Humanities and Technologies (DCHT)

Bom Jesus da Lapa Campus XVII

- Department of Humanities and Technologies (DCHT)

Eunapólis Campus XVIII

- Department of Humanities and Technologies (DCHT)

Camaçari Campus XIX

- Department of Humanities and Technologies (DCHT)

Brumado Campus XX

- Department of Humanities and Technologies (DCHT)

Ipiaú Campus XXI

- Department of Humanities and Technologies (DCHT)

Euclides da Cunha Campus XXII

- Department of Humanities and Technologies (DCHT)

Seabra Campus XXIII

- Department of Humanities and Technologies (DCHT)

Xique-Xique Campus XXIV

- Department of Humanities and Technologies (DCHT)

== See also ==
- List of state universities in Brazil
- Southwest Bahia State University (UESB)
- Rankings of universities in Brazil
- Universities and Higher Education in Brazil
