= Brazilian Agricultural Research Corporation =

Government-owned research corporation

Empresa Brasileira de Pesquisa Agropecuária - Embrapa
- Company type: State-owned enterprise
- Industry: Agricultural research; Agriculture
- Founded: 07 December 1972 (Law n. 5851/72); 26 April 1973 (registration)
- Headquarters: Brasília, DF, Brazil
- Area served: Nationwide, worldwide
- Key people: Silvia Massruhá (President)
- Number of employees: 9790
- Website: embrapa.br

The Brazilian Agricultural Research Corporation (Embrapa - Portuguese: Empresa Brasileira de Pesquisa Agropecuária) is a state-owned research corporation affiliated with the Brazilian Ministry of Agriculture. Since its inception on April 26, 1973, it has been devoted to developing technologies, knowledge and technical-scientific information aimed at Brazilian agriculture, including livestock.

Their mission is to "develop research, development and innovation solutions for the sustainability of agriculture, for the benefit of Brazilian society".

Embrapa's organizational structure is composed of 46 centers that can be divided into Research Units or Service Units, and of 17 Central Units that comprise the corporation's headquarters. Such research centers are distributed throughout the country in nearly all Brazilian states. The corporation currently employs over 9,790 people, of which 2,444 are researchers.

Embrapa is part of the National Agricultural Research System (SNPA - Sistema Nacional de Pesquisa Agropecuária), which also comprises federal and state public institutions, universities, private companies, and foundations, which cooperate to conduct research in different geographical areas and fields of knowledge.

== International cooperation ==
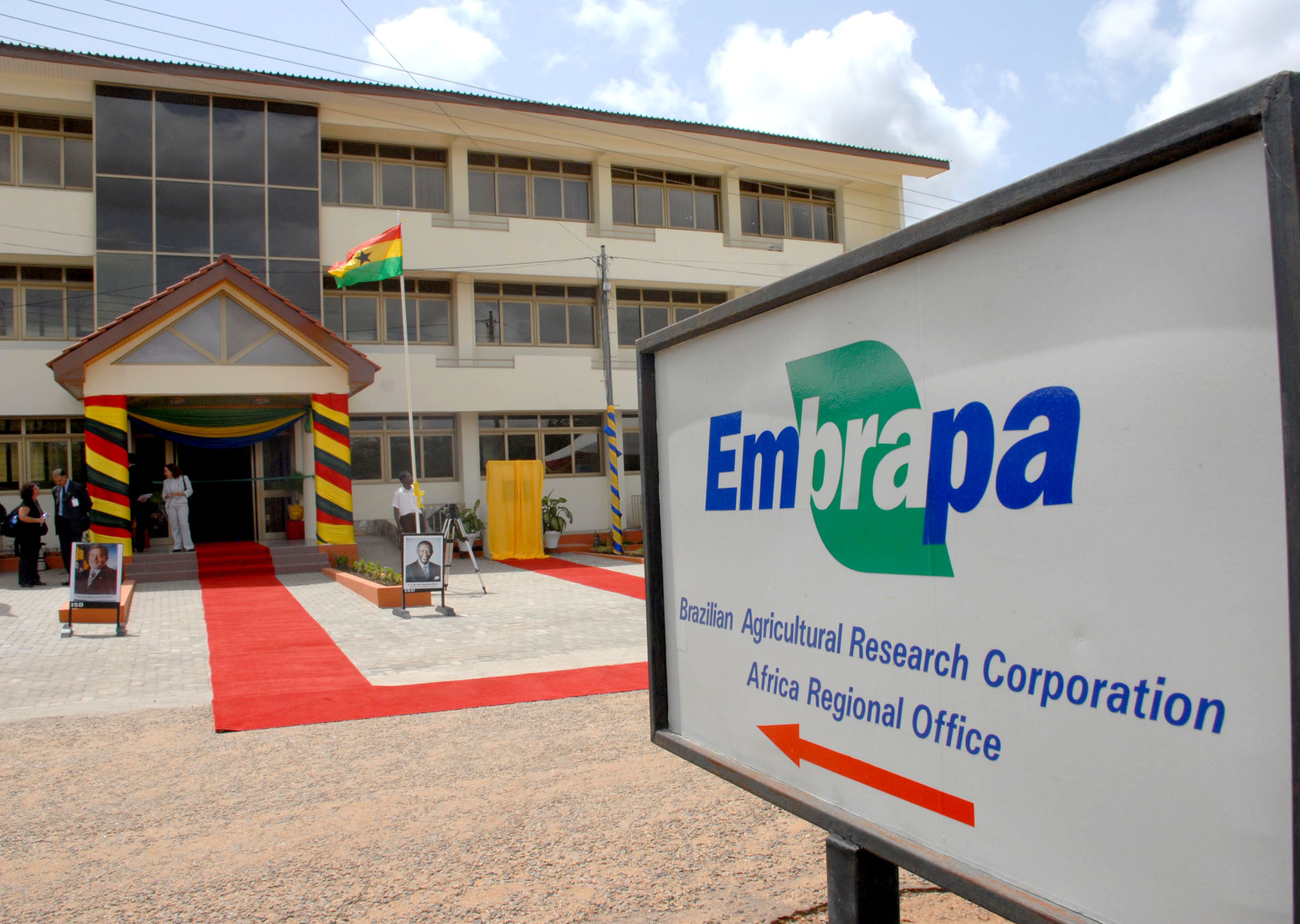
Africa Regional Office in Ghana

In terms of international cooperation, Embrapa has bilateral agreements for technical cooperation with a number of countries and institutions, and multilateral agreements with international organizations, especially concerning joint research activities.

It also has established their Labex (Laboratórios Virtuais no Exterior or Virtual Laboratories Abroad) to develop research and prospect trends in the United States, France, United Kingdom, Netherlands and South Korea. There is an office in Ghana to disseminate scientific and technological knowledge in African countries, with plans for future offices in Panama and Venezuela aimed at Latin America.

== Embrapa Research Units ==
=== Product-based research centers ===
Embrapa Units whose work targets national or regional agricultural product chains.

- Embrapa Beef Cattle, Campo Grande, MS. Research and development for the beef cattle production chain.
- Embrapa Cassava & Tropical Fruits, Cruz das Almas, BA. Research and development for cassava and tropical fruit production chains.
- Embrapa Cotton, Campina Grande, PB. Research on cotton, castor oil plant, peanuts, sesame, and sisal.
- Embrapa Dairy Cattle, Juiz de Fora, MG. Research and development for the milk and dairy production chain.
- Embrapa Fisheries and Aquaculture, Palmas, TO.
- Embrapa Forestry, Colombo, PR. Research and development on cultivated and natural forests.
- Embrapa Goats and Sheep, Sobral, CE. Research and development on goats and sheep.
- Embrapa Grape & Wine, Bento Gonçalves, RS. Research on grapes, wine, apples, and other subtropical fruit.
- Embrapa Maize & Sorghum, Sete Lagoas, MG. Research and development for the production chains of maize, sorghum, and other tropical cereals.
- Embrapa Rice and Beans, Santo Antônio de Goiás, GO. Research and development for rice and bean production chains.
- Embrapa Soybean, Londrina, PR. Research and development on soybean, sunflowers and wheat.
- Embrapa Swine & Poultry, Concórdia, SC. Research and development for the swine and poultry production chains.
- Embrapa Vegetables, Distrito Federal, DF. Research and development for vegetable production chains.
- Embrapa Wheat, Passo Fundo, RS. Research on wheat, triticale, barley, rye, oats and soybeans.

=== Basic theme research centers ===
Embrapa units that work on basic themes that cut across several production chains, and support the other research centers.

- Embrapa Agriculture Informatics, Campinas, SP. Research on information technology for agribusiness.
- Embrapa Agrobiology, Seropédica, RJ. Research and development on soil biological processes (e.g. biological nitrogen fixation) and on agroecology.
- Embrapa Agroenergy, Brasília, DF. Research and development on energy production (e.g. biodiesel, biogas, etc.) based on agricultural raw materials (oils, fats, vegetable biomass, forests).
- Embrapa Environment, Jaguariúna, SP. Research on environmental management.
- Embrapa Food Agroindustry, Rio de Janeiro, RJ. Research on food technology.
- Embrapa Genetic Resources and Biotechnology, Brasília, DF. Research on biotechnology, biological control, genetic resources, and biological security.
- Embrapa Instrumentation, São Carlos, SP. Research on precision agriculture, biotechnology, process automation, new materials, family farming and family agroindustry, the environment, and the quality of products and raw materials.
- Embrapa Satellite Monitoring, Campinas, SP. Research on geographical information systems, electronic networks, and on the obtention and processing of satellite images and of field data.
- Embrapa Soils, Rio de Janeiro, RJ. Research on soils and soil-environment interactions.
- Embrapa Tropical Agroindustry, Fortaleza, CE. Research and development on the tropical fruit agroindustry (cropping, processing, storage).

=== Ecoregional research centers ===
Embrapa units that either work to perfect the agricultural production chains that are more relevant to a given region or biome, or to catalog, classify, assess, and conserve local natural resources.

- Embrapa Acre, Rio Branco, AC. Agroforestry systems, and on Acre state natural resources and production chains.
- Embrapa Agrosilvopastoral, Sinop, MT. Agrosilvopastoral systems (integrated crop-livestock-forestry systems).
- Embrapa Amapá, Macapá, AP.
- Embrapa Cerrados, Planaltina, DF. Cerrado agricultureand natural resources.
- Embrapa Coastal Tablelands, Aracaju, SE.
- Embrapa Cocais, São Luís, MA.
- Embrapa Eastern Amazon, Belém, PA. Eastern portion of the Amazon Biome.
- Embrapa Mid-North, Teresina, PI.
- Embrapa Pantanal, Corumbá, MS. Pantanal.
- Embrapa Rondônia, Porto Velho, RO.
- Embrapa Roraima, Boa Vista, RR.
- Embrapa Semi-Arid, Petrolina, PE. Brazilian semi-arid, especially for the Caatinga biome.
- Embrapa South Livestock, Bagé, RS. Meat and dairy cattle and sheep.
- Embrapa Southeast Livestock, São Carlos, SP. Beef and dairy cattle production chain and horse breeding in the Brazilian Southeast.
- Embrapa Temperate Agriculture, Pelotas, RS. Temperate climate regions of Brazil.
- Embrapa Western Region Agriculture, Dourados, MS. Western Brazil.
- Embrapa Western Amazon, Manaus, AM. Agroforestry systems, and on the natural resources and production chains in the Western portion of the Amazon Biome.
