= Federal University of Recôncavo da Bahia =

University in Brazil

Coordinates: 12.659°S 39.088°W

- Universidade Federal do Recôncavo da Bahia
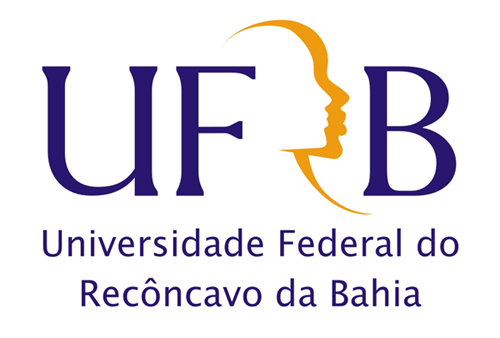
- Other name: UFRB
- Location: Cruz das Almas

The Federal University of Recôncavo da Bahia (Portuguese: Universidade Federal do Recôncavo da Bahia, UFRB) is a Brazilian university, with its main campus at Cruz das Almas, Bahia.

This university also has a campus at Amargosa, Cachoeira, Santo Antônio de Jesus, Feira de Santana e Santo Amaro .

The university was created by the law 11.151, in 2005. In 2011 was announced a new campus in the city of Feira de Santana, and estimated to be operating at the beginning of 2013.

== Alumni ==
Hamangai Pataxo, climate activist, was a student of veterinary science here in 2024.

== See also ==
- Recôncavo da Bahia region in Brazil (Portuguese Wikipedia)
