= Cruz das Almas =

Municipality in Northeast of Brazil

- Municipality
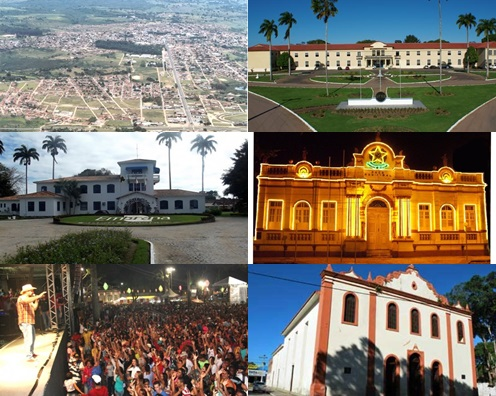
- Landscape of the city, Rectory of Federal University of Recôncavo da Bahia, EMBRAPA Cassava & Fruits headquarters, City Hall, Saint John Festival and Cathedral Church

- Flag Coat of arms

- Location in Bahia state

- Location in Brazil
- Coordinates: 12°40′29.9″S 39°06′9.9″W
- Country: Brazil
- Region: Northeast
- State: Bahia
- Mesoregion: Metropolitana de Salvador
- Microregion: Santo Antônio de Jesus

Government
  - Mayor: Ednaldo José Ribeiro (Republicans)

Area
  - Total: 145.74 km^{2} (56.27 sq mi)
- Elevation: 212 m (696 ft)

Population (2022)
  - Total: 60,348
  - Density: 433.79/km^{2} (1,123.5/sq mi)
- Time zone: UTC−3 (BRT)
- Postal code: 44380000
- Area code: +55 75
- HDI: 0,699
- Website: www.cruzdasalmas.ba.gov.br (in Portuguese)

Cruz das Almas (translation: Souls' Cross) is a municipality, in the state of Bahia, in Brazil. Founded in 1897, it is home to the Federal University of Recôncavo da Bahia and is one of the main cities of Bahia.

In 2022, it had a population of 60,348 inhabitants. Its climate is tropical, hot and humid. The economy is based on agriculture, especially tobacco, citrus fruits (oranges and Tahiti lime) and cassava production.

It is also home of the Embrapa Cassava & Fruits. Cruz das Almas is well known for its Saint John Festival in June, where fireworks are used as "espadas" in a beautiful but dangerous game.

== Population history ==
Year	Population
2017	64,932
2020	63,591
2022	60,348

== Neighboring municipalities ==
- Feira de Santana
- Santo Antônio de Jesus
- Castro Alves, Bahia

== Persons ==
Famous persons includes the featherweight boxer Sertão.

== Climate ==
Climate data for Cruz das Almas (1981–2010)
Month	Jan	Feb	Mar	Apr	May	Jun	Jul	Aug	Sep	Oct	Nov	Dec	Year
Mean daily maximum °C (°F)	31.8 (89.2)	31.9 (89.4)	31.3 (88.3)	29.4 (84.9)	28.0 (82.4)	26.2 (79.2)	25.9 (78.6)	26.0 (78.8)	27.5 (81.5)	29.3 (84.7)	30.3 (86.5)	31.3 (88.3)	29.1 (84.4)
Daily mean °C (°F)	25.8 (78.4)	25.9 (78.6)	25.8 (78.4)	24.7 (76.5)	23.6 (74.5)	22.2 (72.0)	21.6 (70.9)	21.5 (70.7)	22.5 (72.5)	23.9 (75.0)	24.9 (76.8)	25.5 (77.9)	24.0 (75.2)
Mean daily minimum °C (°F)	21.7 (71.1)	21.9 (71.4)	22.0 (71.6)	21.5 (70.7)	20.6 (69.1)	19.3 (66.7)	18.4 (65.1)	18.3 (64.9)	19.0 (66.2)	20.2 (68.4)	21.3 (70.3)	21.7 (71.1)	20.5 (68.9)
Average precipitation mm (inches)	63.0 (2.48)	70.2 (2.76)	97.5 (3.84)	136.5 (5.37)	122.8 (4.83)	142.6 (5.61)	122.8 (4.83)	91.3 (3.59)	79.6 (3.13)	54.8 (2.16)	76.8 (3.02)	59.5 (2.34)	1,117.4 (43.99)
Average precipitation days (≥ 1.0 mm)	7	6	10	13	14	17	18	15	11	7	7	6	131
Average relative humidity (%)	74.9	75.2	79.0	84.3	86.3	87.9	86.4	84.1	81.7	78.0	77.9	75.8	81.0
Mean monthly sunshine hours	227.9	204.7	208.3	190.6	179.5	143.6	171.2	176.5	186.4	200.9	192.4	200.7	2,282.7
Source: Instituto Nacional de Meteorologia
