= Jaguaripe River =

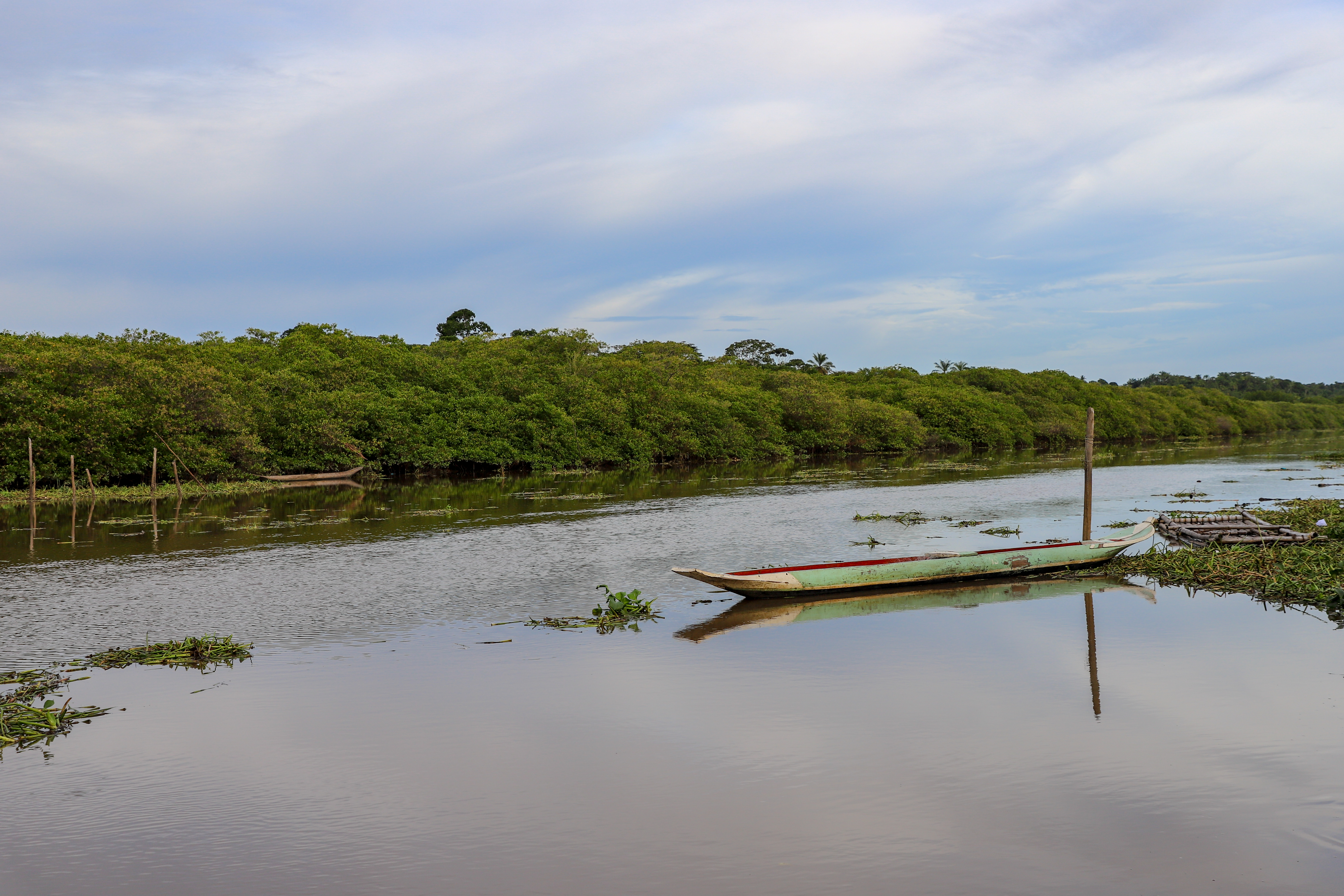
- Mangroves along the Jaguaripe River, Maragogipinho

- Location of mouth
- Native name: Rio Jaguaripe (Portuguese)

Location
- Country: Brazil
- States: Bahia
- Region: South America

Physical characteristics
- Length: 107 km (66 mi)
- Basin size: 2,200 km^{2} (850 sq mi)

The Jaguaripe River (Brazilian Portuguese: Rio Jaguaripe) is a river located in Bahia, Brazil. It is administered by the state of Bahia under Region of Planning and Water Management IX, the Recôncavo Sul. The river derives its name from the Tupi language term îagûarype, meaning "in the river of jaguars" (îagûara, jaguar + 'y, river + pe, em). The river extends 107 kilometres (66 mi) from the municipality Castro Alves and empties into the Bay of All Saints. It is one of three large rivers that flow into the bay, the others being the Paraguaçu and the Subaé. The Rio da Dona flows parallel to the Jaguaripe, and joins its near the mouth of the bay.

The river basin was home to speakers of Macro-Jê languages, ancient inhabitants of the Recôncavo Baiano region. They were expelled by the Tupi people, who emerged from the Amazon in approximately the 11th century. The Portuguese arrived in the 16th century and encountered Tupinambá settlements. The river became home to important commercial centers, with Nazare das Farinhas near its source; Maragogipinho, a district of Aratuípe to the southeast; and Jaguaripe near the mouth of the river at the Bay of All Saints.

The river has rich stands of mangroves among much of its lengths, as well as several small islands: the Paraíso, Carapeba, Santo Antônio de Jiribatuba, and Matarandiba. The Jaguaripe terminates at the Funil Bridge, which connects the Bahian mainland to the island of Itaparica.
