= Santo Antônio de Jesus =

- Municipality

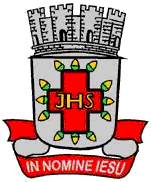
- Flag Coat of arms

- Location in Bahia state

- Location in Brazil
- Coordinates: 12°58′9″S 39°15′40″W
- Country: Brazil
- Region: Northeast
- State: Bahia
- Mesoregion: Metropolitana de Salvador
- Microregion: Santo Antônio de Jesus

Area
  - Total: 261.35 km^{2} (100.91 sq mi)

Population (2022 Census)
  - Total: 103,055
  - Estimate (2025): 109,791
  - Density: 394.32/km^{2} (1,021.3/sq mi)
- Time zone: UTC−3 (BRT)

Santo Antônio de Jesus is a city in the eastern part of the state of Bahia, Brazil, located west of the state capital Salvador. It is part of the mesoregion Metropolitana de Salvador. The population is 103,055 (2022 Census) in an area of 261.35 km^{2}. It is an important commercial and a service centre in the micro-region.

== Neighboring municipalities ==
- Aratuípe
- Laje
- São Miguel das Matas
- Varzedo

== Population history ==
Year	Population
2004	84,057
2006	86,876
2015	101,548
2020	102,380

== Notable people ==
Notable people include Júnior, a five-time champion for the Brazil national football team of football (soccer).

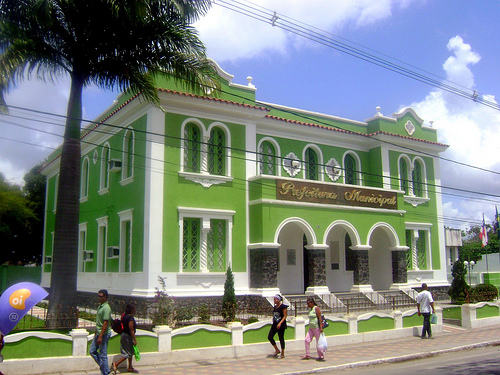
City hall of Santo Antonio de Jesus, Bahia

== See also ==
- List of municipalities in Bahia
