= Itatim =

Municipality of Bahia State, Brazil

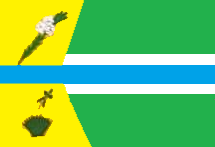
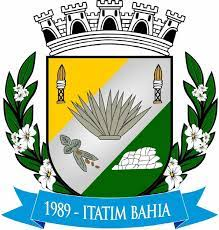
- Flag Coat of arms

- Coordinates: 12°42′43″S 39°41′52″W
- Region: Nordeste
- State: Bahia
- Founded: 20 July 1962

Population (2020)
  - Total: 14,539
- Time zone: UTC−3 (BRT)
- Postal code: 2916856

Itatim is a municipality in the state of Bahia in the North-East region of Brazil. It is roughly 200km from the state capital Salvador.

Its distinctive terrain—particularly the many Gneiss mountains—makes it a popular place for outdoor sport climbing. One of the most unique rock formations is the 180-meter high Paredão do Morro da Toca with its distinctive arches, which boasts many hiking and climbing routes.

== See also ==
- List of municipalities in Bahia
