= Ilha dos Frades =

Island in the Bay of all Saints

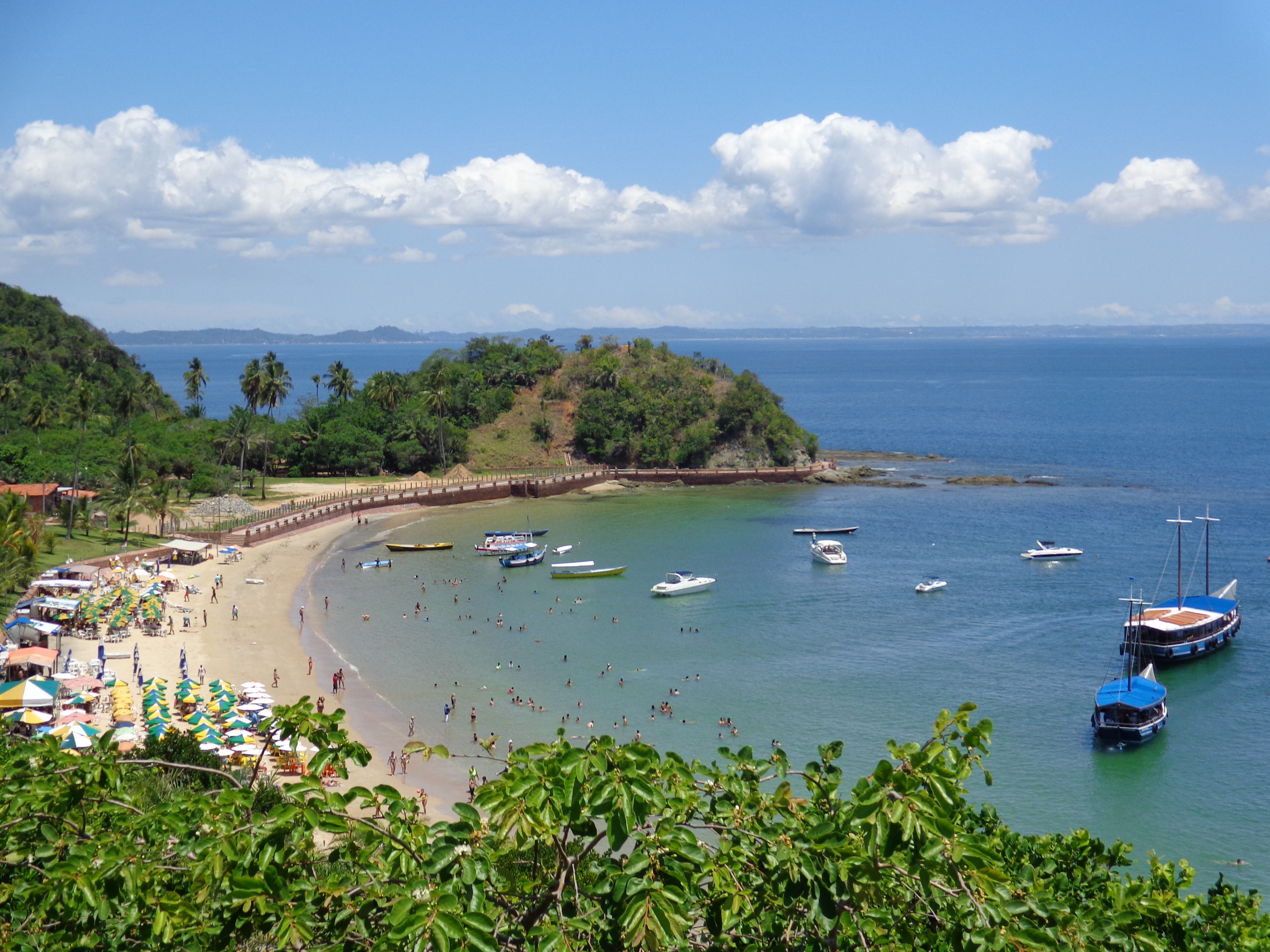

- Location within Brazil

Geography
- Location: Bay of All Saints
- Coordinates: 12°47′03″S 38°38′12″W

Administration
- Brazil
- State: Brazil
- City: Salvador

Ilha dos Frades (English: Isle of the Friars) is an island in the Bay of All Saints. It is administered as part of the city of Salvador in the state of Bahia. The island is located in the center of the bay. It is 6 kilometres (3.7 mi) in length, covers 1.335 hectares (3.30 acres), and shaped like a fifteen-pointed star. Ilha dos Frades has preserved vegetation of the Atlantic Forest (Mata Atlântica), including native Brazil wood. The island is protected as part of the Environmental Protection Area of the Bay of All Saints.

Ilha dos Frades served as an important part of the slave trade in Bahia. Enslaved Africans were transported from the port at Salvador to the interior Recôncavo region of Bahia. The island became part of the illegal slave trade in Brazil in the 19th century; enslaved people were brought directly to the island and led to the interior of Bahia. The practice only ended with the abolition of slavery in Brazil in 1888.

== Etymology ==
The name of the island, which translates to "Island of the Friars" refers to the murder of two friars murdered by the Tupinambá people early in the Portuguese colonial period. The friars traveled to the Ilha dos Frades in order to catechize and ultimately disappeared.

== History ==
By the early 18th century, the island belonged to João Nogueira. Nogueira lived on the island with six or seven tenant farmers. The island had streams too small to support sugar cane cultivation; the tenant farmers only raised cows and pigs and grew subsistence crops. Francisco da Costa is recorded as an early owner of the island; he constructed the first Chapel of Loreto, or Church of Our Lady of Loreto (Igreja de Nossa Senhora de Loreto) in 1645. It was reconstructed in a new location in 1756. The Ilha dos Frades played an important part in the illegal slave trade in Bahia in the 19th century. Illegal landings were made at the Ilha da Itaparica and Ilha da Mare and enslaved people were led directly to the interior of Bahia, a practice that only ended with the abolition of slavery in Brazil in 1888.

Franklin Américo de Meneses Dória, the Baron of Loreto, was born on the Ilha dos Frades in 1836. Loreto was a lawyer, politician, poet, and founding member of the Academia Brasileira de Letras. Gabriel Viana, a plantation owner, ruled the island in the manner of a feudal lord during the República Velha, or First Brazilian Republic (1889-1930). Viana alternately decided on the punishment and execution of residents of the island and served as a benefactor of the local community.

== Communities ==
- Paramana, the main settlement of the island, population 900. It has a police station, a health clinic, beach huts, some restaurants, a small shop and a guest house. The Church of Our Lady of Loreto and a century-old house are located near the settlement.
- Ponta de Nossa Senhora de Guadalupe, population 45. The settlement has beaches, handicraft stalls, an old mansion and a church that dates to the seventeenth century.
- Costa de Fora, population 150. It has an inn, an old church obscured by vegetation, and some hidden waterfalls in the remaining Atlantic Forest. It also has the only cemetery on the island.

== Cultural monuments ==
- Church of Our Lady of Guadalupe, 17th century
- Chapel of Loreto, 18th century
- Church of Our Lady of Bom Parto
- Lighthouse of the Ilha dos Frades, a lighthouse on the hill behind Ponta de Nossa Senhora beach
- Ruins of a lazaretto, a warehouse where enslaved Africans were quarantined to gain weight before being sold.

== Access ==
Access to the island is from the nearby island of Madre de Deus, or by private boat from Salvador.
