= Laje =

Municipality of Bahia, Brazil

Coordinates: 13°10′55″S 39°25′30″W

- Municipality
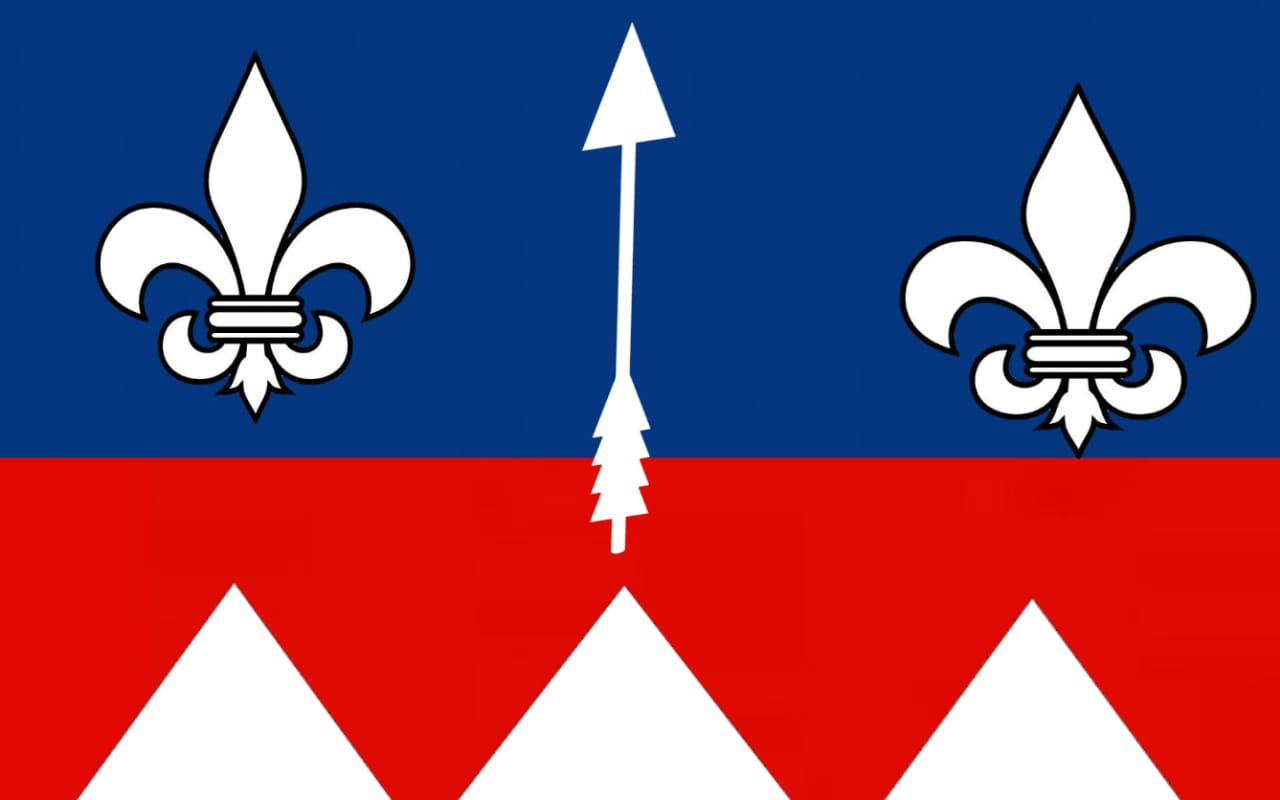
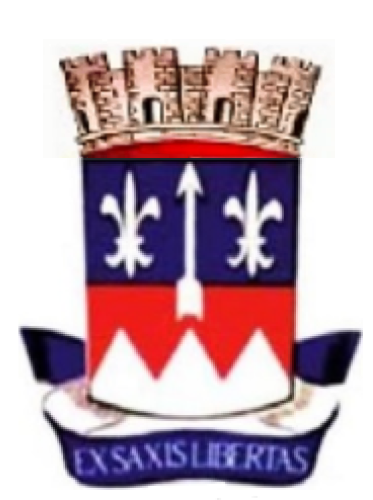
- Flag Coat of arms
- Interactive map of Laje
- Country: Brazil
- Region: Nordeste
- State: Bahia

Population (2020)
  - Total: 24,032
- Time zone: UTC−3 (BRT)

Laje is a municipality in the state of Bahia in the North-East region of Brazil.

== See also ==
- List of municipalities in Bahia
