= São Felipe =

Coordinates: 12°50′49″S 39°05′20″W

- Municipality
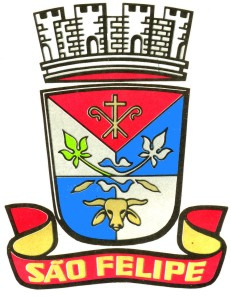
- Flag Coat of arms
- Interactive map of São Felipe
- Country: Brazil
- Region: Nordeste
- State: Bahia

Population (2020)
  - Total: 21,080
- Time zone: UTC−3 (BRT)

São Felipe is a municipality in the state of Bahia in the North-East region of Brazil.

== See also ==
- List of municipalities in Bahia
