= São Miguel das Matas =

Coordinates: 13°01′S 39°27′W

- Municipality
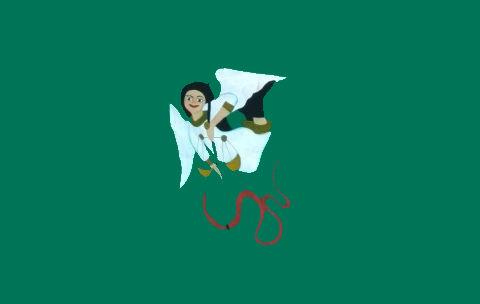
- Flag
- Interactive map of São Miguel das Matas
- Country: Brazil
- Region: Nordeste
- State: Bahia

Population (2020)
  - Total: 11,704
- Time zone: UTC−3 (BRT)

São Miguel das Matas is a municipality in the state of Bahia in the North-East region of Brazil.

== See also ==
- List of municipalities in Bahia
