= Bay of All Saints =

Bay in Brazil

Bay of All Saints Baía de Todos os Santos
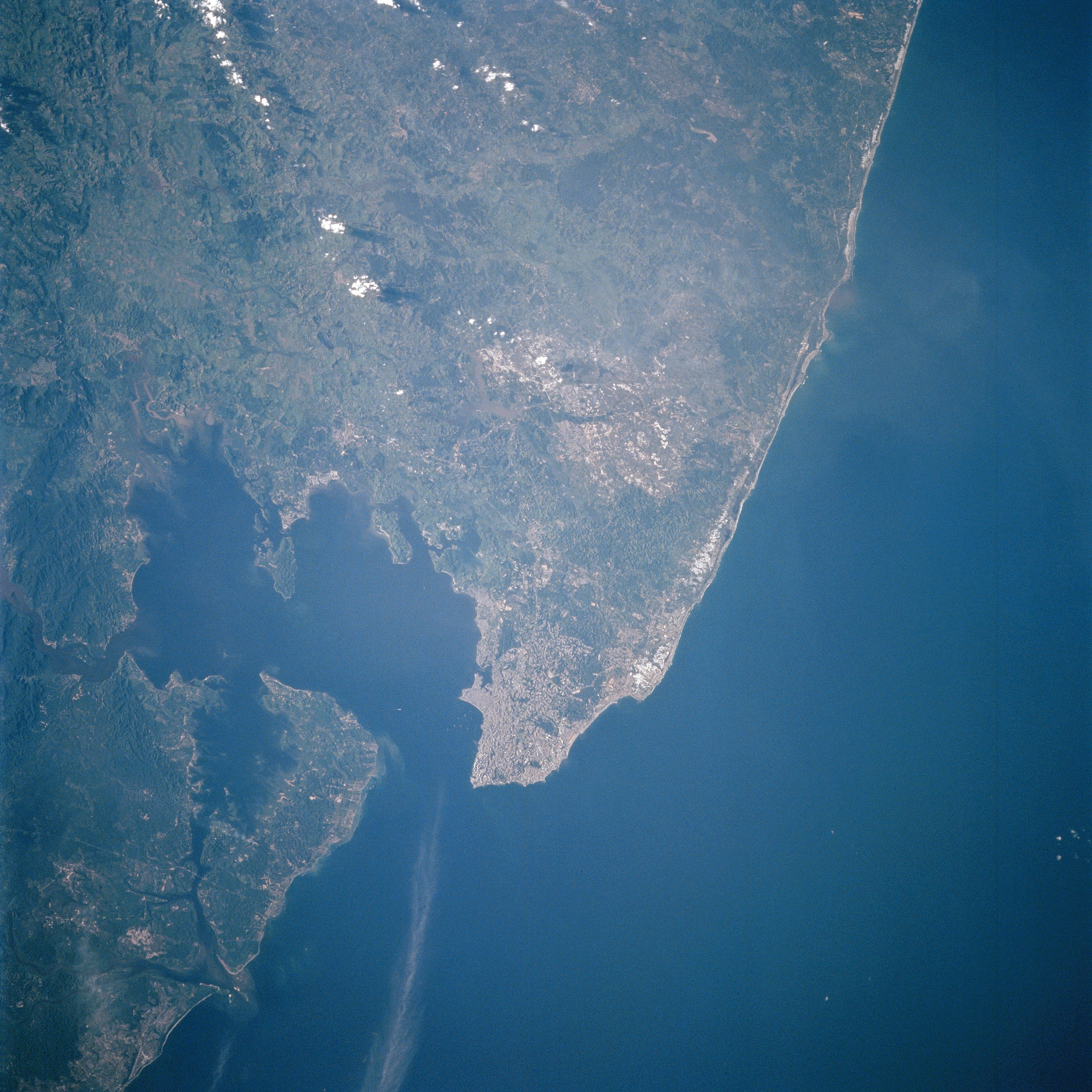
- Salvador and the Bay of All Saints in April 1997

- Location within Brazil
- Location: Bahia, Brazil
- Coordinates: 12°51′S 38°38′W
- River sources: Paraguaçu River; Subaé River; Jaguaripe River
- Ocean/sea sources: Atlantic Ocean
- Basin countries: Brazil
- Surface area: 1,223 square kilometers (472 mi^{2})
- Average depth: 9.8 meters (32 ft)
- Settlements: Salvador

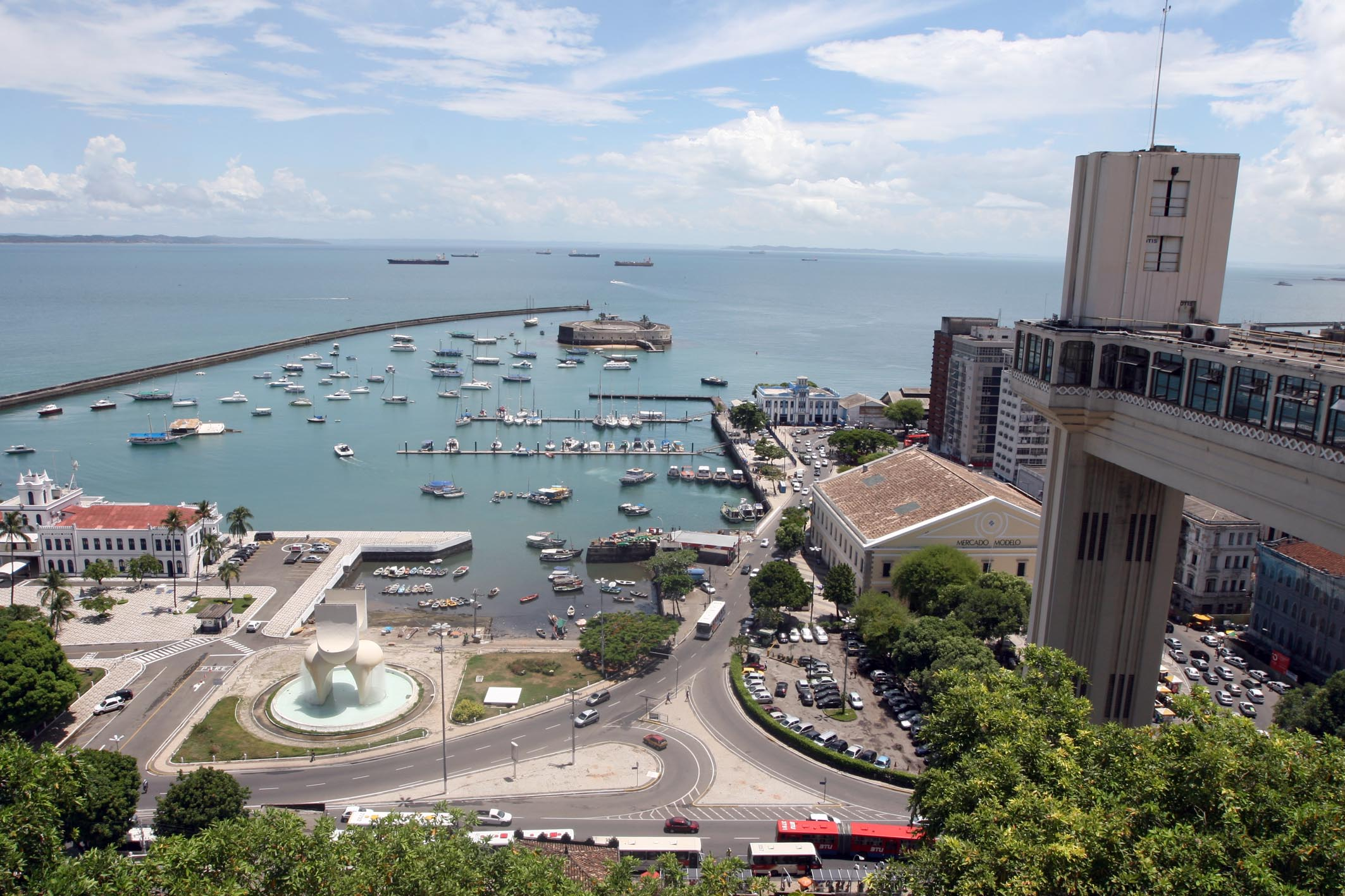
View of the Bay of All Saints (Baía de Todos os Santos) from the Rio Branco Palace, Salvador, Bahia, Brazil, 2018.

Dutch map of Bahia de Todos os Sanctos, 1627.

The Bay of All Saints (Portuguese: Baía de Todos os Santos), also known as All Saints' Bay and Todos os Santos Bay, is the principal bay of the Brazilian state of Bahia, to which it gave its name. It sits on the eastern coast of Brazil, surrounding part of Bahia's capital Salvador and opening to the Atlantic Ocean. It covers 1,223 square kilometers (472 mi^{2}), making it the largest bay in Brazil.

Farol da Barra (Barra Lighthouse), on the site of a historic fort, stands at the entrance of the bay. The Bay of All Saints is shallow along much of its area with an average depth of 9.8 meters (32 ft). The Paraguaçu River travels 500 kilometers (310 mi) to empty into the bay and the coastal lowlands of the Reconcavo Basin are at its mouth. It contains 91 islands, the largest being Itaparica Island at its entrance. Other important islands include the Ilha dos Frades, ilha de Maré, ilha de Bom Jesus, and the small Ilha do Medo.

== History ==
The Italian explorer Amerigo Vespucci was the first European to visit the bay, during his second expedition to the Americas. He entered the bay on All Saints' Day (November 1), 1501. He named the Bay of the Holy Savior of All the Saints after the date and his parish church in Florence, San Salvatore di Ognissanti. Initially, the bay, its principal settlement, and the captaincy around it all shared the same name, but they were eventually distinguished, the state becoming simply Bahia, the bay becoming the Bay of All Saints, and the city becoming first Bahia and now (usually) Salvador.

In 1501, one year after the arrival of Pedro Álvares Cabral's fleet in Porto Seguro, Gaspar de Lemos arrived at the Bay of All Saints and sailed most of the Bahia coast. The first European to disembark in Morro de São Paulo was Martim Afonso de Sousa in 1531, while he was leading an expedition charged with exploring the coast of the new continent.

Salvador was a major slave port for the sugarcane fields of Brazil by the early 18th century. In the whaling days, it was also a popular spot, since the bay was a mating ground for whales.

The northeast shore of the Bay of All Saints is home to Brazil's first active oil fields. The municipality of São Francisco do Conde, at the north of the bay, remains a port that serves the oil refineries at Mataripe. The bay is dredged from the port to the Atlantic Ocean to remain open to shipping.
