= Aratuípe =

Municipality of Bahia, Brazil

Coordinates: 13°05′S 39°00′W

- Municipality
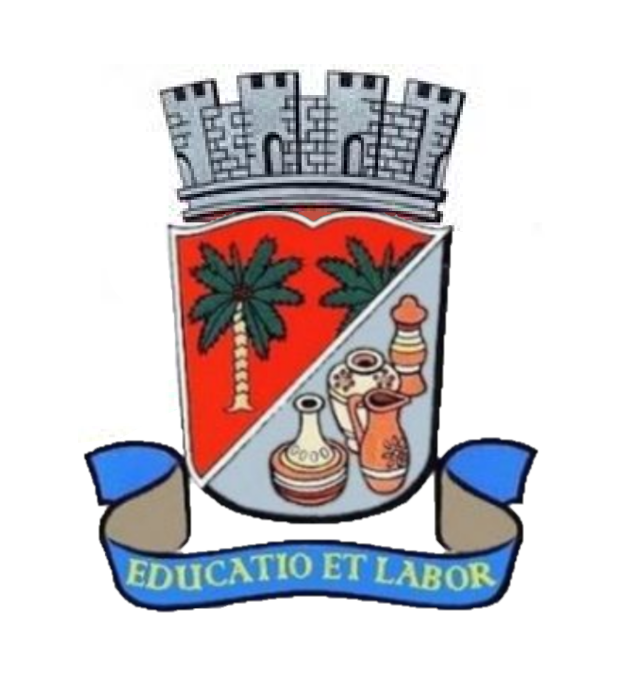
- Coat of arms
- Interactive map of Aratuípe
- Country: Brazil
- Region: Nordeste
- State: Bahia

Population (2020)
  - Total: 8,837
- Time zone: UTC−3 (BRT)

Aratuípe is a municipality in the state of Bahia in the North-East region of Brazil.

== See also ==
- List of municipalities in Bahia
