= Paratinga =

Municipality of Bahia, Brazil

Paratinga Município de Paratinga
- Municipality
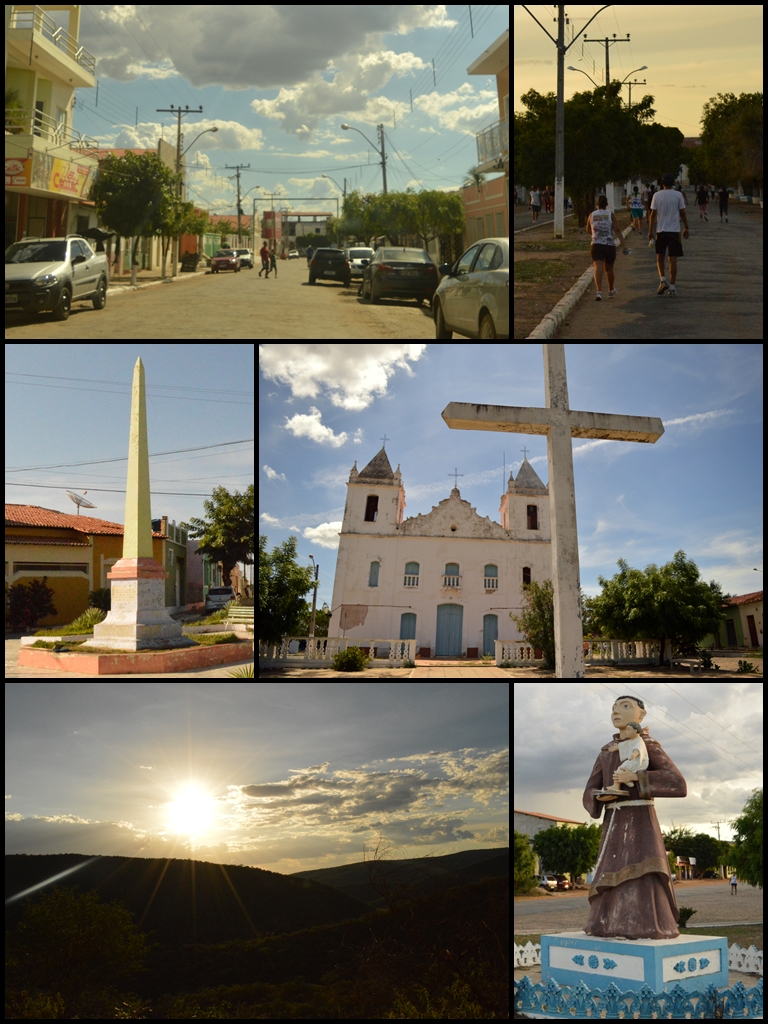
- Top left: Manoel Novais Avenue; top right: sunset on the access road to the pier; center left: obelisk in Rui Barbosa Square; center right: Santo Antônio Parish Church; bottom left: hills in Boqueirão de Regino; bottom right: sculpture of Saint Anthony of Padua.

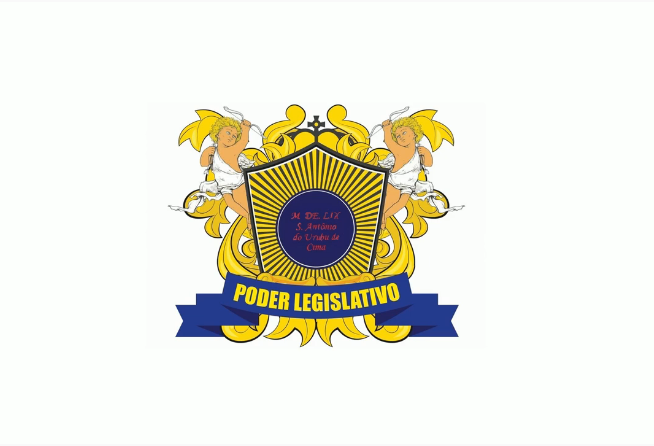
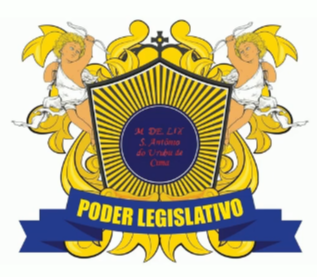
- Flag Coat of arms
- Nicknames: "Land of Saint Anthony" "City of Music"
- Location of Paratinga in Bahia

- Location of Paratinga in Brazil
- Coordinates: 12°41′27″S 43°11′02″W
- Country: Brazil
- Region: Northeast
- State: Bahia
- Intermediate Region (IBGE/2017): Guanambi
- Immediate Region (IBGE/2017): Bom Jesus da Lapa
- Adjacent municipalities: Bom Jesus da Lapa, Ibotirama, Macaúbas, Sítio do Mato, Muquém de São Francisco, Boquira, Oliveira dos Brejinhos
- Distance to capital: 710 km
- Founded: 11 April 1718
- Emancipated: 25 June 1897

Government
  - Mayor: Vitor Ferreira de Santana (PT)
  - Term ends: 2028

Area
  - Total: 2,624.118 km^{2} (1,013.178 sq mi)
- Elevation: 420 m (1,380 ft)

Population (IBGE/2022)
  - Total: 29,252
  - Rank: BA: 89th
  - Density: 11.147/km^{2} (28.872/sq mi)
- Demonym: Paratinguense
- Time zone: UTC−3 (BRT)
- Postal code (CEP): 47500-000
- Districts: Paratinga (seat) and Águas do Paulista
- Climate: Hot semi-arid
- Climate classification: BSh
- HDI (UNDP/2010): 0.59
- GDP (IBGE/2016): R$200,638,000
- GDP per capita (IBGE/2016): R$6,115.72
- Website: www.paratinga.ba.gov.br

Paratinga is a Brazilian municipality located in the interior of the state of Bahia, in the Northeast Region of the country. It is situated 710 kilometers west of the state capital, Salvador, and 749 kilometers east of the federal capital, Brasília. The municipality covers an area of approximately 2,624.118 km^{2} (1,013.178 sq mi) and had a population of 29,504 inhabitants according to the 2010 census by the Brazilian Institute of Geography and Statistics (IBGE), making it the 89th most populous municipality in the state and the third in its microregion.

As part of the effort to settle Brazil's interior, Paratinga is one of the oldest cities in Bahia. It developed from the 17th century on farms and lands owned by the landowner Antônio Guedes de Brito. The municipality became an important regional hub due to its strategic port, through which populations traveled along the São Francisco River. It was the center of economic and political power for the Guedes de Brito family, and in the 18th century, its territory was the largest in the state, extending to the border with Minas Gerais. Over time, its territory was reduced with the emancipation of several municipalities, including Bom Jesus da Lapa, Ibotirama, and Macaúbas.

Today, Paratinga is home to significant historical heritage. Many of its old buildings feature influences of Neo-Baroque and Art Deco architectural styles. Beyond its cultural framework, the municipality is notable for tourism, particularly due to the thermal springs in the district of Águas do Paulista and one of its villages, Brejo das Moças. However, the city, like the entire São Francisco River region, faces environmental and economic challenges, influenced by neglect from national public administration since the Portuguese colonization, and during the periods of the Empire and the Republic.

The municipal seat has an average annual temperature of 27.9 degrees Celsius. Located in the Caatinga biome, with a semi-arid climate, Paratinga is bathed by the São Francisco River and has several watercourses within its territory. Its Human Development Index (HDI), according to 2010 data, is 0.590, considered low by the United Nations (UN). Situated at an average distance from major Brazilian capitals such as Salvador, Brasília, Goiânia, and Belo Horizonte, the municipality is served by the state highway BA-160, which connects it to various Bahian cities up to the border with Minas Gerais. Although it faces unfavorable indicators in areas such as education, socioeconomic and infrastructure indicators have shown improvements in recent years.

== Etymology ==
The name Paratinga, chosen to designate the city, is an adaptation from the Tupi language of the municipality's former name, Rio Branco, through State Decree No. A total of 141 of 31 December 1943. The name combines the Tupi words pará ("river") and tinga ("white").

== History ==
=== Early peoples and colonization ===
The region on the left and right banks of the São Francisco River, in western Bahia, where Paratinga is located, was inhabited by various indigenous populations, including the Tamoios, Cataguás, Xacriabás, Aricobés, Tabajaras, Amoipira, Tupiná, Ocren, Sacragrinha, and Tupinambás. In Paratinga specifically, it is believed that the Tuxás were the predominant indigenous group.

The first records of Portuguese arrival in Paratinga date back to the 16th century, when Duarte Coelho Pereira, the donatary captain of Pernambuco, visited the region during an exploratory expedition between 1543 and 1550. In 1553, King John III ordered Tomé de Sousa to explore the sources of the São Francisco River. The Spaniard Francisco Bruza Espinosa, residing in Porto Seguro, led the expedition, which, according to scholars, may have reached Bom Jesus da Lapa a year and a half after its start. However, there was no permanent occupation by Luso-Brazilians. In 1602, the bandeirante Belchior Dias Moreia passed through the region.

Colonization effectively began in the 17th century when the cattle rancher and landowner Antônio Guedes de Brito received land grants covering large areas of the Interior of Bahia, including the Paratinga region, forming his latifundium, the Casa da Ponte, which was the second largest in Colonial Brazil. Guedes de Brito, known for his exploration, was also responsible for the extinction of much of the indigenous population in the Middle São Francisco, enslaving the survivors.

Later, after his death, his granddaughter Joana da Silva Caldeira Pimentel Guedes de Brito inherited several family farms. Within the Santo Antônio do Urubu de Cima Farm, the settlement of the same name, simply known as Urubu, emerged. This village was characterized by cattle ranching and agricultural activities, with residents comprising Luso-Brazilians, indigenous people, and Africans. It developed around a chapel dedicated to Saint Anthony, built in 1680, the oldest temple in the Middle São Francisco region. According to legend, the settlement's name originated from the discovery of an image of Saint Anthony under a tree, guarded by a vulture perched above, shielding it from the sun.

Due to the settlement and large cattle corrals, by the early 18th century, Paratinga became a strategic point for rest and passage of herdsmen traveling between the interior of Minas Gerais and Bahia. Additionally, some of the cattle passing through were traded in Goiás and Mato Grosso.

In the São Francisco Valley, the Guedes de Brito family owned ten cattle ranches: Boa Vista, Batalha, Volta, Campos de São João, Itibiruba (Itibiraba), Mocambo, Campo Grande, Curralinho, Riacho dos Porcos, and Santo Antônio do Urubu. The region was mapped in 1734 by Joaquim Quaresma Delgado, hired to explore and map the interior of Bahia and Minas Gerais.

At that time, most farm owners were absent from their properties, allowing slaves and other residents a degree of independence. In the owners' absence, specific individuals—free, enslaved, or manumitted, of indigenous and Afro-Brazilian origin—performed administrative tasks, granting them a certain hierarchical authority over others.

Land leasing was a significant system during the Casa da Ponte era, involving people from various regions and economic backgrounds, including pilgrims passing through Bom Jesus da Lapa. Through this activity, many Portuguese and Paulistas settled with families in Santo Antônio do Urubu de Cima by purchasing and leasing lands from the Guedes de Brito family. Communication and interaction among the traveling populations of Santo Antônio do Urubu de Cima, Bom Jardim, and the Sanctuary of Bom Jesus da Lapa were crucial for the region's development and settlement through terrestrial routes.

=== Colonial and pre-imperial period ===
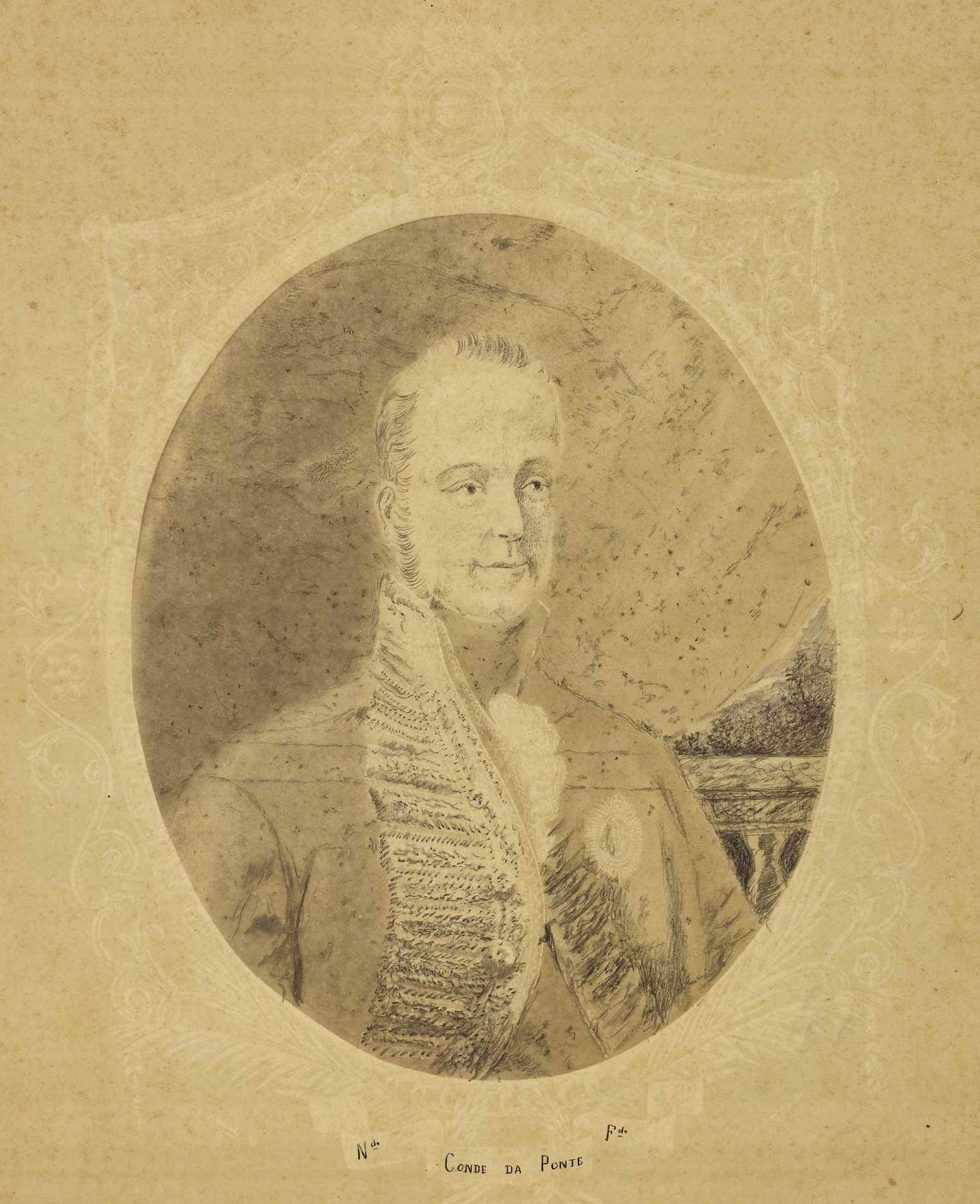
João, heir to the Guedes de Brito fortunes, governed the Bahia captaincy during the arrival of the royal family in Brazil.

In the 1710s, the then Archbishop of Bahia, Sebastião Monteiro da Vide, requested King John V to create new parishes, outlined in 1712. In this context, over twenty settlements, including Urubu, gained prominence. Due to its growth and the presence of the Santo Antônio Parish Church, Sebastião decreed on 11 April 1718 that the Santo Antônio do Urubu de Cima settlement become a parish, retaining the same name. In 1714, it had 362 households and 3,425 inhabitants.

On 23 March 1746, King John V, after consultation with the Overseas Council of the Portuguese court, ordered André de Melo e Castro, the Count of Galveias, to establish the Vila de Santo Antônio do Urubu, separated from Jacobina. However, the village was only officially established on 27 September 1749 by the ombudsman Francisco Marcolino de Souza.

After Joana's death, her inheritance and surname passed to her husband through the Guedes de Brito estate. The last heir to the family's fortunes was João de Saldanha da Gama Melo Torres Guedes Brito, governor of the Captaincy of Bahia between 1805 and 1809, responsible for receiving the Portuguese royal family in Brazil, fleeing the Napoleonic wars in 1808. He died during his term, and in 1819, the sesmaria territories were registered and divided into six administrative districts named after the municipalities managing them. Besides Urubu, Rio de Contas, Rio Pardo, Caetité, Xique-Xique, and Jacobina were included. According to the literary journal O Patriota, in 1813, Urubu spanned 18 leagues.

During the period leading up to Brazilian independence, the Bahia province experienced political unrest. Rio de Contas, one of the main villages in the region, sought support from Caetité and Urubu to form a new province, encompassing Bahian and Minas Gerais territories, with Rio de Contas as the capital. The autonomy proposal, made in different years, caused tension between Rio de Contas and Caetité and, despite some regional impact, was not approved by the Crown.

During the same period, in mid-1822 and 1823, Urubu residents produced a petition requesting a new ombudsman for the village, distrusting the incumbent. Francisco Pires de Almeida Freitas held the position at the time, and the population's distrust stemmed from his request to the Empire's minister to relocate the Justice and Registry Office from Urubu to the Macaúbas settlement, citing an alleged epidemic of river fevers in the village. Another account suggests correspondence to the Internal Council claimed the move was necessary due to "attacks of despotism against citizens," the recruitment of slaves by Portuguese, and opposition to the independence process to ensure Urubu's "obedience," countering the tension created by Rio de Contas.

On 10 April 1823, the village's representatives, through seven documents, opposed the ombudsman's decision. Their efforts were in vain: the ordinance of 17 December 1823 mandated the transfer of the Justice and Registry Office to Macaúbas. The decision was reversed only in 1834, after numerous local protests and Macaúbas' emancipation from Urubu in 1832, becoming an independent village.

=== Imperial period ===
During this period, Urubu underwent several changes and held prominence in the São Francisco region, mainly for centralizing local public power and serving as a commercial and cultural reference. In terms of territorial extent, it was the largest municipality in Bahia. In 1827, the village bordered Pilão Arcado to the north, Minas Gerais to the south, Barra do Rio Grande and Campo Largo to the west, and Santo Antônio da Jacobina, Rio de Contas, and Vila Nova do Príncipe e Santana de Caetité to the east. In this context, in 1830, Urubu received its first public school; on 2 May 1835, the Comarca of Urubu was established to extend imperial government authority to the region.

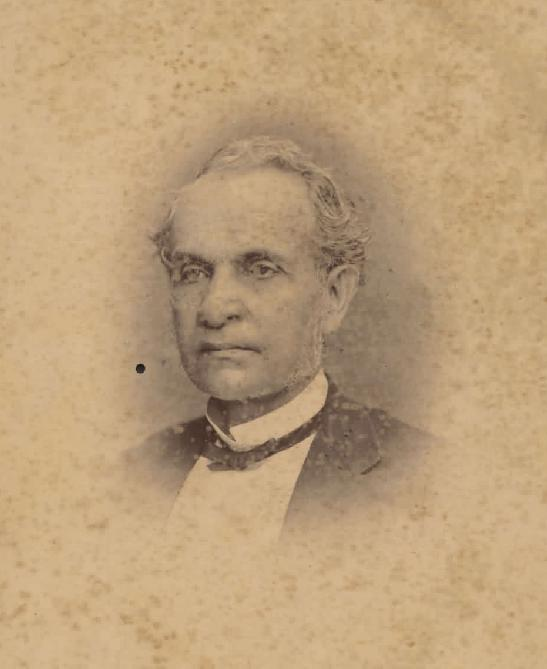
The Baron of Cotegipe, in 1850, proposed the creation of the São Francisco State, with Urubu as its capital.

The Comarca of Urubu included the terms of Urubu, Brejinhos, and Macaúbas and faced growing regional challenges. From the following decade, cases of banditry, such as cangaço, posed challenges for the comarca and nearby municipalities such as Carinhanha and Minas Gerais cities such as Januária. The perpetrators were diverse, including wealthy and poor men, slaves, priests, and even judges, driven by a desire to subvert the established order, leading to disputes over political power. Victims were typically poor free individuals, merchants, and public authorities. In the Bom Jesus settlement, part of the territory, disputes arose over control of the Bom Jesus da Lapa Brotherhood.

The tense political climate in Urubu and western Bahia led to conflicts. A notable case occurred on 24 January 1849, when Antônio José Guimarães, a notorious local cangaceiro and relative of public officials, left the area in ruins during a three-month action with a group of one hundred armed men, declaring himself governor of the region. His actions extended across several Bahian villages until he was killed in 1854 while fleeing in the province of Goiás. Simultaneously, there was strong rivalry between the Conservative and Liberal parties, which led to armed conflicts between colonel José Rodrigues de Magalhães, leader of the liberals, and the "palhas," led by the conservative vicar José Domingues dos Santos, damaging the Igreja do Rosário.

Additionally, in the 1850s, Bahia suffered a cholera epidemic. In Urubu, around 1854, a type of "fever epidemic" was reported, described by doctors as a benign bilious fever. Between 1857 and 1861, the region, like the entire province, faced a severe and concerning drought period, further weakening the slave trade and the fortunes of large landowners. Slavery continued until the Lei Áurea was enacted, and before that, many were freed, while others were sold to owners in places such as Minas Gerais.

In the final decades of the century, Urubu remained prominent for cattle trading and river transport. On 19 July 1850, the Baron of Cotegipe, João Maurício Wanderley, was the first to propose dividing the province of Bahia, creating the São Francisco State. If established, Urubu would have been the capital, named União. The proposal was not accepted, but the project has been revisited over centuries and remains a topic of discussion in Brazil today.

=== From the Republican period to the present day ===
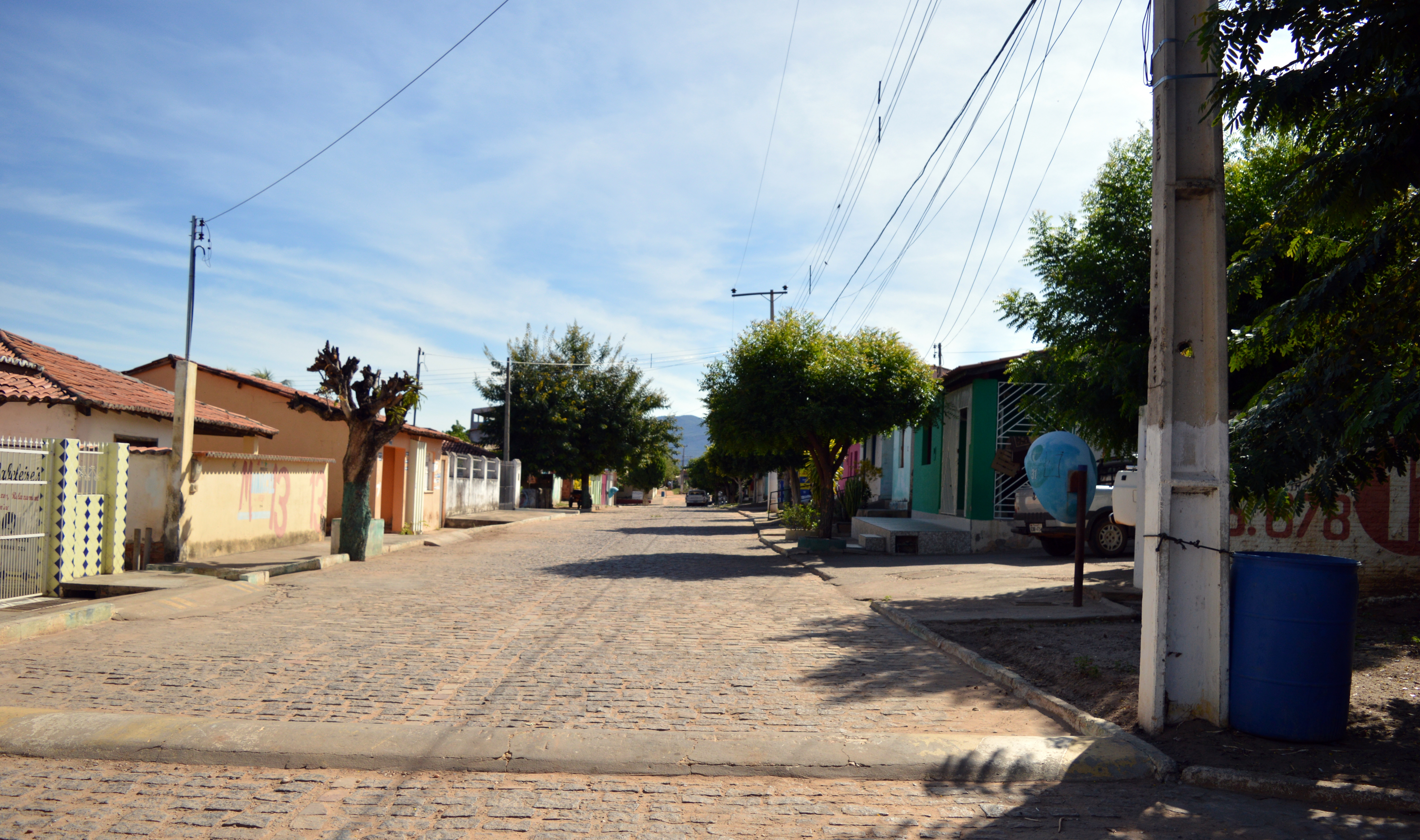
Águas do Paulista was elevated to district status in 1953.

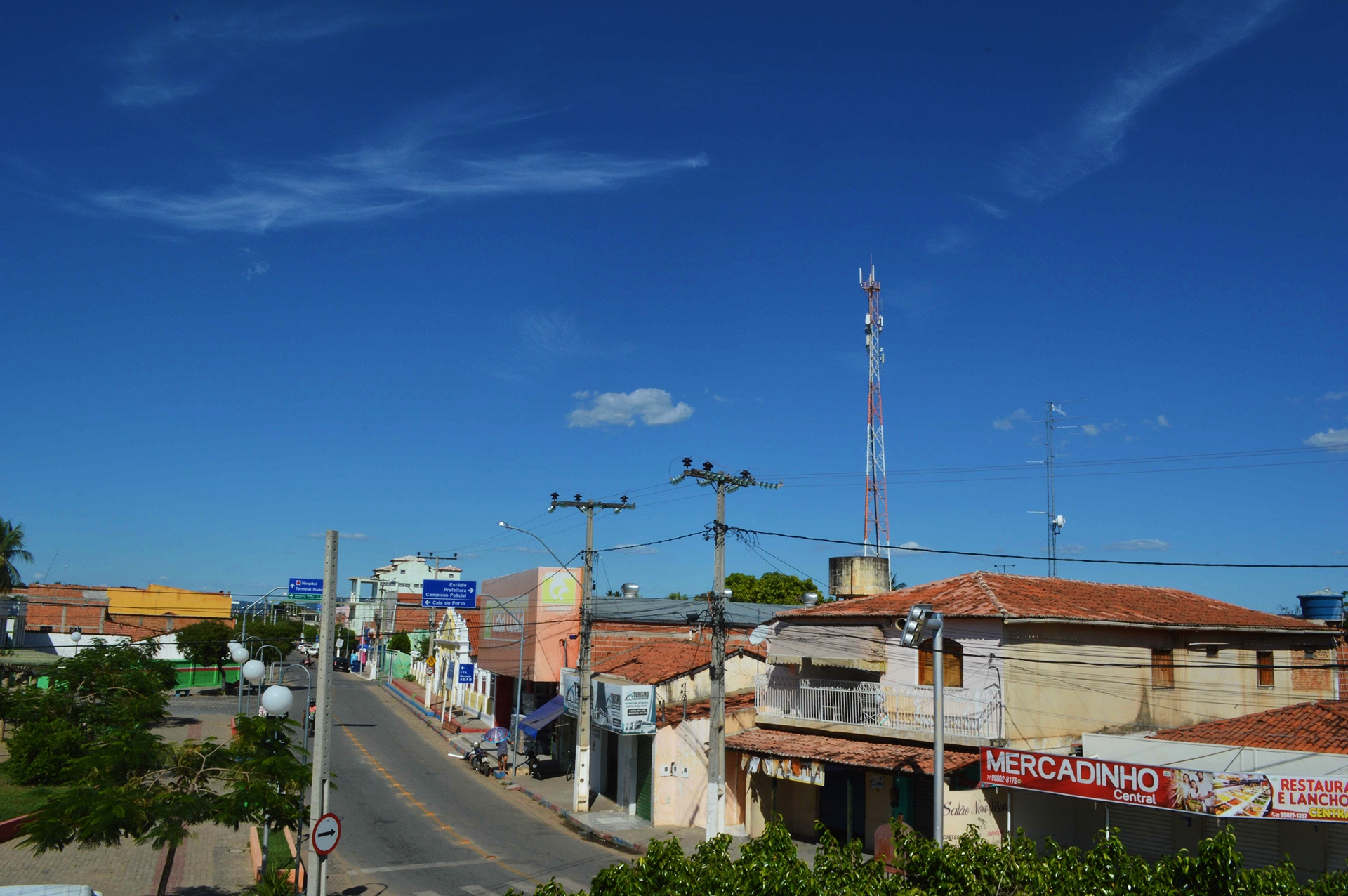
Manoel Novais Avenue, one of the city's main roads, in 2020.

The establishment of the republic in Brazil led to the elevation of the village of Santo Antônio do Urubu to city status, named Urubu, on 25 June 1897, through State Law No. 177. Other regions, previously part of the municipality, were emancipated over time. The first was Bom Jesus da Lapa in 1890. Ibotirama, formerly Bom Jardim, separated in 1958. Sítio do Mato became part of Bom Jesus da Lapa after its emancipation and only became independent in 1989. The 20th century thus involved the decentralization of the political power Urubu previously held.

On 29 May 1912, the municipality ceased to be called Urubu and was renamed Rio Branco through State Law No. 884, originally a bill by then-deputy and future Bahia governor Antônio Muniz Sodré de Aragão. On 31 December 1943, through State Decree-Law No. 141, ratified by State Decree No. 12,978 of 1 January 1944, the name Rio Branco was changed to Paratinga, which persists to this day.

The 1940s marked the beginning of public policies for the development of the São Francisco River Valley, where Paratinga is located. The construction of Brasília in the following years also facilitated the integration of the municipality, among others, into Brazil's Central-West region. Highways also began reaching western Bahia during this period. Between the 1950s and 1990s, the urban area received electricity, municipal offices, and public lighting. The rural population, until the mid-1960s, relied solely on animal transport. In 1953, the district of Águas do Paulista was established, the only district besides the municipal seat. The asphalt of the BA-160 highway, inaugurated in 1975, reached the area only in the 1990s.

In 1979, Paratinga was one of the cities affected by the flood of 1979, caused by the overflow of the Sobradinho Reservoir and Três Marias Dam. Nearly the entire urban population was displaced, and parts of the rural population also suffered flooding, requiring state assistance, including helicopters for rescues. In 1980, Paratinga's airstrip was deactivated and transformed into a new neighborhood, partly becoming Rio Branco Avenue.

Most of Paratinga's rural areas began receiving greater public investment from the 1990s. During this period, under various mayoral administrations, wells were installed in villages, roads were opened, schools were inaugurated, telecommunications networks were established, and electricity was expanded, becoming predominant only from the 2010s.

The historically noted high social inequality and poverty in Paratinga have largely persisted. This is primarily due to land concentration, dependence on public administration, and limited job opportunities, leading to emigration to urban centers. Another issue is droughts, which reduce natural resources. Paratinga is among Bahia's most populous municipalities vulnerable to drought and desertification.

== Geography ==
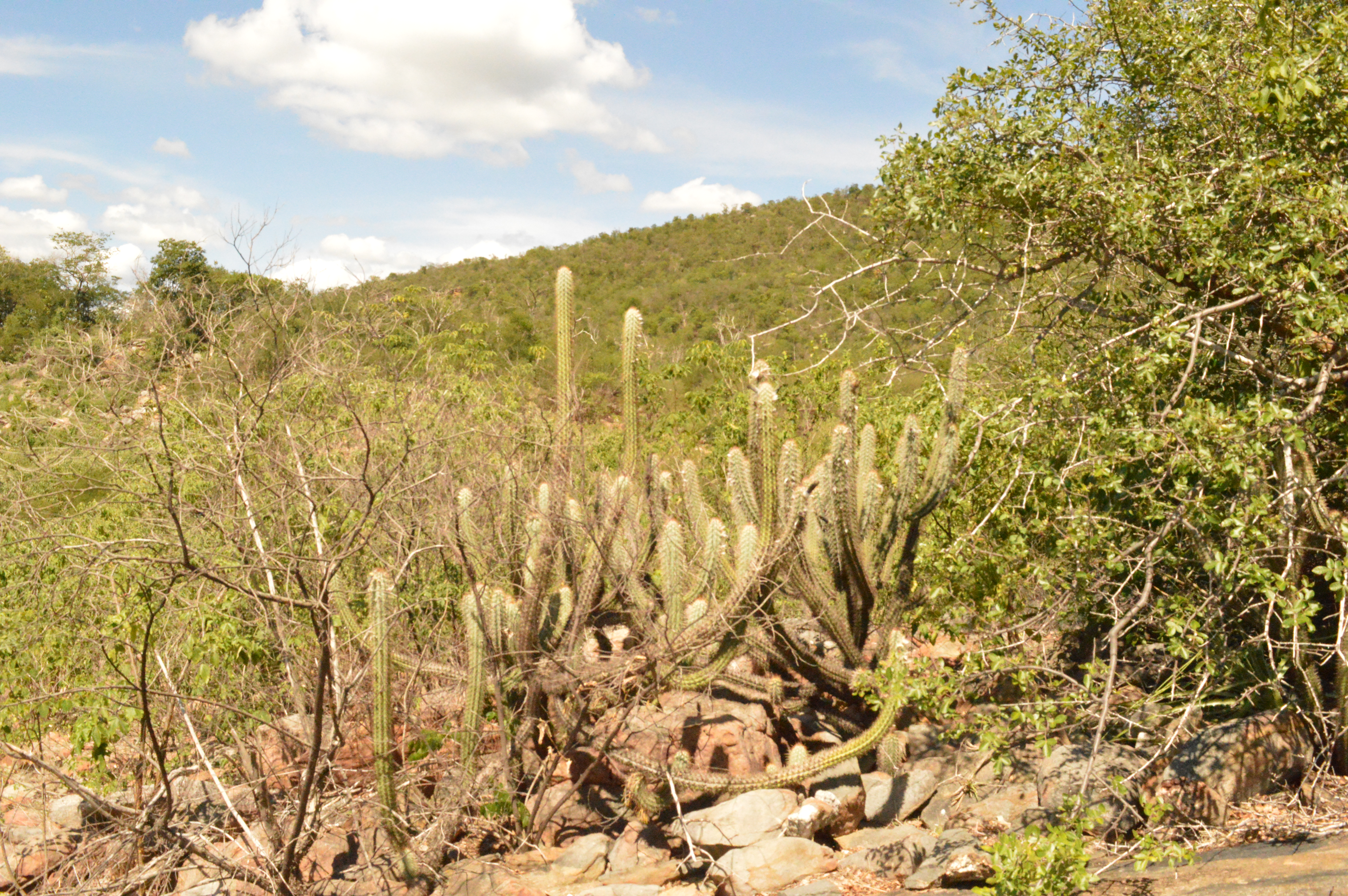
Vegetation in Paratinga's rural area, highlighting cactus species.

The municipality of Paratinga is located 710 km (440 mi) from Salvador, the state capital, and 749 km (465 mi) from Brasília, the federal capital. It covers an area of 2,624.118 km^{2} (1,013.178 sq mi), and borders Muquém de São Francisco, Ibotirama, and Oliveira dos Brejinhos to the north, Bom Jesus da Lapa and Sítio do Mato to the south, Boquira and Macaúbas to the east, and Sítio do Mato to the west. According to the current regional division in effect since 2017, established by the IBGE, the municipality belongs to the Intermediate Geographic Region of Guanambi and Immediate Geographic Region of Bom Jesus da Lapa. Previously, under the division of microregions and mesoregions, it was part of the Bom Jesus da Lapa microregion, included in the Vale São-Franciscano da Bahia mesoregion.

The municipality's terrain, with a maximum altitude of 420 meters, consists of the Espinhaço Range, particularly in much of Paratinga's rural area, as well as the Sertanejo Pediplain, typical of Bahia's semi-arid region, and the Sertaneja-São Francisco Depression. The rocks in the municipality are part of the Guanambi-Urandi monzo-syenitic batholith, formed during the Lower Proterozoic and Archean periods, characterized as a mobile belt. Geomorphologically, alluvial, colluvial, and fluvial deposits predominate.

The predominant soil type is dystrophic red-yellow latosol, with a secondary portion of eutrophic alluvial soil concentrated in islands and riverbanks. Paratinga is part of the Drought Polygon, characterized by low rainfall but high fertility. Eutrophic red-yellow podzol and regosol are also present. The vegetation cover in Paratinga consists of Caatinga, typical of the Sertão, with a predominance of cacti. Common species include imbu, umburana, ouricury palm, caper shrubs, croton, rosemary, red sorrel, ceiba, macambira, and caroa.

=== Hydrography ===
Paratinga is bathed by the São Francisco River, located on the municipality's left bank and situated in the homonymous hydrographic basin. The municipality is also crossed by the Santo Onofre River, a tributary of the São Francisco, and the Riacho do Paulista, in the Águas do Paulista district. According to the Encyclopedia of Brazilian Municipalities published in 1958, the Santa Rita Stream, also a periodic tributary of the São Francisco, was notable, as were lagoons such as Largo, Grande, Jacaré, Ipueira, Tapera, and Marinheiro, formed by river overflows during higher water levels.

The city also features several islands used for agriculture. The main one, on the western bank of the urban area, the Paratinga Island, is the largest fluvial island in the São Francisco River, measuring 12,000 m (39,000 ft) in length and 300 m (980 ft) in width. Additionally, Paratinga includes Mangal Island (4,000 m (13,000 ft) long and 300 m (980 ft) wide), Cavalos Island (5,000 m (16,000 ft) long and 1,000 m (3,300 ft) wide), and Barroso Island (5,000 m (16,000 ft) long and 1,250 m (4,100 ft) wide). In the Águas do Paulista district and the Brejo das Moças village, Paratinga has hot springs.

Water supply in Paratinga is managed by the Autonomous Water and Sewage Service (SAAE), a municipal agency, which sources water directly from the São Francisco River. In rural areas, the Bahia Environmental Engineering and Water Resources Company (Cerb) has been providing water services to part of the population since 2012. In 2015, the São Francisco and Parnaíba Valley Development Company (CODEVASF) announced the construction of a water supply system for additional rural communities in the city. The São Francisco River Fluvial Authority covers the region, managed by the Bom Jesus da Lapa Fluvial Agency.

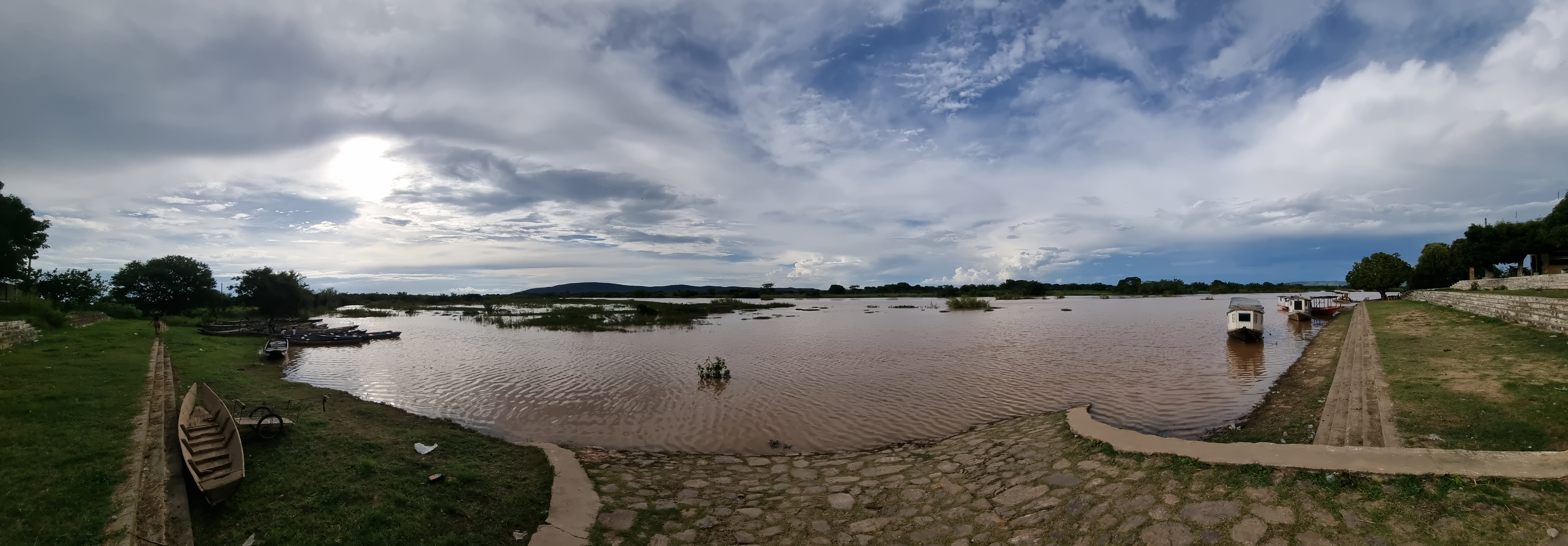
Panorama of the São Francisco River at the Paratinga Port Wharf, January 2023.

=== Climate ===
The climate of Paratinga is classified by the IBGE as hot semi-arid (type BSh according to the Köppen classification), with an average annual temperature of 25.9 °C (78.6 °F) and average annual rainfall of 768 millimetres (30.2 in), concentrated between November and March, with December being the wettest month (148 mm). The hottest month, October, has an average temperature of 27.9 °C (82.2 °F), with an average high of 34.8 °C (94.6 °F) and an average low of 21.0 °C (69.8 °F). The coolest month, June, averages 24.3 °C (75.7 °F), with a high of 32.1 °C (89.8 °F) and a low of 16.5 °C (61.7 °F). Autumn and spring serve as transitional seasons.

Climate data for Paratinga
Month	Jan	Feb	Mar	Apr	May	Jun	Jul	Aug	Sep	Oct	Nov	Dec	Year
Mean daily maximum °C (°F)	32.2 (90.0)	31.8 (89.2)	31.8 (89.2)	32.3 (90.1)	32.3 (90.1)	32.1 (89.8)	32.2 (90.0)	33.4 (92.1)	34.6 (94.3)	34.8 (94.6)	32.8 (91.0)	31.8 (89.2)	34.8 (94.6)
Daily mean °C (°F)	26.1 (79.0)	25.7 (78.3)	25.9 (78.6)	25.2 (77.4)	24.3 (75.7)	24.3 (75.7)	24.4 (75.9)	25.7 (78.3)	27.2 (81.0)	27.9 (82.2)	25.8 (78.4)	25.8 (78.4)	25.9 (78.6)
Mean daily minimum °C (°F)	20.0 (68.0)	19.7 (67.5)	20.0 (68.0)	19.4 (66.9)	18.1 (64.6)	16.5 (61.7)	16.6 (61.9)	18.0 (64.4)	19.8 (67.6)	21.0 (69.8)	21.0 (69.8)	19.9 (67.8)	16.5 (61.7)
Average precipitation mm (inches)	110 (4.3)	132 (5.2)	102 (4.0)	51 (2.0)	11 (0.4)	3 (0.1)	2 (0.1)	1 (0.0)	10 (0.4)	53 (2.1)	145 (5.7)	148 (5.8)	768 (30.2)
Source: Climate Data.

=== Ecology and environment ===
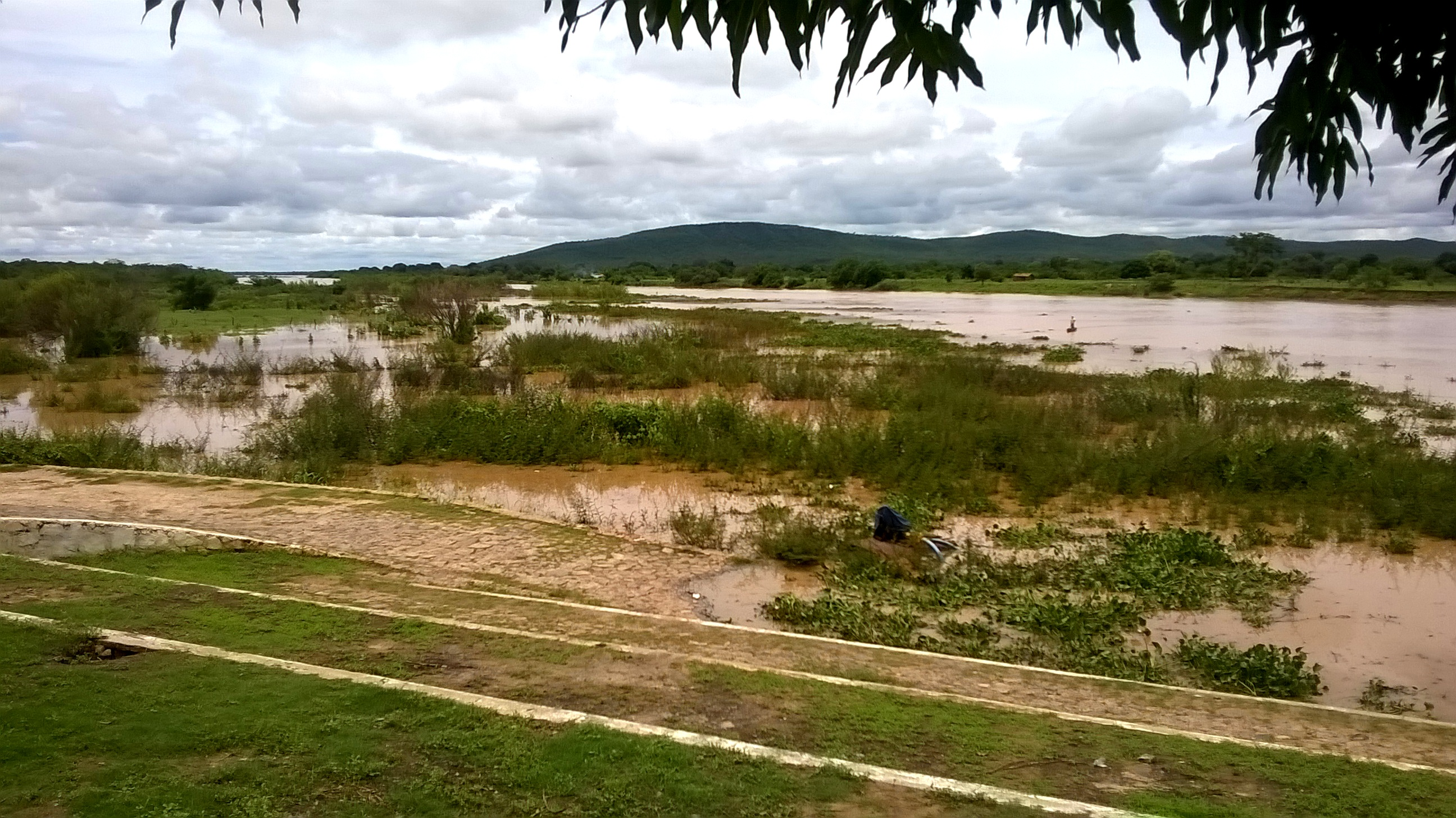
São Francisco River (at Paratinga Island) during a flood in January 2016.

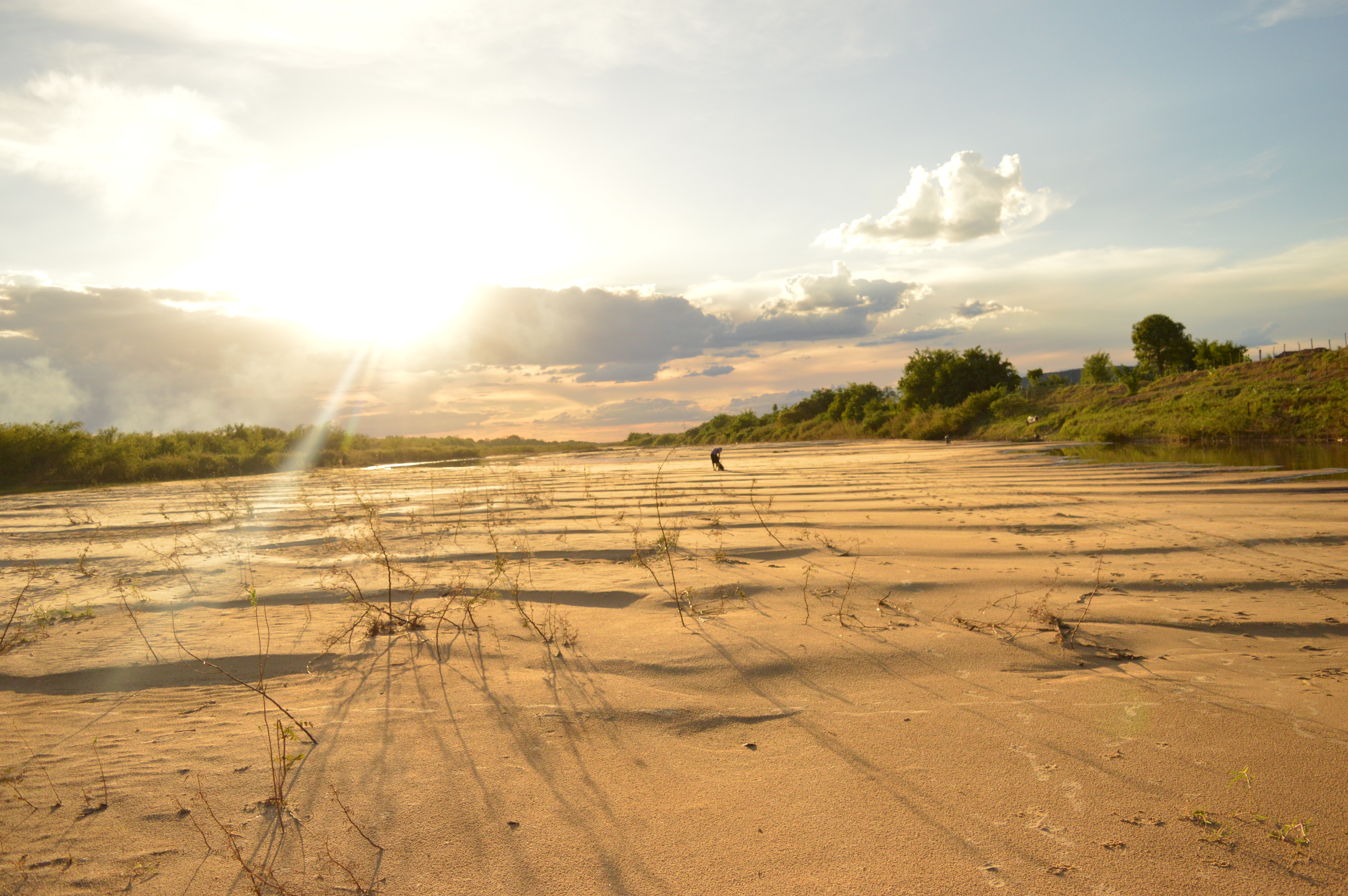
Paratinga Island in a dry state, January 2017.

Paratinga has been part of the Drought Polygon since its designation by decree-law in 1936. Between 2009 and 2010, deforestation in the region affected 0.05% of the municipality's territory. Droughts have affected the municipality for centuries, influenced by regional climatic variations and uneven rainfall distribution, which sometimes occurs in large amounts over short periods. In 1993 and 1995, for instance, severe droughts in western Bahia prompted then-mayor Eduardo do Vale Barbosa, along with 40 other mayors from western Bahia, to discuss solutions for the drought in the region. During this period, several rural villages in the city received artesian wells, actions that continued in subsequent administrations, either with local resources or in partnership with CODEVASF.

Despite frequent droughts throughout the municipality's history, there has been an increase in their frequency in recent years. In 2012, the state of Bahia declared a state of emergency in 158 municipalities, including Paratinga. In 2014, the municipal government declared that the city was experiencing a "significant abnormal drought period". The following month, the state government included the city among 109 others in critical condition, considered the worst drought in a century. In 2015, the Sobradinho Dam experienced its worst drought in forty years. Conversely, in November 2015 and January 2016, Paratinga received above-average rainfall, leading to flooding of homes, streets, and roads, with some residents reporting sanitation issues that mixed with the rainfall, posing risks of infectious diseases.

The environmental impacts on the São Francisco River are the main environmental concern in the city. As a municipality reliant on the river for its water supply and whose main sources of income are agriculture and animal husbandry, droughts consistently cause significant losses for Paratinga's residents. The most affected are riverside communities, which often depend solely on artisanal fishing for their livelihood. The result is an increasingly silted river, with erosion processes hindering navigability in its channels. In response, in 2014, the state government provided financial assistance to the population and supported the construction of cisterns and dams.

== Demography ==
Historical population
Year	Pop.	±%
1872	18,774	—
1900	14,188	−24.4%
1920	18,818	+32.6%
1940	16,105	−14.4%
1950	21,050	+30.7%
1960	16,716	−20.6%
1970	18,409	+10.1%
1980	20,635	+12.1%
1991	24,181	+17.2%
2000	27,679	+14.5%
2010	29,504	+6.6%
2022	29,252	−0.9%
Source: Demographic Censuses of IBGE (1872–2022).

According to the 2010 Brazilian Census, Paratinga had a population of 29,504 inhabitants, making it the 92nd most populous municipality in Bahia, with a population density of 11.28 inhabitants per square kilometre (29.2/sq mi). Of this total, 10,905 lived in the urban area (37%) and 18,599 in the rural area (63%). Additionally, 14,930 were male (50.60%) and 14,574 were female (49.40%), resulting in a sex ratio of 102.4. Regarding age groups, 3,217 inhabitants were under 15 years old (18.5%), 17,580 were between 15 and 59 years old (59.6%), and 3,320 were 65 years or older (21.9%).

The Human Development Index (HDI-M) of the municipality is considered low, according to data from the United Nations Development Programme. Based on the 2010 report, published in 2013, its value was 0.59, ranking it the 199th in Bahia and the 4,395 in Brazil. Although low, this represents a 135.06% increase compared to 1991. Considering only the longevity index, its value is 0.774, the income index is 0.519, and the education index is 0.510. From 2000 to 2010, the Gini index decreased from 0.66 to 0.55, and the proportion of people with a per capita household income of up to R$140 dropped from 78.43% to 51.60%, a reduction of 26.83%. In 2010, 18.1% of the population lived above the poverty line, 51.60% between the indigence and poverty lines, and 30.09% below the indigence line. In 2010, 53.3% of the population was economically active and employed.

=== Ethnicities and immigration ===
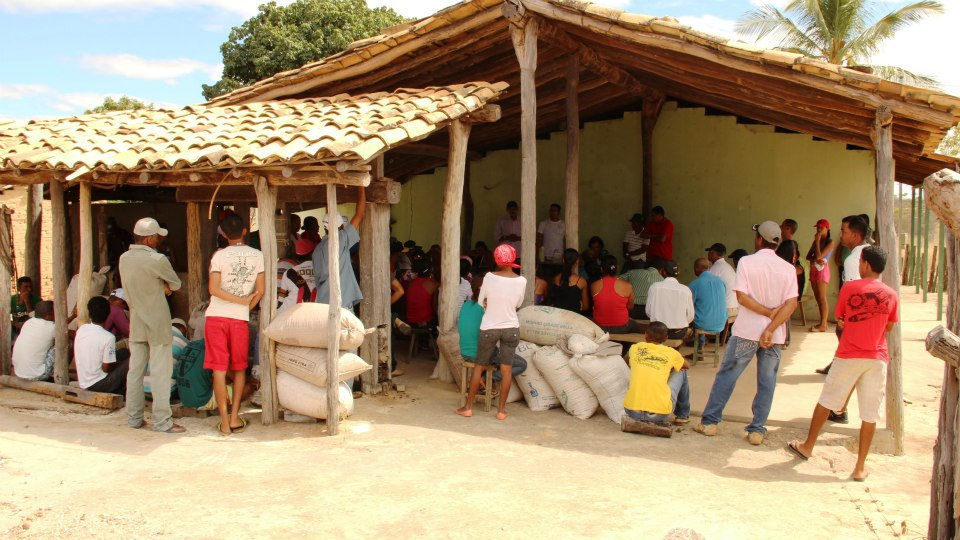
Paratinga's population is characterized by racial mixing and a predominance of mixed-race individuals. The image shows people gathered in a home in the rural area of the municipality in 2014.

Paratinga was primarily formed in the 17th century by Portuguese, Africans, and indigenous peoples. Most of the native inhabitants from western Bahia were killed, but the remaining portion was enslaved alongside African descendants. The majority of Africans came from West African countries such as Angola (particularly the Ganguela ethnic group), Cape Verde, and Guinea, as well as Mozambique. Encouraged by colonial authorities, interbreeding over the years increased the number of mestiços and Afro-descendants without specific identification in municipal records. A significant portion of enslaved Africans were also sold from Minas Gerais. According to the 1872 Brazilian Census, Paratinga had 944 individuals still subjected to slavery.

According to the 2010 Census, the population was composed of 18,559 Pardos (68.95%), 4,326 Whites (16.07%), 3,518 Blacks (13.07%), 479 Asians (1.77%), and 33 Indigenous People (0.12%). Paratinga also has three recognized quilombos: the Tomba neighborhood in the urban area, and the rural communities of Barro and Lagoa do Jacaré, predominantly composed of black individuals. In 2015, a Romani community of thirty families was recognized by the Federal Public Prosecutor's Office (MPF) in the municipality.

Considering the nationality of the resident population during the 2010 census, all inhabitants were native-born Brazilians. Regarding their region of birth, 28,493 were born in the Northeast Region (96.57%), 695 in the Southeast (2.35%), 131 in the Central-West (0.44%), 32 in the North (0.10%), and 31 in the South (0.10%), with 123 unspecified (0.41%). 28,331 inhabitants were born in Bahia (96.02%). Of those born in other states, 569 were from São Paulo (1.93%), 103 were from Minas Gerais (0.35%), 84 were from Pernambuco (0.28%), 73 were from the Federal District (0.17%), 41 were from Goiás (0.14%), 32 were from Alagoas (0.11%), 28 were from Piauí (0.%), 23 from Rio de Janeiro (0.08%), 21 from Paraná (0.07%), 21 from Rondônia (0.07%), 17 from Mato Grosso do Sul (0.06%), 11 from Rio Grande do Norte (0.04%), and nine from Rio Grande do Sul (0.03%). For 2020, the estimated population was 32,141 inhabitants.

=== Religion ===
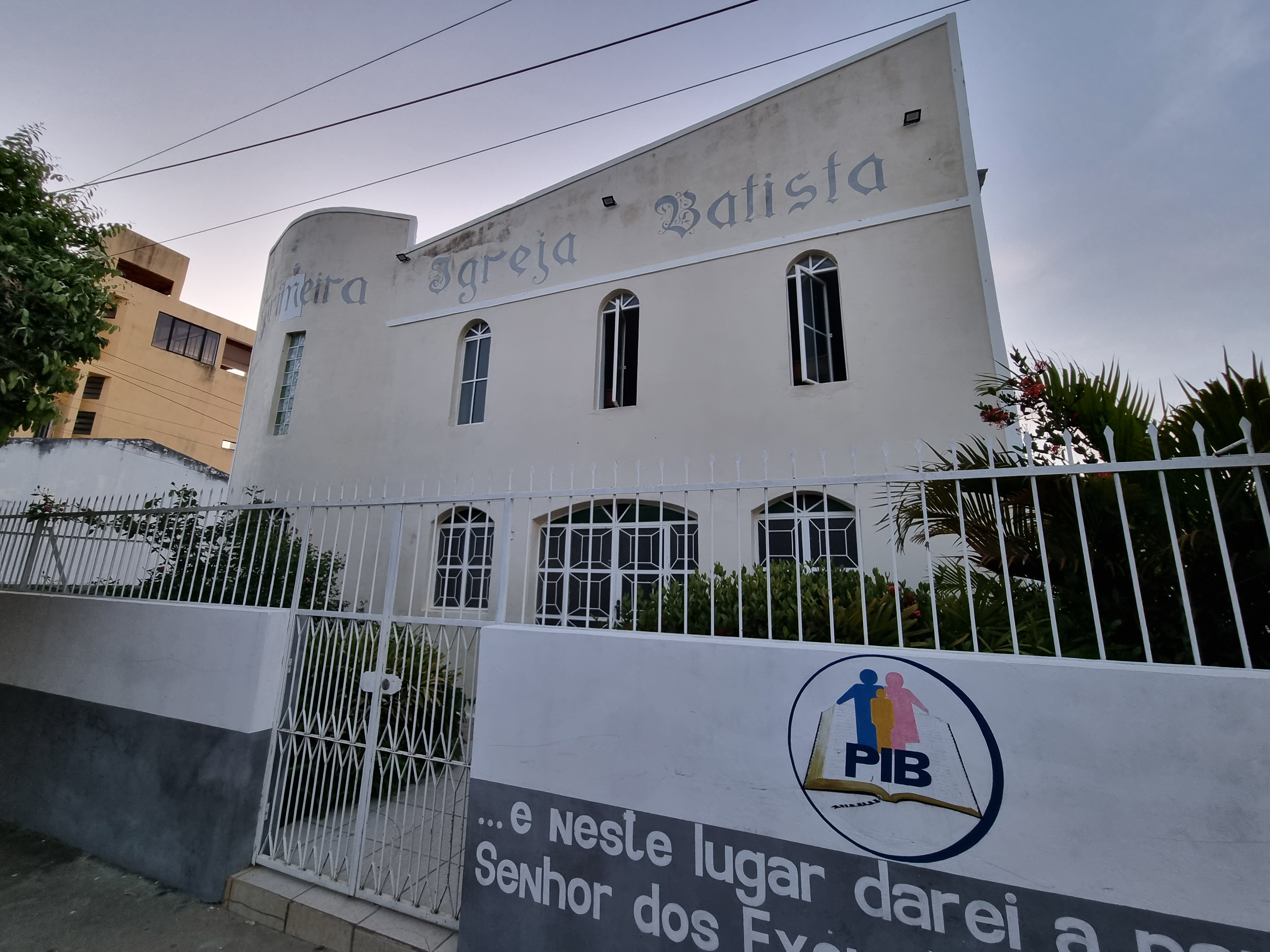
First Baptist Church of Paratinga.

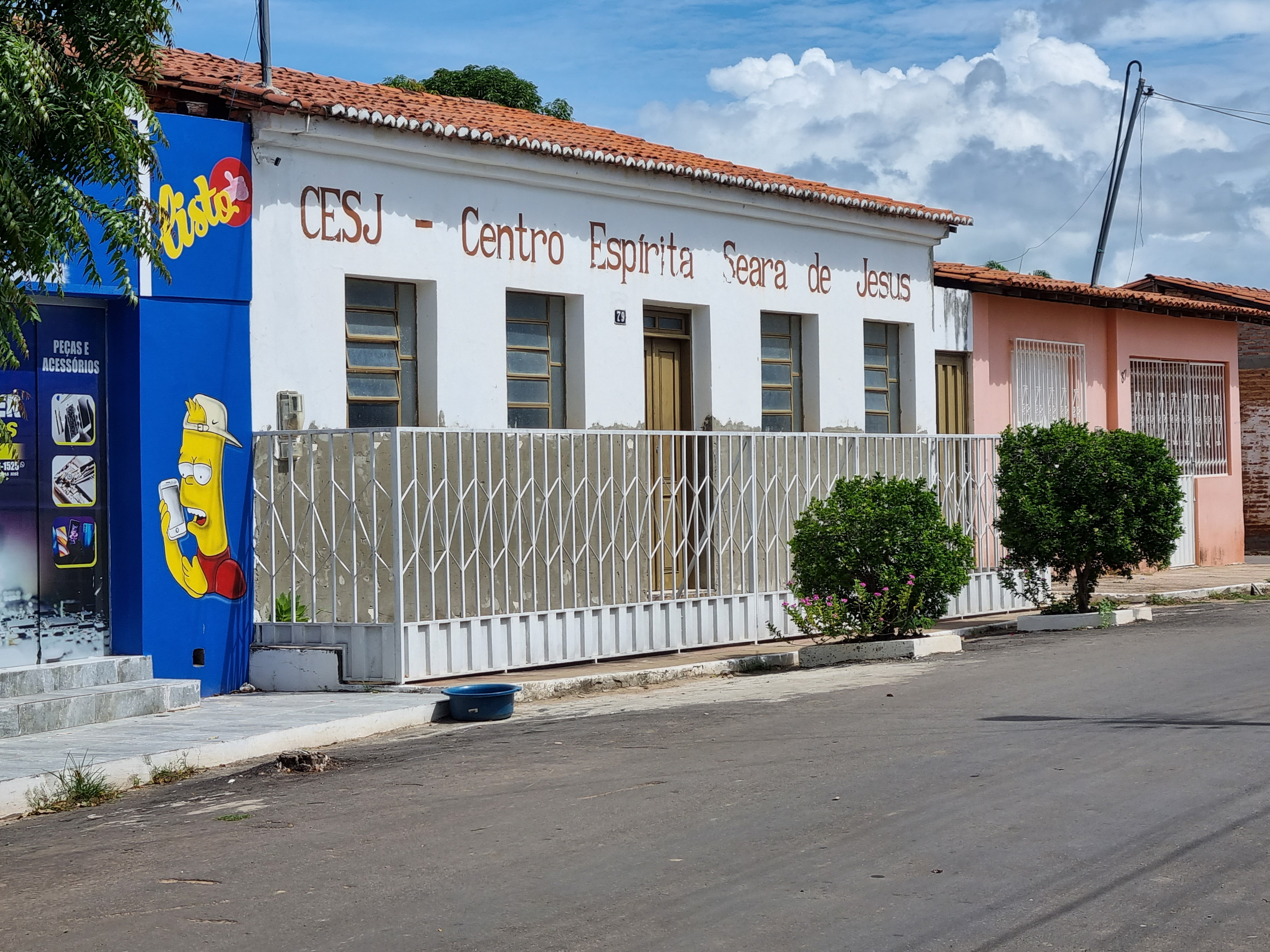
Seara de Jesus Spiritist Center.

According to the official division of the Catholic Church, Paratinga is part of the Diocese of Bom Jesus da Lapa. The establishment of religious institutions in the city, however, predates the existence of religious temples throughout the region. In 1680, the Chapel of Our Lady of the Rosary of the Blacks was built, which still exists today but was partially destroyed due to political conflicts and wars in the 19th century.

The main church in the city, the Santo Antônio Parish, dedicated to Anthony of Padua, was established in 1718. In 2015, a fire damaged its structure, leading to its restoration and recovery. In the 2010 census, Roman Catholicism was the religion of the majority, with 26,756 adherents, or 90.69% of the population.

Paratinga also has several Protestant or Reformed denominations. In 2010, 1,970 inhabitants identified as evangelicals (6.68%), with 945 belonging to Pentecostal evangelical churches (3.20%), 220 to mission-based evangelical churches (0.75%), and 805 to unspecified evangelical churches (2.73%). Among Pentecostal evangelical churches, 301 were members of the Assemblies of God (1.02%), 110 of the Christian Congregation in Brazil (0.37%), 168 of the Universal Church of the Kingdom of God (0.57%), 20 of the Brazil for Christ Pentecostal Church (0.07%), 6 of the Foursquare Church (0.02%), and 339 of other Pentecostal churches. Among mission-based evangelical churches, 138 were Baptist (0.47%), 44 Lutheran (0.15%), and 38 Seventh-day Adventist (0.13%).

In addition to Roman Catholicism and Protestantism, there were also 119 Spiritists (0.40%), 103 Umbandists (0.35%), and 21 Jehovah's Witnesses (0.07%). Additionally, 258 individuals had no religion (0.88%), including 20 atheists (0.07%), and 103 adhered to other Afro-Brazilian religions (0.35%).

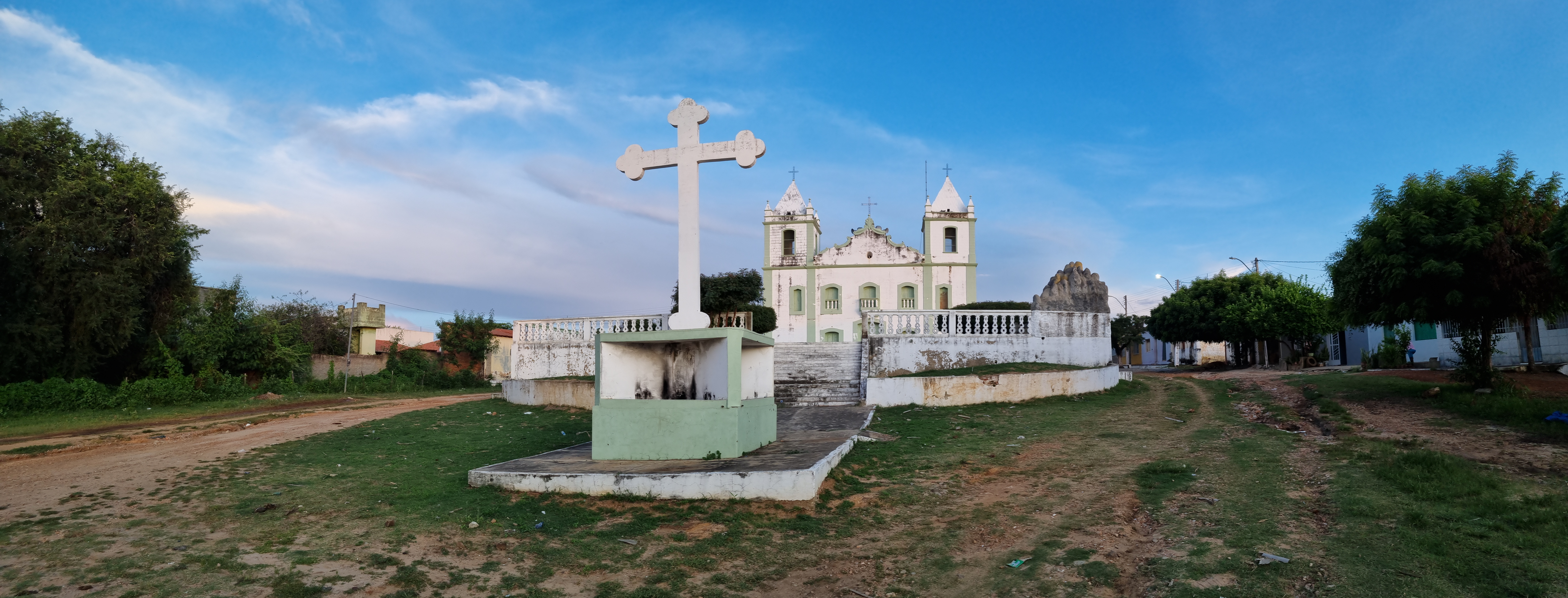
Santo Antônio Parish Church, January 2023.

== Politics ==
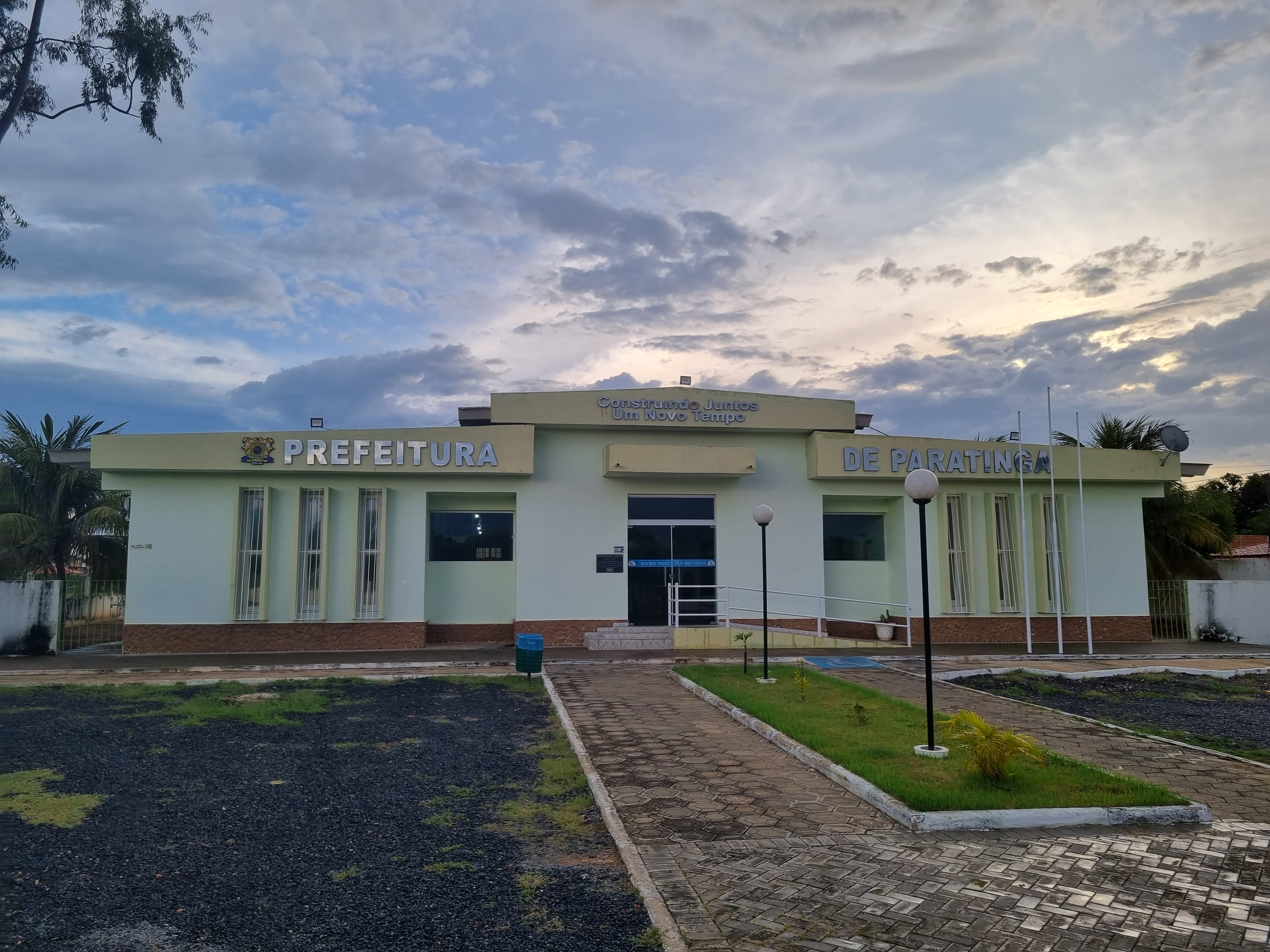
Paratinga City Hall headquarters.

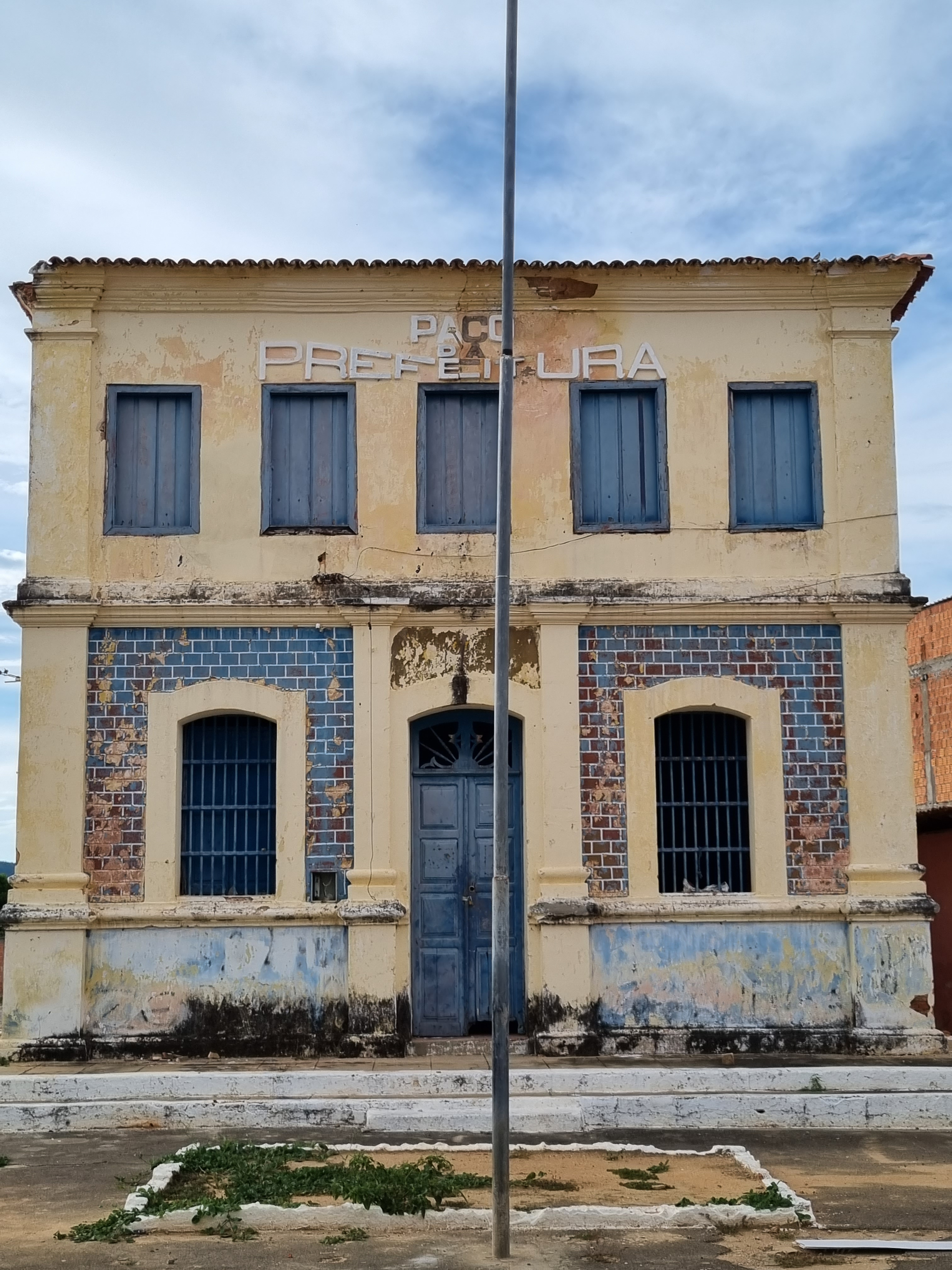
The Paratinga City Hall Palace, currently abandoned, in 2023.

Throughout its history, Paratinga has developed significant regional political relevance. One of the most prominent strongholds in the interior during the imperial period, the region was a stage for considerable disputes between the Conservative Party and the Liberal Party, as well as persecutions and armed conflicts between the two groups. The Teixeira Palha family, representing the conservatives, migrated to Goiás, while Colonel Rodrigo José de Magalhães, part of the liberals, maintained political power in the city into the republican era. The former intendant Juvêncio Cândido Xavier, son-in-law of Rodrigo José Magalhães, became a deputy, as did Pedro Carneiro da Silva. The municipality is also the birthplace of Cleuber Brandão Carneiro, former mayor of Januária and former federal deputy of Minas Gerais.

The executive power of the municipality of Paratinga is represented by the mayor, assisted by their cabinet of secretaries, in accordance with the model established by the Constitution of Brazil. The mayor is elected by direct election for a four-year term, with the possibility of re-election for a second consecutive term. The first municipal executive was the intendant Rodrigo José Magalhães, and the current mayor is Vitor Ferreira de Santana (PT), elected in the 2024 municipal elections with 69.14% of the valid votes, with José Alves Gonçalves (PSD) as vice-mayor.

The legislative power is exercised by the municipal chamber, composed of thirteen councilors elected for four-year terms. In the current legislature, which began in 2024, it consists of five seats from the Workers' Party (PT), four from the Social Democratic Party (PSD), one from Progressistas (PP), and one from Avante. The current president is Councilor Rilton Souza Novaes. The chamber is responsible for drafting and voting on fundamental laws for the administration and the executive, particularly the municipal budget (known as the Budget Guidelines Law).

In addition to the legislative process and the work of the secretariats, several municipal councils are active, including those for Health, School Feeding, and Child and Adolescent Rights. Paratinga is governed by its organic law, enacted on April 5, 1990, and was home to one of the earliest state judicial courts, inherited from the former Urubu Court, deactivated in July 2017. In addition to the city hall and municipal chamber buildings, Paratinga has a Municipal Palace, one of its historic buildings. According to the Superior Electoral Court, in November 2020, Paratinga had 23,896 voters, representing 0.219% of Bahia's electorate.

== Subdivisions ==
When it was emancipated in 1749, Paratinga was composed of several hamlets. The first to secede and later become a municipality was Macaúbas. Other cities, such as Oliveira dos Brejinhos, were also part of its territory. After Paratinga was elevated to municipality status, Bom Jesus da Lapa and Ibotirama also seceded. On June 1, 1953, the district of Águas do Paulista was created, and in the territorial division of June 1, 1960, which remains in effect, Paratinga consists of two districts: the seat district and Paulista. The urban area of the municipality is divided, in addition to the Center, into other neighborhoods, which include Tomba, Coqueiro, São João, Cruzeiro, Alto da Estrela, Paratinguinha, Pedro de Agemira, and Alcides de Oliveira Dourado. The rural area is divided into several farms, villages, and communities. In 2014, the Tomba neighborhood and the rural community of Poção de Santo Antônio were certified by the Palmares Cultural Foundation as quilombos, with the neighborhood being a kind of urban quilombo.

== Economy ==
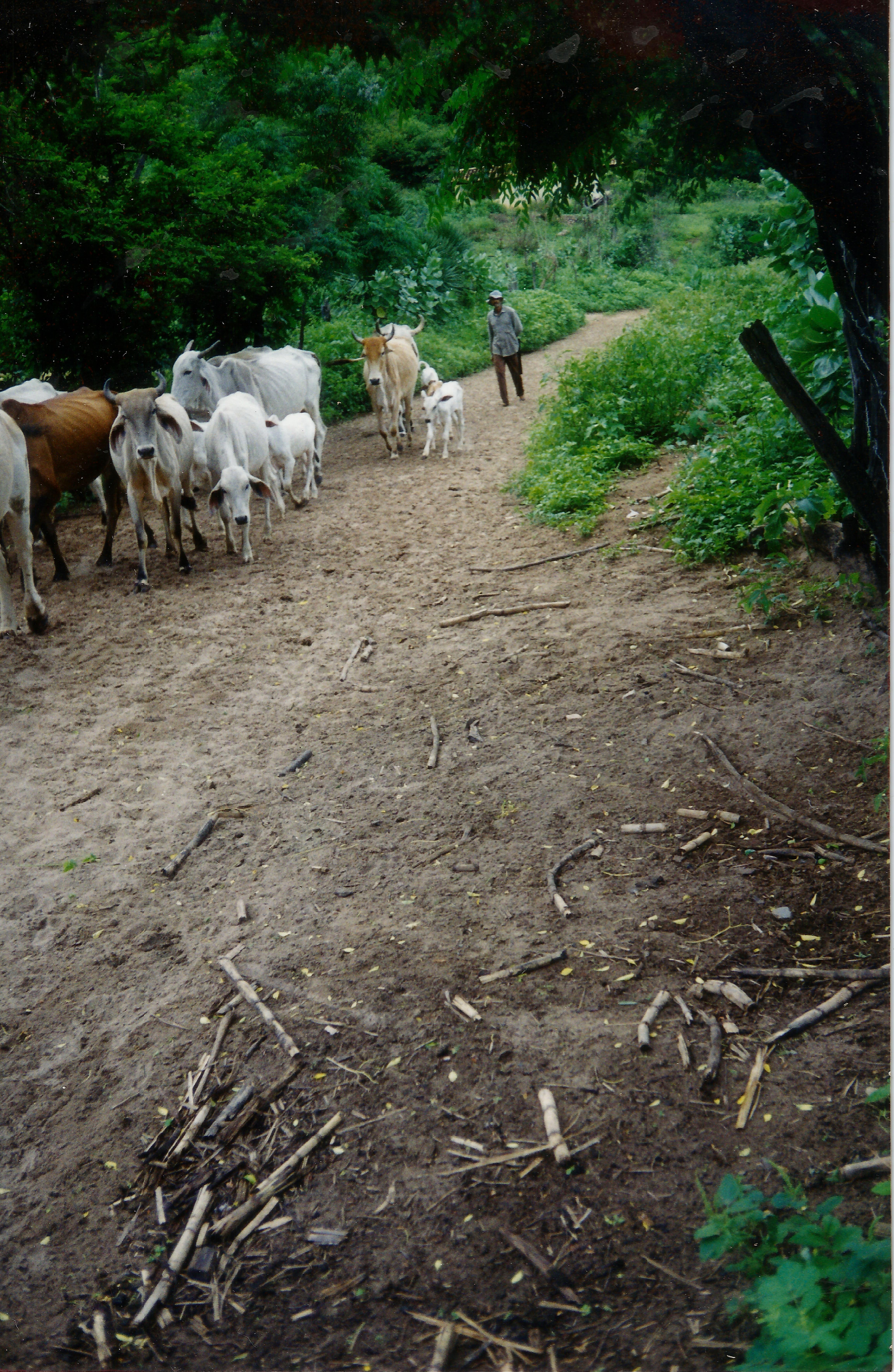
Man herding cattle in a rural community of Paratinga, 2003.

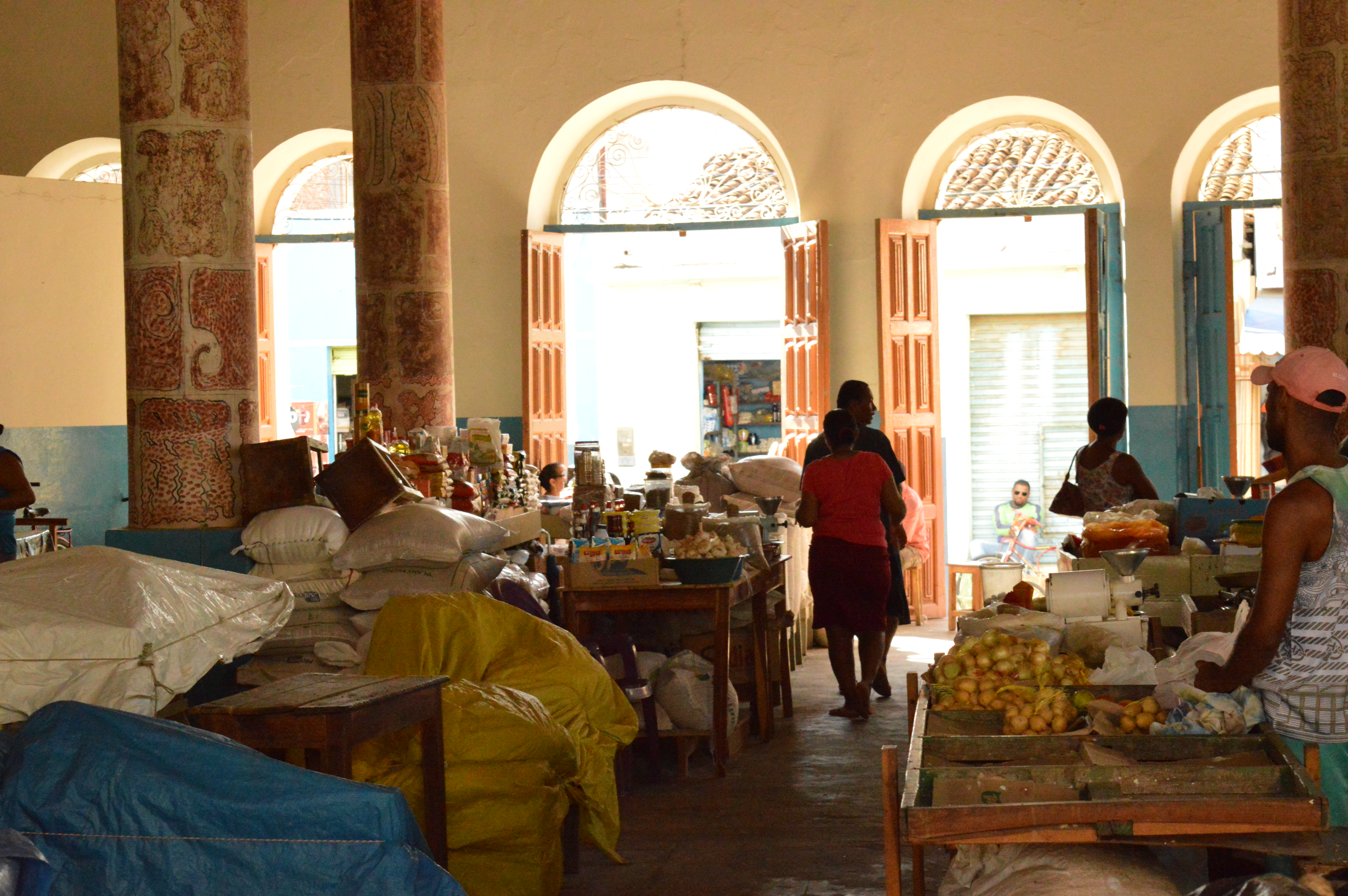
Customers shopping at the Paratinga Municipal Market.

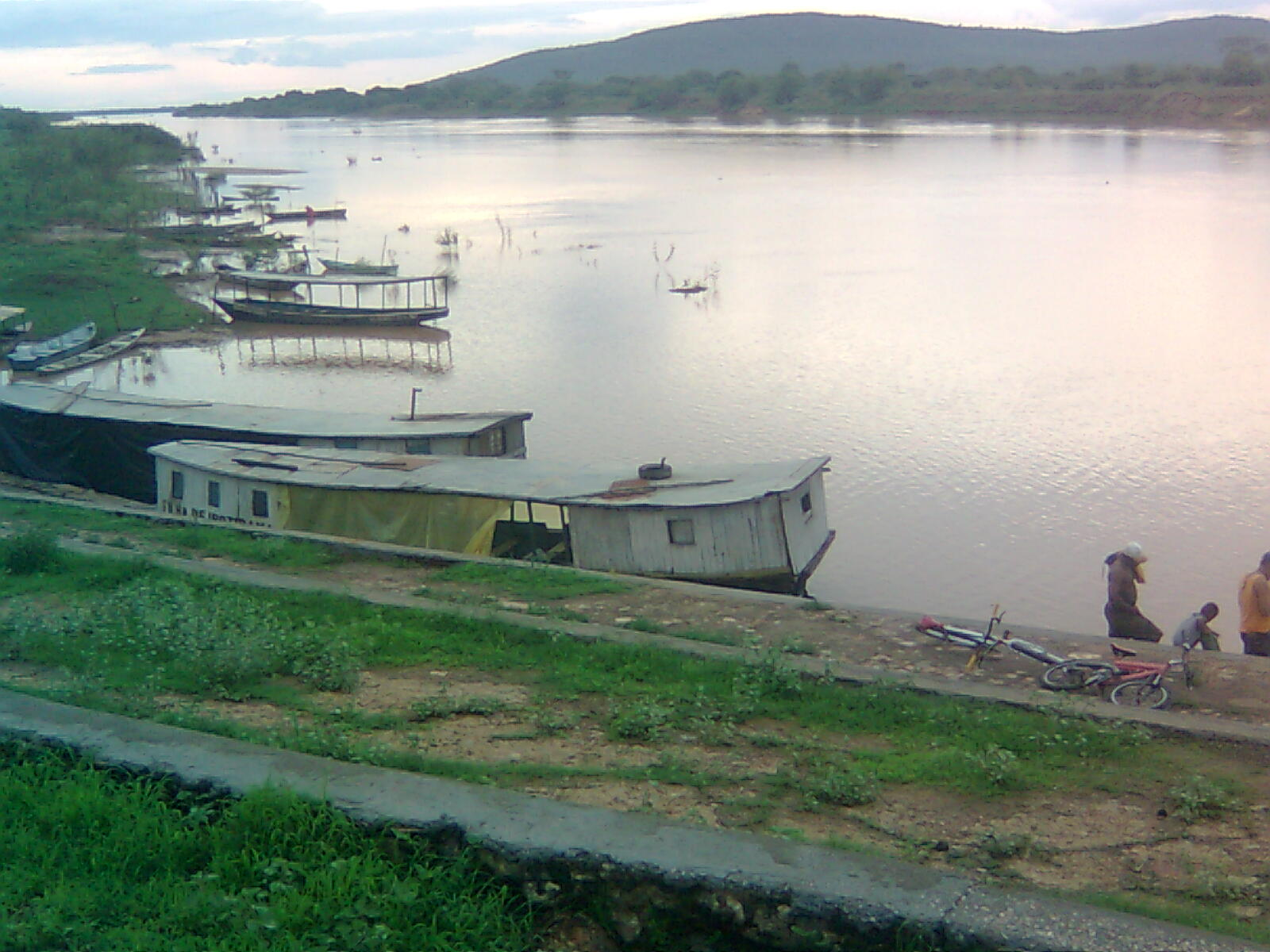
River transport has historically been one of the main economic activities in the city and continues to be practiced today.

In its early centuries, Paratinga's economy was heavily driven by primary sector activities. Livestock and agriculture were part of the daily routine for most of the population, while local commerce expanded as settlement grew in the Brazilian interior. With the presence of the São Francisco River, river transport remained a key activity for merchants, who transported goods to nearby locations such as Bom Jesus da Lapa and even more distant regions such as Jacobina and Xique-Xique. From the republican period and the settlement of the Vale do Santo Onofre, rural villages and families helped Paratinga stand out in the production of cachaça. In 1995, the municipality recorded significant sugarcane production, utilizing one thousand hectares of harvested land and ranking among the state's top producers. Today, the municipality also thrives on tourism, particularly through its district of Águas do Paulista and the Brejo das Moças.

In 2018, Paratinga's Gross Domestic Product was R$159,600 thousand, with R$48,627 thousand from the tertiary sector; R$78,291 thousand from administration, health, education, and social security; R$5,798 thousand from taxes on products net of subsidies at current prices; R$5,394 thousand from industry; and R$21,489 thousand from the primary sector. The GDP per capita was R$4,947.60. In 2016, the GDP was R$200,638.

According to the IBGE, in 2013, the municipality had a herd of 11,713 poultry (chickens, roosters, and chicks), 38,005 cattle, 1,095 sheep, 3,985 goats, 6,347 pigs, and 721 horses. In the 2014 temporary crop production, the municipality produced sugarcane (38,000), cassava (10,122), maize (3,240), beans (2,260), sorghum (1,800), and castor bean (5). In permanent crops, it produced coconut (12,000 fruits), mango (1,290), orange (225), banana (120), and guava (40). In the same year, the municipality also produced 3,651 thousand liters of milk from 10,142 milked cows, 38,000 dozen eggs, and 2,000 kilograms of honey.

In 2010, considering the municipal population aged 18 or older, 53.3% were economically active and employed, 38% were inactive, and 8.7% were active but unemployed. In the same year, among the active and employed population in the same age group, 23.03% worked in the service sector, 5.92% in commerce, 57.87% in agriculture, 6.55% in construction, 3.08% in manufacturing industries, and 0.85% in public utilities. According to the 2014 Business Registry Statistics, Paratinga had 270 local units in 2014, with 265 active. Wages and other remunerations totaled 25,187 thousand reais, and the average monthly salary in the municipality was 1.6 minimum wages.

== Infrastructure ==
The urban infrastructure sector of Paratinga is managed by the Secretariat of Infrastructure and Urban Services, which is responsible for maintaining cleanliness and promoting urban development in the city.

=== Healthcare ===
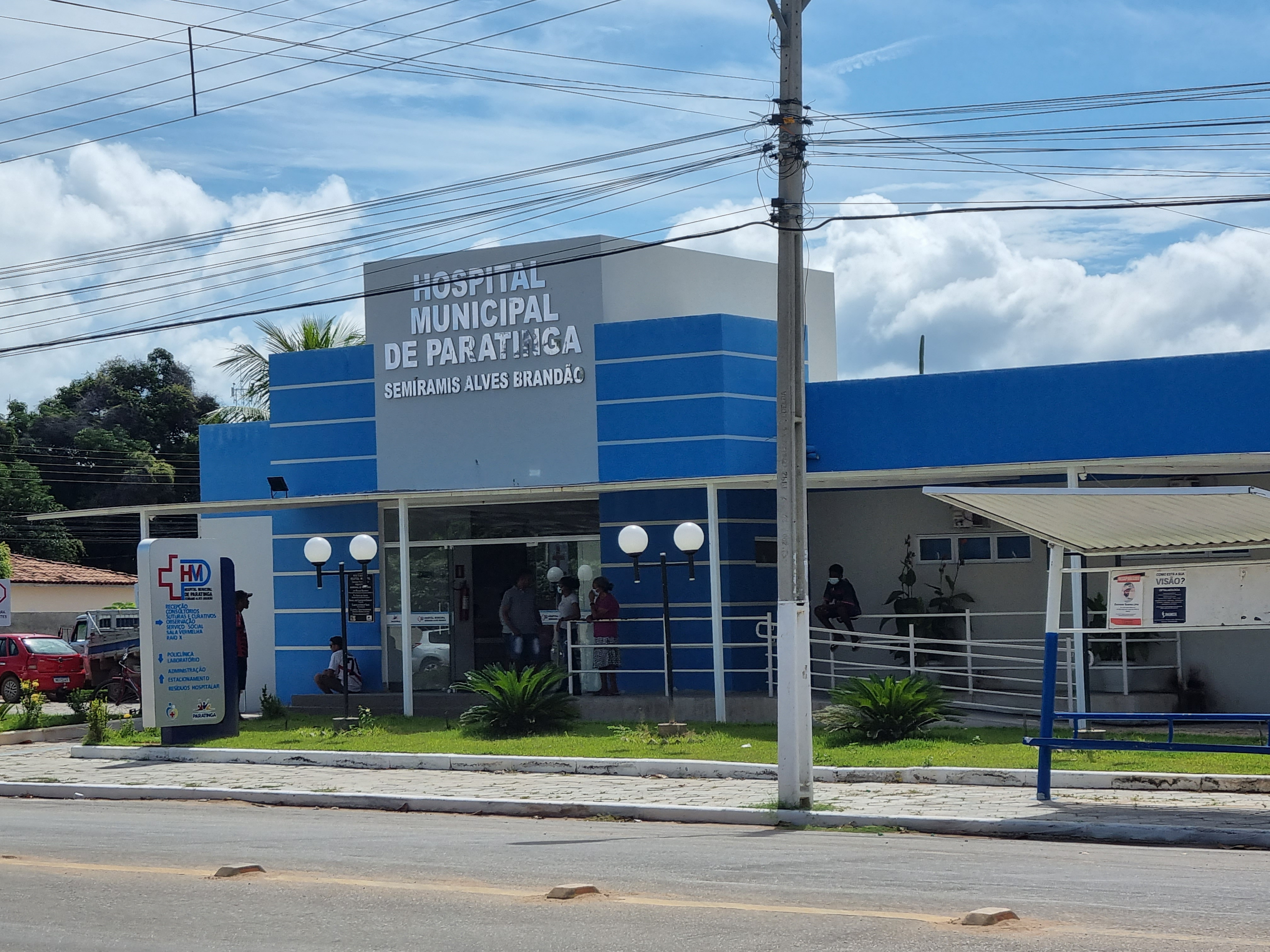
The Paratinga Municipal Hospital, established in the 1950s, is the main healthcare facility in the city.

The healthcare network in Paratinga, as of 2009, comprised seven establishments, all of which provided services to the Unified Health System (SUS), with a total of 44 hospitalization beds (all public). In April 2010, the professional healthcare workforce in the municipality consisted of 32 physicians, 21 nursing assistants, five nursing technicians, 12 nurses, three pharmacists, five dentists, three physiotherapists, one social worker, two nutritionists, and two psychologists, totaling 86 professionals.

In the same year, the life expectancy at birth was 71.5 years, the infant mortality rate was 18.2 per thousand births, and the fertility rate was 2.6 children per woman. According to data from the Ministry of Health, five cases of AIDS were recorded in Paratinga between 1990 and 2013, and from 2001 to 2011, 268 cases of dengue and forty-five cases of leishmaniasis were reported. Dengue was first recorded in the municipality in 1998. In 2014, 98.6% of children under one year of age were up to date with their vaccination schedules, and among children under two years weighed by the Family Health Program (PSF), 1.5% were malnourished.

Paratinga is part of the Western Bahia Macroregional Health Area and the Ibotirama Health Region, which also includes the municipalities of Barra and Buritirama. As a goal for the municipality, the Bahia State Health Department proposes the integration of society with health councils, aiming to increase active community participation in budgeting, conferences, and actions promoted by the council. Due to Chagas disease, the Federal Government, in partnership with the National Health Foundation (Funasa), promoted housing improvement initiatives to reduce cases. The city also has its own responsible institution, the Paratinga Municipal Health Department.

=== Education ===
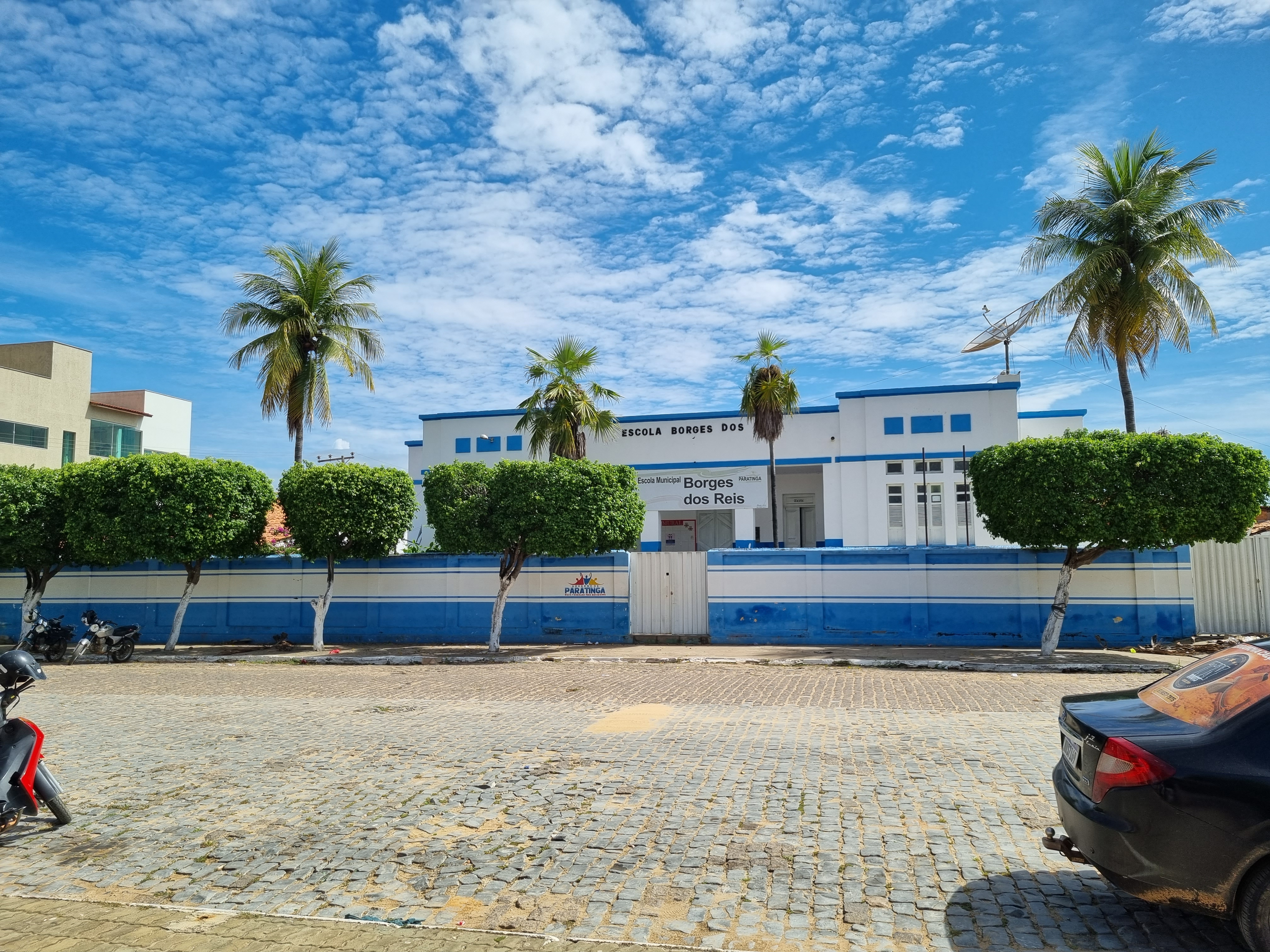
The Borges dos Reis Municipal School, January 2023.

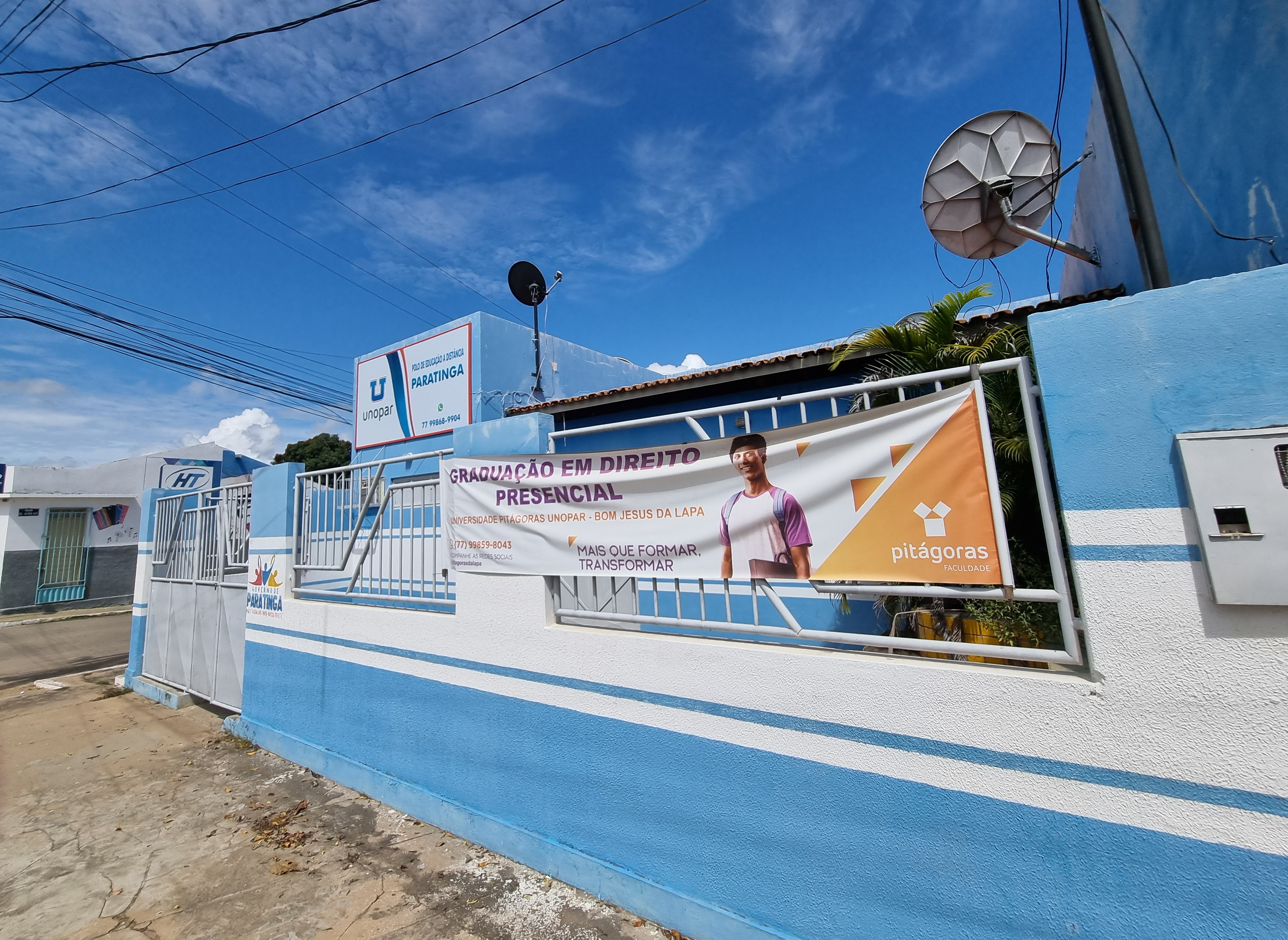
Unopar distance education campus.

In 1828, Paratinga offered public and private classes in Letters and Latin Grammar. However, the first educational institution in Paratinga was a public school, established in 1830. Paratinga has a system of primary education and secondary education, along with a variety of education professionals. In addition to primary and secondary schools, the municipality was home to the Deputado Luís Eduardo Magalhães Educational Technology Center. Founded in 2001 and maintained until the 2010s, the institute was the first public entity in the city to offer computer classes and later transformed into a higher education distance learning campus of the Universidade Norte do Paraná (Unopar).

Since the second half of the 20th century, the city has experienced growth in the education sector. In 1956, the municipality had 37 educational institutions, all public. At that time, only 20% of the population over 5 years old was literate. In 2015, Paratinga had a network of 54 primary schools (with 363 teachers), 44 preschools (90 teachers), and eight secondary schools (118 teachers). The education component of the HDI in the municipality reached 0.510 in 2010, while the literacy rate of the population over ten years, according to the 2010 census, was 77.6% (76.2% for men and 79.1% for women). The completion rates for primary education (ages 15 to 17) and secondary education (ages 18 to 24) were 43.6% and 34.3%, respectively, with a literacy rate of 95.0% for the population aged 15 to 24.

In the late 1990s, the municipal government, along with investments from the Fund for the Maintenance and Development of Primary Education and Teacher Training (Fundef), launched initiatives to establish school clusters and provide transportation to students from rural villages. These initiatives aimed to increase enrollment and retention rates in the city's schools and provide assistance to students. As a result, in 1998 and 1999, Paratinga was featured in a report sponsored by the Ministry of Education (MEC) as a national reference. According to data from the National Treasury Secretariat organized by the Center for Metropolitan Studies (CEM), in 2015, the city government allocated 50.1% of its budget to education, a higher expenditure than 95.81% of Brazilian municipalities. The per capita amount was equivalent to R$871.03.

In 2010, Paratinga had an expected duration of schooling of 8.87 years, higher than the state average (8.63 years). The percentage of children aged 5 to 6 attending school was 96.19%, and those aged 11 to 13 attending primary school was 76.86%. Among young people, the proportion of those aged 15 to 17 with completed primary education was 49.40%, and those aged 18 to 20 with completed secondary education was 29.52%. Considering only the population aged 25 or older, 25.15% had completed primary education, 17.02% had completed secondary education, and 1.48% had completed higher education. Additionally, 32.67% were illiterate. In 2014, the age-grade distortion among primary school students, i.e., those older than the recommended age, was 28.1% for the initial years and 47% for the final years, with a distortion of 52.3% in secondary education.

=== Safety, violence, and crime ===
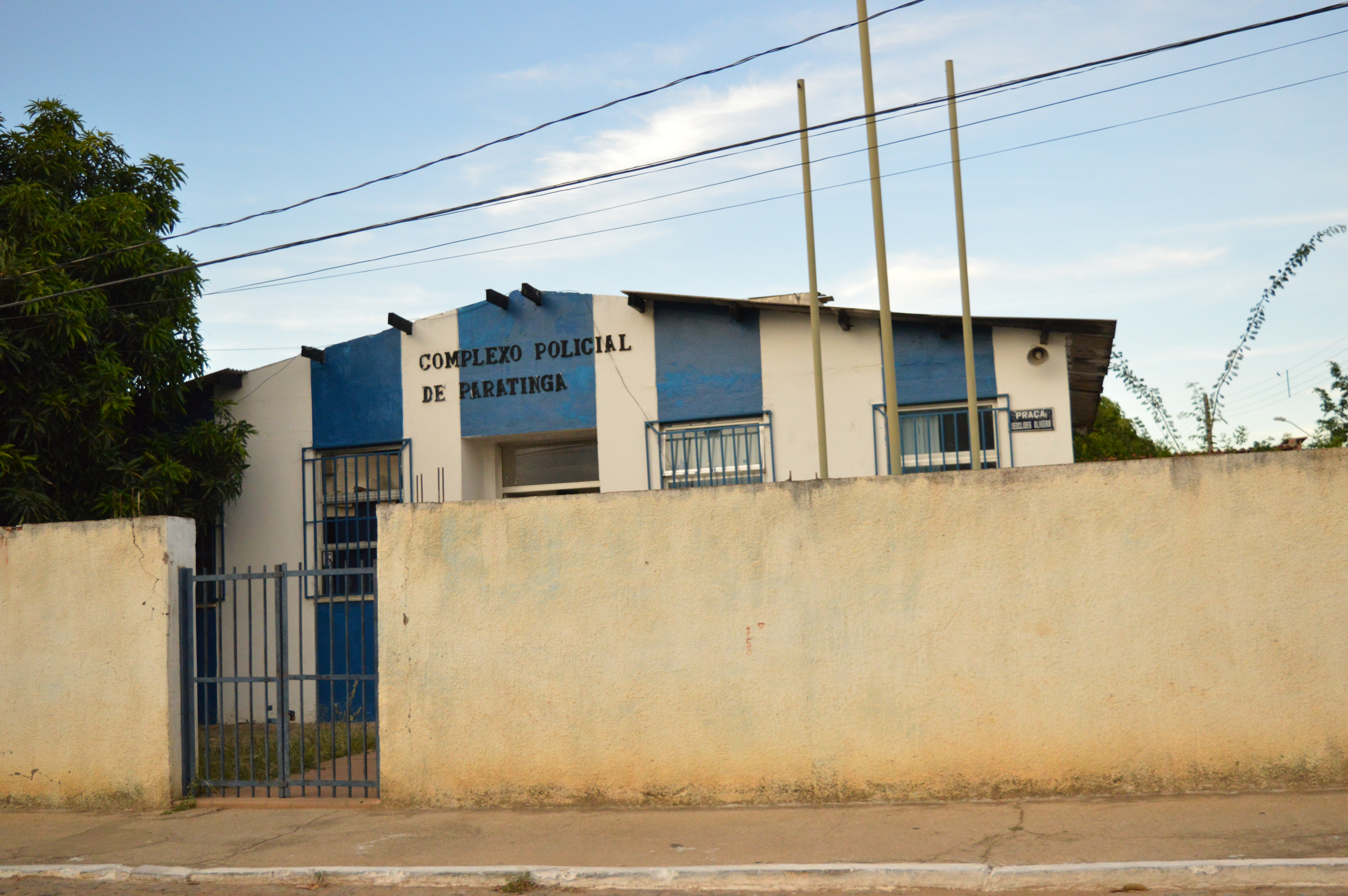
Paratinga Police Complex, in 2017.

According to the 2014 Violence Map, with data from 2012, published by the Sangari Institute, among municipalities with more than 20,000 inhabitants, the homicide rate in the municipality was 3.3 per 100,000 inhabitants, ranking 2580th nationally. The suicide rate that year was 0.0 per 100,000 inhabitants, with only two confirmed deaths between 2008 and 2012. Regarding the rate of deaths from traffic accidents, the index was 10.0 per 100,000 inhabitants, ranking 1374th nationally. The 24th Civil Police Coordination Office of Bom Jesus da Lapa is responsible for the region and works alongside the Paratinga Municipal Guard, which has its own building.

The municipal and state governments have implemented initiatives to combat and prevent violence in the city, such as lectures and discussions on school bullying, organized by the Municipal Education Secretariat in collaboration with the Military Police in 2014, through the "Conversando com a Escola" project. Paratinga is located in a state where the rate of violence against women reached 9,800 cases in the first quarter of 2016 alone. In the municipality, the number of female deaths is low. In 2014, there were no recorded deaths attributed to external injuries. The total number of deaths during this period was seven.

=== Housing, services, and communications ===
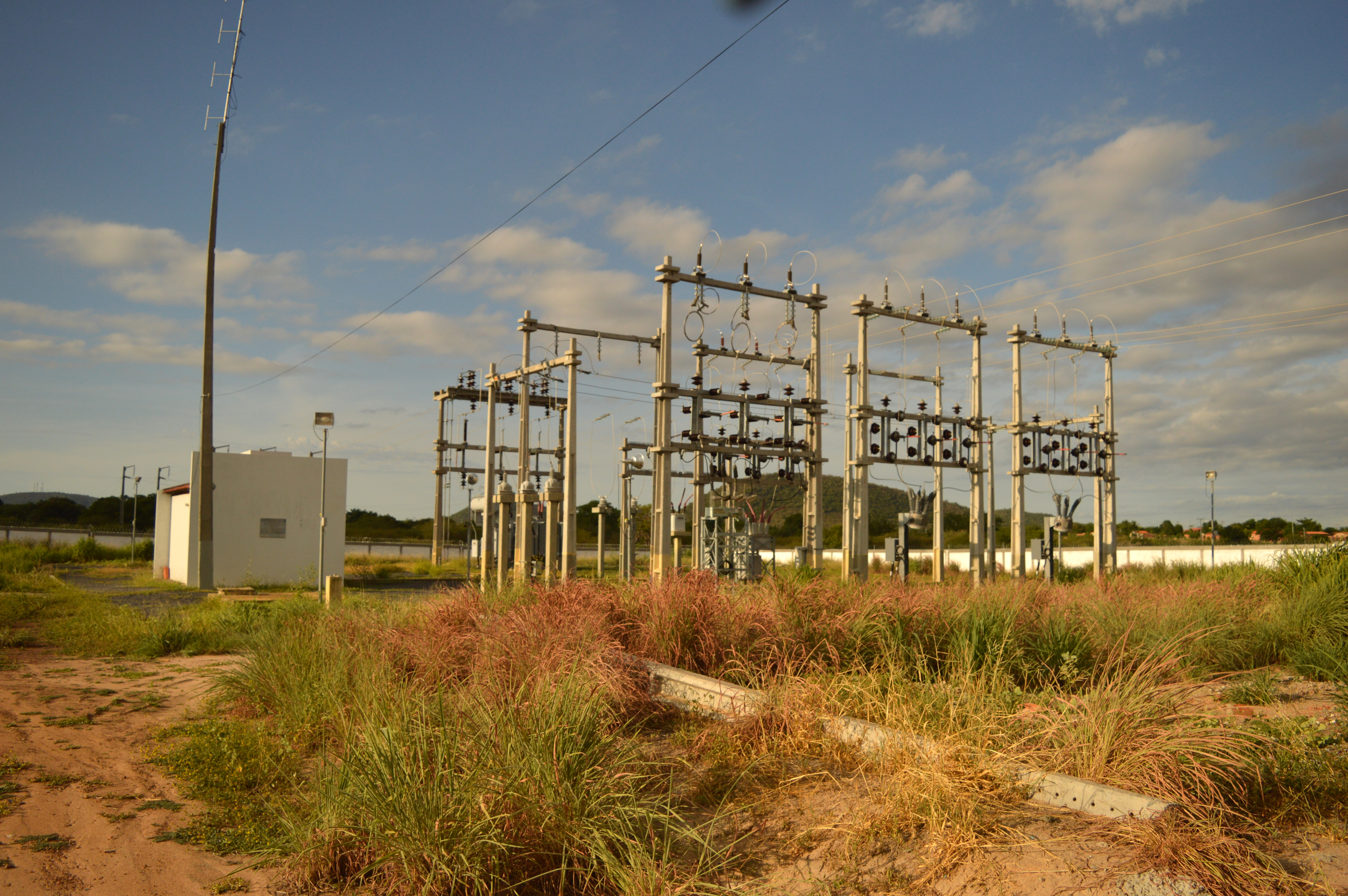
Paratinga Power Substation, in January 2017.

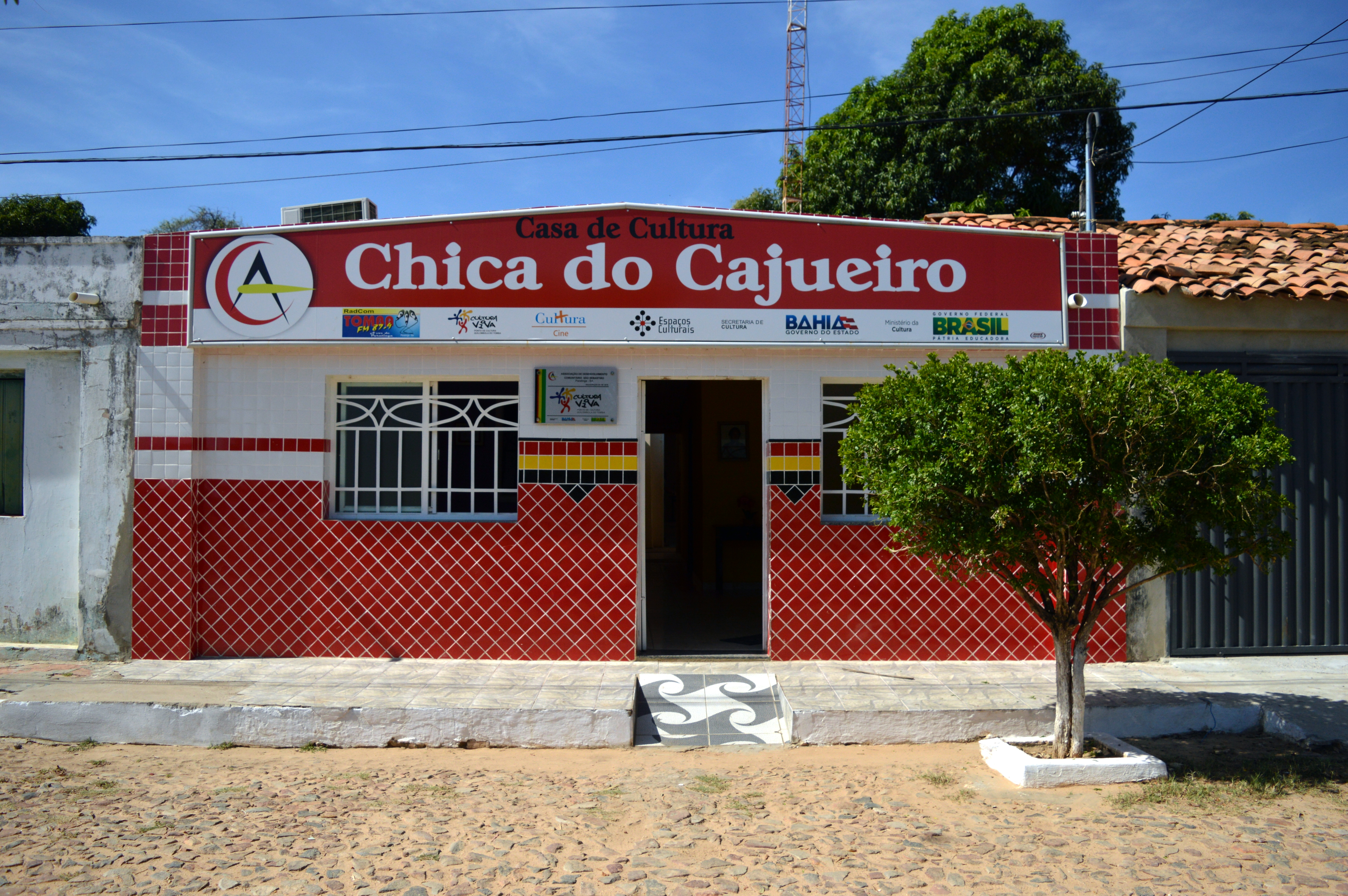
The Tomba FM radio station is housed in the Chica do Cajueiro Cultural Center, which is located in the Tomba neighborhood.

In 2010, Paratinga had 7,211 households, of which 2,832 were in urban areas (39.27%) and 4,379 in rural areas (60.73%). Of these, 6,537 were owned (90.65%), with 6,517 fully paid (90.38%) and 20 in the process of acquisition (0.28%); 300 were rented (4.16%), and 349 were provided (4.84%), with 24 by employers (0.33%) and 325 through other means (4.51%). Another 25 were occupied under other conditions (0.35%).

The water supply service is provided by the Autonomous Water and Sewage Service (SAAE), managed by the municipal government and by the Bahia Environmental Engineering and Water Resources Company (Cerb), through the "Água para Todos" program. In 2010, 4,588 households were supplied by the general network (63.63%); 1,655 through wells or springs (22.95%); 137 via rivers, dams, lakes, and/or streams (1.90%); 354 from rainwater (4.91%), 219 from water trucks (3.04%), and 258 through other means (3.58%). The company responsible for electricity supply is the Bahia State Electricity Company (COELBA). The nominal voltage of the grid is 220 volts. Of the total households, 6,734 had electricity (93.39%), with 6,674 from the distribution company (92.55%) and 60 from other source(s) (0.83%). Garbage was collected in 7,355 households (91.57%), with 6,197 through cleaning services (77.15%) and 1,158 via dumpsters (14.42%). All waste produced in Paratinga is disposed of in a landfill.

The area code (DDD) for Paratinga is 077 and the postal code (CEP) is 47500–000. In 2016, Paratinga had one FM radio station, Tomba FM, characterized as a community radio. On January 19, 2009, the municipality began to benefit from telephone number portability, along with other localities with DDDs 31 in Minas Gerais; 42 in Paraná; 79 in Sergipe, as well as other municipalities with codes 75 and 77 in Bahia. According to 2010 census data, 3,563 households had only mobile phones (49.40%), 394 had both mobile and landline phones (5.46%), and 168 had only landline phones (2.32%).

Throughout its history, Paratinga has had several newspapers or periodical publications. One of the most prominent, O Ibopatinga, was founded in 1958 by students from Paratinga and the neighboring city, Ibotirama. It focused on news, culture, and was part of a local left-wing nationalist movement called the Paratinga Nationalist Front. In addition to being featured in newspapers from neighboring cities, the municipality was covered by reports and opinion articles published in various national and regional outlets, such as Folha de S.Paulo, Jornal da Bahia, O Pasquim and Nova Fronteira. During the 1980s, the Communist Party of Brazil (PCdoB) circulated the Jornal Construção, which was active during the transition from the Military Regime to the New Republic and published critiques of the local government. In the 1990s, Linha Direta was published, aiming to cover culture, politics, sports, and leisure with a monthly periodicity.

=== Transportation ===
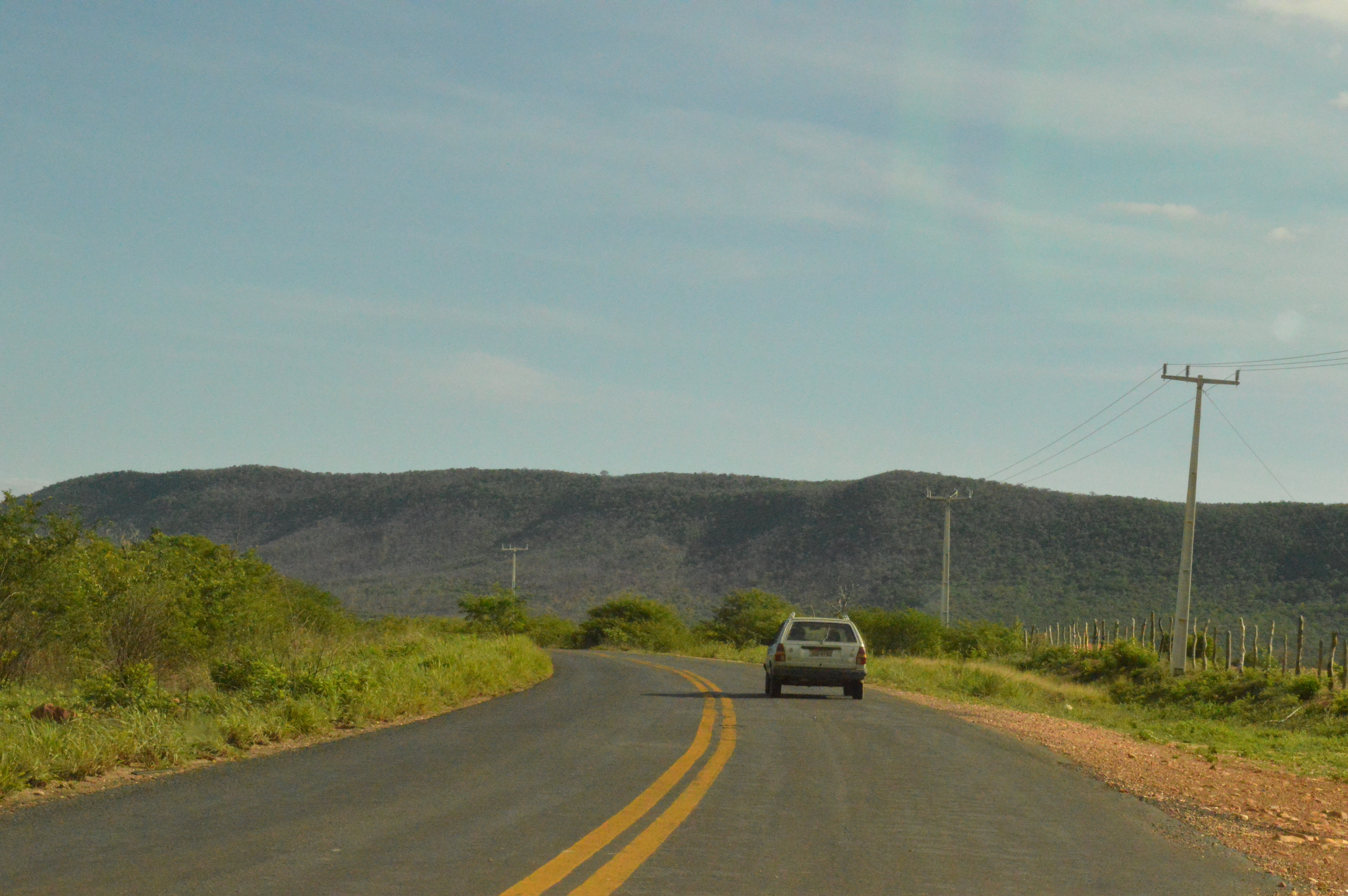
The BA-160, in Paratinga, January 2017.

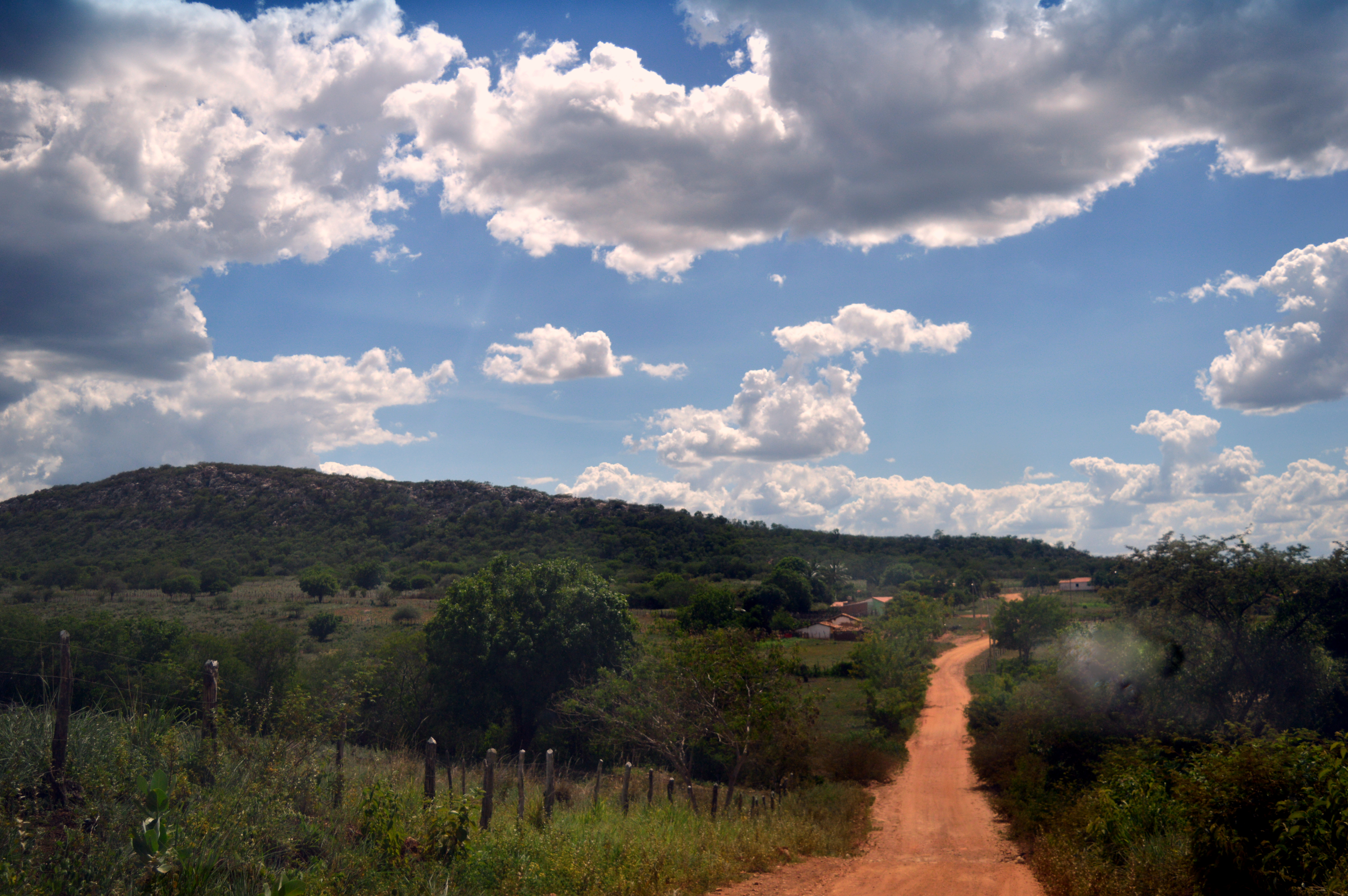
Rural road to the district of Águas do Paulista.

Until the mid-20th century, Paratinga had several means of transportation. During its early centuries, river transport was crucial for the movement of goods and people, and it is still in use today. According to the Encyclopedia of Municipalities, published in the late 1950s, Paratinga was also connected to other cities via highways and rural roads. Through its bus terminal, the municipality was linked to the city of Rio de Janeiro, Salvador, and other major cities. Until the 1980s, Paratinga had an airstrip, which was later closed. Since then, the municipality has lacked such facilities. The municipality began receiving traffic lights, some road signs, and urban signage in 2018.

The municipal vehicle fleet in 2015 consisted of 1,564 motorcycles, 824 cars, 379 pickup trucks, 118 scooters, 72 trucks, 40 minibuses, 37 vans, 48 buses, three tractor-trucks, three utility vehicles, and 29 in other categories, totaling 3,117 vehicles. There is also limited public transportation dedicated to transporting children from rural areas to schools in the urban center of Paratinga.

In terms of road transport, the city has a bus terminal. The municipality is located in the Brazilian state with the second-largest road network in the country. The BA-160, a highway that runs through Paratinga, was paved during the administration of Nilo Moraes Coelho in the 1990s to facilitate the transport of agricultural production from the Projeto Formoso. This road, maintained by the Bahia state government, connects Paratinga to several cities in western Bahia. These include Barra, Xique-Xique, Ibotirama, Bom Jesus da Lapa, Iuiú, and Malhada, extending toward Minas Gerais. The Ibotirama-Paratinga-Lapa section crosses indigenous territories. In 2008, it was ranked the fifth worst highway in Bahia by Guia Quatro Rodas, described as follows: "Before taking this road, visit the Grotto of the Bom Jesus da Lapa Sanctuary and pray fervently to Saint Christopher for protection." In 2010, it was deemed the worst highway in Brazil according to an assessment by the National Transport Confederation (CNT). Two years later, in 2012, Editora Abril's Guia Quatro Rodas ranked the Lapa-Paratinga-Ibotirama section of BA-160 as the sixth worst highway in Brazil based on a survey. The 2018 CNT survey classified the highway's condition as "poor."

Paratinga also has local roads connecting the urban area to farms, communities, and rural villages, as well as providing shorter routes to other municipalities. These include the regions of the villages forming the Águas do Paulista district, the Caatingas road, Riacho dos Porcos–Zezé, Junco–Volta da Serra, Pau do Bobo–Muquém, Bom Sucesso, and the Boqueirão road, which passes through the villages of Agreste and Boqueirão de Regino. This road is used by drivers as a shorter route to the municipality of Macaúbas. These roads are maintained by the Paratinga Municipal Government, through the Secretariat of Infrastructure and Urban Services.

== Culture ==
The Municipal Secretariat of Culture and Racial Equality is the municipal body responsible for education, culture, tourism, and religious activities in Paratinga, overseeing the organization of cultural projects and events. It was established in March 2016, having been separated from the Secretariat of Education following demands from local social and cultural groups.

=== Architecture and historical heritage ===
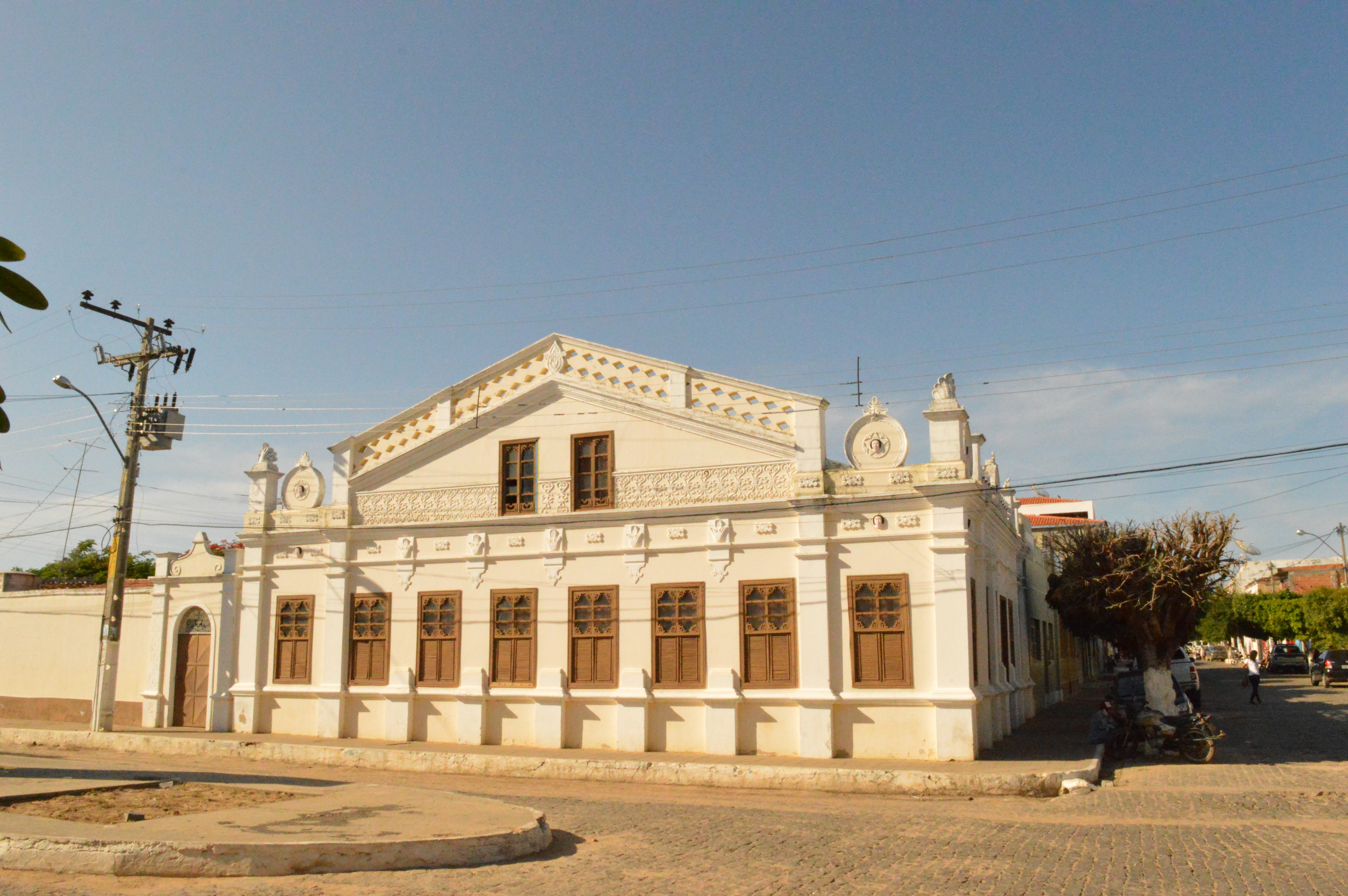
Building of the former Rio Branco Cultural Center, January 2017.

As a city with centuries-old origins, Paratinga boasts structures and cultural assets that reflect not only its own history but also that of the western São Francisco region. The municipality preserves characteristics from various artistic periods, such as Neo Baroque-style houses, particularly in urban centers. Buildings in older areas, especially the Parish Church, exhibit influences from Baroque, mixed styles, and Art Deco.

However, the preservation state of much of its historical and cultural heritage remains uncertain. In 2001, a logbook from the Engenheiro Halfeld Expedition, passing through the city, praised the condition of Paratinga's historic buildings. Conversely, a 2002 study by the Legislative Assembly of Minas Gerais (ALEMG), part of the São Francisco River World Heritage Campaign, stated that the municipality's assets were "abandoned to their fate." In December 2015, a fire destroyed much of the city's main structure, the Parish Church, which subsequently underwent restoration. In 2004, the city government requested an assessment from the Institute of Artistic and Cultural Heritage of Bahia regarding Paratinga's structures for potential historical designation.

The influence of pre-colonial populations is also present in the city. The Lapinha Grotto, for instance, is one of the sites where rock art can be found. The neighboring municipality of Sítio do Mato, which was once part of Paratinga, also has ceramic fragments and artworks. In certain rural areas, such as the village of Boqueirão de Regino, similar drawings exist.

=== Literature and music ===
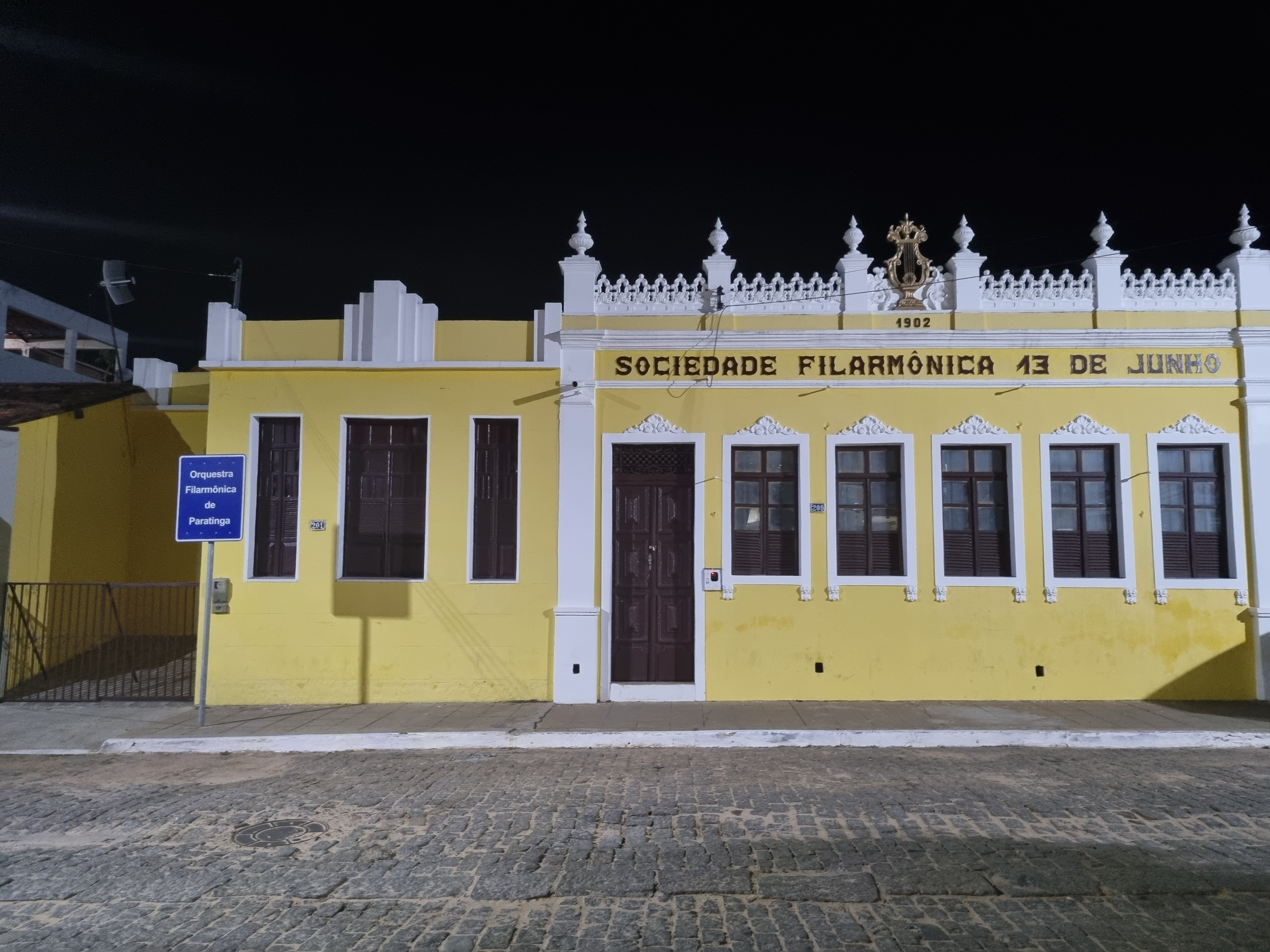
The June 13 Philharmonic Society in Paratinga is one of the oldest institutions of its kind in Bahia.

During the 18th and 19th centuries, Paratinga was the subject of various records and accounts, now documented in works about the history of Brazil and Bahia. One of the most notable and controversial accounts comes from historian Teodoro Sampaio, who, in 1879, described Paratinga as an old, poor, and unattractive village. In the 20th century, particularly with the founding of the newspaper O Ibopatinga, several writers, including journalists and future academics, contributed to content production. Among them, José Evandro de Oliveira Brandão, a poet and journalist, stands out. Another prominent figure in Paratinga's literature is Carlos Fernando Filgueiras de Magalhães, a doctor, researcher, essayist, and author of several works, who graduated in medicine from the Federal University of Goiás, lived in Goiânia for decades, and later received the Jaburu Trophy, the most prestigious award in Goiás.

One of the oldest and most traditional forms of cultural expression in Paratinga is the June 13 Philharmonic Society, an orchestra founded in 1902 and considered one of Bahia's leading philharmonic orchestras. The group performs at various municipal events, including the feasts of Saint Anthony, the Divine, Our Lady of Conception, Saint Sebastian, as well as weddings, official ceremonies, and other cultural activities. Another local band, Zabumba Alecrim, formed by residents of rural and peripheral areas of Paratinga, is said by experts to represent the municipality's African roots.

Over time, two books have been published highlighting aspects of the municipality's history. The first, Sociedade Filarmônica 13 de Junho: 100 Anos de Tradição e Cultura (2006), was written by Carlos Fernando Filgueiras de Magalhães. The second, Histórias de Paratinga (2019), was authored by journalist Tiago Abreu.

=== Attractions and events ===
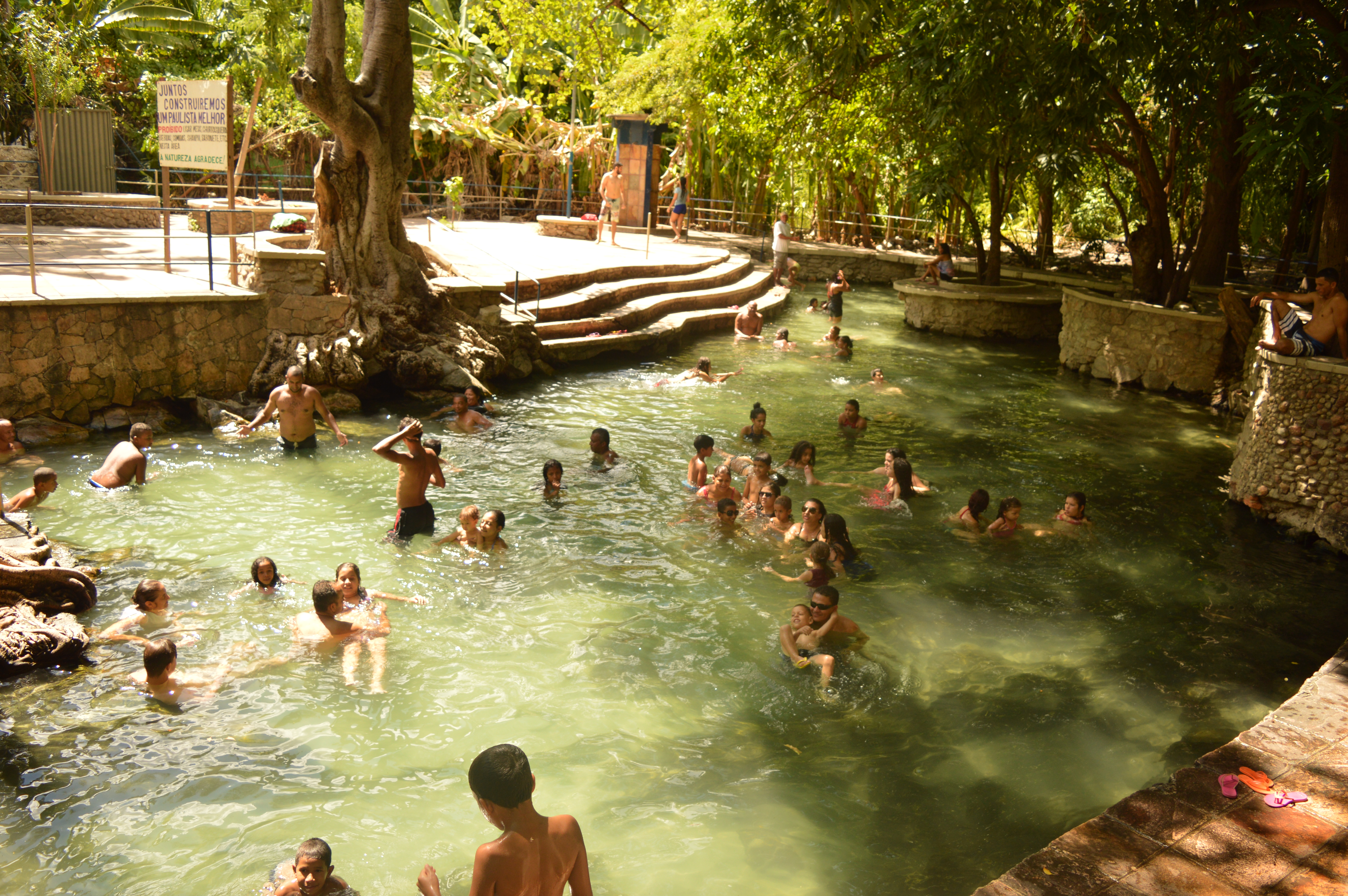
Bathers in Águas do Paulista, 2017.

Paratinga features several tourist attractions spread across different parts of the municipality. The main one is located in the Águas do Paulista district, 34 km from the downtown area. It is notable for its natural thermal-mineral water pools and nearby bars and leisure spaces. Another attraction is the Brejo das Moças spa, also characterized by natural, warm water.

Along the São Francisco River, another highlight is the Port Quay; the Saint Anthony Parish Church, established in the mid-18th century; the 2 de Julho Square, where major annual events such as Carnival, Festa Junina, performances by national and regional artists, the city's anniversary, and others take place; the Rio Branco Cultural Center, built in the 20th century; and the Municipal Market, constructed in 1938 and still fully operational; and the Paratinga Island, considered the largest island in the São Francisco River. Additionally, Paratinga is home to the Benjamim de Souza Filho Vaquejada Park, which hosts vaquejada events and various musical performances.

Paratinga also hosts numerous religious and folklore events. In January, the Folia de Reis takes place, involving masses, performances with bands, and caretagem. In February, the city celebrates Carnival, traditionally held at 2 de Julho Square. In May, Whitsun is celebrated; in June, the feasts of Saint Anthony and Saint John coincide with the city's anniversary. In December, the Feast of Our Lady of Conception is held.

=== Sports ===
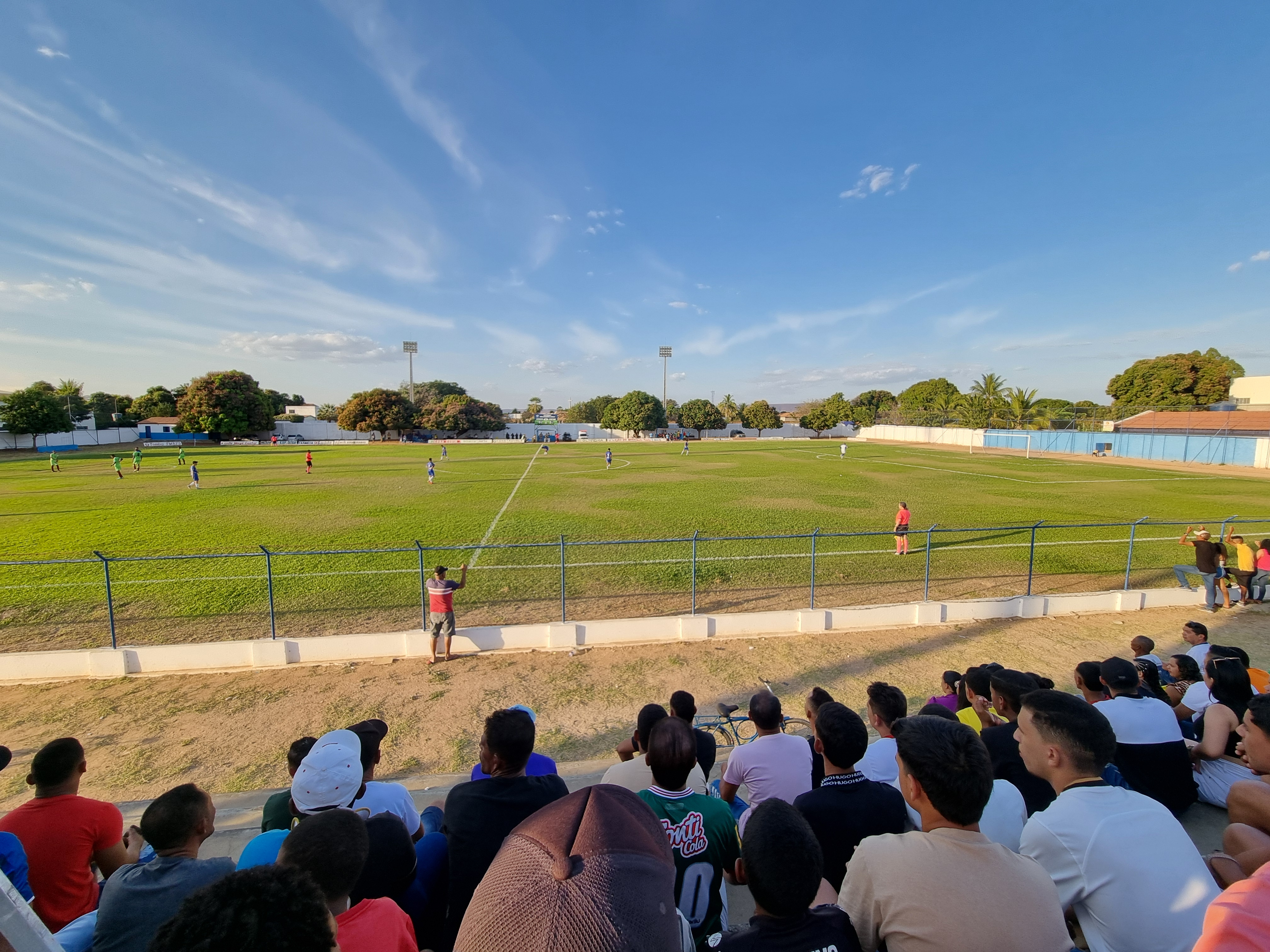
Fans at Waldemiro Cruz Stadium, 2024.

Paratinga hosts an amateur football championship involving several teams, and also has a team, Liga Esportiva Paratinguense, which has competed in the Bahia Intermunicipal Soccer Championship since 1993. In rural areas, regional championships are held in three locations: Beira Rio-Paulista, Santo Onofre, and Caatingas. Other cultural initiatives are outlined in the Culture Calendar, managed by the Municipal Secretariat of Culture and Racial Equality.

The main sports venue in the municipality is the Waldemiro Cruz Municipal Stadium, established in October 1980 with a capacity of 1,300 people. The municipal government and Liga Esportiva Paratinguense maintain the stadium. Additionally, Paratinga has four sports courts in its urban area, most built between the 1980s and 1990s and linked to public school facilities. In rural areas, the court in the Agreste village stands out. These are maintained by affiliated schools, banking associations, and the municipal government.

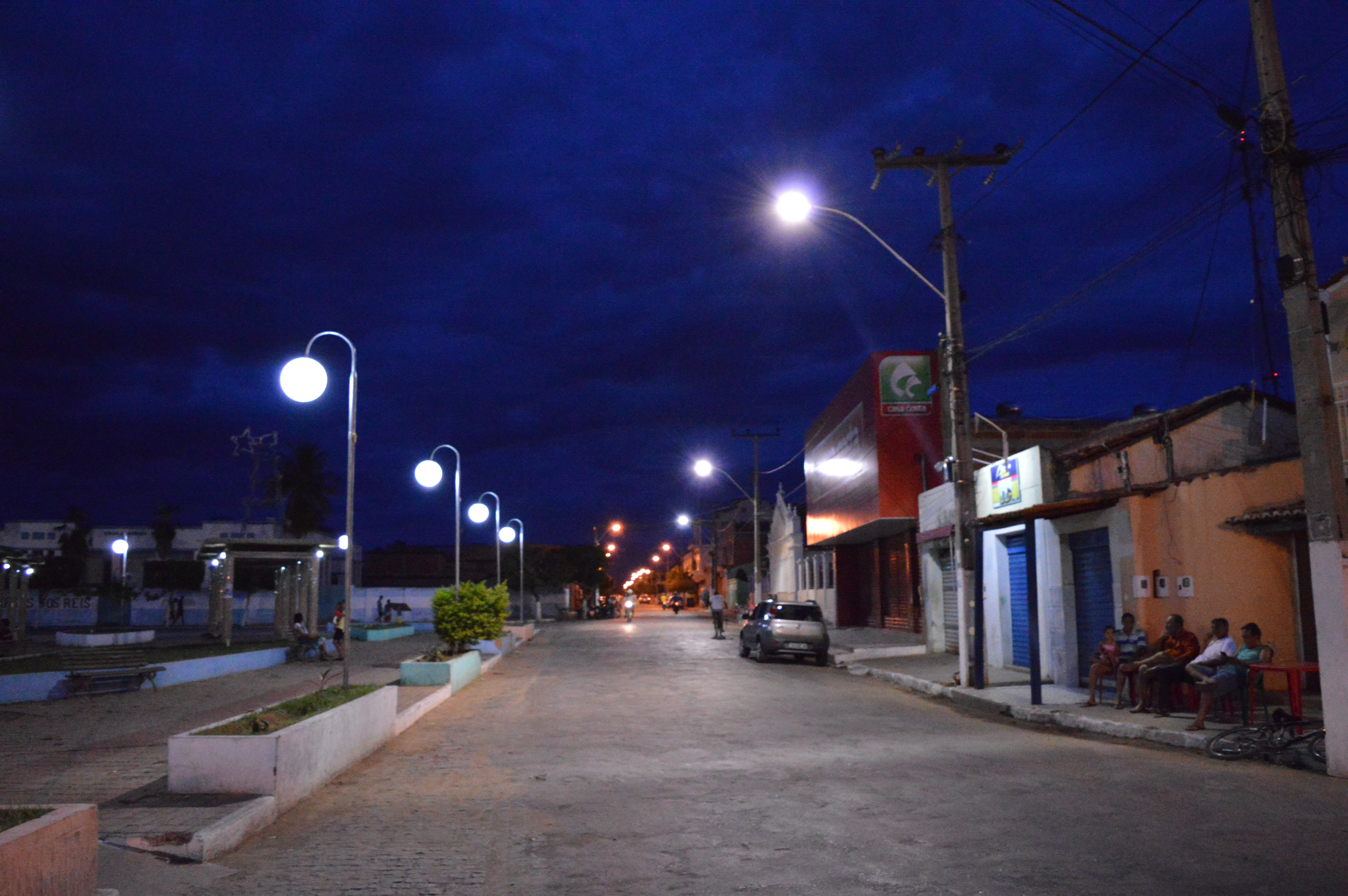
2 de Julho Square at night.

=== Nightlife and cuisine ===
Paratinga's nightlife is characterized by its bars, squares, and leisure spaces. Concentrated in the urban area and particularly in the tourist areas of the Águas do Paulista district, the municipality offers attractions featuring music and events. The hotel network is limited but includes some hotels in the urban area and in Paulista.

Paratinga's cuisine is distinguished by locally produced foods. Breakfast in Paratinga often includes the avoador, a white biscuit made from flour, which is a highlight of local harvests. Other typical foods include tapioca biscuits, cachaça, and rapadura.

=== Holidays ===
According to Municipal Decree No. 006 of 2015, in addition to national and state holidays and three optional holidays, Paratinga observes five municipal holidays: Saint Sebastian (January 20), Saint Anthony, "Patron Saint of our parish" (June 13), the city's anniversary (June 25), Evangelical Day (August 5), and Our Lady of Conception (December 8).

== See also ==
- List of municipalities in Bahia
