= Cafarnaum =

Municipality of Bahia State, Brazil

- Municipality
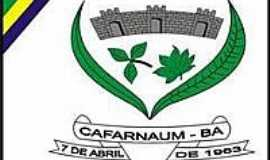
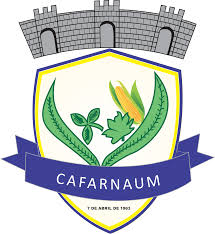
- Flag Coat of arms

- Location in Brazil
- Coordinates: 11°42′S 41°28′W
- Country: Brazil
- Region: Nordeste
- State: Bahia

Population (2020)
  - Total: 18,513
- Time zone: UTC−3 (BRT)

Cafarnaum is a municipality in the state of Bahia in the North-East region of Brazil. It was named in tribute to Capernaum (Cafarnaum in Portuguese means Capernaum).

== See also ==
- List of municipalities in Bahia
