= Mulungu do Morro =

Municipality of Bahia, Brazil

Coordinates: 11°57′S 41°37′W

- Municipality
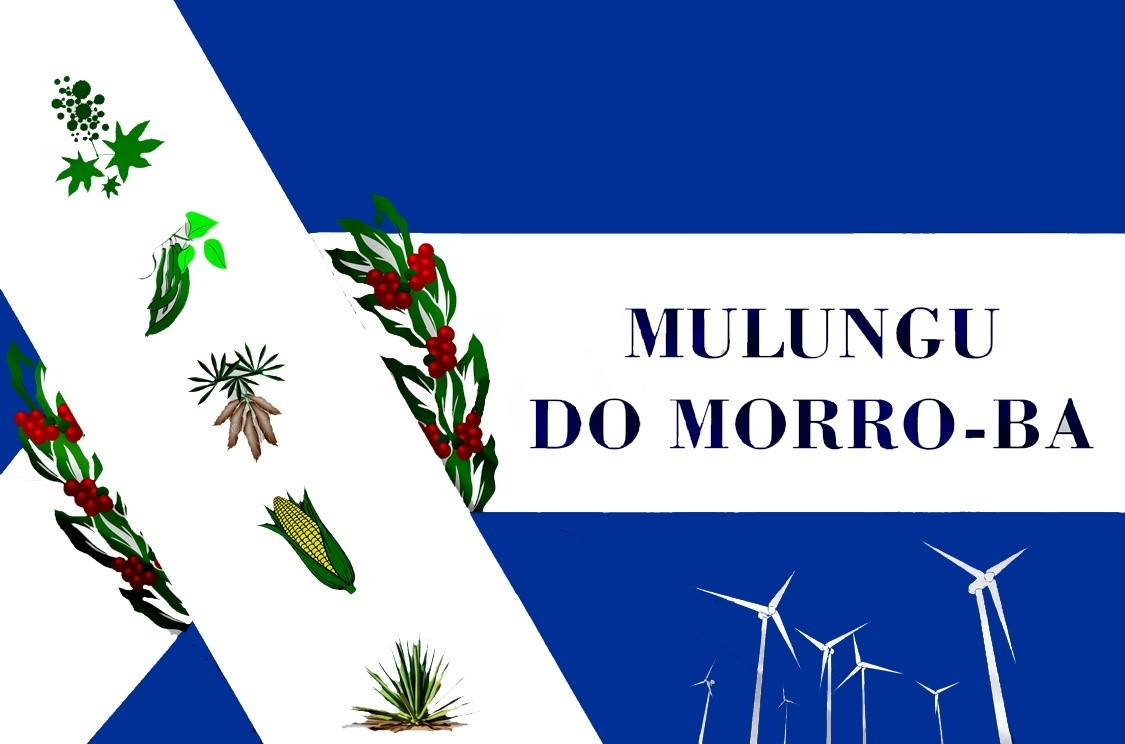
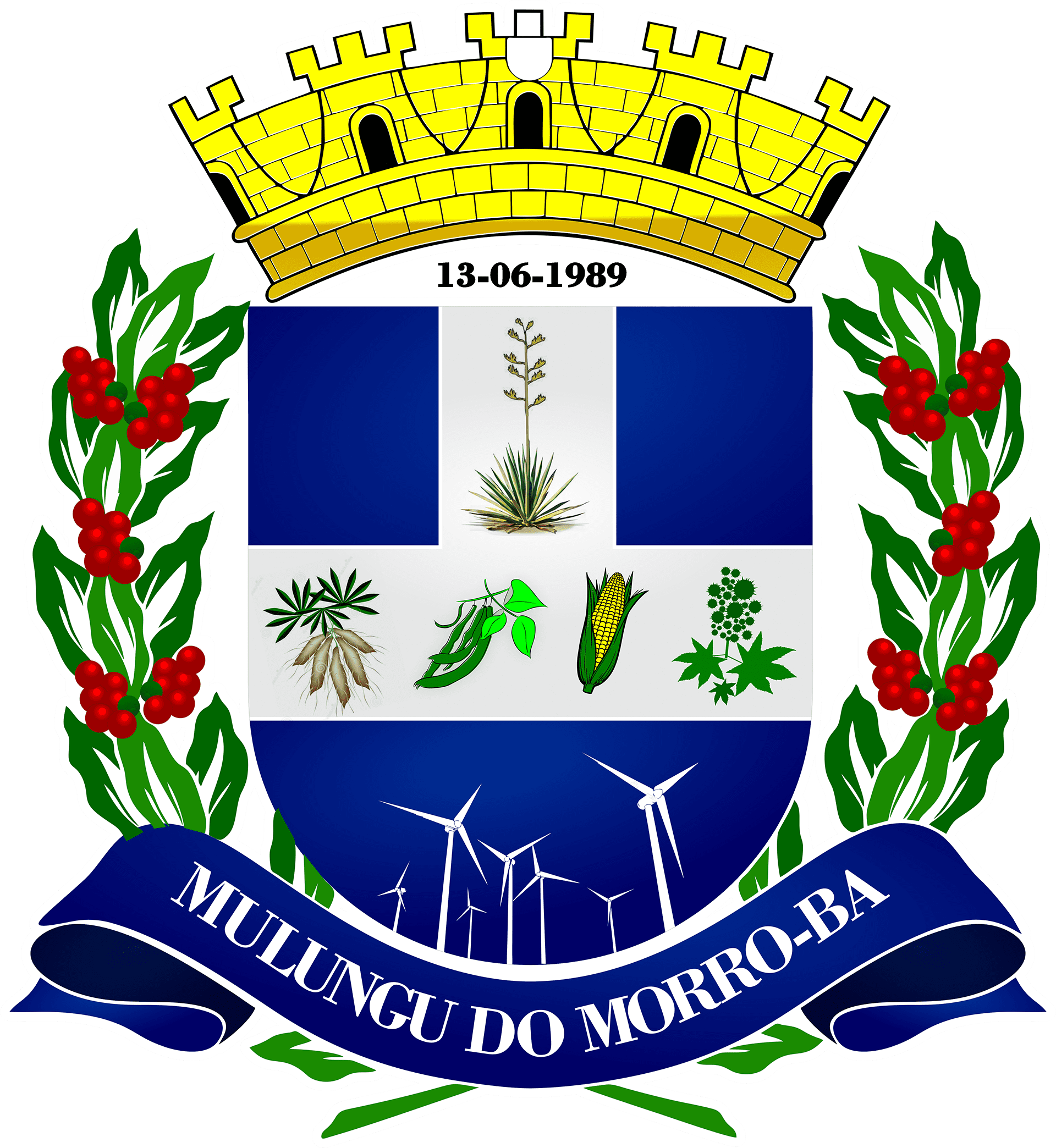
- Flag Coat of arms
- Interactive map of Mulungu do Morro
- Country: Brazil
- Region: Nordeste
- State: Bahia

Population (2020)
  - Total: 10,673
- Time zone: UTC−3 (BRT)

Mulungu do Morro is a municipality in the state of Bahia in the North-East region of Brazil. It lies at an elevation of approximately 844 meters and is home to around 13,200 residents.

== History ==
Mulungu do Morro was officially recognized as a separate municipality in the mid-20th century, having previously been part of the nearby municipality of Morro do Chapéu.

== See also ==
- List of municipalities in Bahia
