= Tremedal =

Coordinates: 14.9758°S 41.4108°W

- Municipality
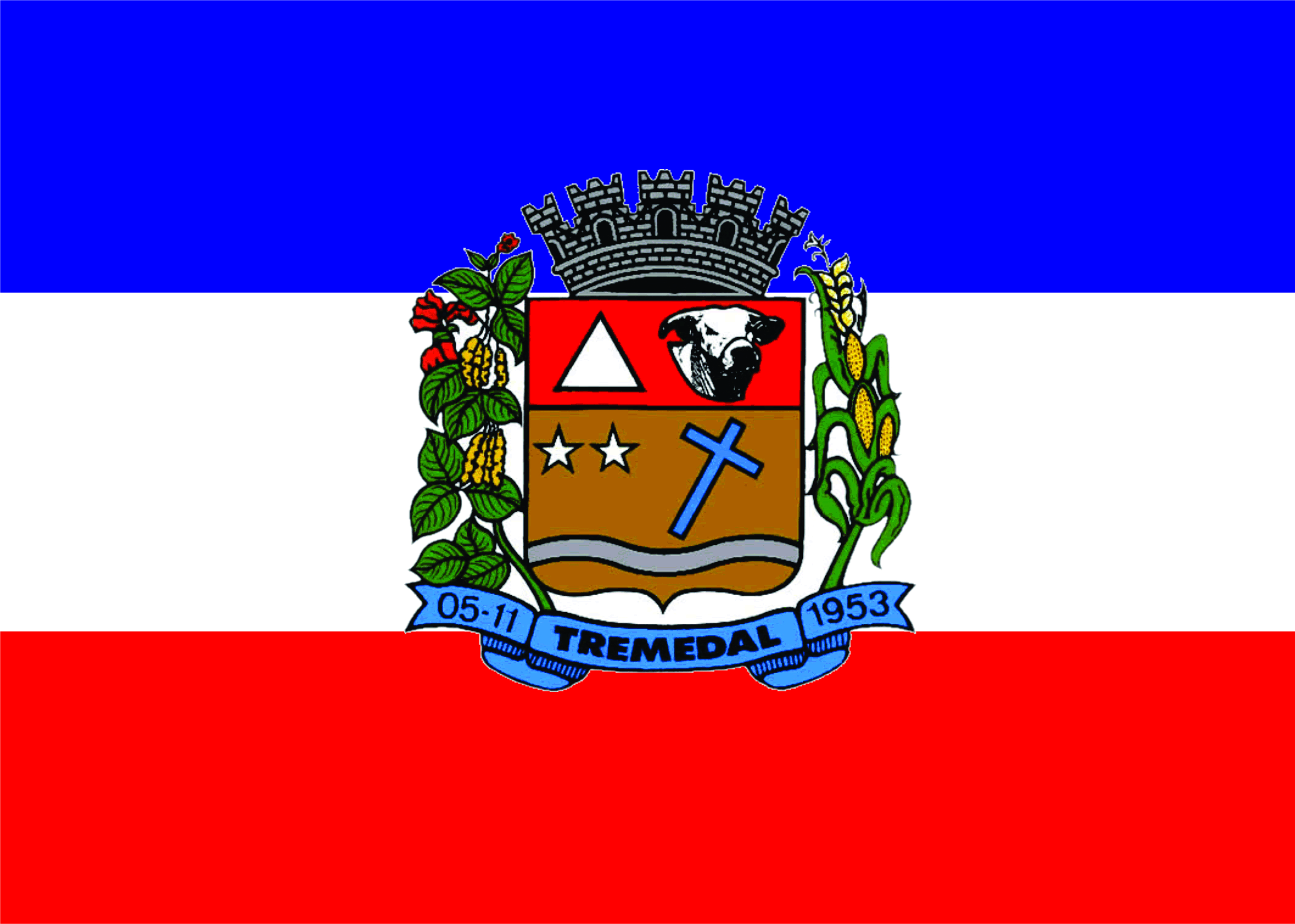
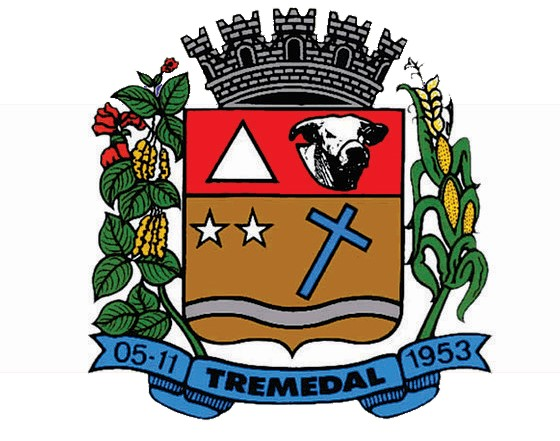
- Flag Coat of arms
- Interactive map of Tremedal
- Country: Brazil
- Region: Nordeste
- State: Bahia

Population (2020)
  - Total: 16,189
- Time zone: UTC−3 (BRT)

Tremedal is a municipality in the state of Bahia in the North-East region of Brazil.

== See also ==
- List of municipalities in Bahia
