= Macajuba =

Municipality of Bahia, Brazil

Coordinates: 12°08′09″S 40°21′36″W

- Municipality
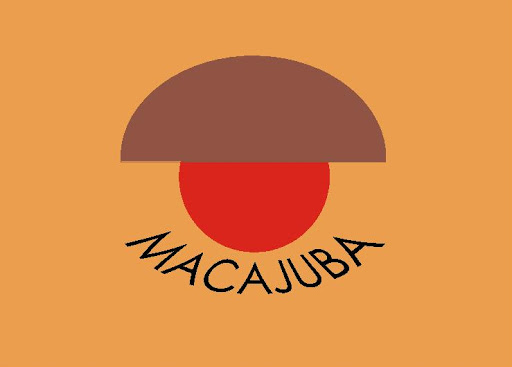
- Flag
- Interactive map of Macajuba
- Country: Brazil
- Region: Nordeste
- State: Bahia

Population (2020)
  - Total: 11,332
- Time zone: UTC−3 (BRT)

Macajuba is a municipality in the state of Bahia in the North-East region of Brazil.

== See also ==
- List of municipalities in Bahia
