= Itapé, Bahia =

Municipality of Bahia, Brazil

Coordinates: 14°53′52″S 39°25′15″W

Itapé
- Municipality
- Interactive map of Itapé
- Country: Brazil
- Region: Nordeste
- State: Bahia

Population (2020)
  - Total: 8,526
- Time zone: UTC -3

Itapé, Bahia is a municipality in the state of Bahia in the North-East region of Brazil.

== See also ==
- List of municipalities in Bahia
