= João Dourado =

Municipality of Bahia State, Brazil

Coordinates: 11°21′00″S 41°39′50″W

- Municipality
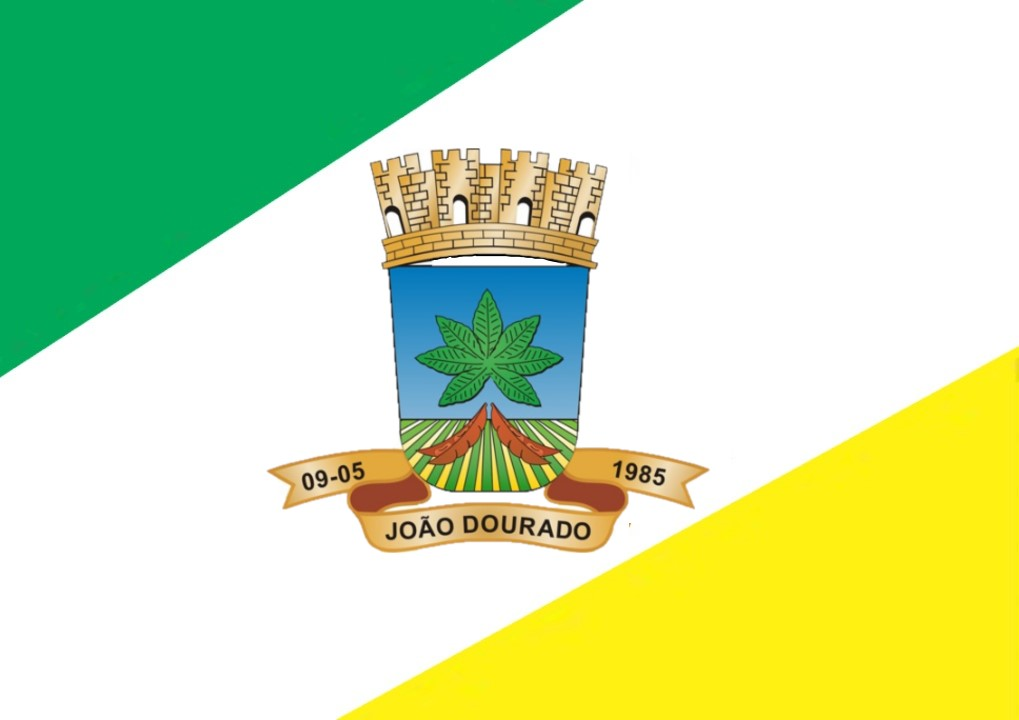
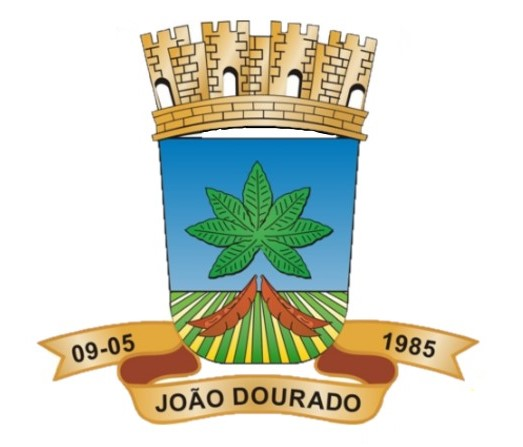
- Flag Coat of arms
- Interactive map of João Dourado
- Country: Brazil
- Region: Nordeste
- State: Bahia

Population (2020)
  - Total: 25,402
- Time zone: UTC−3 (BRT)

João Dourado is a municipality in the state of Bahia in the North-East region of Brazil.

== See also ==
- List of municipalities in Bahia
