= Lajedinho =

Municipality of Bahia, Brazil

Coordinates: 12°21′21″S 40°54′21″W

- Municipality
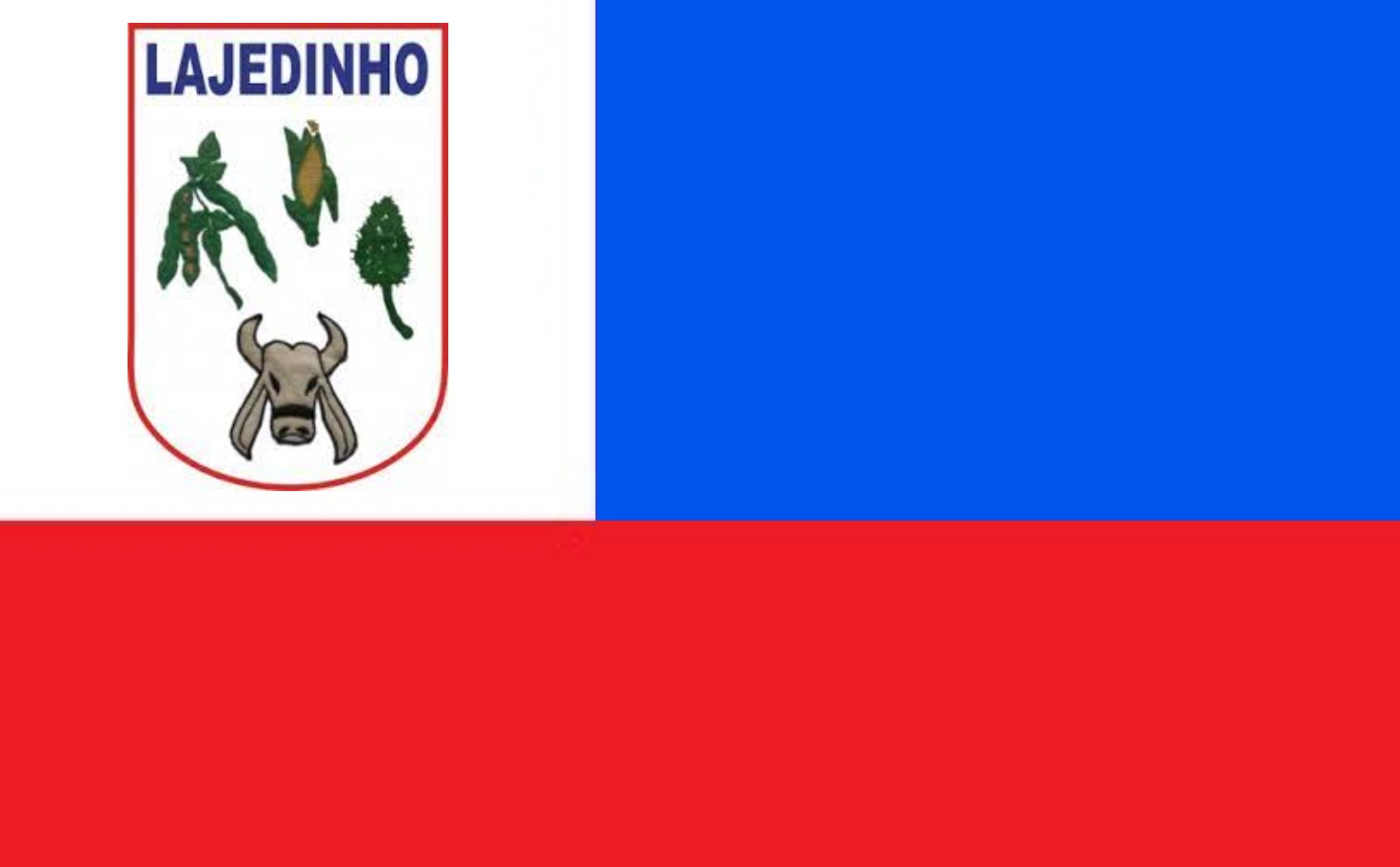
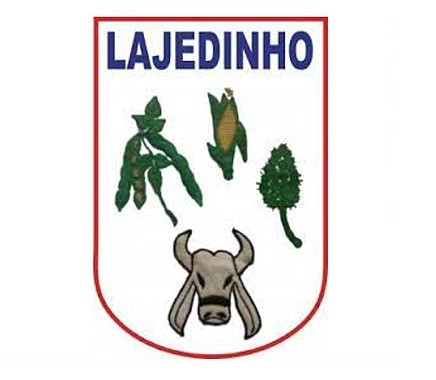
- Flag Coat of arms
- Interactive map of Lajedinho
- Country: Brazil
- Region: Nordeste
- State: Bahia

Population (2020)
  - Total: 3,758
- Time zone: UTC−3 (BRT)

Lajedinho is a municipality in the state of Bahia in the North-East region of Brazil.

== See also ==
- List of municipalities in Bahia
- Conjunto Santa Rita
