= Maiquinique =

Municipality of Bahia, Brazil

Coordinates: 15°37′S 40°15′W

- Municipality
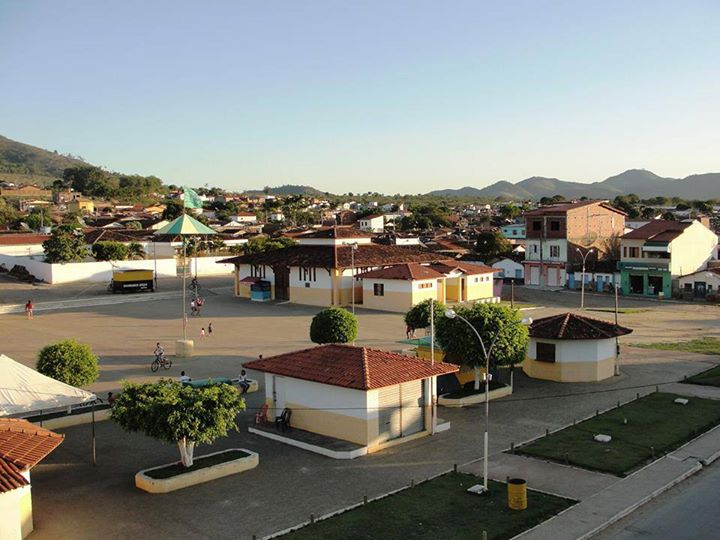
- View of Maiquinique

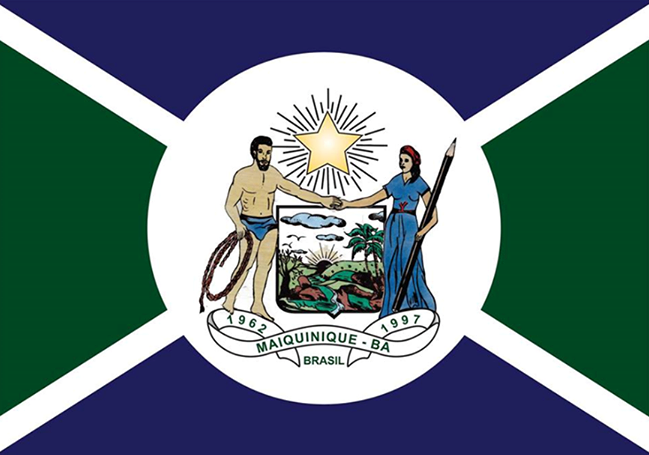
- Flag
- Interactive map of Maiquinique
- Country: Brazil
- Region: Nordeste
- State: Bahia

Population (2020)
  - Total: 10,206
- Time zone: UTC−3 (BRT)

Maiquinique is a municipality in the state of Bahia in the North-East region of Brazil.

== See also ==
- List of municipalities in Bahia
