= Vereda, Bahia =

Coordinates: 17°13′22″S 40°05′24″W

Vereda
- Municipality
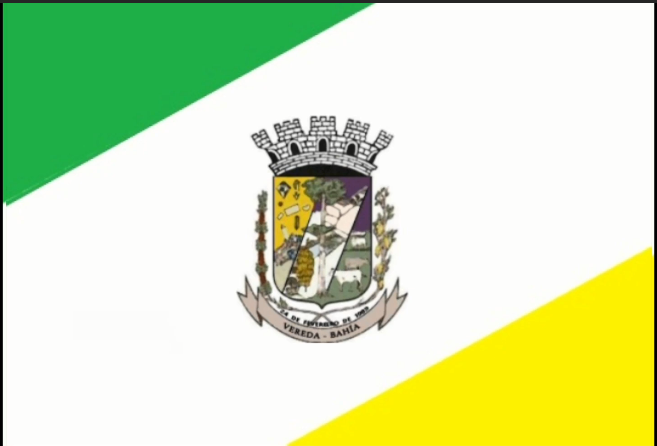
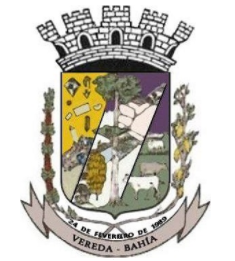
- Flag Coat of arms
- Interactive map of Vereda
- Country: Brazil
- Region: Nordeste
- State: Bahia

Population (2020)
  - Total: 6,153
- Time zone: UTC−3 (BRT)

Vereda, Bahia is a municipality in the state of Bahia in the North-East region of Brazil.

== See also ==
- List of municipalities in Bahia
