= Brejões =

Municipality of Bahia, Brazil

- Municipality
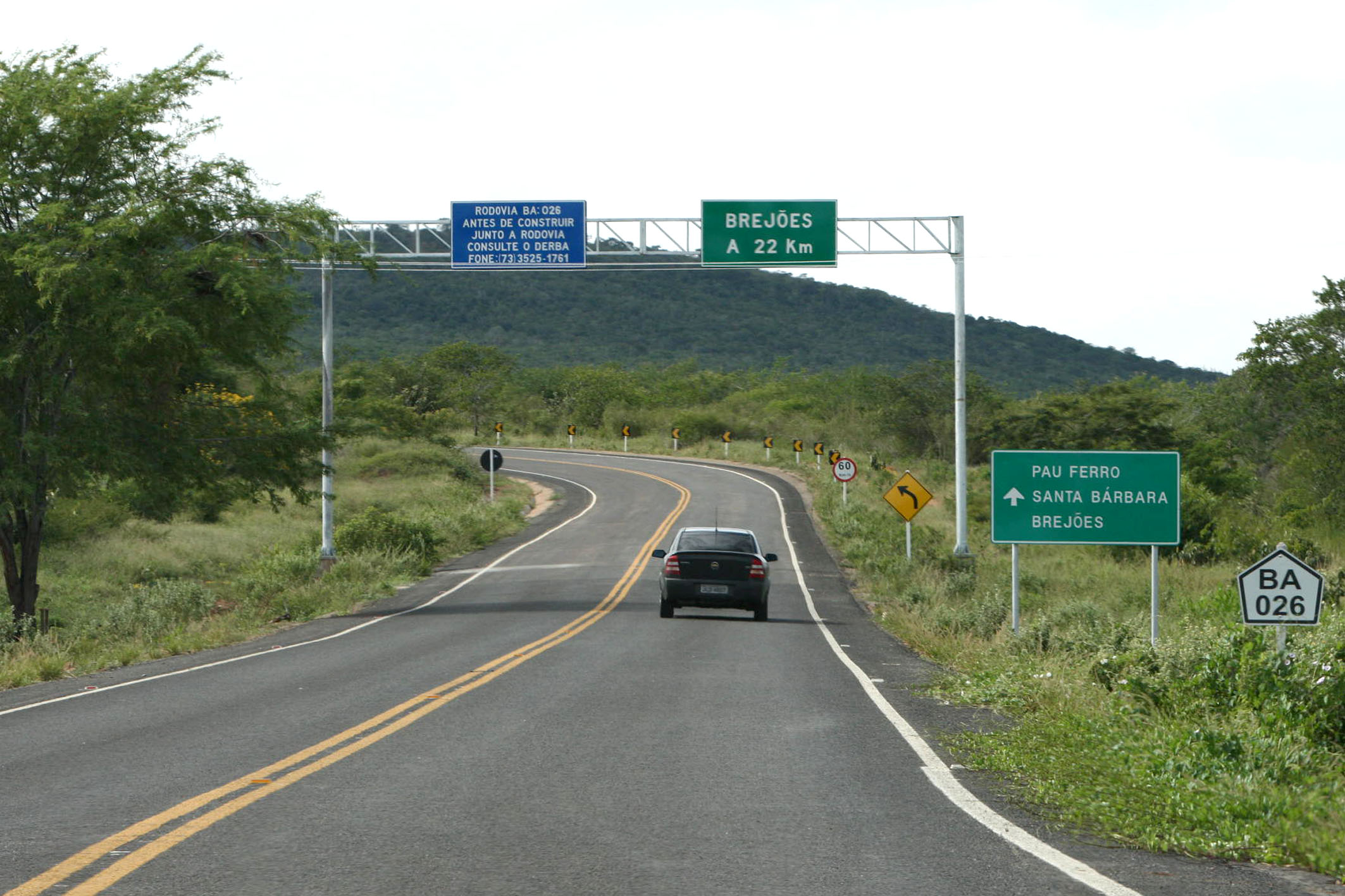

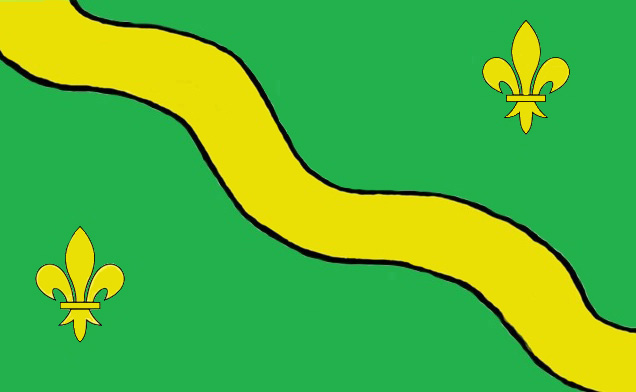
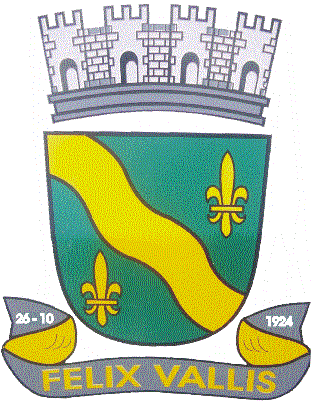
- Flag Coat of arms

- Location in Brazil
- Coordinates: 13°06′14″S 39°47′45″W
- Country: Brazil
- Region: Nordeste
- State: Bahia

Area
  - Total: 518.566 km^{2} (200.219 sq mi)
- Elevation: 611 m (2,005 ft)

Population (2020)
  - Total: 14,222
  - Density: 27.426/km^{2} (71.032/sq mi)
- Time zone: UTC−3 (BRT)

Brejões is a municipality in the state of Bahia in the North-East region of Brazil.

== See also ==
- List of municipalities in Bahia
