= Itamari =

Municipality of Bahia, Brazil

Coordinates: 13°47′S 39°37′W

- Municipality
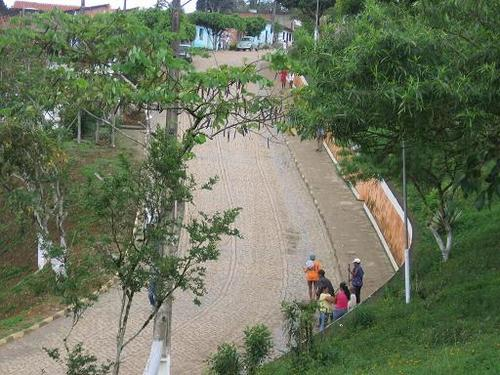

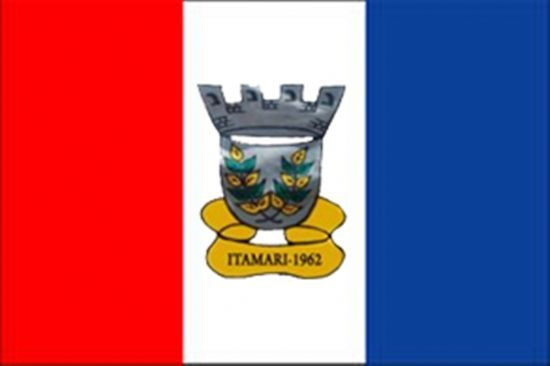
- Flag Coat of arms
- Interactive map of Itamari
- Country: Brazil
- Region: Nordeste
- State: Bahia

Population (2020)
  - Total: 8,003
- Time zone: UTC−3 (BRT)

Itamari is a municipality in the state of Bahia in the North-East region of Brazil.

== See also ==
- List of municipalities in Bahia
