= Morpará =

Municipality of Bahia, Brazil

Morpará Município de Morpará
- Municipality
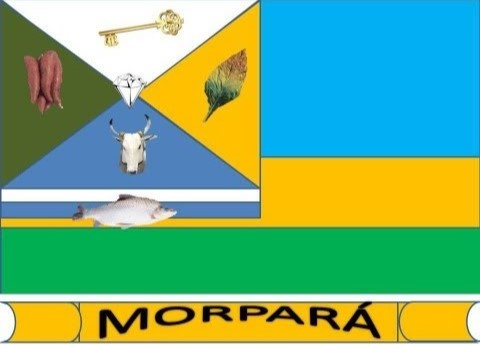
- Flag Coat of arms

- Location of Morpará in Bahia

- Location of Morpará in the Brazil
- Coordinates: 11°33′32″S 43°16′51″W
- Country: Brazil
- Region: Northeast
- State: Bahia
- Founded: 1812

Government
  - Mayor: Edinalva Pereira de Almeida (Nalva)

Area
  - Total: 2.090926 km^{2} (0.807311 sq mi)

Population (2020)
  - Total: 8,497
  - Density: 4,066/km^{2} (10,530/sq mi)
- Demonym: Morparaense
- Time zone: UTC−3 (BRT)
- Website: morpara.ba.gov.br

Morpará is a municipality in the state of Bahia in the North-East region of Brazil. Morpará covers 2.090926 km^{2} (0.807311 mi^{2}), and has a population of 8,497 with a population density of 1.28 inhabitants per square kilometer.

== History ==
Historically, Morpará developed as a small rural settlement in the interior of Bahia, and over time became a local center for agriculture and livestock. Its economy is primarily based on farming, cattle raising, and small-scale commerce that serves the surrounding rural communities. Despite its small size, the town has basic educational and healthcare facilities and functions as an important support hub for nearby villages.

== See also ==
- List of municipalities in Bahia
