= Itagimirim =

Municipality of Bahia, Brazil

Coordinates: 16°05′13″S 39°36′50″W

- Municipality
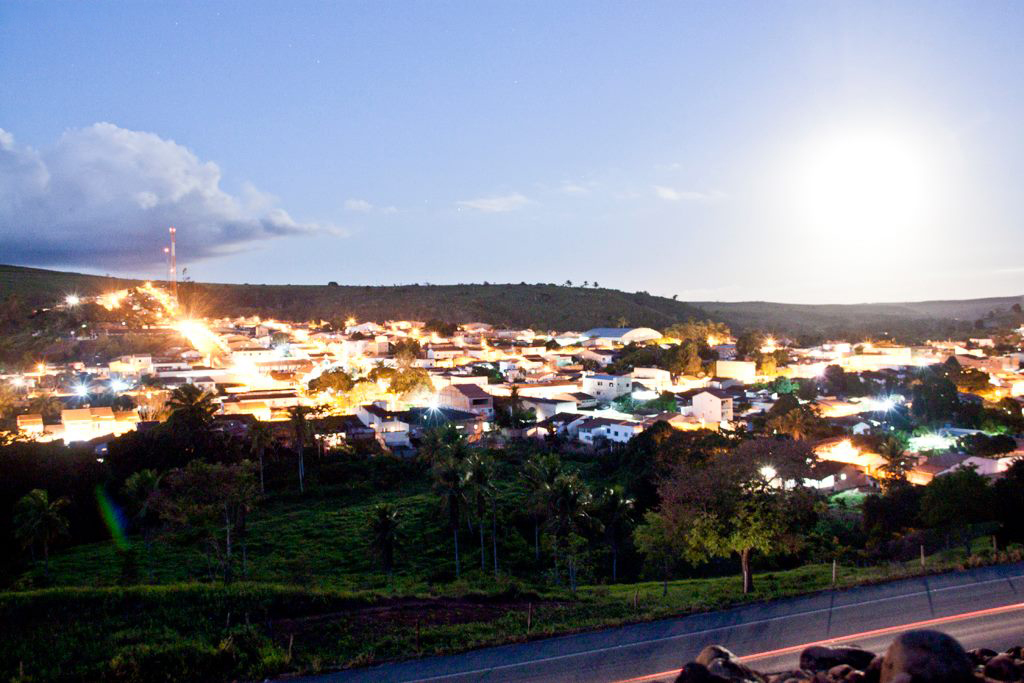
- View of Itagimirim

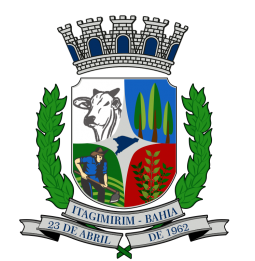
- Flag Coat of arms
- Interactive map of Itagimirim
- Country: Brazil
- Region: Nordeste
- State: Bahia

Population (2020)
  - Total: 6,825
- Time zone: UTC−3 (BRT)

Itagimirim is a municipality in the state of Bahia in the North-East region of Brazil.

== See also ==
- List of municipalities in Bahia
