= Érico Cardoso =

Municipality of Bahia, Brazil

Coordinates: 13°25′04″S 42°08′24″W

- Municipality
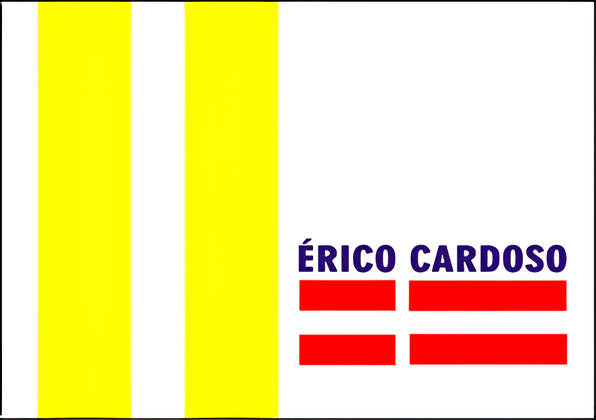
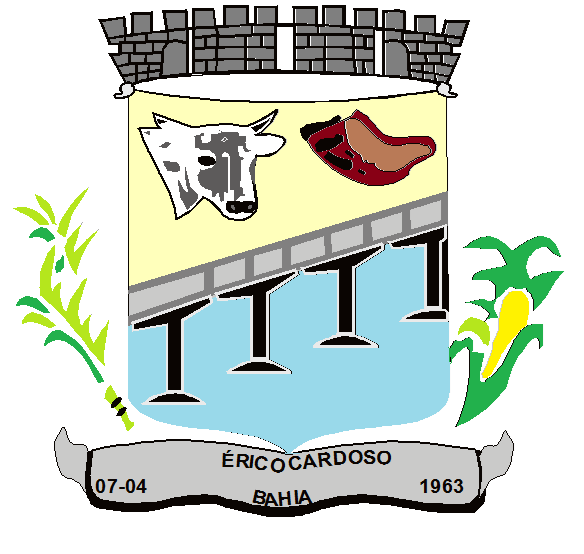
- Flag Coat of arms
- Interactive map of Érico Cardoso
- Country: Brazil
- Region: Nordeste
- State: Bahia

Population (2020)
  - Total: 10,560
- Time zone: UTC−3 (BRT)

Érico Cardoso is a municipality in the state of Bahia in the North-East region of Brazil.

== See also ==
- List of municipalities in Bahia
