= Jacaraci =

Municipality of Bahia, Brazil

Coordinates: 14°51′S 42°26′W

- Municipality
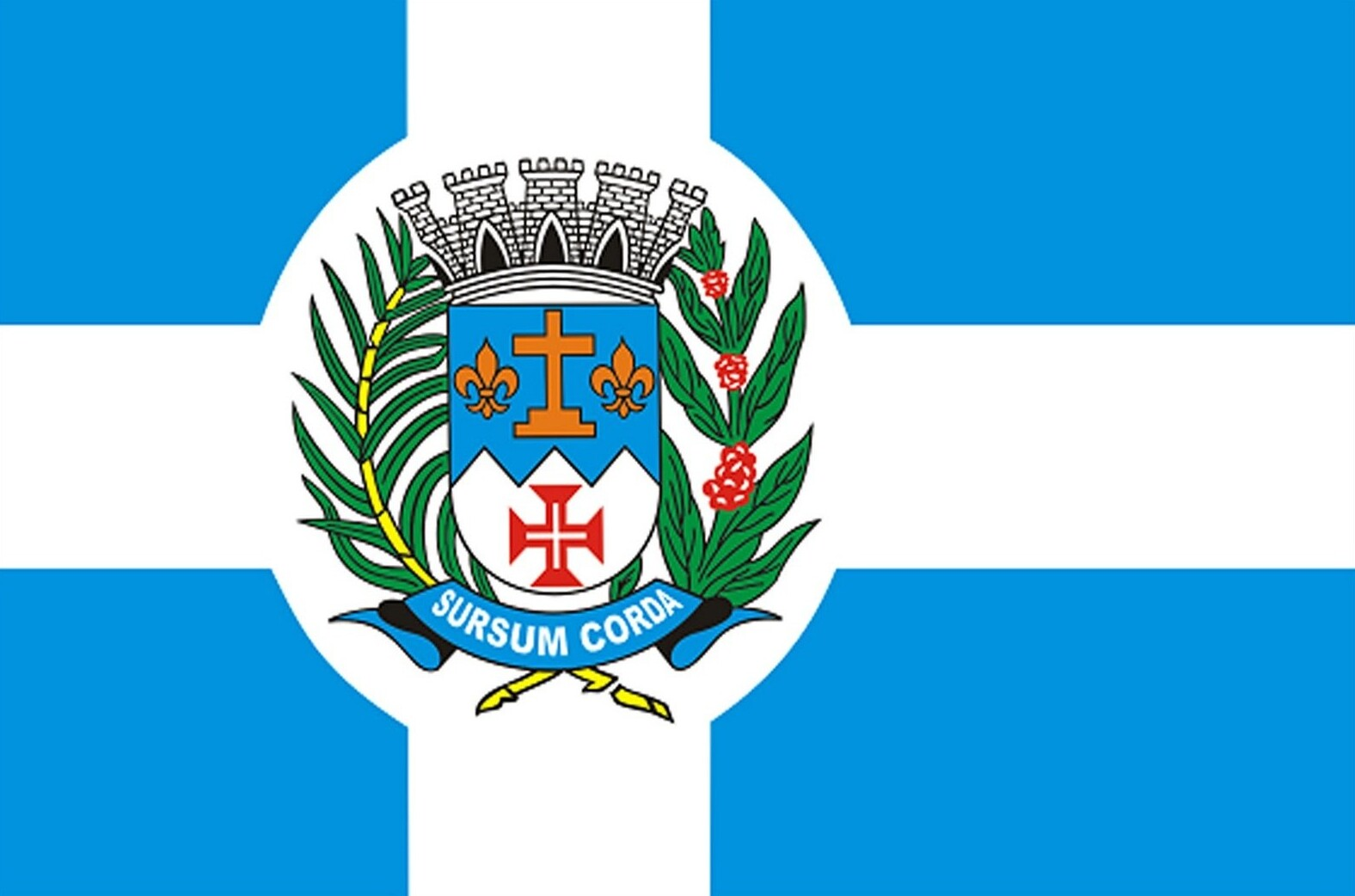
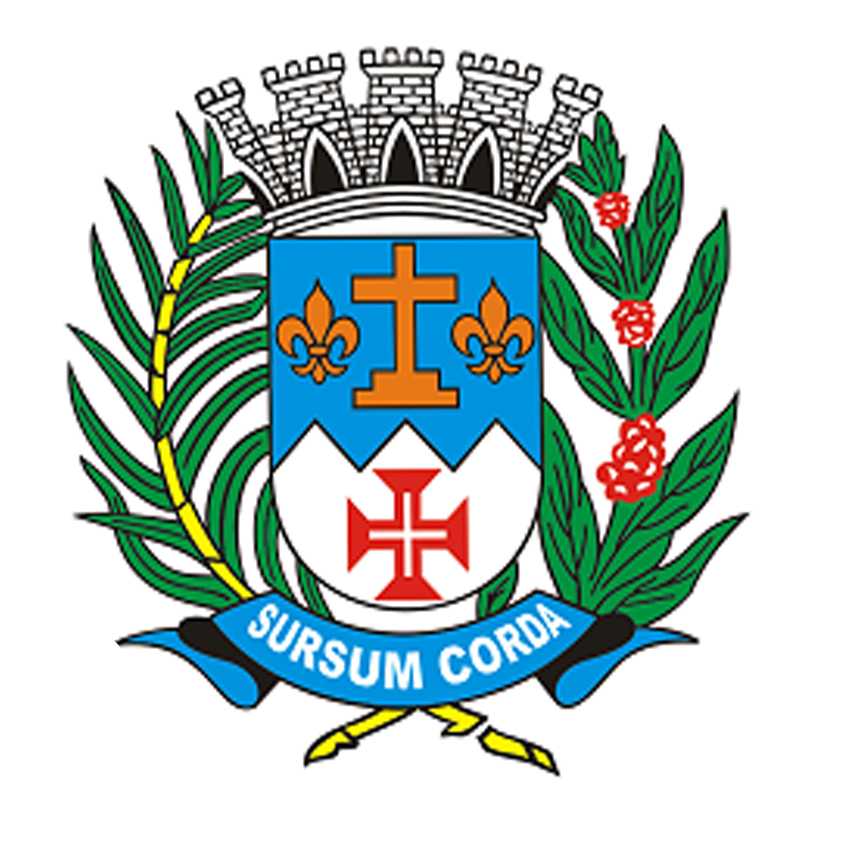
- Flag Coat of arms
- Interactive map of Jacaraci
- Country: Brazil
- Region: Nordeste
- State: Bahia

Population (2020)
  - Total: 14,850
- Time zone: UTC−3 (BRT)

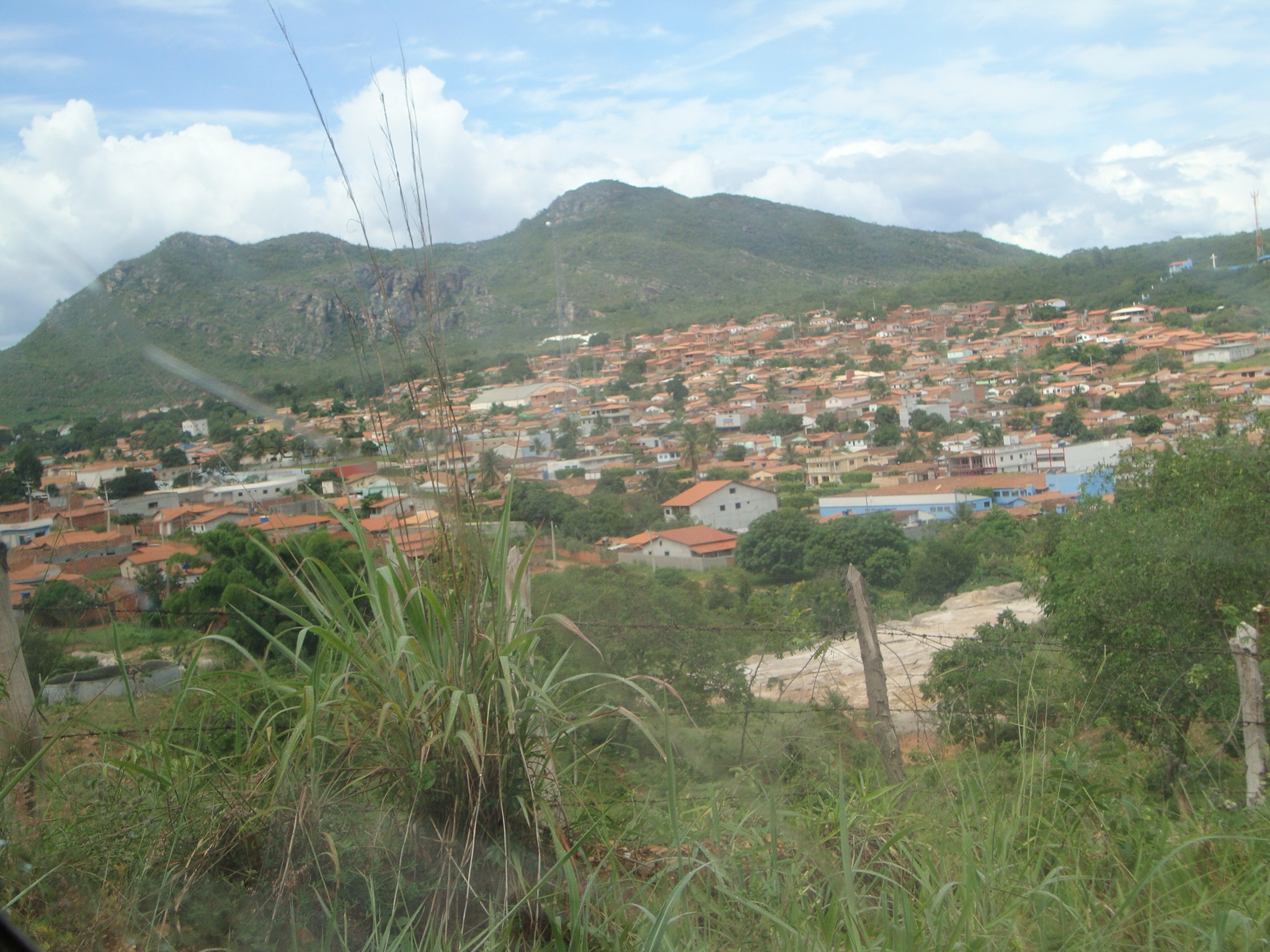
Overview of the municipality of Jacaraci in the state of Bahia, Brazil

Jacaraci is a municipality in the state of Bahia in the Northeast region of Brazil.

== See also ==
- List of municipalities in Bahia
