= Rafael Jambeiro =

Municipality of Bahia State, Brazil

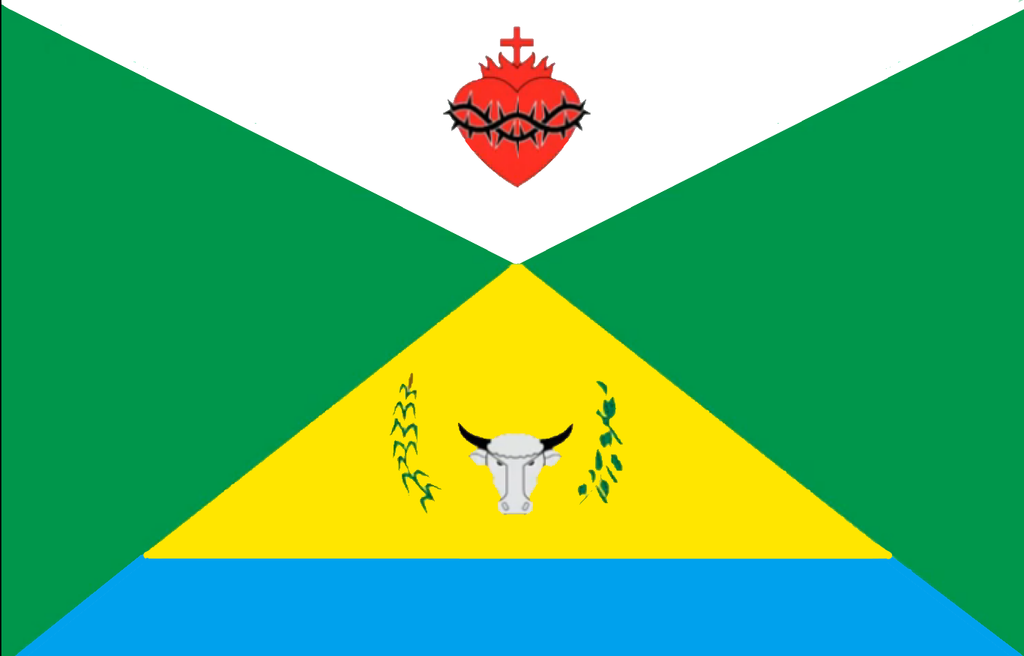
- Flag Coat of arms

- Coordinates: 12°24′38″S 39°30′03″W
- Region: Nordeste
- State: Bahia
- Founded: 20 July 1962

Population (2020)
  - Total: 22,633
- Time zone: UTC−3 (BRT)
- Postal code: 2925956

Rafael Jambeiro is a municipality in the state of Bahia in the North-East region of Brazil.

== See also ==
- List of municipalities in Bahia
