= Ouriçangas =

Municipality of Bahia State, Brazil

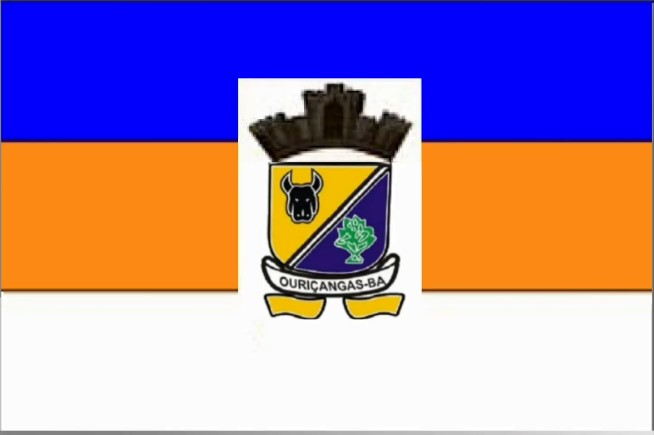
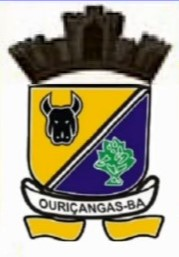
- Flag Coat of arms

- Coordinates: 12°01′01″S 38°37′01″W
- Region: Northeast
- State: Bahia
- Founded: 20 July 1962

Population (2022)
  - Total: 7,716
- Time zone: UTC−3 (BRT)
- Postal code: 2923308

Ouriçangas is a municipality in the state of Bahia in the Northeast region of Brazil.

== See also ==
- List of municipalities in Bahia
