= Apuarema =

Municipality of Bahia, Brazil

- Municipality
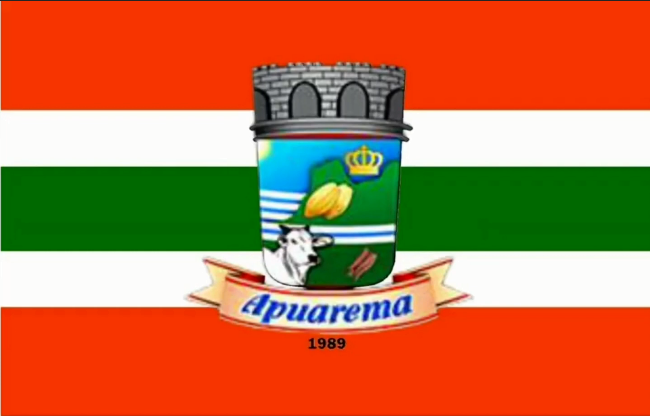
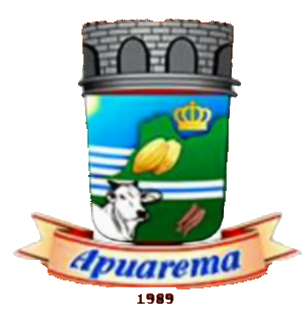
- Flag Coat of arms

- Within the state of Bahía
- Coordinates: 13°51′21″S 39°44′38″W
- Country: Brazil
- Region: Nordeste
- State: Bahia
- Established: 13/06/1989

Government
  - Prefect: Raimundo Pinheiro de Oliveira
- Elevation: 912 ft (278 m)

Population (2020)
  - Total: 7,302
- Time zone: UTC−3 (BRT)

Apuarema is a municipality in the state of Bahia in the North-East region of Brazil. Its population in 2020 was 7,302 inhabitants.

== See also ==
- List of municipalities in Bahia
