= Caetanos =

Municipality of Bahia, Brazil

- Municipality
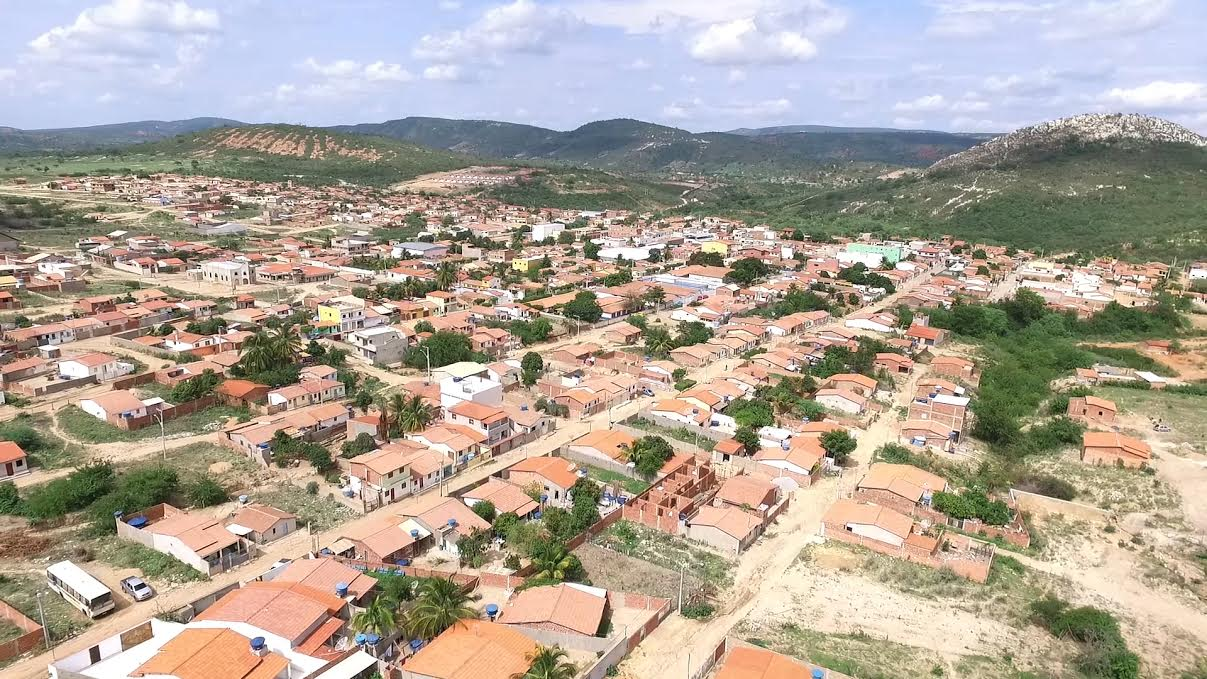
- View of Caetanos

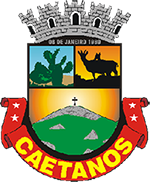
- Coat of arms

- Location in Brazil
- Coordinates: 14°20′16″S 40°54′36″W
- Country: Brazil
- Region: Nordeste
- State: Bahia

Population (2020)
  - Total: 14,608
- Time zone: UTC−3 (BRT)

Caetanos is a municipality in the state of Bahia in the North-East region of Brazil.

== See also ==
- List of municipalities in Bahia
