= Pedrão =

Municipality of Bahia State, Brazil

- Flag Coat of arms

- Coordinates: 12°09′00″S 38°39′00″W
- Region: Nordeste
- State: Bahia
- Founded: 20 July 1962

Population (2020)
  - Total: 7,394
- Time zone: UTC−3 (BRT)
- Postal code: 2924108

Pedrão is a municipality in the state of Bahia in the North-East region of Brazil.

== See also ==
- List of municipalities in Bahia
