= Itanagra =

Municipality of Bahia, Brazil

Coordinates: 12°16′S 38°03′W

- Municipality
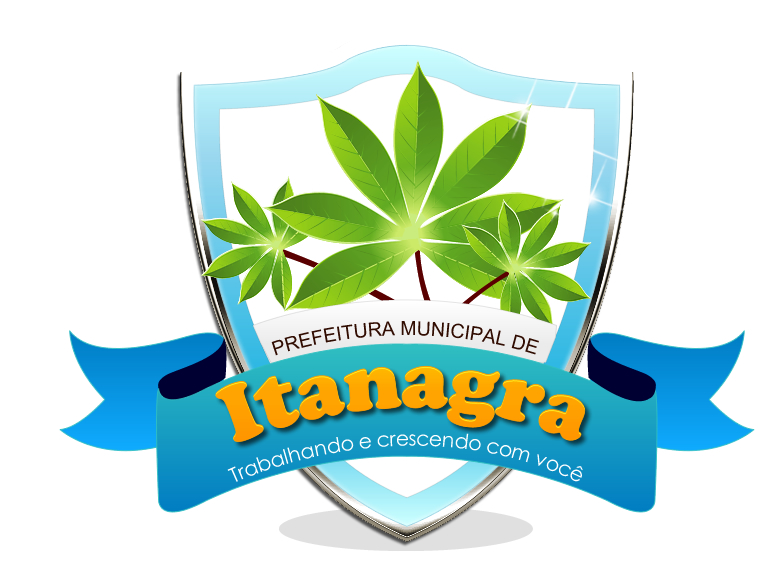
- Flag Coat of arms
- Interactive map of Itanagra
- Country: Brazil
- Region: Nordeste
- State: Bahia

Government
  - Mayor: Valdir Jesus de Souza (PSB)
  - Deputy Mayor: Edileusa Laudano (PMDB)

Population (2020)
  - Total: 6,436
- Time zone: UTC−3 (BRT)

Itanagra is a municipality in the state of Bahia in the North-East region of Brazil.

== See also ==
- List of municipalities in Bahia
