= América Dourada =

Municipality of Bahia State, Brazil

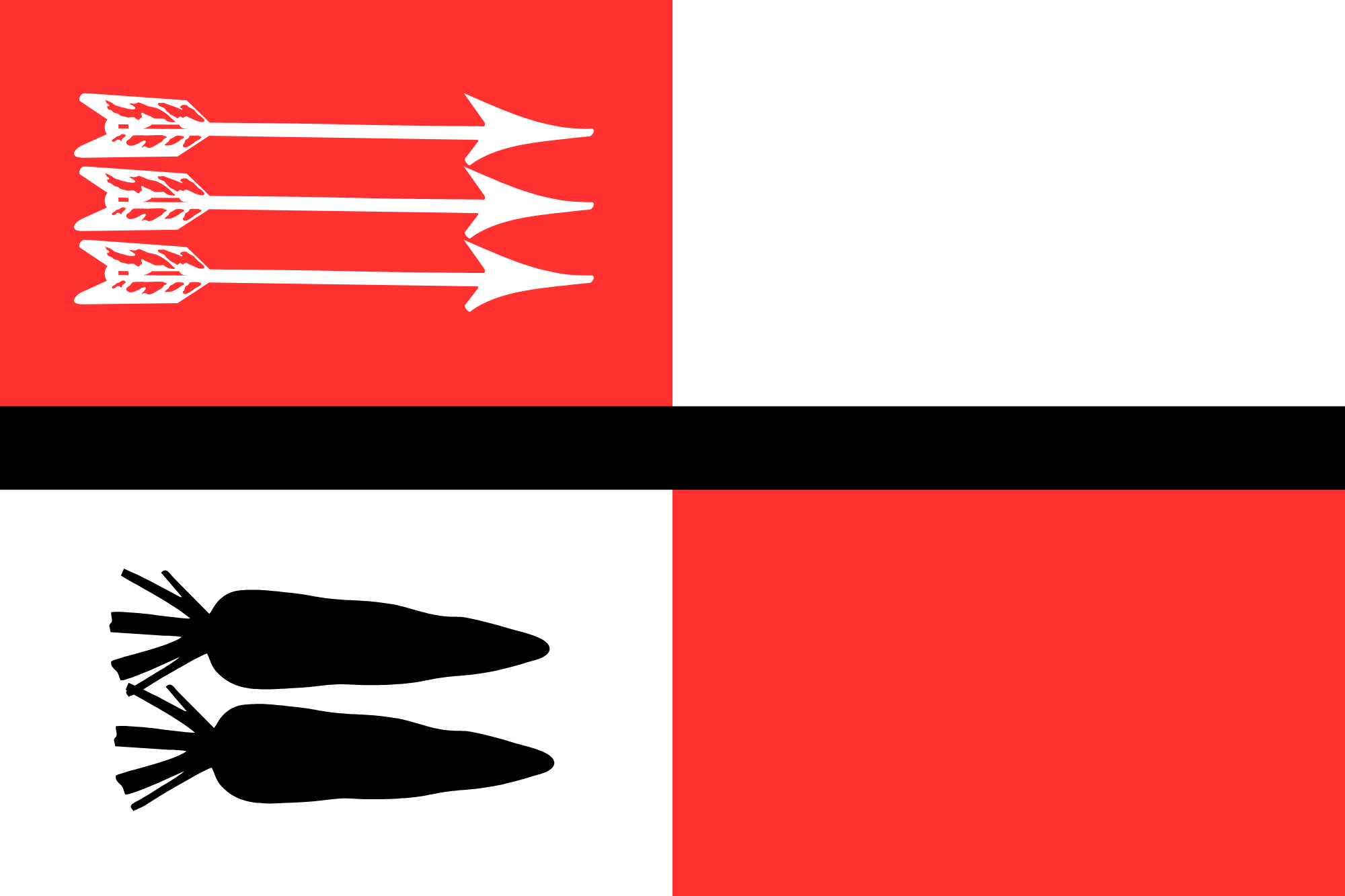
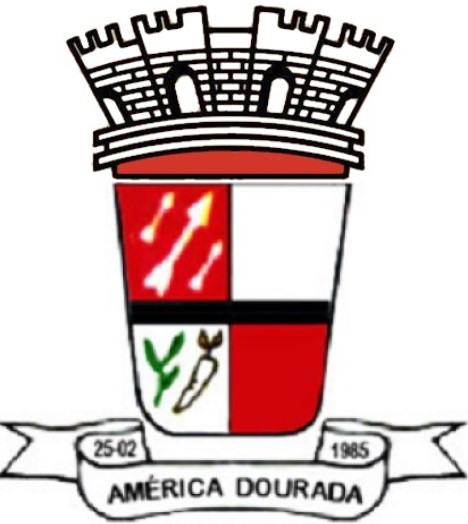
- Flag Coat of arms

- Coordinates: 11°27′18″S 41°26′09″W
- Country: Brazil
- Region: Nordeste
- State: Bahia
- Founded: 12 July 1921
- Elevation: 121 m (397 ft)

Population (2020)
  - Total: 16,090
- Time zone: UTC−3 (BRT)
- Postal code: 2901155

América Dourada is a municipality in the state of Bahia in the North-East region of Brazil.

== See also ==
- List of municipalities in Bahia
