= Palmas de Monte Alto =

Municipality of Bahia, Brazil

Coordinates: 14°16′S 43°10′W

- Municipality
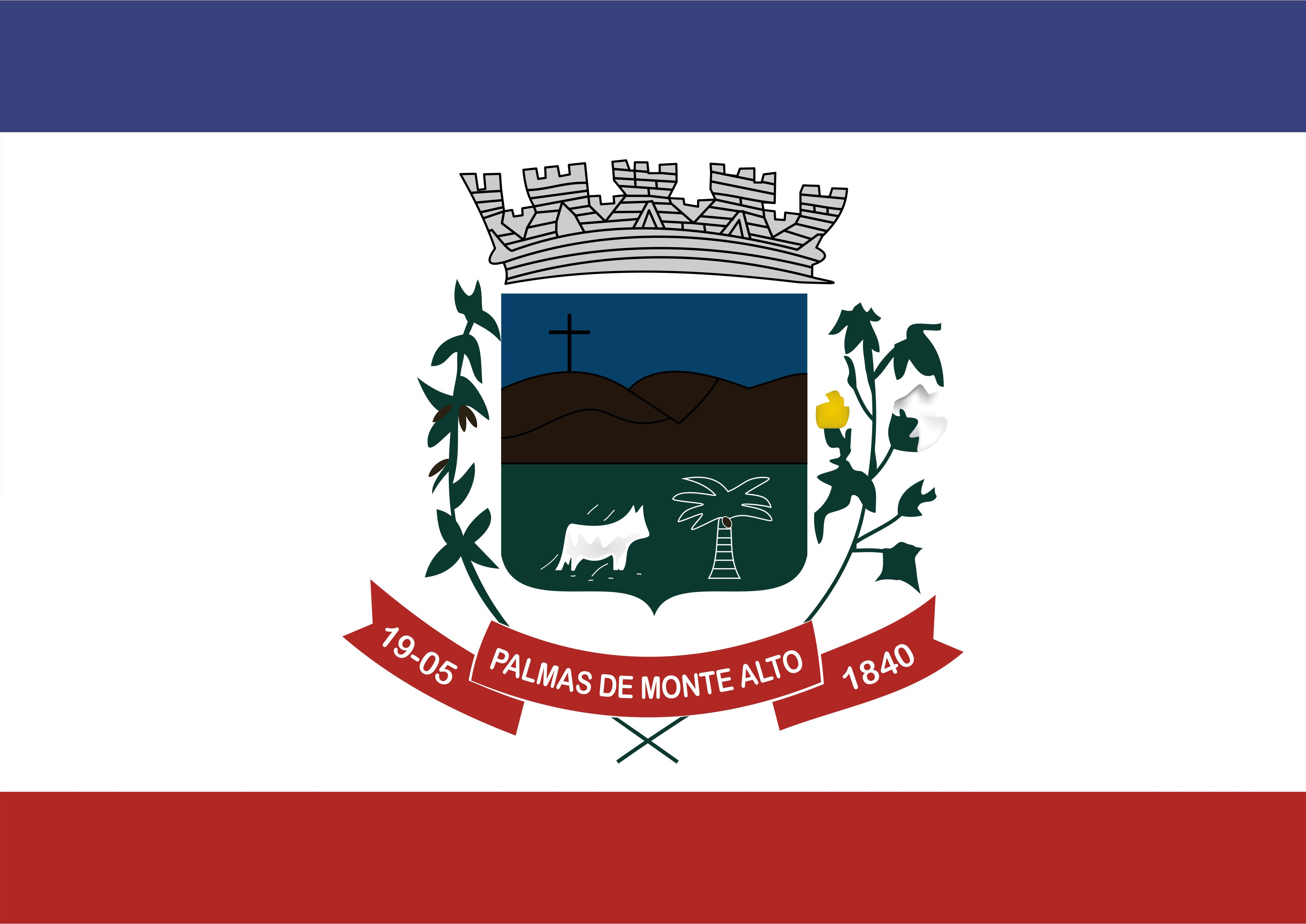
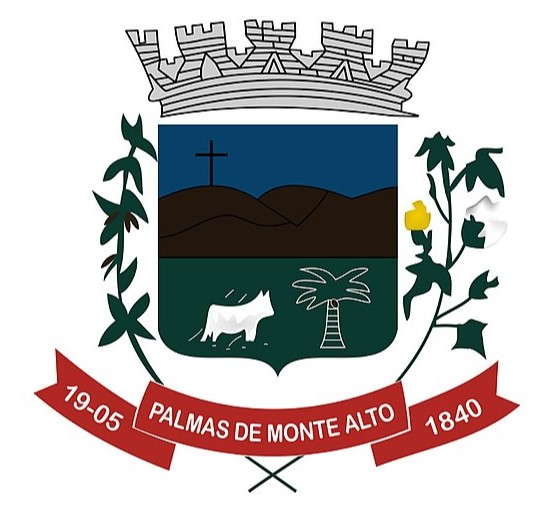
- Flag Coat of arms
- Interactive map of Palmas de Monte Alto
- Country: Brazil
- Region: Nordeste
- State: Bahia

Population (2020)
  - Total: 21,796
- Time zone: UTC−3 (BRT)

Palmas de Monte Alto is a municipality in the state of Bahia in the North-East region of Brazil.

== See also ==
- List of municipalities in Bahia
