= Itaguaçu da Bahia =

Municipality of Bahia, Brazil

Itaguaçu da Bahia Município de Itaguaçu da Bahia
- Municipality
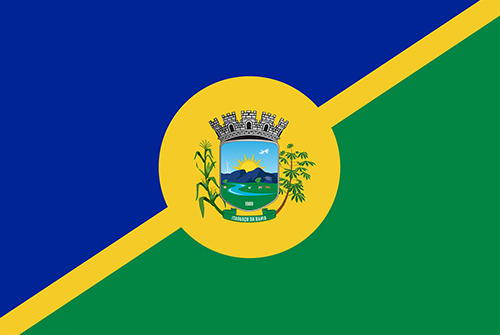
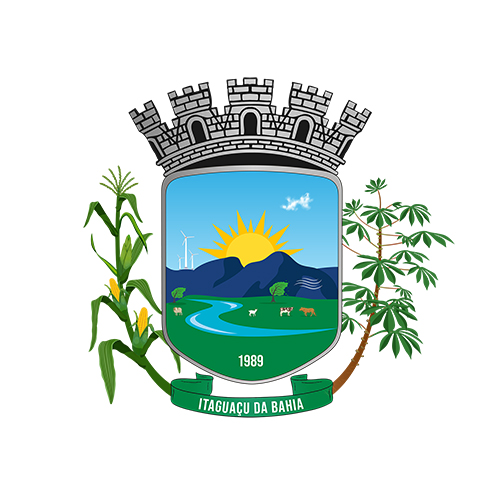
- Flag Coat of arms

- Location of Itaguaçu da Bahia in Bahia

- Location of Itaguaçu da Bahia in the Brazil
- Coordinates: 11°00′43″S 42°23′56″W
- Country: Brazil
- Region: Northeast
- State: Bahia
- Founded: February 24, 1989

Government
  - Mayor: Adão Alves de Carvalho Filho (PMN, 2013-2016)

Area
  - Total: 4,451.270 km^{2} (1,718.645 sq mi)

Population (2020)
  - Total: 14,542
  - Density: 3.2669/km^{2} (8.4613/sq mi)
- Demonym: itaguaçuense
- Time zone: UTC−3 (BRT)

Itaguaçu da Bahia is a municipality in the state of Bahia in the North-East region of Brazil. It covers 4,451.270 km^{2} (1,718.645 mi^{2}), and has a population of 14,542 with a population density of 3.3 inhabitants per square kilometer.

== See also ==
- List of municipalities in Bahia
