= Capela do Alto Alegre =

Municipality of Bahia, Brazil

- Municipality
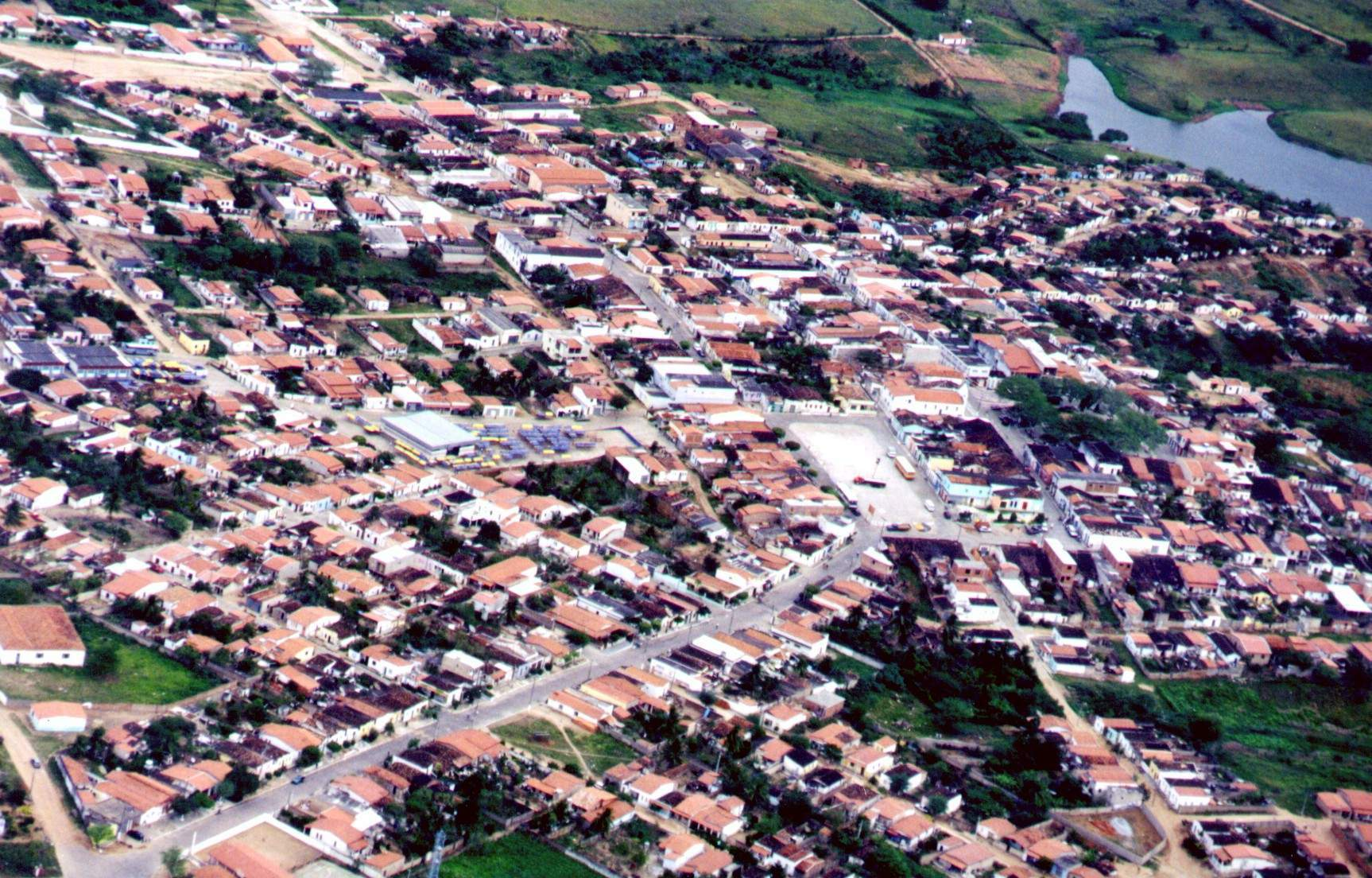
- View of Capela do Alto Alegre

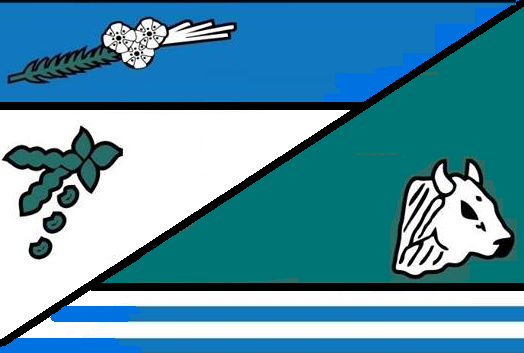
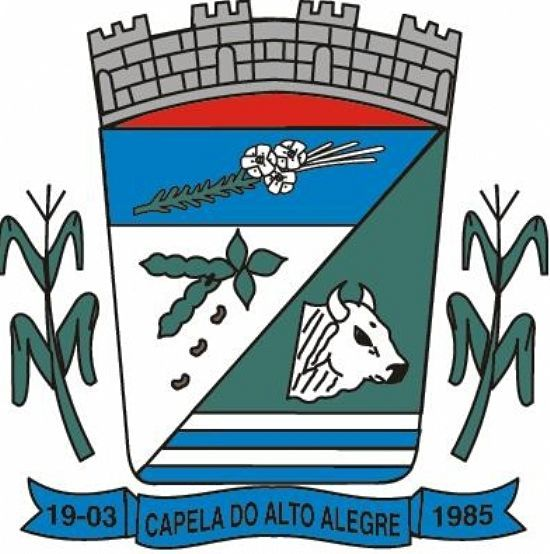
- Flag Coat of arms

- Location in Brazil
- Coordinates: 11°40′S 39°51′W
- Country: Brazil
- Region: Nordeste
- State: Bahia

Population (2020)
  - Total: 11,616
- Time zone: UTC−3 (BRT)

Capela do Alto Alegre is a municipality in the state of Bahia in the North-East region of Brazil.

== See also ==
- List of municipalities in Bahia
