= Saúde, Bahia =

Coordinates: 10°56′27″S 40°25′04″W

Saúde
- Municipality
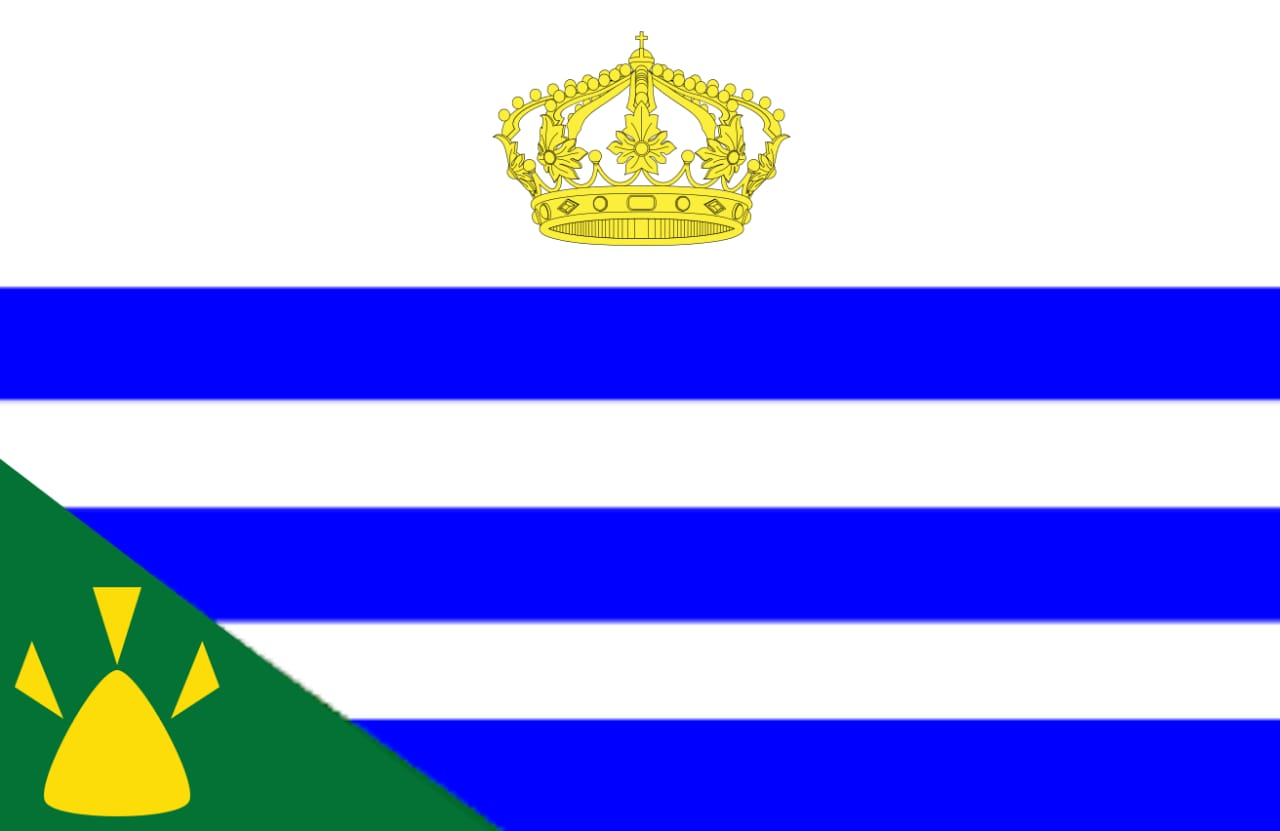
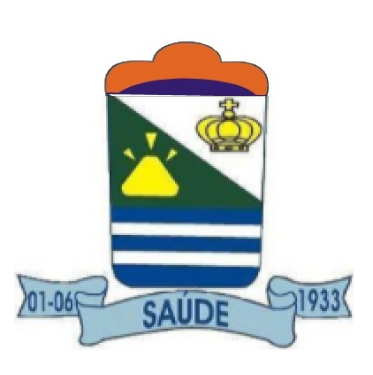
- Flag Coat of arms

- Country: Brazil
- Region: Nordeste
- State: Bahia

Area
  - Total: 196.564 sq mi (509.098 km^{2})

Population (2020)
  - Total: 12,943
  - Density: 60.8/sq mi (23.49/km^{2})
- Time zone: UTC−3 (BRT)

Saúde is a municipality in the state of Bahia in the North-East region of Brazil. Its population estimated in 2020 is 12,943.

== See also ==
- List of municipalities in Bahia
