= List of municipalities in Bahia =

This is a list of the municipalities in the state of Bahia (BA), located in the Northeast Region of Brazil. Bahia is divided into 417 municipalities, which were, until 2017, grouped into 32 microregions, which were grouped into 7 mesoregions.

Municipalities of Bahia, Brazil

Mesoregion	Microregion	Municipality
Centro Norte Baiano	Feira de Santana	Água Fria
Centro Norte Baiano	Feira de Santana	Amélia Rodrigues
Centro Norte Baiano	Feira de Santana	Anguera
Centro Norte Baiano	Feira de Santana	Antônio Cardoso
Centro Norte Baiano	Feira de Santana	Conceição da Feira
Centro Norte Baiano	Feira de Santana	Coração de Maria
Centro Norte Baiano	Feira de Santana	Elísio Medrado
Centro Norte Baiano	Feira de Santana	Feira de Santana
Centro Norte Baiano	Feira de Santana	Ipecaetá
Centro Norte Baiano	Feira de Santana	Ipirá
Centro Norte Baiano	Feira de Santana	Irará
Centro Norte Baiano	Feira de Santana	Itatim
Centro Norte Baiano	Feira de Santana	Ouriçangas
Centro Norte Baiano	Feira de Santana	Pedrão
Centro Norte Baiano	Feira de Santana	Pintadas
Centro Norte Baiano	Feira de Santana	Rafael Jambeiro
Centro Norte Baiano	Feira de Santana	Santa Bárbara
Centro Norte Baiano	Feira de Santana	Santa Teresinha
Centro Norte Baiano	Feira de Santana	Santanópolis
Centro Norte Baiano	Feira de Santana	Santo Estêvão
Centro Norte Baiano	Feira de Santana	São Gonçalo dos Campos
Centro Norte Baiano	Feira de Santana	Serra Preta
Centro Norte Baiano	Feira de Santana	Tanquinho
Centro Norte Baiano	Feira de Santana	Teodoro Sampaio
Centro Norte Baiano	Irecê	América Dourada
Centro Norte Baiano	Irecê	Barra do Mendes
Centro Norte Baiano	Irecê	Barro Alto
Centro Norte Baiano	Irecê	Cafarnaum
Centro Norte Baiano	Irecê	Canarana
Centro Norte Baiano	Irecê	Central
Centro Norte Baiano	Irecê	Gentio do Ouro
Centro Norte Baiano	Irecê	Ibipeba
Centro Norte Baiano	Irecê	Ibititá
Centro Norte Baiano	Irecê	Iraquara
Centro Norte Baiano	Irecê	Irecê
Centro Norte Baiano	Irecê	João Dourado
Centro Norte Baiano	Irecê	Jussara
Centro Norte Baiano	Irecê	Lapão
Centro Norte Baiano	Irecê	Mulungu do Morro
Centro Norte Baiano	Irecê	Presidente Dutra
Centro Norte Baiano	Irecê	São Gabriel
Centro Norte Baiano	Irecê	Souto Soares
Centro Norte Baiano	Irecê	Uibaí
Centro Norte Baiano	Itaberaba	Baixa Grande
Centro Norte Baiano	Itaberaba	Boa Vista do Tupim
Centro Norte Baiano	Itaberaba	Iaçu
Centro Norte Baiano	Itaberaba	Ibiquera
Centro Norte Baiano	Itaberaba	Itaberaba
Centro Norte Baiano	Itaberaba	Lajedinho
Centro Norte Baiano	Itaberaba	Macajuba
Centro Norte Baiano	Itaberaba	Mairi
Centro Norte Baiano	Itaberaba	Mundo Novo
Centro Norte Baiano	Itaberaba	Ruy Barbosa, Bahia
Centro Norte Baiano	Itaberaba	Tapiramutá
Centro Norte Baiano	Itaberaba	Várzea da Roça
Centro Norte Baiano	Jacobina	Caém
Centro Norte Baiano	Jacobina	Caldeirão Grande
Centro Norte Baiano	Jacobina	Capim Grosso
Centro Norte Baiano	Jacobina	Jacobina
Centro Norte Baiano	Jacobina	Miguel Calmon
Centro Norte Baiano	Jacobina	Mirangaba
Centro Norte Baiano	Jacobina	Morro do Chapéu
Centro Norte Baiano	Jacobina	Ourolândia
Centro Norte Baiano	Jacobina	Piritiba
Centro Norte Baiano	Jacobina	Ponto Novo
Centro Norte Baiano	Jacobina	Quixabeira
Centro Norte Baiano	Jacobina	São José do Jacuípe
Centro Norte Baiano	Jacobina	Saúde
Centro Norte Baiano	Jacobina	Serrolândia
Centro Norte Baiano	Jacobina	Várzea do Poço
Centro Norte Baiano	Jacobina	Várzea Nova
Centro Norte Baiano	Senhor do Bonfim	Andorinha
Centro Norte Baiano	Senhor do Bonfim	Antônio Gonçalves
Centro Norte Baiano	Senhor do Bonfim	Campo Formoso
Centro Norte Baiano	Senhor do Bonfim	Filadélfia
Centro Norte Baiano	Senhor do Bonfim	Itiúba
Centro Norte Baiano	Senhor do Bonfim	Jaguarari
Centro Norte Baiano	Senhor do Bonfim	Pindobaçu
Centro Norte Baiano	Senhor do Bonfim	Senhor do Bonfim
Centro Norte Baiano	Senhor do Bonfim	Umburanas
Centro Sul Baiano	Boquira	Boquira
Centro Sul Baiano	Boquira	Botuporã
Centro Sul Baiano	Boquira	Brotas de Macaúbas
Centro Sul Baiano	Boquira	Caturama
Centro Sul Baiano	Boquira	Ibipitanga
Centro Sul Baiano	Boquira	Ibitiara
Centro Sul Baiano	Boquira	Ipupiara
Centro Sul Baiano	Boquira	Macaúbas
Centro Sul Baiano	Boquira	Novo Horizonte
Centro Sul Baiano	Boquira	Oliveira dos Brejinhos
Centro Sul Baiano	Boquira	Tanque Novo
Centro Sul Baiano	Brumado	Aracatu
Centro Sul Baiano	Brumado	Brumado
Centro Sul Baiano	Brumado	Caraíbas
Centro Sul Baiano	Brumado	Condeúba
Centro Sul Baiano	Brumado	Cordeiros
Centro Sul Baiano	Brumado	Guajeru
Centro Sul Baiano	Brumado	Ituaçu
Centro Sul Baiano	Brumado	Maetinga
Centro Sul Baiano	Brumado	Malhada de Pedras
Centro Sul Baiano	Brumado	Piripá
Centro Sul Baiano	Brumado	Presidente Jânio Quadros
Centro Sul Baiano	Brumado	Rio do Antônio
Centro Sul Baiano	Brumado	Tanhaçu
Centro Sul Baiano	Brumado	Tremedal
Centro Sul Baiano	Guanambi	Caculé
Centro Sul Baiano	Guanambi	Caetité
Centro Sul Baiano	Guanambi	Candiba
Centro Sul Baiano	Guanambi	Guanambi
Centro Sul Baiano	Guanambi	Ibiassucê
Centro Sul Baiano	Guanambi	Igaporã
Centro Sul Baiano	Guanambi	Iuiú
Centro Sul Baiano	Guanambi	Jacaraci
Centro Sul Baiano	Guanambi	Lagoa Real
Centro Sul Baiano	Guanambi	Licínio de Almeida
Centro Sul Baiano	Guanambi	Malhada
Centro Sul Baiano	Guanambi	Matina
Centro Sul Baiano	Guanambi	Mortugaba
Centro Sul Baiano	Guanambi	Palmas de Monte Alto
Centro Sul Baiano	Guanambi	Pindaí
Centro Sul Baiano	Guanambi	Riacho de Santana
Centro Sul Baiano	Guanambi	Sebastião Laranjeiras
Centro Sul Baiano	Guanambi	Urandi
Centro Sul Baiano	Itapetinga	Encruzilhada
Centro Sul Baiano	Itapetinga	Itambé
Centro Sul Baiano	Itapetinga	Itapetinga
Centro Sul Baiano	Itapetinga	Itarantim
Centro Sul Baiano	Itapetinga	Itororó
Centro Sul Baiano	Itapetinga	Macarani
Centro Sul Baiano	Itapetinga	Maiquinique
Centro Sul Baiano	Itapetinga	Potiraguá
Centro Sul Baiano	Itapetinga	Ribeirão do Largo
Centro Sul Baiano	Jequié	Aiquara
Centro Sul Baiano	Jequié	Amargosa
Centro Sul Baiano	Jequié	Apuarema
Centro Sul Baiano	Jequié	Brejões
Centro Sul Baiano	Jequié	Cravolândia
Centro Sul Baiano	Jequié	Irajuba
Centro Sul Baiano	Jequié	Iramaia
Centro Sul Baiano	Jequié	Itagi
Centro Sul Baiano	Jequié	Itaquara
Centro Sul Baiano	Jequié	Itiruçu
Centro Sul Baiano	Jequié	Jaguaquara
Centro Sul Baiano	Jequié	Jequié
Centro Sul Baiano	Jequié	Jiquiriçá
Centro Sul Baiano	Jequié	Jitaúna
Centro Sul Baiano	Jequié	Lafaiete Coutinho
Centro Sul Baiano	Jequié	Laje
Centro Sul Baiano	Jequié	Lajedo do Tabocal
Centro Sul Baiano	Jequié	Maracás
Centro Sul Baiano	Jequié	Marcionílio Souza
Centro Sul Baiano	Jequié	Milagres
Centro Sul Baiano	Jequié	Mutuípe
Centro Sul Baiano	Jequié	Nova Itarana
Centro Sul Baiano	Jequié	Planaltino
Centro Sul Baiano	Jequié	Santa Inês
Centro Sul Baiano	Jequié	São Miguel das Matas
Centro Sul Baiano	Jequié	Ubaíra
Centro Sul Baiano	Livramento do Brumado	Dom Basílio
Centro Sul Baiano	Livramento do Brumado	Érico Cardoso
Centro Sul Baiano	Livramento do Brumado	Livramento de Nossa Senhora
Centro Sul Baiano	Livramento do Brumado	Paramirim
Centro Sul Baiano	Livramento do Brumado	Rio do Pires
Centro Sul Baiano	Seabra	Abaíra
Centro Sul Baiano	Seabra	Andaraí
Centro Sul Baiano	Seabra	Barra da Estiva
Centro Sul Baiano	Seabra	Boninal
Centro Sul Baiano	Seabra	Bonito
Centro Sul Baiano	Seabra	Contendas do Sincorá
Centro Sul Baiano	Seabra	Ibicoara
Centro Sul Baiano	Seabra	Itaetê
Centro Sul Baiano	Seabra	Jussiape
Centro Sul Baiano	Seabra	Lençóis
Centro Sul Baiano	Seabra	Mucugê
Centro Sul Baiano	Seabra	Nova Redenção
Centro Sul Baiano	Seabra	Palmeiras
Centro Sul Baiano	Seabra	Piatã
Centro Sul Baiano	Seabra	Rio de Contas
Centro Sul Baiano	Seabra	Seabra
Centro Sul Baiano	Seabra	Utinga
Centro Sul Baiano	Seabra	Wagner
Centro Sul Baiano	Vitória da Conquista	Anagé
Centro Sul Baiano	Vitória da Conquista	Barra do Choça
Centro Sul Baiano	Vitória da Conquista	Belo Campo
Centro Sul Baiano	Vitória da Conquista	Boa Nova
Centro Sul Baiano	Vitória da Conquista	Bom Jesus da Serra
Centro Sul Baiano	Vitória da Conquista	Caatiba
Centro Sul Baiano	Vitória da Conquista	Caetanos
Centro Sul Baiano	Vitória da Conquista	Cândido Sales
Centro Sul Baiano	Vitória da Conquista	Dário Meira
Centro Sul Baiano	Vitória da Conquista	Ibicuí
Centro Sul Baiano	Vitória da Conquista	Iguaí
Centro Sul Baiano	Vitória da Conquista	Manoel Vitorino
Centro Sul Baiano	Vitória da Conquista	Mirante
Centro Sul Baiano	Vitória da Conquista	Nova Canaã
Centro Sul Baiano	Vitória da Conquista	Planalto
Centro Sul Baiano	Vitória da Conquista	Poções
Centro Sul Baiano	Vitória da Conquista	Vitória da Conquista
Extremo Oeste Baiano	Barreiras	Baianópolis
Extremo Oeste Baiano	Barreiras	Barreiras
Extremo Oeste Baiano	Barreiras	Catolândia
Extremo Oeste Baiano	Barreiras	Formosa do Rio Preto
Extremo Oeste Baiano	Barreiras	Luís Eduardo Magalhães
Extremo Oeste Baiano	Barreiras	Riachão das Neves
Extremo Oeste Baiano	Barreiras	São Desidério
Extremo Oeste Baiano	Cotegipe	Angical
Extremo Oeste Baiano	Cotegipe	Brejolândia
Extremo Oeste Baiano	Cotegipe	Cotegipe
Extremo Oeste Baiano	Cotegipe	Cristópolis
Extremo Oeste Baiano	Cotegipe	Mansidão
Extremo Oeste Baiano	Cotegipe	Santa Rita de Cássia
Extremo Oeste Baiano	Cotegipe	Tabocas do Brejo Velho
Extremo Oeste Baiano	Cotegipe	Wanderley
Extremo Oeste Baiano	Santa Maria da Vitória	Canápolis
Extremo Oeste Baiano	Santa Maria da Vitória	Cocos
Extremo Oeste Baiano	Santa Maria da Vitória	Coribe
Extremo Oeste Baiano	Santa Maria da Vitória	Correntina
Extremo Oeste Baiano	Santa Maria da Vitória	Jaborandi
Extremo Oeste Baiano	Santa Maria da Vitória	Santa Maria da Vitória
Extremo Oeste Baiano	Santa Maria da Vitória	Santana
Extremo Oeste Baiano	Santa Maria da Vitória	São Félix do Coribe
Extremo Oeste Baiano	Santa Maria da Vitória	Serra Dourada
Metropolitana de Salvador	Catu	Catu
Metropolitana de Salvador	Catu	Conceição do Jacuípe
Metropolitana de Salvador	Catu	Itanagra
Metropolitana de Salvador	Catu	Mata de São João
Metropolitana de Salvador	Catu	Pojuca
Metropolitana de Salvador	Catu	São Sebastião do Passé
Metropolitana de Salvador	Catu	Terra Nova
Metropolitana de Salvador	Salvador	Camaçari
Metropolitana de Salvador	Salvador	Candeias
Metropolitana de Salvador	Salvador	Dias d'Ávila
Metropolitana de Salvador	Salvador	Itaparica
Metropolitana de Salvador	Salvador	Lauro de Freitas
Metropolitana de Salvador	Salvador	Madre de Deus
Metropolitana de Salvador	Salvador	Salvador (State Capital)
Metropolitana de Salvador	Salvador	São Francisco do Conde
Metropolitana de Salvador	Salvador	Simões Filho
Metropolitana de Salvador	Salvador	Vera Cruz
Metropolitana de Salvador	Santo Antônio de Jesus	Aratuípe
Metropolitana de Salvador	Santo Antônio de Jesus	Cabaceiras do Paraguaçu
Metropolitana de Salvador	Santo Antônio de Jesus	Cachoeira
Metropolitana de Salvador	Santo Antônio de Jesus	Castro Alves
Metropolitana de Salvador	Santo Antônio de Jesus	Conceição do Almeida
Metropolitana de Salvador	Santo Antônio de Jesus	Cruz das Almas
Metropolitana de Salvador	Santo Antônio de Jesus	Dom Macedo Costa
Metropolitana de Salvador	Santo Antônio de Jesus	Governador Mangabeira
Metropolitana de Salvador	Santo Antônio de Jesus	Jaguaripe
Metropolitana de Salvador	Santo Antônio de Jesus	Maragogipe
Metropolitana de Salvador	Santo Antônio de Jesus	Muniz Ferreira
Metropolitana de Salvador	Santo Antônio de Jesus	Muritiba
Metropolitana de Salvador	Santo Antônio de Jesus	Nazaré
Metropolitana de Salvador	Santo Antônio de Jesus	Salinas da Margarida
Metropolitana de Salvador	Santo Antônio de Jesus	Santo Amaro
Metropolitana de Salvador	Santo Antônio de Jesus	Santo Antônio de Jesus
Metropolitana de Salvador	Santo Antônio de Jesus	São Felipe
Metropolitana de Salvador	Santo Antônio de Jesus	São Félix
Metropolitana de Salvador	Santo Antônio de Jesus	Sapeaçu
Metropolitana de Salvador	Santo Antônio de Jesus	Saubara
Metropolitana de Salvador	Santo Antônio de Jesus	Varzedo
Nordeste Baiano	Alagoinhas	Acajutiba
Nordeste Baiano	Alagoinhas	Alagoinhas
Nordeste Baiano	Alagoinhas	Aporá
Nordeste Baiano	Alagoinhas	Araçás
Nordeste Baiano	Alagoinhas	Aramari
Nordeste Baiano	Alagoinhas	Barrocas
Nordeste Baiano	Alagoinhas	Crisópolis
Nordeste Baiano	Alagoinhas	Inhambupe
Nordeste Baiano	Alagoinhas	Rio Real
Nordeste Baiano	Alagoinhas	Sátiro Dias
Nordeste Baiano	Entre Rios	Cardeal da Silva
Nordeste Baiano	Entre Rios	Conde
Nordeste Baiano	Entre Rios	Entre Rios
Nordeste Baiano	Entre Rios	Esplanada
Nordeste Baiano	Entre Rios	Jandaíra
Nordeste Baiano	Euclides da Cunha	Cansanção
Nordeste Baiano	Euclides da Cunha	Canudos
Nordeste Baiano	Euclides da Cunha	Euclides da Cunha
Nordeste Baiano	Euclides da Cunha	Monte Santo
Nordeste Baiano	Euclides da Cunha	Nordestina
Nordeste Baiano	Euclides da Cunha	Queimadas
Nordeste Baiano	Euclides da Cunha	Quijingue
Nordeste Baiano	Euclides da Cunha	Tucano
Nordeste Baiano	Euclides da Cunha	Uauá
Nordeste Baiano	Jeremoabo	Coronel João Sá
Nordeste Baiano	Jeremoabo	Jeremoabo
Nordeste Baiano	Jeremoabo	Pedro Alexandre
Nordeste Baiano	Jeremoabo	Santa Brígida
Nordeste Baiano	Jeremoabo	Sítio do Quinto
Nordeste Baiano	Ribeira do Pombal	Adustina
Nordeste Baiano	Ribeira do Pombal	Antas
Nordeste Baiano	Ribeira do Pombal	Banzaê
Nordeste Baiano	Ribeira do Pombal	Cícero Dantas
Nordeste Baiano	Ribeira do Pombal	Cipó
Nordeste Baiano	Ribeira do Pombal	Fátima
Nordeste Baiano	Ribeira do Pombal	Heliópolis
Nordeste Baiano	Ribeira do Pombal	Itapicuru
Nordeste Baiano	Ribeira do Pombal	Nova Soure
Nordeste Baiano	Ribeira do Pombal	Novo Triunfo
Nordeste Baiano	Ribeira do Pombal	Olindina
Nordeste Baiano	Ribeira do Pombal	Paripiranga
Nordeste Baiano	Ribeira do Pombal	Ribeira do Amparo
Nordeste Baiano	Ribeira do Pombal	Ribeira do Pombal
Nordeste Baiano	Serrinha	Araci
Nordeste Baiano	Serrinha	Biritinga
Nordeste Baiano	Serrinha	Candeal
Nordeste Baiano	Serrinha	Capela do Alto Alegre
Nordeste Baiano	Serrinha	Conceição do Coité
Nordeste Baiano	Serrinha	Gavião
Nordeste Baiano	Serrinha	Ichu
Nordeste Baiano	Serrinha	Lamarão
Nordeste Baiano	Serrinha	Nova Fátima
Nordeste Baiano	Serrinha	Pé de Serra
Nordeste Baiano	Serrinha	Retirolândia
Nordeste Baiano	Serrinha	Riachão do Jacuípe
Nordeste Baiano	Serrinha	Santaluz
Nordeste Baiano	Serrinha	São Domingos
Nordeste Baiano	Serrinha	Serrinha
Nordeste Baiano	Serrinha	Teofilândia
Nordeste Baiano	Serrinha	Valente
Sul Baiano	Ilhéus-Itabuna	Almadina
Sul Baiano	Ilhéus-Itabuna	Arataca
Sul Baiano	Ilhéus-Itabuna	Aurelino Leal
Sul Baiano	Ilhéus-Itabuna	Barra do Rocha
Sul Baiano	Ilhéus-Itabuna	Barro Preto
Sul Baiano	Ilhéus-Itabuna	Belmonte
Sul Baiano	Ilhéus-Itabuna	Buerarema
Sul Baiano	Ilhéus-Itabuna	Camacan
Sul Baiano	Ilhéus-Itabuna	Canavieiras
Sul Baiano	Ilhéus-Itabuna	Coaraci
Sul Baiano	Ilhéus-Itabuna	Firmino Alves
Sul Baiano	Ilhéus-Itabuna	Floresta Azul
Sul Baiano	Ilhéus-Itabuna	Gandu
Sul Baiano	Ilhéus-Itabuna	Gongogi
Sul Baiano	Ilhéus-Itabuna	Ibicaraí
Sul Baiano	Ilhéus-Itabuna	Ibirapitanga
Sul Baiano	Ilhéus-Itabuna	Ibirataia
Sul Baiano	Ilhéus-Itabuna	Ilhéus
Sul Baiano	Ilhéus-Itabuna	Ipiaú
Sul Baiano	Ilhéus-Itabuna	Itabuna
Sul Baiano	Ilhéus-Itabuna	Itacaré
Sul Baiano	Ilhéus-Itabuna	Itagibá
Sul Baiano	Ilhéus-Itabuna	Itaju do Colônia
Sul Baiano	Ilhéus-Itabuna	Itajuípe
Sul Baiano	Ilhéus-Itabuna	Itamari
Sul Baiano	Ilhéus-Itabuna	Itapé
Sul Baiano	Ilhéus-Itabuna	Itapebi
Sul Baiano	Ilhéus-Itabuna	Itapitanga
Sul Baiano	Ilhéus-Itabuna	Jussari
Sul Baiano	Ilhéus-Itabuna	Mascote
Sul Baiano	Ilhéus-Itabuna	Nova Ibiá
Sul Baiano	Ilhéus-Itabuna	Pau Brasil
Sul Baiano	Ilhéus-Itabuna	Santa Cruz da Vitória
Sul Baiano	Ilhéus-Itabuna	Santa Luzia
Sul Baiano	Ilhéus-Itabuna	São José da Vitória
Sul Baiano	Ilhéus-Itabuna	Teolândia
Sul Baiano	Ilhéus-Itabuna	Ubaitaba
Sul Baiano	Ilhéus-Itabuna	Ubatã
Sul Baiano	Ilhéus-Itabuna	Una
Sul Baiano	Ilhéus-Itabuna	Uruçuca
Sul Baiano	Ilhéus-Itabuna	Wenceslau Guimarães
Sul Baiano	Porto Seguro	Alcobaça
Sul Baiano	Porto Seguro	Caravelas
Sul Baiano	Porto Seguro	Eunápolis
Sul Baiano	Porto Seguro	Guaratinga
Sul Baiano	Porto Seguro	Ibirapuã
Sul Baiano	Porto Seguro	Itabela
Sul Baiano	Porto Seguro	Itagimirim
Sul Baiano	Porto Seguro	Itamaraju
Sul Baiano	Porto Seguro	Itanhém
Sul Baiano	Porto Seguro	Jucuruçu
Sul Baiano	Porto Seguro	Lajedão
Sul Baiano	Porto Seguro	Medeiros Neto
Sul Baiano	Porto Seguro	Mucuri
Sul Baiano	Porto Seguro	Nova Viçosa
Sul Baiano	Porto Seguro	Porto Seguro
Sul Baiano	Porto Seguro	Prado
Sul Baiano	Porto Seguro	Santa Cruz Cabrália
Sul Baiano	Porto Seguro	Teixeira de Freitas
Sul Baiano	Porto Seguro	Vereda
Sul Baiano	Valença	Cairu
Sul Baiano	Valença	Camamu
Sul Baiano	Valença	Igrapiúna
Sul Baiano	Valença	Ituberá
Sul Baiano	Valença	Maraú
Sul Baiano	Valença	Nilo Peçanha
Sul Baiano	Valença	Piraí do Norte
Sul Baiano	Valença	Presidente Tancredo Neves
Sul Baiano	Valença	Taperoá
Sul Baiano	Valença	Valença
Vale São-Franciscano da Bahia	Barra	Barra
Vale São-Franciscano da Bahia	Barra	Buritirama
Vale São-Franciscano da Bahia	Barra	Ibotirama
Vale São-Franciscano da Bahia	Barra	Itaguaçu da Bahia
Vale São-Franciscano da Bahia	Barra	Morpará
Vale São-Franciscano da Bahia	Barra	Muquém de São Francisco
Vale São-Franciscano da Bahia	Barra	Xique-Xique
Vale São-Franciscano da Bahia	Bom Jesus da Lapa	Bom Jesus da Lapa
Vale São-Franciscano da Bahia	Bom Jesus da Lapa	Carinhanha
Vale São-Franciscano da Bahia	Bom Jesus da Lapa	Feira da Mata
Vale São-Franciscano da Bahia	Bom Jesus da Lapa	Paratinga
Vale São-Franciscano da Bahia	Bom Jesus da Lapa	Serra do Ramalho
Vale São-Franciscano da Bahia	Bom Jesus da Lapa	Sítio do Mato
Vale São-Franciscano da Bahia	Juazeiro	Campo Alegre de Lourdes
Vale São-Franciscano da Bahia	Juazeiro	Casa Nova
Vale São-Franciscano da Bahia	Juazeiro	Curaçá
Vale São-Franciscano da Bahia	Juazeiro	Juazeiro
Vale São-Franciscano da Bahia	Juazeiro	Pilão Arcado
Vale São-Franciscano da Bahia	Juazeiro	Remanso
Vale São-Franciscano da Bahia	Juazeiro	Sento Sé
Vale São-Franciscano da Bahia	Juazeiro	Sobradinho
Vale São-Franciscano da Bahia	Paulo Afonso	Abaré
Vale São-Franciscano da Bahia	Paulo Afonso	Chorrochó
Vale São-Franciscano da Bahia	Paulo Afonso	Glória
Vale São-Franciscano da Bahia	Paulo Afonso	Macururé
Vale São-Franciscano da Bahia	Paulo Afonso	Paulo Afonso
Vale São-Franciscano da Bahia	Paulo Afonso	Rodelas

== See also ==
- Geography of Brazil
- List of cities in Brazil
