= Planaltino =

Municipality of Bahia, Brazil

Coordinates: 13°15′32″S 40°22′08″W

- Municipality
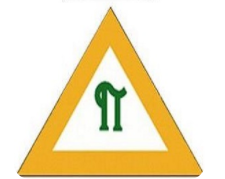
- Flag Coat of arms
- Interactive map of Planaltino
- Country: Brazil
- Region: Nordeste
- State: Bahia

Population (2022)
  - Total: 8,022
- Time zone: UTC−3 (BRT)

Planaltino is a municipality in the state of Bahia in the North-East region of Brazil.

== See also ==
- List of municipalities in Bahia
