= Brumado =

Municipality of Bahia, Brazil

- Municipality
- Brumado Municipality
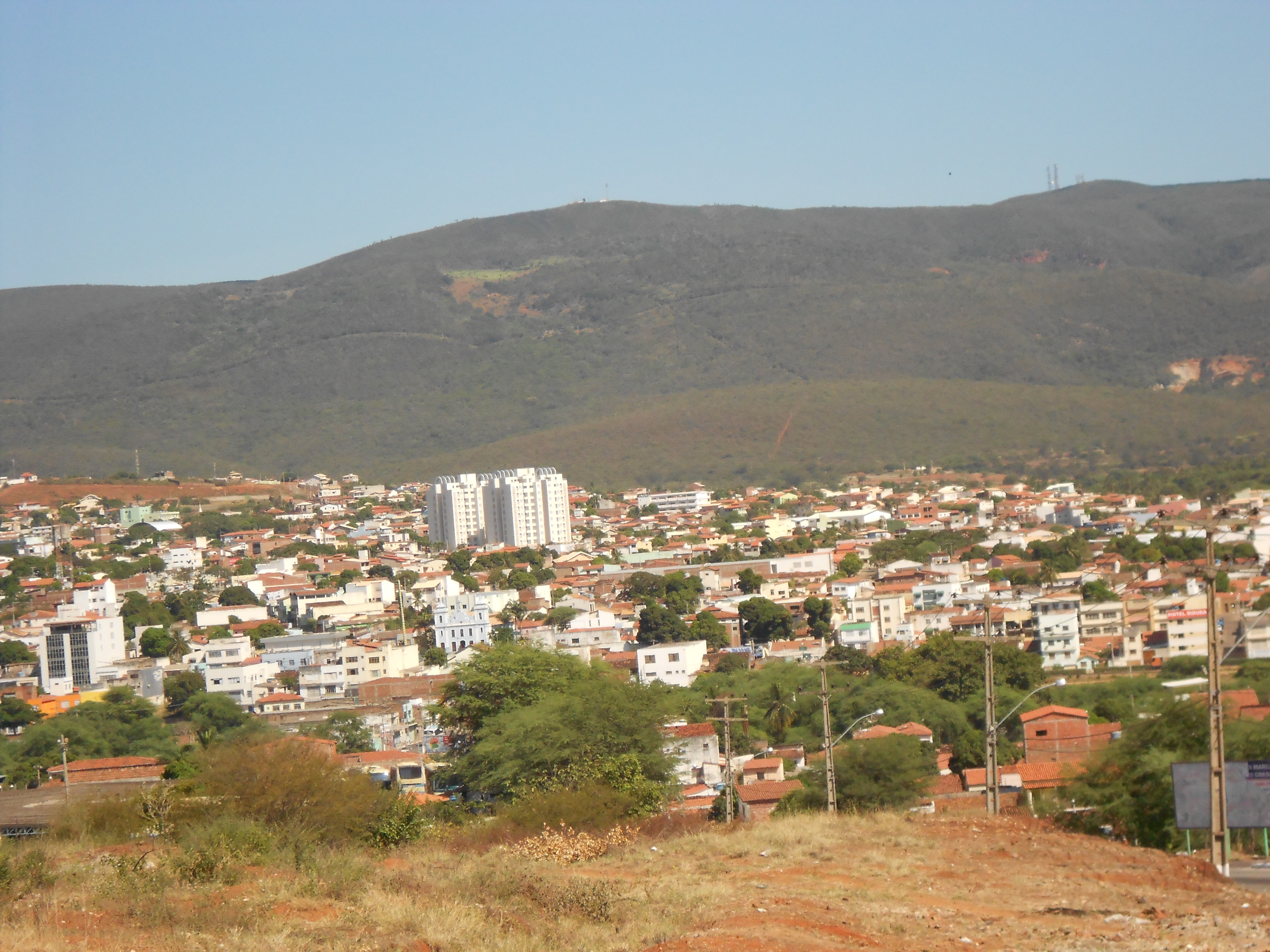
- Image of the center and neighborhood of São Félix.

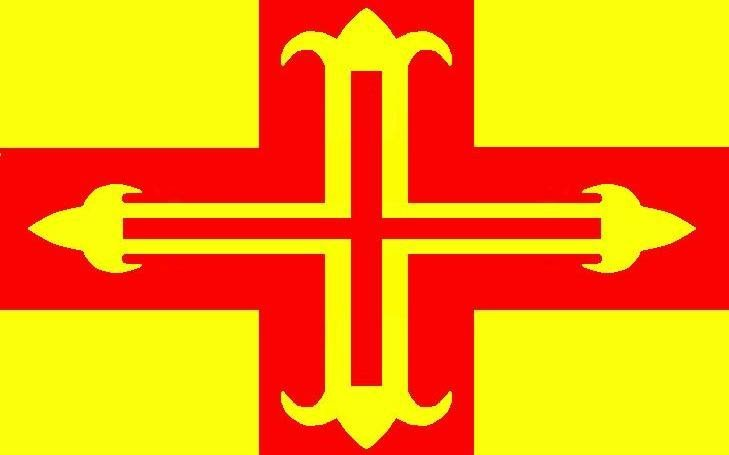
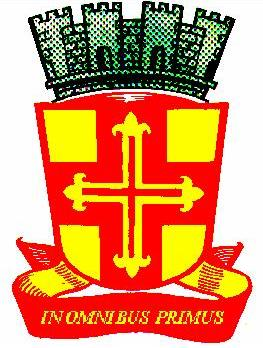
- Flag Coat of arms
- Nicknames: Capital do minério, Brumas, BDO
- Location of Brumado

- Location in Brazil
- Coordinates: 14°12′13″S 41°39′55″W
- Country: Brazil
- Region: Northeast
- State: Bahia
- Mesoregion: Of south central Bahia Mesoregion
- Microregion: Brumado Microregion
- Municipal subdivisions - districts: Ubiraçaba; Itaquaraí; Cristalândia
- Founded: June 11, 1877

Government
  - Mayor: Fabrício Abrantes (AVANTE)

Area
  - Municipality: 2,207.612 km^{2} (852.364 sq mi)
  - Urban: 2,174 km^{2} (839 sq mi)
- Elevation: 454 m (1,490 ft)

Population (2020)
  - Municipality: 70 268
  - Density: 2,901/km^{2} (7,510/sq mi)
- Time zone: UTC−3 (BRT)
- Postal Code: 46100-001 to 46120-899
- Area code: +55 77
- Website: official website

Brumado (Portuguese: [bɾuˈma.du]) is a Brazilian municipality in the interior of Bahia, in the Northeast region of the country, precisely in the Center-South mesoregion of the State, in the homonymous microregion to the do municipality name, to the do 555 kilometers from Salvador, state capital. Its territorial area is 2 207,612 square kilometers, the headquarters's area occupying 2 174 square kilometers, have altitude of 454 meters. According to data from the Brazilian Institute of Geography and Statistics (IBGE), in 2023 its population was estimated at 70 268 inhabitants. The Human Development Index (HDI) is 0.656 (average).

A survey by the Federation of Industries of Rio de Janeiro State (FIRJAN) found that Brumado is considered to be the sixth most developed municipality in Bahia, based on the FIRJAN Municipal Development Index (IFDM 2013) published in 2015. A query made exclusively by Urban Systems, in January 2016, for Exame Magazine, concluded that the city is among the 100 best in Brazil to invest, ranking 84th in the ranking, totaling 2 306 points. A study carried out by IBGE, in 2012, concluded that of the 64 602 inhabitants from the time, 50 899 were literate, 31 747 were men and 32 855 were women. The per capita income was R$12,144.11, and in distribution between rural and urban areas, in the private households in the rural area, it was R$217.00, and in the urban area it was R$333.33. The fleet of motor vehicles such as road transport, including motorcycles, as well as tractors and trucks totaled 31 000.

The city is known as "the Mining Capital" in Bahia, because it has a large amount of minerals in its subsoil, which is the basis of its economy, and has large mining companies that carry out their extractive activities in Serra das Éguas (in English, something like "Ridge of the Mares"), which, by the way, also is one of the tourist points of the mountainous landscapes of the Municipality. Brumado shares boundaries with the Municipalities of Livramento de Nossa Senhora, Dom Basílio, Aracatu, Rio de Contas, Malhada de Pedras, Tanhaçu, Ituaçu, Rio do Antônio, Lagoa Real and Caraíbas. For making border with the Municipality of Rio de Contas along the river with thew same name, consequently also makes border with the Chapada Diamantina. The city has a privileged location allied to other benefits, such as important crossroad such as the State highways BA-262 and BA-148 and federal highway BR-030, also counting on the Centro-Atlântica Railroad (FCA).

== History ==
=== Etymology ===
There are several theories about the origin of the name Brumado. According to Teodoro Fernandes Sampaio, the name "Brumado" comes from the expression Tupi language: Itimbopira (Y-timbó-pyra), which means misty, covered in fog, but according to José Dias, former priest of the city, the name originates from the Serra das Éguas, when the morning fog descends from it covering the city. Another theory says that the origin of the name Brumado is attributed to the word bromine - a word that at the time of mining on the Rio Brumado was used by garimpeiros and bandeirantes to distinguish loss or deceit, mystification or disappearance of gold in the mining site that supposedly had an abundance of that ore.

=== Settlement ===
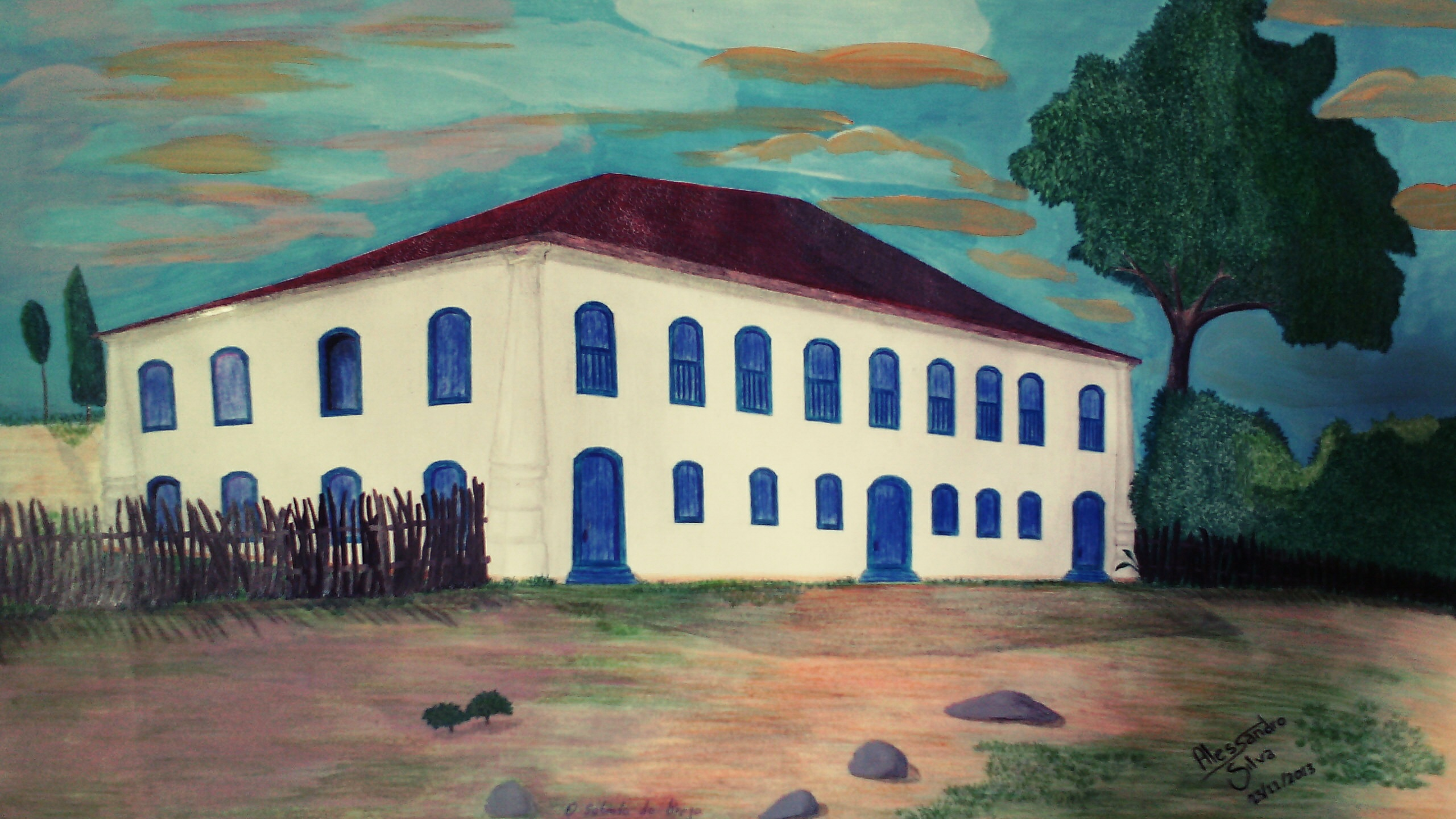
O Sobrado do Brejo (painting by Alessandro Silva) was a mansion from the 19th century. It was located in Serra Das Éguas in Brumado. It was the residence of the colonels (lords of Sobrado do Brejo). Today, it belongs to Magnesita.

In the 18th century, captain Francisco de Souza Meira and his team left the captaincy of Minas Gerais (current state of Minas Gerais), crossing the Brumado river, advancing along the right bank until reaching the mouth of the Do (Santo) Antônio river, arriving to the indigenous territory, Tupinambas fierce, and between them a great fight took place, close to the area where today is the headquarters of the Brumado Municipality. It was the first part taken and received the name "Conquista", later he founded a farm called Das Éguas Serra. Although these Indians strongly resisted the attacks of the captain and his group, they gradually dispersed, disturbed by the presence of white men.

In the future, the Serra das Éguas farm was acquired by João Antunes Moreira, who in turn left it to his son, the Catholic priest André Antunes da Maia; who finally sold it on June 30, 1749, to José de Souza Meira, son of Francisco de Souza Meira, for $462,700 (1 million, 462 thousand and 700 réis), with 232 head of cattle, 105 head of equine cattle and a black slave called Manuel. In this way, the lands returned to the hands of the Meiras. In 1755, Campo Seco farm was bought by the Portuguese Miguel Lourenço de Almeida (familia do Santo Ofício), clan of the Canguçu family in the municipality. The Serra das Éguas farm was close to the area that is now the city of Brumado. It was located on the southern slope, the lower part of a mountain, now known as Serra das Éguas, known for its deposits of magnesite and mineral talc. Over the years, a small village grew about ten kilometers from the city center on the same bank of the river, thanks to the success of the adventurers who worked in crops and livestock, giving life to the village that would later become the seat of the municipality.

=== Emancipation ===
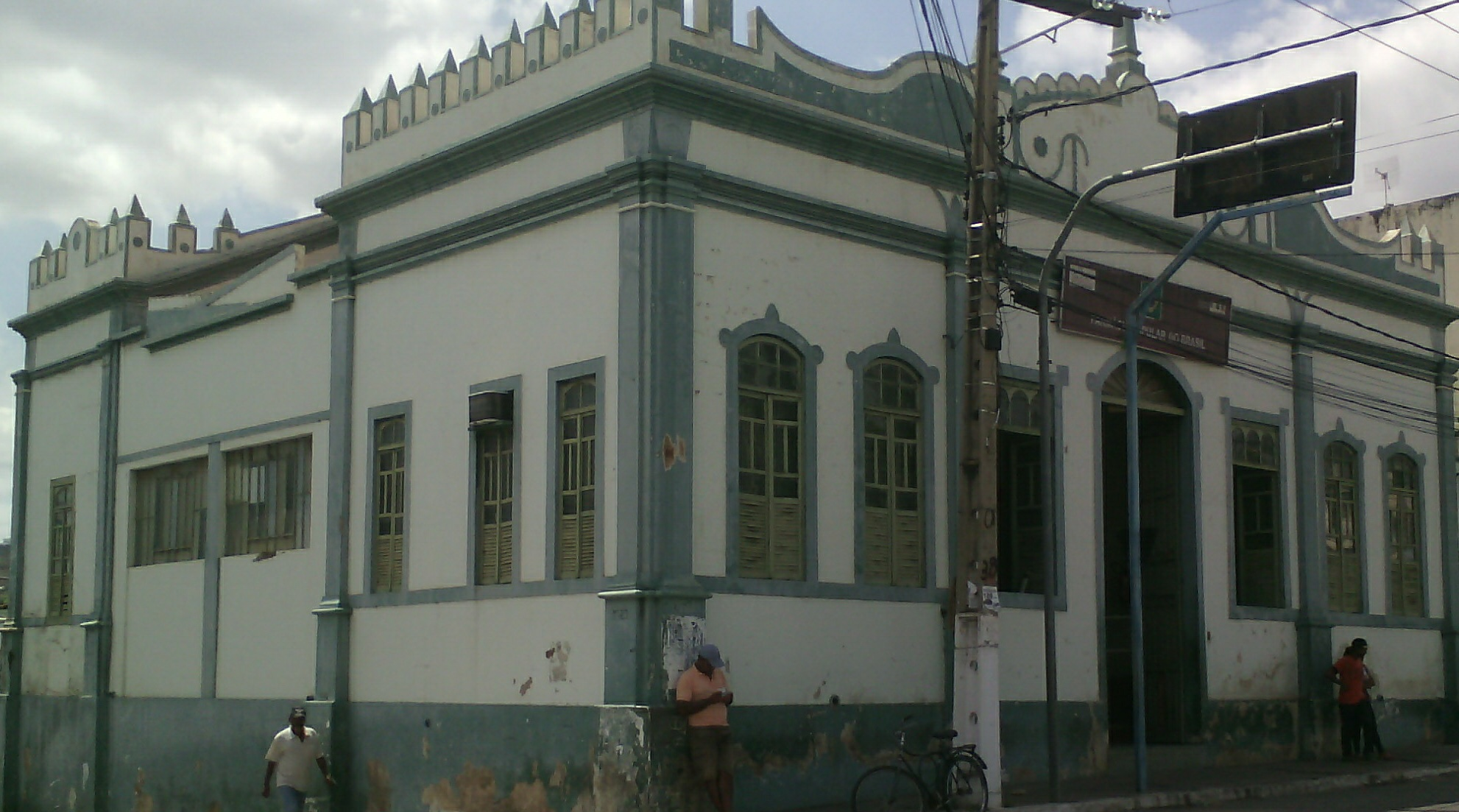
Old City Hall.

The region where Brumado is now located belonged to the colonial Comarca (Municipality) of Minas do Rio de Contas from 1723 to 1810, when created the Municipality of Vila Nova do Príncipe e Santana de Caitité (currently Caetité). On June 19, 1869, still under the name of Freguesia do Bom Jesus dos Meiras, the then Vice-President of the imperial Province of Bahia, Antônio Ledeslau de Figueiredo Rocha, signed Provincial Decree-Law No. 1091, thus transforming Bom Jesus dos Meiras into a district under the same name, as part of Caetité. Soon after, Antônio Pinheiro Pinto Canguçu, the second lord of Sobrado do Brejo, contributed financially and with labor to build the Chapel of Bom Jesus, attending the requests of the inhabitants; Today, the old chapel is the mother church of Brumado, that at that time was called Church Senhor do Bonfim, in honor of the patron of the city, Bom Jesus, and had like first vicar the priest Jose Mariano Meira Rocha. Bom Jesus dos Meiras separated from Caetité in 1877, receiving the title of village. The author of the project was a Provincial Deputy of Bahia, Marcolino Moura. The political leader at that time was Colonel Exupério Pinheiro Canguçu, the fourth and last lord of Sobrado do Brejo. Political emancipation occurred on June 11, 1877(Provincial Law n° 1756). The first City Council of Bom Jesus dos Meiras was inaugurated on February 13, 1878, composed by: Colonel Exupério Pinheiro Canguçu (as president); Belarmino Jacundes Lobo (as secretary); Rufiniano de Moura Amorim (as procuror); Plácido Guedes d'Oliveira (as supervisor); Francisco Alves Piranha (as usher ou chamberlain).

In 1948, Armindo dos Santos Azevedo took office as the first elected mayor by direct vote. The merchant and cattle rancher was elected for three terms: 1948 - 1950, 1955 - 1958 and 1963 - 1966. In its management, the Municipality achieved great advances, such as water supply, electricity and paving of many streets and squares in the center of city. The energy in Brumado in the 1940s to 1970s only worked until 9:30 p.m. It was from then on that the energy began to function in an integral way. In 1962, the districts of Santa Bárbara dos Casados, Olhos d'Água and São Pedro would have their toponyms changed to Ubiraçaba, Itaquaraí and Aracatu, respectively. From 1967 to 1970, the mayor was elected doctor Juracy Pires Gomes, with the support of partner Armindo dos Santos Azevedo. In his mandate important works were carried out, such as the new city hall, the new municipal market, the city's first public library; The main one was the dam of the Do Antônio River that would supply the city until the year 2010.

== Economic expansion ==
At the beginning of the 20th century, the economy was based on agriculture: large-scale cotton farming, coffee and cereals, and cattle raising, goats, sheep and cattle, favoring the export of sheep skins raw or tanned, dry leather and salty, as well as lump cotton and live cattle. Cotton was the culture that most contributed to the economic development of the municipality. Between 1930 and 1955, the production was so great that the producers started to benefit it in the field even using handmade machines. Faced with the success of cotton growing, modern cotton factories were installed in the city. The municipality had six plants in operation. Since 1980, the crop has declined, due to several factors, as an interruption of financial aid by the government, (such as crop insurance), cotton boll weevil (pests that destroy crops), high interest rates for production financing, and of the processing. Currently, the production of passion fruit has been outstanding, in the district of Itaquaraí, one of the largest production locations in Brazil.

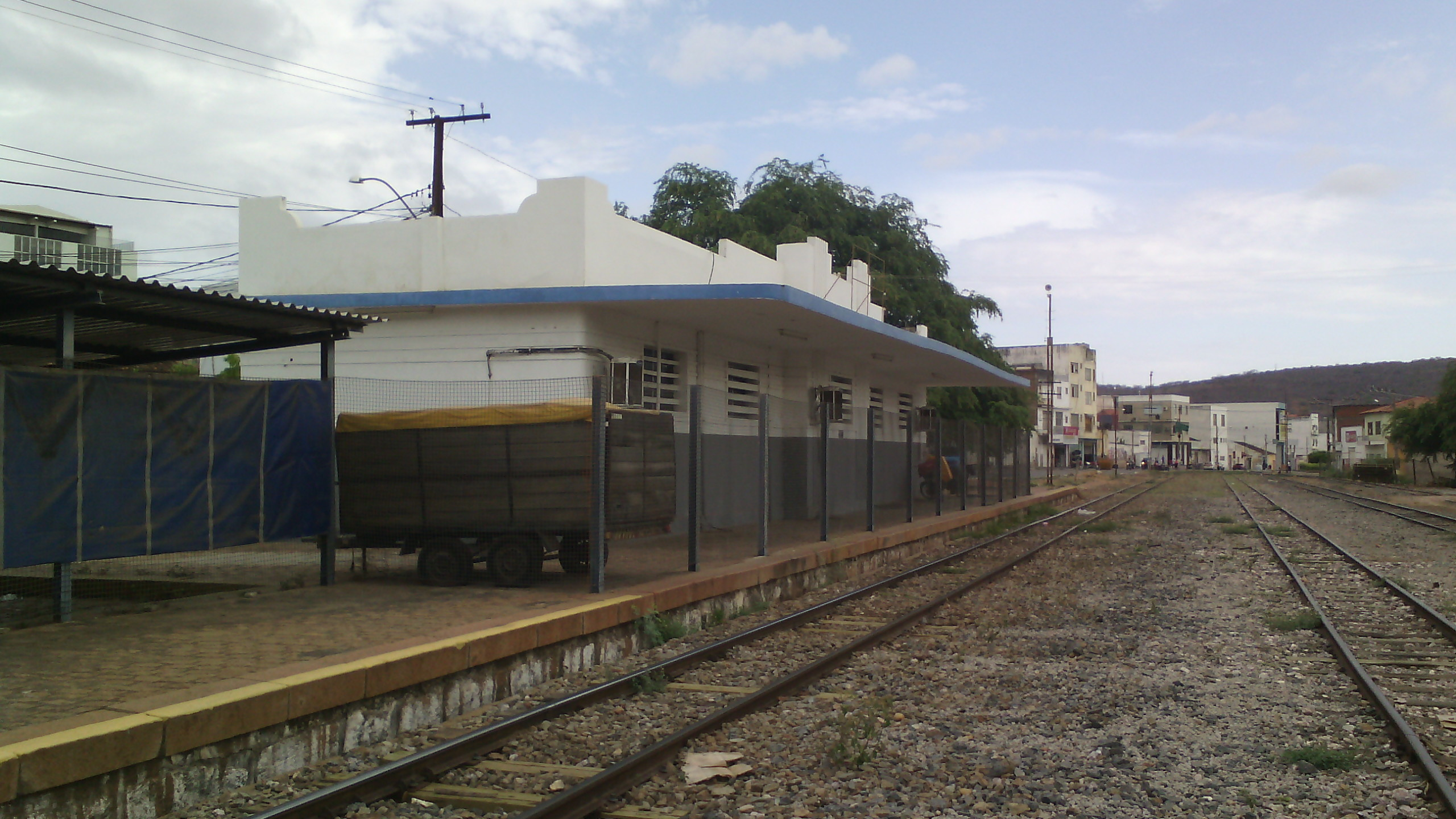
Old train station.

In 1930, two important events marked the economic history of the municipality: the arrival of the mining company Magnesita S.A., today, RHI Magnesita founded by two French friends naturalized Brazilian and resident in Brazil, Miguel Pierre Cahen and Georges Louis Minviele - in partnership with Antônio Mourão Guimarães -, a politician of the time, and the construction of the Federal Railroad Network (RFFSA), which would facilitate the transportation of the newly discovered ore to the port of Aratu in Salvador. Both events occurred in 1939. The Magnesita company was authorized to operate in 1940 through Decree nº 6220 and since then, it has exploited most of the magnesite and mineral talc reserves contained in Das Éguas Saw. In the 1970s, Brumado arrived at the Brazilian Refractory Products Industries (IBAR S.A.). The company interested in extracting magnesite has established its facilities in the northern part of the saw. In the following years, the municipality witnessed great changes, such as large-scale population growth, construction of houses and commercial establishments. Faced with this great attraction, people from other cities were arriving, commerce strengthened, and the Brumado city became known by recent events. To the south of the former Das Éguas farm was formed a kind of closed condominium: the Catiboaba village; The Presidente Getúlio Vargas village was also formed around the company, fruit of the flow of workers who came from the most varied places to work in the mines of magnesite and mineral talc. In 1969, it was the turn of Xilolite S.A., which also settled on the north side of the mountain range and has since exploited magnesite and mineral talc, with the acquisition of one of the mines in 1973. In 1993, Matsulfur, a cement factory, later acquired by Lafarge, under the name Cement Brumado, today Cimpor, Cimento de Portugal (Cement of Portugal), belonging to InterCement (Camargo Corrêa Group).

== Geography ==
The Brumado municipality is located in the Center South (or Southwest) of Bahia, in the region known geographically as the Polygon of the Droughts, in Serra Geral, under the coordinates: 14° 12' 13", south latitude; 41° 39' 55" west longitude, at 454 meters altitude and is 555 kilometers southwest of Salvador. The urban area covers an area of 2 174 square kilometers. There is no information if there is a point higher than the Das Éguas Saw peak, probably this is the highest point of the municipality, with 1 100 meters. The municipality limits with Livramento de Nossa Senhora and Dom Basilio, to the north; Rio de Contas, Ituaçu and Tanhaçu, to the northeast; Aracatu, to the east; Rio do Antônio and Lagoa Real, to the west; Malhada de Pedras to the southwest and the Caraíbas to the south. Its micro-region has a homonymous name. The urbanization rate is 69.86%, population density is 29.01 inhabitants per square kilometer.

=== Relief and hydrography ===
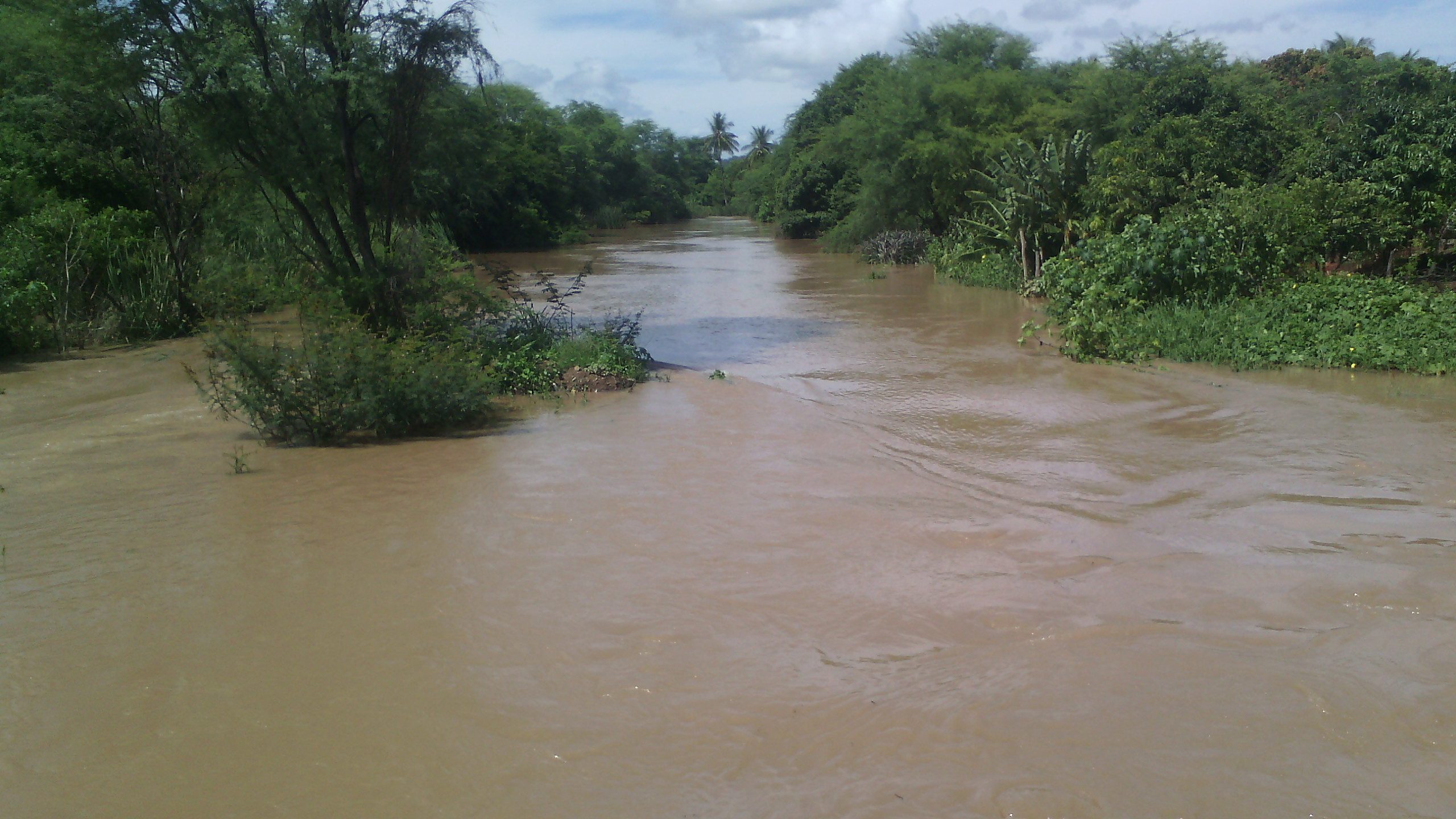
Antônio River, Brumado.

The Brumado municipality is characterized by mountainous formations typical of the Serra do Espinhaço (Of Espinhaço Mountain), which is the mountainous chain that occupies much of the southwest of the State and which belongs the relief of the municipality. The relief of Brumado is very bumpy, presenting mountainous areas denominated mountains and/or altomontanas, like the Das Éguas Saw and Black stone hill (Morro da Pedra Preta). There are also level areas, which are flat and / or wavy forms, which make the transition between the upper and lower areas, forming species of stairs. Also has flat and flat relief shapes. In general, the Brumadian relief is quite rugged, slightly undulating and presents erosions due to the floods, favorable characteristics for biodiversity, contributing to a wide variety of species, both in flora and fauna.

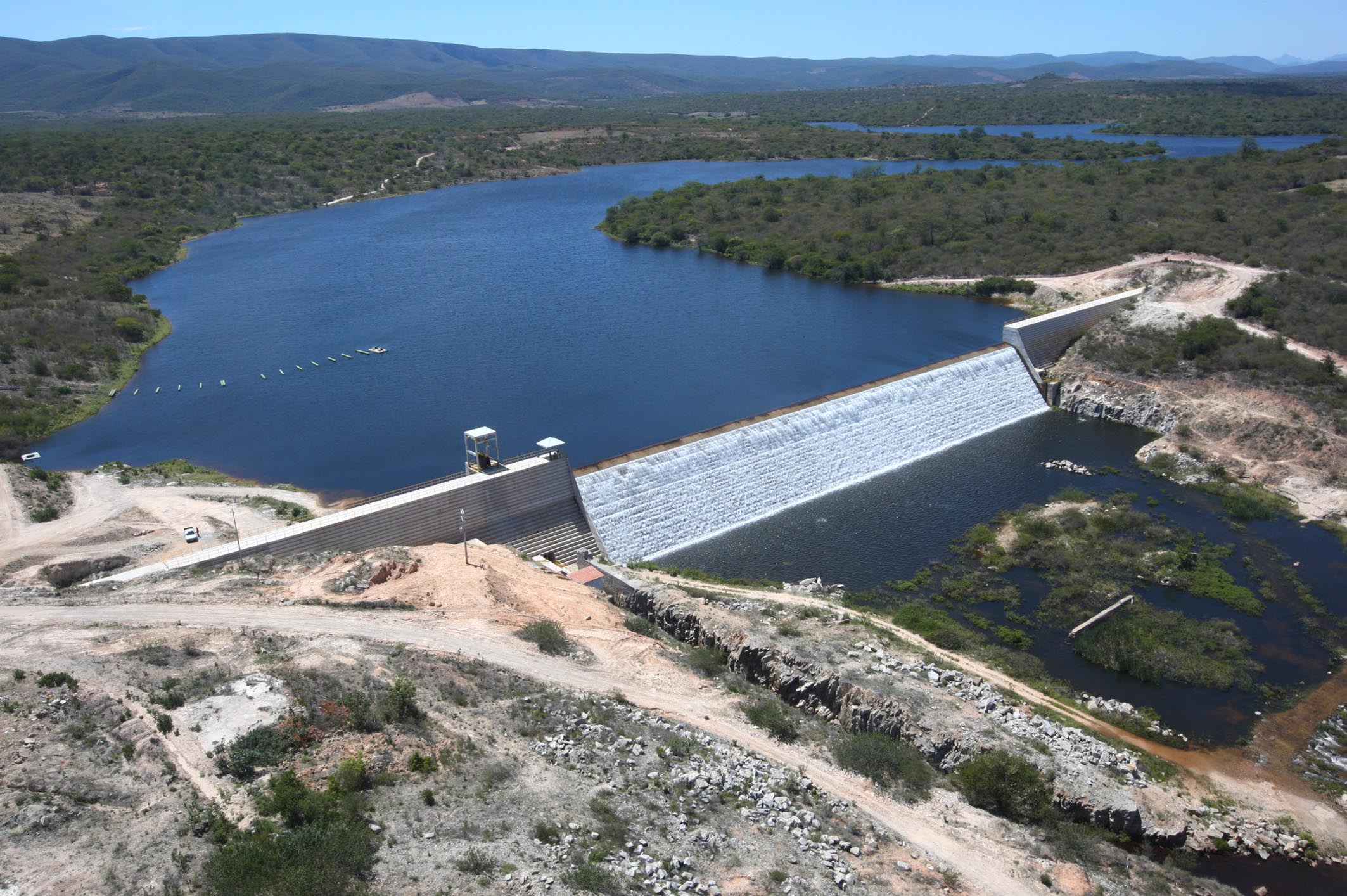
The dam of Cristalândia.

The Brumado municipality is part of the De Contas River basin and of the Do Antônio River sub-basin, which also includes the municipalities: Caculé, Rio do Antônio, Licínio de Almeida, Guajeru and Malhada de Pedras. The main drains of the Do Contas River basin are: Brumado River, São João River, Santa Maria Stream, Do Antônio River and Gavião River; The main tributaries of Antônio River are: Paiol River, Do Salto River and Do Quirino Stream. The Antônio River Basin has an area of 6,540 square kilometers. Two of the great tributaries are born in very different places: the Brumado River, affluent of the Contas, is born in the Saw of souls (Serra das Almas) and of Antônio River in General Saw (Serra Geral), in Licínio de Almeida municipality. In De Contas River is inserted the dam of Cristalândia Which supplies the city, and in Do Antônio River, the dam of the Antônio River, which supplied the urban population by 2010. Most rivers are temporary, such as Do Antônio River and São João River. The De Contas River Basin has annual precipitation between 700 and 800 mm, with little possibility of major floods. The average temperature is 22 °C. It is characterized by two biomes: Caatinga and Atlantic Forest (Mata Atlântica), which have suffered deforestation, to give way to agriculture and urbanization. It covers an area of 4 477.62 square kilometers. The municipality that most demands water from the basin is Jequié. The sub basin of the Do Antônio River has suffered over time with water degradation, due to the intense pollution of its waters, deforestation of the riparian forests and the excess of dams that are built. The main drainage of the sub basin, the river of the same name, has as its main function human supply, with minimum use for irrigation.

=== Geomorphology ===
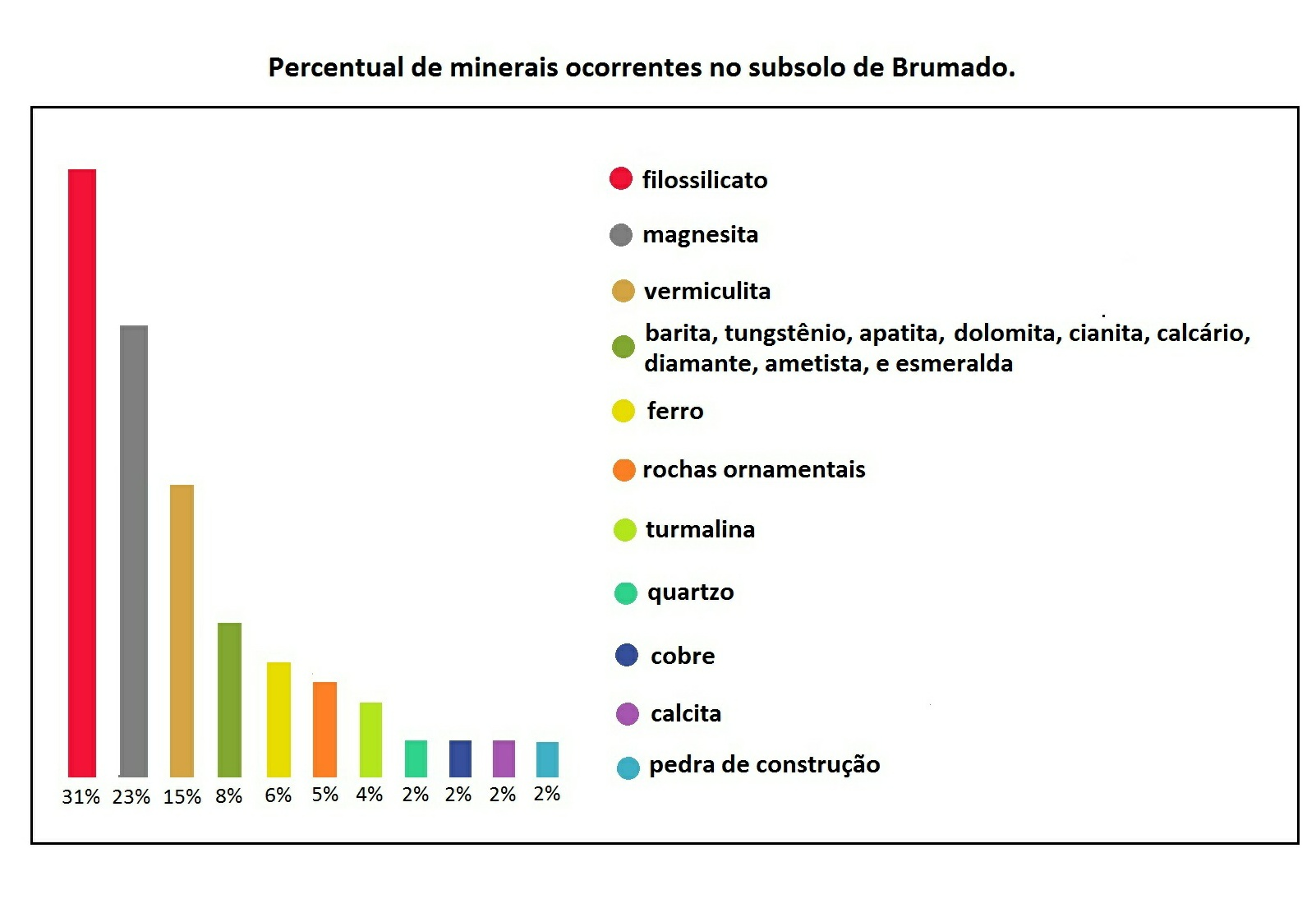
Graph of occurrences of minerals in Das Éguas Saw.

Geologically, Brumado is located in the São Francisco Craton, precisely in the Gavião Geological Block, in the Greenstone Belts Umburanas. In these areas, the rocks are formed by metavolcanic sequences, that is to say of very old volcanic actions, which favored the formation of metamorphic rocks of a great quantity of minerals, metals and nonmetals such as iron, manganese, emeralds, quartz, granites and different types of ornamental stones. The chart below shows the main occurrences of minerals in the Brumadian underground and their corresponding percentages. In geochronology studies it was verified that the oldest rock formations of South America, with the age of 3.4 to 3.5 billion years, are between the municipalities Brumado municipality and Vitória da Conquista municipality. In the geological scale, the soil is from the Paleoproterozoic Age or the Lower Proterozoic Age, equivalent to 1.6 and 2.5 Gigaannum. It was at this age that the oldest rocks and the richest soils in any and every type of ore were formed. This explains why Das Éguas Saw is so rich in minerals. In addition to magnesite, Brumadian soil contains all these minerals already mentioned above, which leads us to conclude that it is one of the richest soils in Brazil and one of the oldest in the world, making it one of the most studied by geologists.

=== Climate ===
The predominant climate in Brumado is the tropical steppe, making a transition with the semi-arid climate, classified as BSh (hot and dry), according to Wladimir Köppen and Rudolf Geiger, however, there are much lower temperatures at the top of the hills, always citing as an example the Das Éguas Saw and Pedra Preta Hill, one of the highest points of this mountain range. The rainy season is concentrated between October and January, with a difference of 128 mm between the driest month, August and the rainier month, of December. The rest of the year, the rains are scarce. The average temperature is 23.8 °C, with an average annual rainfall of 590 to 600 mm. same with the scarcity of rainfall, the city already suffered with excesses, as in 1968, when the Do Antônio River suffered a great flood at the point of water reaching the center of the city, after passing over the bridge of the São Félix neighborhood, which Was caught. Other floods occurred in 1982 and 1992. It also suffered major droughts, as in 1998. The months of January of the years of 2015 and 2016 were considered "good of rain", registering 350 mm and 530 mm, respectively, the latter almost reaching the annual average. The highest accumulated of that month happened in 1985, when it was registered more than 1 100 mm. In the table below, one can more accurately understand the climatic effects in the municipality in a normal year.

Climate data for Brumado
Month	Jan	Feb	Mar	Apr	May	Jun	Jul	Aug	Sep	Oct	Nov	Dec	Year
Mean daily maximum °C (°F)	30.2 (86.4)	30.6 (87.1)	30.2 (86.4)	29.5 (85.1)	28.5 (83.3)	28.8 (83.8)	22.4 (72.3)	28.7 (83.7)	30.7 (87.3)	31.6 (88.9)	30.7 (87.3)	29.9 (85.8)	29.3 (84.8)
Daily mean °C (°F)	19.4 (66.9)	19.4 (66.9)	19.5 (67.1)	18.8 (65.8)	17.2 (63.0)	15.8 (60.4)	15.1 (59.2)	15.7 (60.3)	17.4 (63.3)	19.0 (66.2)	19.4 (66.9)	19.4 (66.9)	18.0 (64.4)
Average precipitation mm (inches)	78 (3.1)	72 (2.8)	43 (1.7)	42 (1.7)	07 (0.3)	04 (0.2)	03 (0.1)	13 (0.5)	08 (0.3)	43 (1.7)	122 (4.8)	131 (5.2)	566 (22.4)
Source: Climate

== Ecology and environment ==
=== Fauna and flora ===
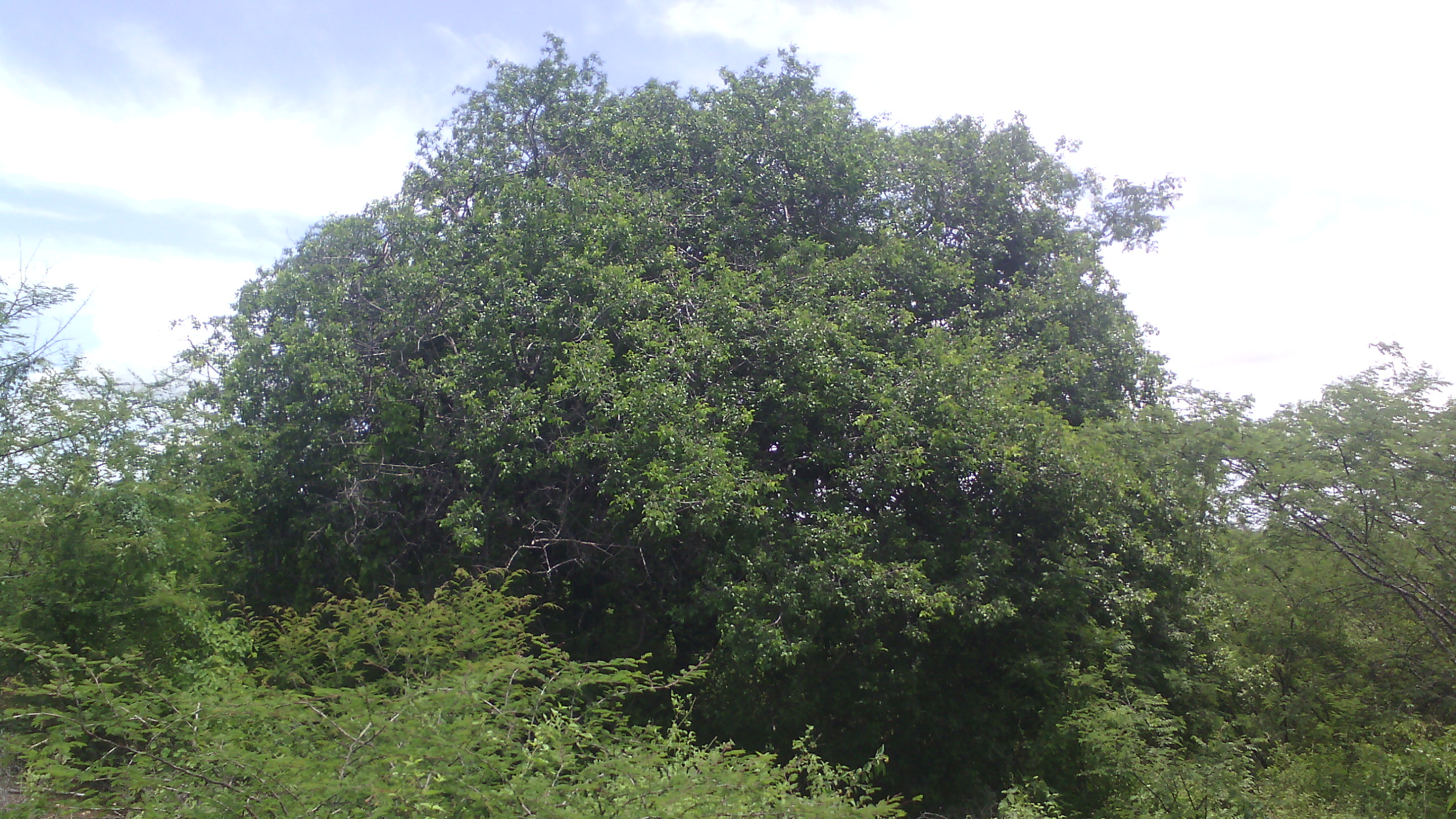
Umbuzeiro, tree of the umbu fruit.

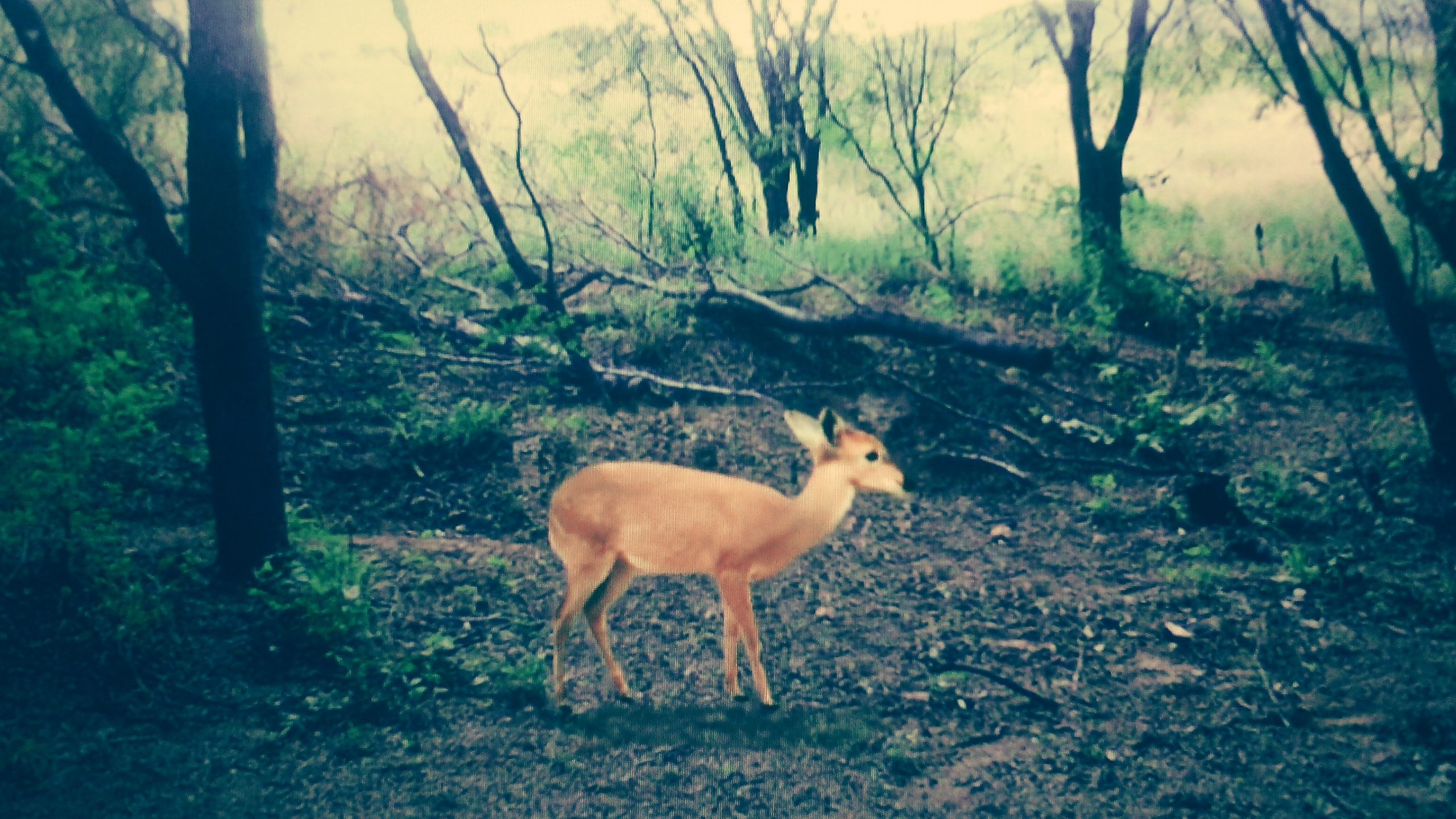
Deer of Caatinga.

Along the municipality, there are four types of vegetation existing in all Brazilian territorial extent: Ciliar Forest, Cerrado, Rupestre Field and Caatinga, which is the predominant vegetation. In the ridges of the hills and mountains, such as Das Éguas Saw and of Pedra Preta Hill, and on the banks of the rivers are closed and small tropical forests, called "generals". Campos rupestres (in English Rupestrian field), typical vegetation of montane and higmontanes environments, occur at altitudes above 900 m, as is the case again in the Das Éguas Saw and Da Pedra Preta Hill; Is characterized by the predominance of shrubs and/or herbaceous plants, precisely in the mountainous summits of the mountains.

The species occurring in the Caatinga are very diversified, some with important commercial and ecological value, such as aroeira (Astronium urundeuva) and braúna, or baraúna (Schinopsis brasiliensis), angico and black angico (Anadenanthera macrocarpa) and umbuzeiro (Spondias tuberosa), one of the which is protected by Municipal Law No. 1030 of 1992. Other notable species are the juazeiro and jatobá, and other species: cassutinga (Caesalpinia microphylla), black maria (Vitex sp.), umburana or northeastern cumaru (Amburana cearensis), white jurema (Mimosa sp.), among many other creeping and shrub plant.

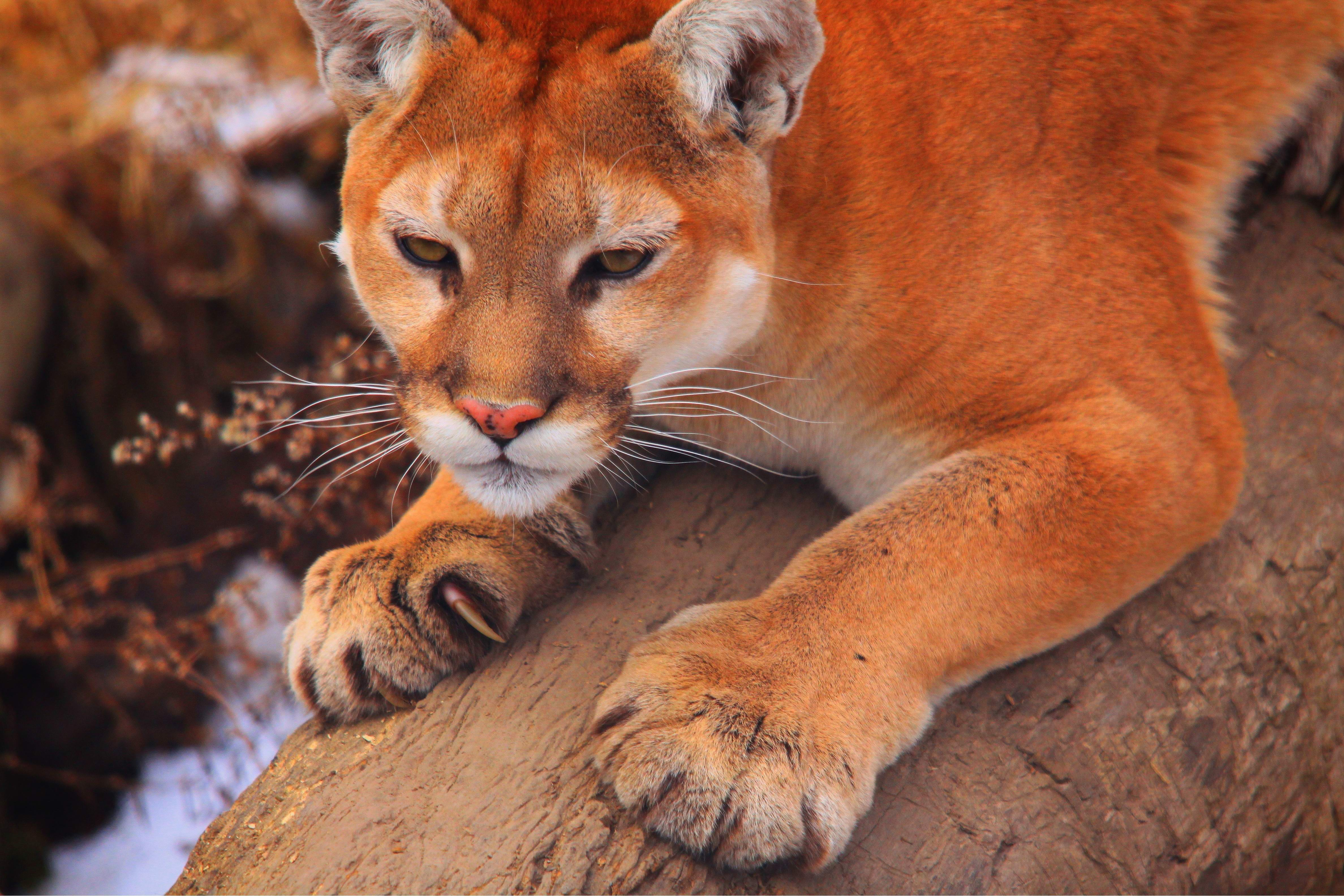
Puma concolor, The largest cat in the region.

Although the municipality has small forest islands called Riparian Forests, often located on the banks of the rivers and streams of the region, the fauna is composed of animals adapted to the Caatinga. Animal biodiversity often ends up having its natural habitat threatened by miners, ranchers and hunters, who aim at territorial expansion, exploitation of natural resources and also illegal trade in animals; Consequently, it ends up entailing a predatory activity unrestrained and without any control with respect to the ecological imbalance that this action can cause.

Brumado has a very wide biodiversity, both vegetal and animal, ranging from small specimens to medium-sized animals threatened with extinction. In the fauna, a reasonable amount of mammals prevails; At least 148 species were cataloged in the interior of the municipality and in the surrounding regions, practically all threatened with extinction. They are distributed between Cerrado and Caatinga; As the highlight is the puma known as suçuarana (or Jaguarundi), being one of the species most endangered and the mocca (Kerodon rupestris), because it is endemic (exclusive of the region). Other examples are: caatinga deer, armadillo or tatupeba (Euphractus), paca (Agouti paca), possum (Conepatus semistriata), fox and raccoon (Dusicyon thous), mallard cat or puma yagouaroundi (Herpailurus yaguaroundi), ferret (Galictis vittatus), coati (Nasua nassua), among others. Disordered hunting of these animals for food consumption is the factor that most contributes to putting animals on the extinction list.

There are also a myriad of birds that are part of the fauna; Most of them are targeted by breeders and collectors, favoring the trafficking of these animals. Among the most common and well-known are: canary, quail, partridge, northeastern cardinal (Paroaria dominicana), Caatinga bacural (Chordeiles pusillus), canan crow (Cyanocorax cyanopogon), mustache(Sporophila lineola), cowgirl-heron (Bubulcus ibis), Great Blue Heron (Casmerdius albus), garrincha (Thryothorus genibarbis), seriema (Cariama cristata), fire sanhaço (Piranga flava), blackbird or coqui (Gnorimopsar chopi ), white anu (Guira guira), black anu (Crotophaga ani), woodpecker (Dryocopus lineatus), crack iron (Saltador simillis), vi-vi or fim-fim (Euphonia clorotica) Caatinga (Aratinga cactorum), sofrê (Icterus jamacaii), canary of the kingdom, canary of the earth, sabiá and many others. Due to size, quail and partridge are hunted constantly inside the municipality. The species of amphibians and reptiles present in the local fauna are small animals, like calango (Tropidurus torquatus). Of these species, the green calango (Ameiva ameiva) is the most commonly seen because it has no commercial value, is not edible, nor is venomous. The teiú (Tupinambis merianae) and the armadillo are well-hunted animals. The best-known snake species are rattlesnake (Crotalus durissus) and jararaca (Bothrops jararaca), both are venomous.

== Demography ==
In the 2010 census, the population was 64,602, of which 31,747 were men and 32,855 were women. The urban resident population was 45 131 inhabitants and in the rural area, 19 471. With an area of 2 207,612 square kilometers, the headquarters area occupying 2 174 square kilometers, its population density is 29.01 inhabitants per square kilometer. See below the evolution of population growth, according to the City Hall.

Population growth
Year	Male population	Female population	Urban	Rural	Total	Urbanization rate	Ruralization rate	Ref.
1970	18 808	19 496	16 586	21 718	38 304	43,30	56,70	
1980	22 857	23 900	25 728	21 029	46 757	55,02	44,98	
1990	28 062	29 114	36 013	21 163	57 176	65,99	37,01	
2000	30 398	31 236	40 673	20 961	61 634	65,99	34,01	
2007	30 587	31 794	42 984	18 921	62 281	68,91	30,33	
2010	31 747	32 855	45 131	19 471	64 602	69,87	30,13	

Between 1970 and 2016, the population had an increase of 31 169 inhabitants.

=== Religion ===
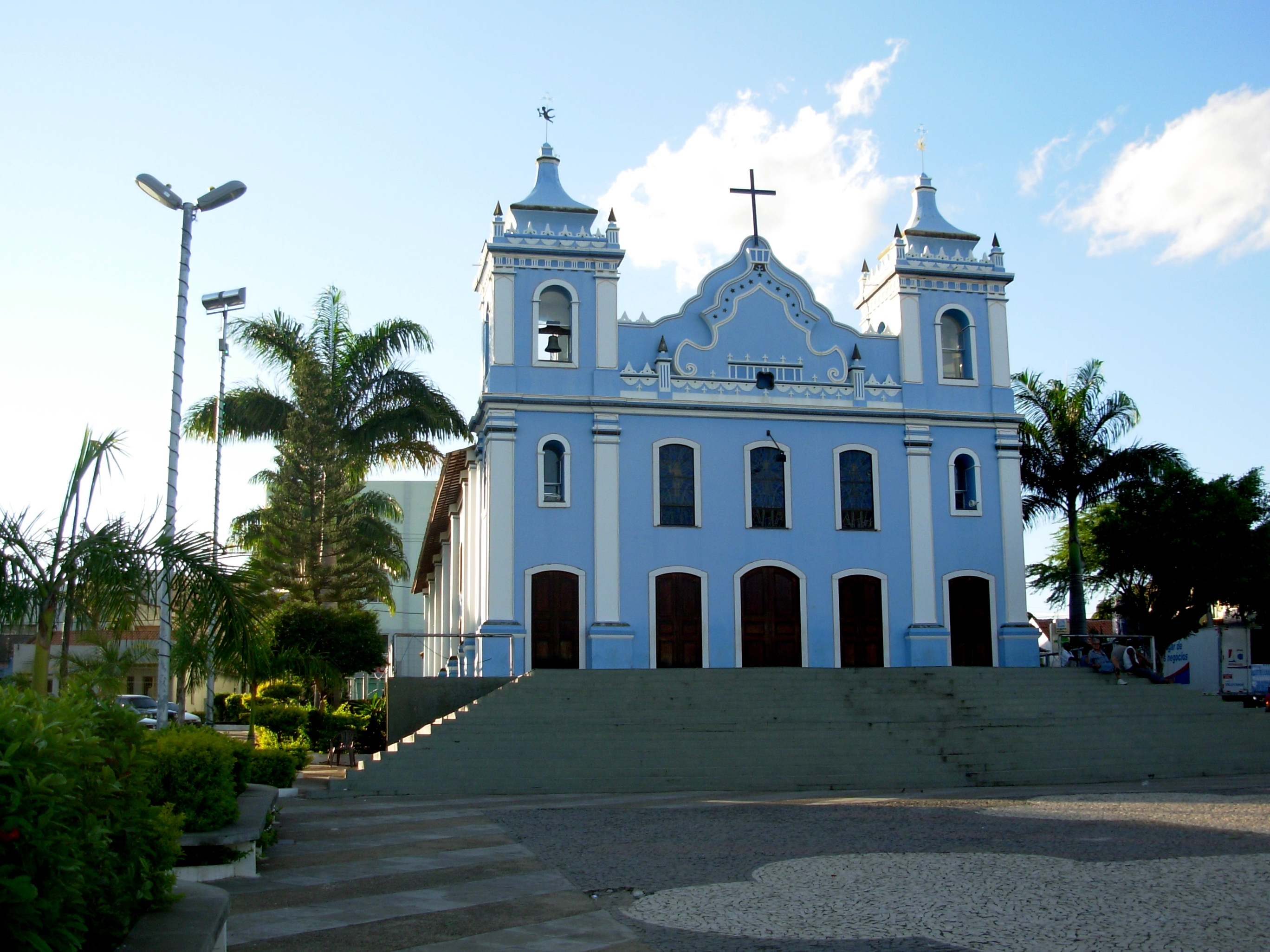
Mother church.

Bahia is a very culturally diverse state and when it comes to religion it could not be different. Nevertheless, many who attend catholic cults also attend cults of religions of African matrices, such as umbanda and candomblé. In Brazil, all who are baptized in the Catholic Church are considered Catholic, even if they practice another religion.

In Brumado, in 2012, according to data from the IBGE, 50 869 people professed Catholicism, 7 422 identified themselves as evangelicals and 994 people identified themselves as spiritists. Of those who professed umbanda or candomblé, they were not even mentioned; But this does not mean that religions of African matrices are not present. There are no numbers on these religions in Brumado, but they do exist, and there is information in the city that is the largest center of candomblé in the world, in the shape of a castle.

For Catholics, they have the traditional processions, such as the procession of St. Sebastian, patron saint of the city. Since 1960, every January 20, Catholic faithful have celebrated St. Sebastian's Day, walking several streets in the city center. It is also celebrated the Day of Santa Rita, with processions. Many other religious manifestations are held, mostly by Catholics and sympathizers. For evangelicals, the greatest festive religious event is the March for Jesus, which usually takes place in September. Many evangelicals gather in the center of the city to fraternize with their brothers to the sound of gospel music. Also on Evangelical Day, June 11, which coincides with the date of Brumado's birthday, supporters celebrate in a double dose, reconciling the dates to the two celebrations, with musical shows

== Politics and administration ==
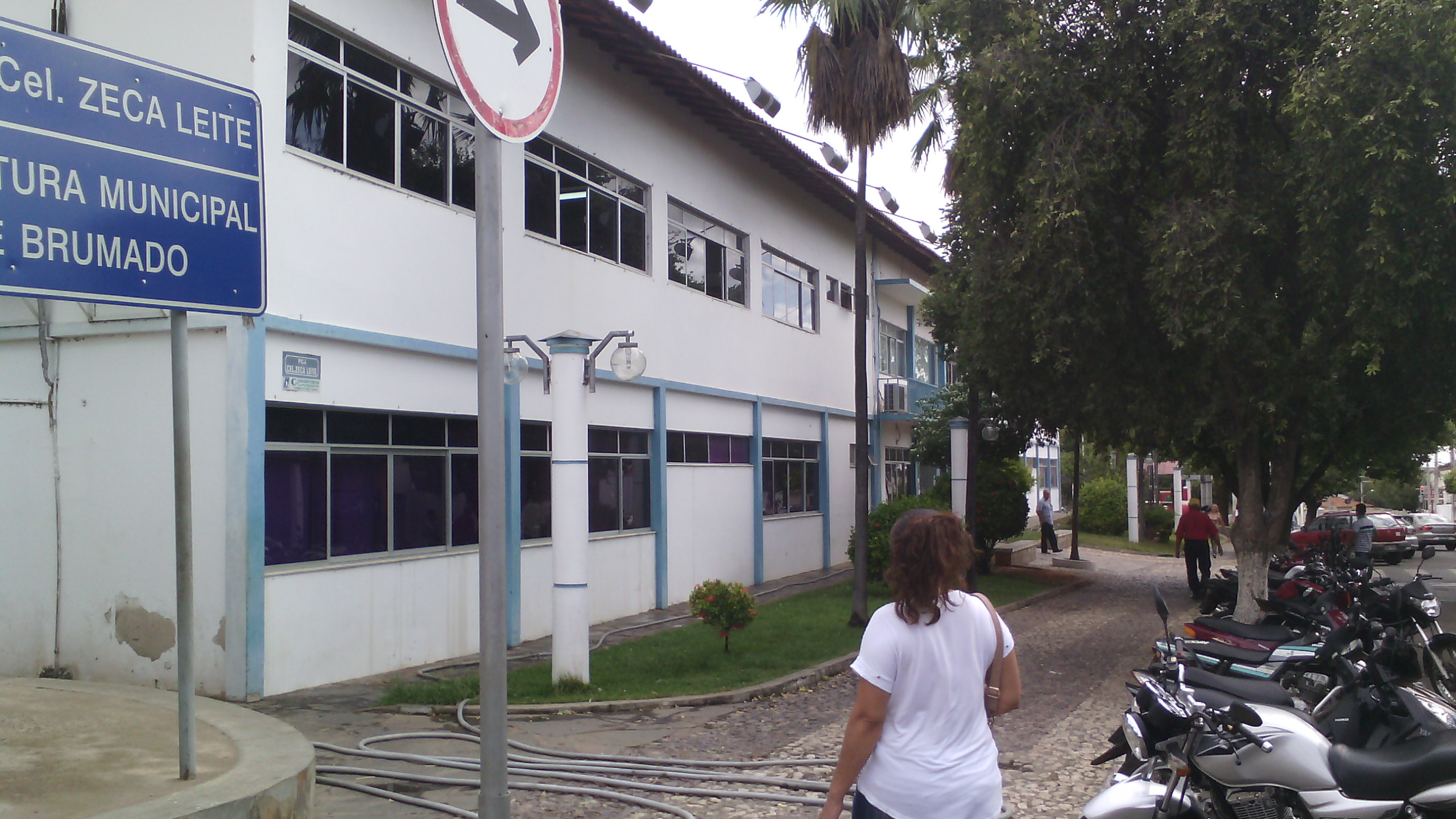
Current City Hall.

According to the Brazilian Constitution of 1988, Brumado is part of a presidential republic, based on the Democratic government of the United States model. The municipal administration is in charge of the Executive Branch and the Legislative Branch. Until 1930, the Brazilian municipalities were governed by the mayor of the corresponding municipality, called intendants or executive agents. After the Revolution of 1930, the municipal powers were divided between executive and legislative. In 1877, the provincial deputy Marcolino Moura elaborated a project calling for the political emancipation of Brumado, then called Bom Jesus dos Meiras. Brumado, then, emancipated himself from Caetité at the time of coronelism, on June 11 of that year. The city council was created on January 13 of the following year, when Colonel Exupério Pinheiro Canguçu, the fourth and last lord of Sobrado do Brejo, became the first intendant.

Currently Brumado is part of the 90th electoral zone of Bahia with more than 66 061 voters, counting with the voters of the municipalities of Aracatu and Malhada de Pedras, of which 47 845 are in Brumado. The legislative chamber is composed of 13 councilors elected from among the 72 candidates who ran in the 2012 elections. To better serve the electorate, the new headquarters of the electoral forum was inaugurated in 2013.

== Subdivisions ==
The Brumado Municipality is composed of three districts: Ubiraçaba, Itaquaraí and Cristalândia; And more than 30 neighborhoods, as Apertar do Morro I and II, Centro, Cidade das Esmeraldas, Feliciano Pereira Santos, Jardim de Alá, Malhada Branca, Santa Tereza, São Félix, São José, São Sebastião, Tanque do Abaeté, Baraúnas, Dr. Juracy, Esconso, Flores, Ginásio Industrial, Centenário, Jardim Brasil, Maria José Viana, Mercado, Nobre, Norberto Marinho, Novo Brumado, Olhos d’Àgua, Parque Alvorada, Rodoviário, Vila Presidente Vargas, Brisas I, II, III and IV and São Jorge.

== Economy ==
Trade is very developed, and the city has seven banking institutions: Itaú Bank, Bradesco Bank, Do Nordeste Bank, Do Brasil Bank, Caixa Bank, Sicoob Bank and Do Povo Bank. From the discovery of the mines of magnesite and mineral talc, the city began to develop, and with that the commerce was strengthened.

=== Primary sector ===
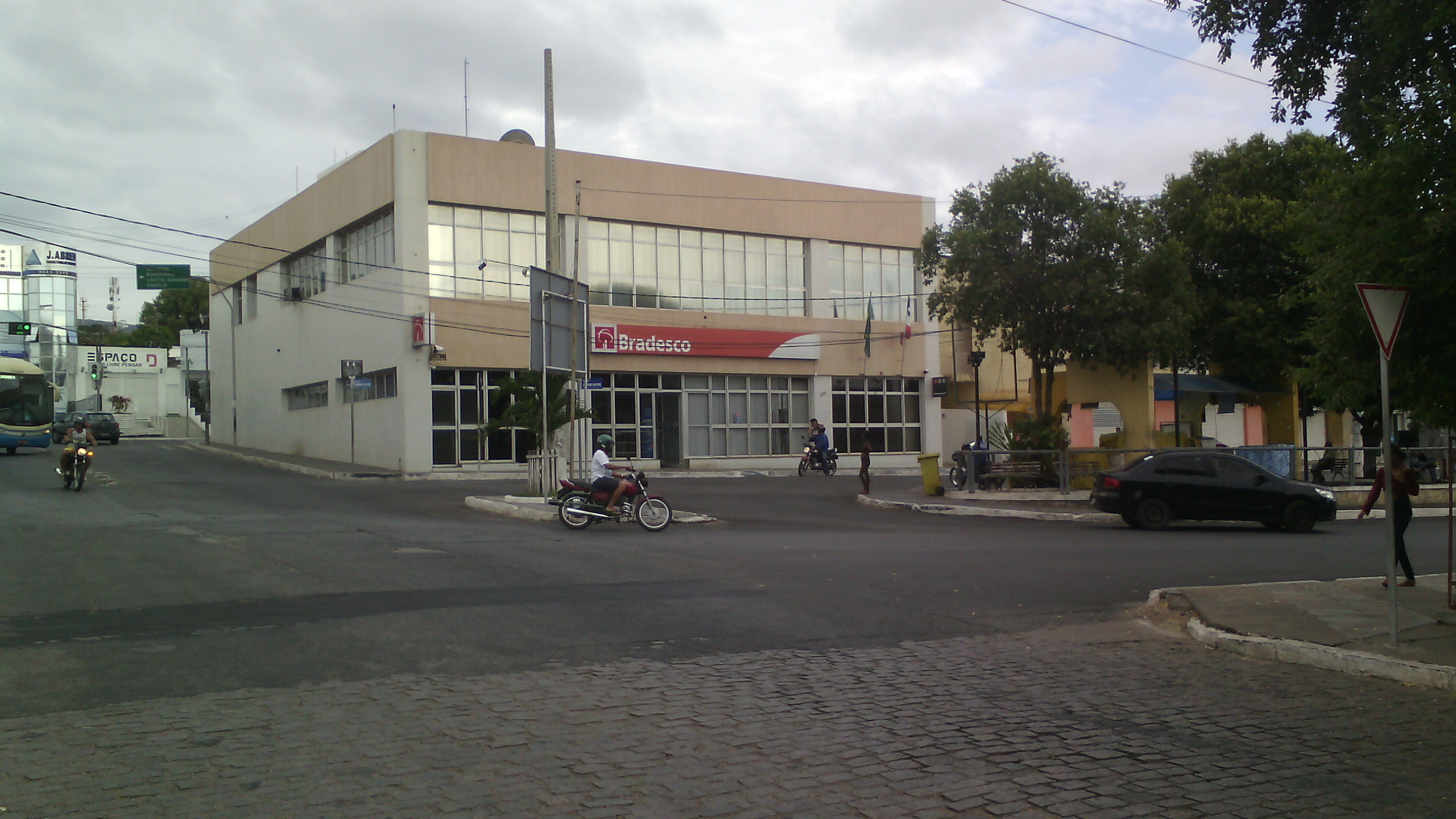
Bradesco Bank In the Armindo Azevedo Square, downtown.

The primary sector, which encompasses extractive, livestock and agricultural activities, is the sector with the lowest participation in the Gross Domestic Product (GDP) of the municipality. It is not such a strong economic base. In 2006, the Superintendency of Economic and Social Studies of Bahia (SEI) published data, where agriculture and cattle raising appeared in that year with only 5.04% of the municipal GDP. Although this sector has a minimal contribution, it can highlight some important activities. In agriculture, crops such as cotton stand out, with 800 hectares planted and harvested; Beans with 2 000 hectares planted and harvested; ricinus or mamona, 200 hectares planted and harvested; watermelon 350 hectares, planted and harvested; And umbu, which is cultivated naturally, without human intervention, for being native, therefore, present in all extension of the municipality. Other low-productivity crops are: mango, with 25 hectares planted and harvested, and coconut-bay with 20 hectares planted and harvested. These data are from the Brazilian Institute of Geography and Statistics (IBGE) in 2014.

In livestock, cattle with 45 105 heads and galiform with a total of 87,654 heads, 37,657 heads of chickens. The goats totaled 29,654 heads; Sheep, 13 534 heads; 16 326 heads, according to IBGE data in 2014. According to the (SEI), in 2006 the industry accounted for 52.31% of the municipality's GDP. This percentage is obtained as a function of mineral extractive activities by the companies Magnesita S.A., Xilolite S.A., Ibar Nordeste S.A. and Cimento Cimpor. Mining is the largest source of wealth in the municipality and generates employment for the majority of the population.

Brumado has rich deposits of magnesite, mineral talc and other minerals such as vermiculite, dolomite, rock crystal and granites of the most varied types. The mineral magnesite is the main product of the mining industry, and of all the mines of this open-air ore existing in the world, Brumado is the third largest. It also has the second largest mineral talc mine in Brazil.

=== Secondary sector ===
The secondary sector is closely linked to the primary sector. Since there are few processing industries in the municipality, much of the primary sector's share is consequently integrated into the secondary sector because of mineral extraction - since the mining industries themselves are part of the two sectors - since they extract Ore and manufacture various products from its own extraction, along with other small industries, including cement and metallurgical industries, contributing to this sector have great potential. However, mineral extraction potential is not added to 5.04% of the primary sector, but to the secondary sector; If this happened, the primary sector would have a higher percentage. The miners, in addition to extracting the primary resources, manufacture some products for direct consumption, such as medicinal talc, cosmetic talc and processed mineral talc for the manufacture of pulp and an infinity of products for consumption in agribusiness. Given that 52.31% of municipal GDP is mixed with extraction and transformation, it is assumed that this percentage is technically divided between the secondary sector and the primary sector.

=== Tertiary sector ===
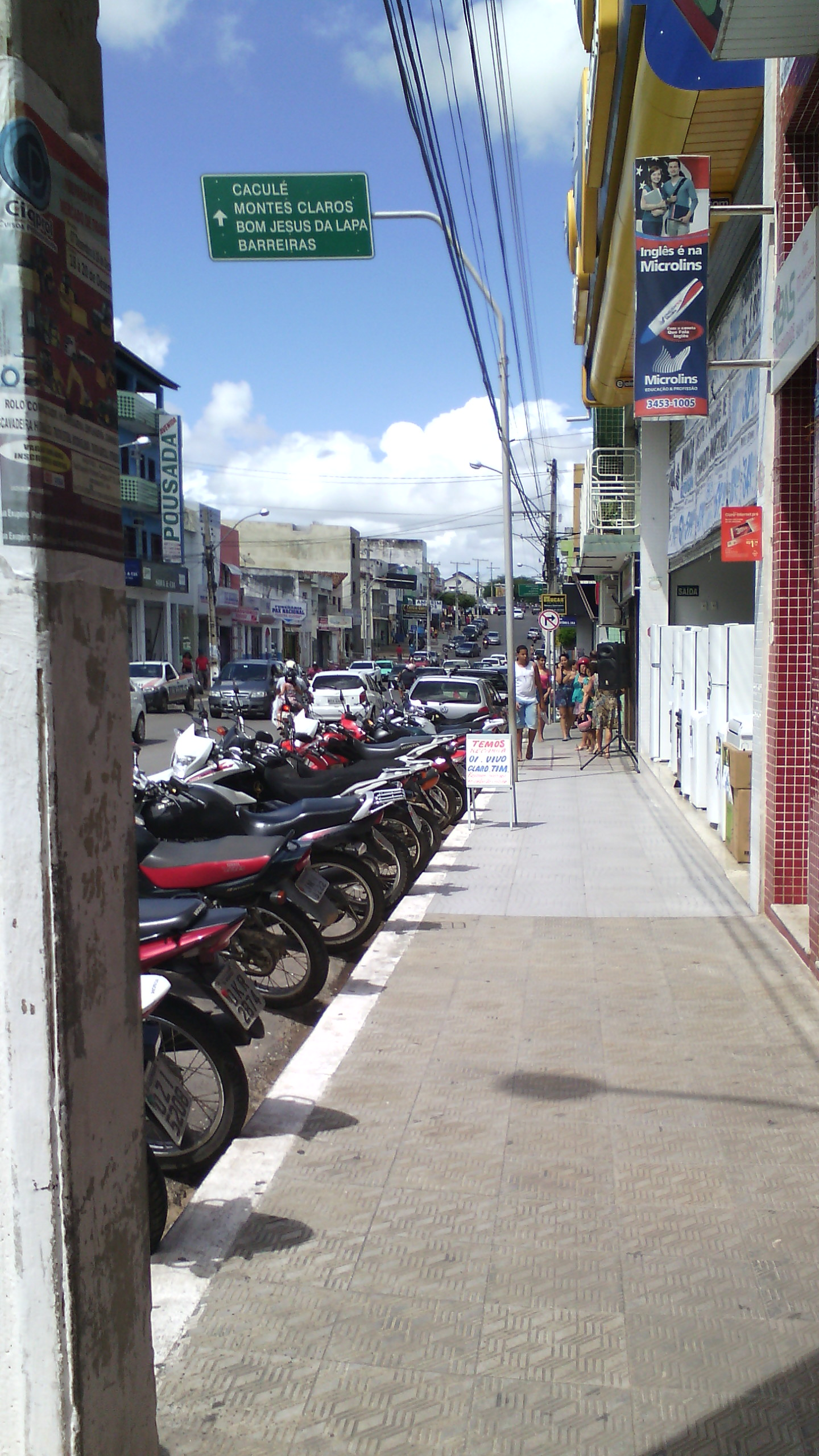
Commercial street in Brumado.

The tertiary sector accounts for 46.24% of the municipality's GDP, the second largest sector contributing to the municipal economy. Trade plays an important role in the economic development of the city. Many of the trades are associated with the City Council of Shopkeepers (CDL). There are more than 1 800 registered companies in every municipality, of which 1 775 are active; Between industries, stores and service providers. These companies employed 12 677 people who, together with all the employed persons, obtained the value of 14 913, in active companies and with due registration (IBGE / data of 2012).

Service companies that performed federal and state works beginning in 2011 employed large numbers of people, including from other municipalities. The largest employers of these companies were Grupo Andrade Gutierrez and VALEC, responsible for the construction of the West-East Integration Railway (FIOL). Until 2013, these companies and their subcontractors played an important role in the local economy, in addition to the miners who invested in their facilities between 2011 and 2015, generating employment for the city's population and also for other neighboring cities.91 In the 2014 and 2015, some companies that provided services to the State had their works suspended several times, which caused financial insecurity for employees and for commerce. Service delivery has a greater share absorbed by the mining industry, either by constant services, or by temporary services resulting from casual investments.

Civil construction has also contributed a lot to economic growth and since 2009, projects have been carried out and, although they slowed down in 2015, the city still sees works being carried out, with expectation of other civil construction projects to be executed. The northern part of the city is the one that has contributed the most to small works, due to the large number of houses built recently.

== Infrastructure ==
=== Cheers ===
The city has only one public hospital, however, counting on several health posts, distributed among the neighborhoods. It has 23 units with coverage of the Unified Health System (SUS) that perform care from small to medium complexity. The good thing is that the city can be considered well served by clinics that perform the most diverse types of tests and specific treatments. In 2012, the municipality had a total of 122 health facilities, 2 of which were state, 34 were municipal and 77 were private.

Sanitation

The sanitation in the city is satisfactory, but although it has a sewage network, the waste is directly thrown into the bed of the Antônio River, which cuts through the city. The Baiana Water and Sanitation Company (Embasa) does not treat the sewage network, and the city has long been channeling the galleries to the Do Atônio River. In 2005, the construction of the Cristalândia dam in the district of the same name began in Rio de Contas after a marked drought between 1998 and 1999. The Brumadian population at that time had the water supply compromised in its totality, being supplied by tank truck. Before the construction of the Cristalândia dam, the city was supplied by the old dam of the Do Antônio River, Which was analyzed belatedly and the water declared as unfit for human consumption, because it contains excess of minerals of various types. Thanks to the attendance of the public power to the appeal of the population, finally the reservoir was built, and the municipality has not suffered any major problems with water supply.

In 2012, the IBGE indicated that in 17 159 homes had treated water. The selective collect is also done. To meet the requirements of Federal Law No. 11445, of January 5, 2007, regulated by Federal Decree 7217 of June 21, 2010 — Which obliges municipalities to create efficient means to eliminate garbage and other waste produced — It is discussed the elaboration of the new sanitation plan for the city.

In the rural zone, sanitation follows what is common in these localities: Water is stored in artesian wells, small lakes. With the government's encouragement, through the Água para Todos Program (Water for All), cisterns are built on the floor for consumption, or boxes of fiber or polyethylene are distributed for the storage of water, for human consumption.

=== Education ===
Brumado has a campus of the State University of Bahia (Uneb), the only public university in the city; Baiano Federal Institute (Ifba), which also encompasses superior courses to its curriculum. The National Industrial Learning Service (SENAI) and the former Luís Eduardo Magalhães Model College (Ceep) offer technical and professional courses, as well as other private technical schools. In 2010, according to the IBGE census, 50 899 people were literate. Check the table below for a portrait of education in the municipality in 2015.

Brumado's education in numbers
Level	Enrollment	Teachers	Schools (total)
Preschool	1 820	92	31
Elementary School	9 399	493	35
Secondary school	2 885	168	4

The higher education institutions present in the municipality, whether with distance or face-to-face education, are:

- Universidade do Estado da Bahia (Uneb);
- Universidade Aberta do Brasil (Uab);
- Universidade Norte do Paraná (Unopar)
- Centro Universitário Internacional (Uninter);
- Universidade Paulista (Unip)

The institutions offering technical education are:

- Federal Institute of Bahia (Ifba);
- Centro Estadual de Educação Profissional (Ceep);
- Serviço Nacional de Aprendizagem Industrial (Senai);
- Colégio Objetivo de Brumado (Cob).

Full-time school

The Municipal Assistance Program for Learning (PMAA), which was financed only with municipal funds, began to be implemented between 2009 and 2011, had a high investment and won the Innovation Award in Educational Management of the National Institute of Studies and Research (INEP). Its objective was to implement full-time schools in the municipality. Approved by 80% of the parents of the students, this initiative, besides contributing to their intensive learning, also helps to keep them away from risks, as contact with drug traffickers, for remaining the rest of the day unoccupied by the streets. Full-time classes have a nine-and-a-half hour period and reconcile morning and afternoon shifts. School reinforcement classes - mainly in mathematics — diversified activities and constant meetings between teachers were responsible for much of the success of the project. A high investment was made to improve the quality of the municipal education network. The number of classrooms doubled, and reform of other schools was carried out. In the enlargement of the network, also were constructed auditoriums, poliesportivas courts with dressing rooms, computer rooms and industrial kitchens. In addition, these schools have four meals a day. Social inclusion is also practiced in these schools, and students with different types of disabilities receive specialized treatment. Although the federal government's incentives are minimal and insufficient, the municipal government has so far sought partnerships and participation in federal education programs such as the National Education Program and the National Literacy Program in the Right Age.

=== Public security ===
The public security in Brumado is in charge of the civil and military police of Bahia, besides the municipal guard. The civil police has a headquarters called the 20th Regional Police Coordination of the Interior (20th Coorpin), and the military police have the 34th Independent Military Police Company (34th CIPM). Although we do not find the percentage of crimes in the municipality, it is verified that in Brumado there are also big problems, such as the police deficit and the lack of financial and social incentives of the state government. This causes the number of armed robberies to increase significantly. The year of 2013 was the most violent of the last ten, registering 20 homicides.

=== Services and communications ===
Human development services and public services, such as paving, construction of galleries for sanitary sewage, etc., are under the responsibility of the Municipal Department of Infrastructure. Essential services such as piped and treated water and electricity are provided by state-owned companies in Bahia. Embasa is responsible for the provision of sewage and water supply services, and the State Electricity Company of Bahia (Coelba) provides public services for the supply of electricity and maintenance of the electricity grid.

The Brumadian population enjoys satisfactory means of communication, as a sign of four cellular operators: Claro, Vivo, TIM and Oi; Several news sites, the main ones are: Brumado Agora, Brumado Notícias, Destque Bahia, Portal Brumado, 97 News; Two radios transmitted in modulated frequency (FM): Alternativa 97.9 and Radio Nova Vida 87.9; And two newspapers in printed and online versions: Tribuna do Sertão and Jornal do Sudoeste; And a bimonthly magazine: Entrevip, also with printed and online versions, focused on the world of fashion.

=== Transportation ===
Transportation services are satisfactory. The city has a circular bus company that makes lines between Neighborhoods and village and also carries out transportation of employees of companies of the city. There is a bus company that does intercity and interstate transportation and tourism trips. Brumado has a road complex that gives access to the cities of Vitória da Conquista (BA-262 highway); Caetité (BR-030 highway); Livramento de Nossa Senhora and Rio de Contas (BA-148 highway) Rail transportation is geared towards ore disposal and is currently carried out by VLI Multimodal S.A railroad, through the old railroad, the Federal Railway Network A.S. (RFFSA S.A.).

The city has a ring road, extension of BR-030 Highway, which allows the diversion of heavy vehicles. It also has the sub-headquarters of the Regional Traffic Circumscription (Ciretran) and State Department of Traffic (Detran), Besides the Department of Transit and Urban Transport of the municipality (DTTU).

== Culture and leisure ==
=== Tourism and events ===
At least until 1998, carnival was one of the most traditional events. The story of this event dates back to 1949, when a group of friends decided to join and go out to streets to toy the revelry of Momo. In 1951, the party started to be held in clubs, taking turns between one and the other. However, in 1998, the year of the great drought, carnival happens sporadically, and one of the city's most popular urban festivity is no longer as traditional as it once was. If we do a search on the carnival of Brumado, we will find more news about the cancellation of the event than the realization of it. Officials claim that the reasons are the lack of funds or the effects of drought. The city has a certain tourist potential developed by the realization of traditional festivities, like St. John and St. Peter. Has a well-structured hotel network. Besides these attractions, those who visit the city can take walks through the Das Éguas Saw, with the permission of the mining companies that are there. Although the city has no tourist tradition, a survey conducted in 2016 by Expedia Brasil, a company specialized in tourism and travel, found that Brumado is one of the 40 small cities in Brazil that deserve to be visited, due to the tourist potential not explored, With highlight to of the Cristalândia Village. Within the territory of the Magnesita Refratários company there are the ruins of Do Brejo loft and Condado Farm, the latter still existing; Both from the early nineteenth century and have a rich historical value, but were not tumbled because they were acquired by the company Magnesita. the natural beauties of the municipality are little publicized, such as the caves Das Éguas Saw and its springs. Cristalândia village is one of the attractions. Below are some points considered tourist:

- Igreja matriz (Mother church);
- Mercado de Artes (Arts market);
- Memorial Municipal (Municipal memorial);
- Fazenda Condado (Condado farm);
- Ruínas do Sobrado do Brejo (Ruins of the Sobrado do Brejo);
- Rio de Contas (De Contas River);
- Serra das Éguas (Das Éguas Saw);
- Praça e anfiteatro Coronel Zeca Leite (Square and amphitheater Coronel Zeca Leite);
- Barragem de Cristalândia (Dam of Cristalândia);
- A Ponte Pênsil (The suspension bridge).

The Bruman culture is diverse and closely linked to the rural roots, which in a way, whether, want or not, has been suffering decadence. Religious festivals such as Saint John, Saint Peter Revelry of kings have been losing strength. Revelry of kings is also a very traditional party in the municipality, but has greater strength in the rural area. Saint Peter, the feast of Saint Sebastian, Bom Jesus and the feast of Our Lady Aparecida are very traditional religious feasts, but the party that has grown a lot is the cavalcade, which happens from north to south of the municipality, either to fraternize with friends and family, or to enjoy shows of bands and artists of sertaneja music.

=== Sports ===
The sports achievements in the city are mostly amateur level, such as Maratoninha (Child marathon), for children up to 12 years, which is held annually on October 12 And football tournaments in the neighborhoods and in the countryside. The most important sporting events in the city are the futsal championships and the Brumado Ecological Race to Rio de Contas. This race is one of the most important cycling competitions in Bahia and is played in several categories, with the participation of athletes from all over the country. The competition is interstate and is recognized by the Federation of Brazilian Cycling and the Brazilian Cycling Confederation, and the score serves to define the national ranking.

The Brunadian futsal is one of the main sports practiced in the city, a sport in which Brumado futsal is four times Bahian champion. Another common sporting event is the capoeira wheels. The athletes are baptized, and graduates, receiving colorful ropes, tied at the waist. These strings correspond to your graduation.

== Holidays ==
There are 15 national holidays in the city, including ten national, three municipal and one state, and one optional point. National holidays are: January 1 (International confraternity), Passion of Christ, April 21 (Tiradentes), May 1 (World Labor Day), Corpus Christi, September 7 (Independence of Brazil), October 12 (Day of Our Lady of Aparecida), November 2 (Day of the Dead), November 15 (Proclamation of the Republic) and December 25 (Christmas). The municipalities holidays are: June 11 (emancipation of the municipality), January 20 (Saint Sebastian's Day, patron of the city) and August 6 (Bom Jesus Day, patron saint of the city). State holiday, only one: July 2 (Independence of Bahia). Optional point: Ash Wednesday (until 2:00 p.m.).
