= List of shipwrecks in July 1881 =

The list of shipwrecks in July 1881 includes ships sunk, foundered, grounded, or otherwise lost during July 1881.

== 1 July ==
List of shipwrecks: 1 July 1881
| Ship | State | Description |
|---|---|---|
| Aurora | (Dominion of Newfoundland) Newfoundland Colony | The schooner was driven ashore and wrecked on the Isle du Bois, in the Strait of Belle Isle. |
| Guide | (Dominion of Newfoundland) Newfoundland Colony | The schooner was driven ashore and wrecked on the Isle du Bois. |
| Jessie | United Kingdom | The pilot smack collided with Saga (Flag unknown) and sank off Start Point, Devon. Her crew were rescued. |
| Lady Maxwell | United Kingdom | The steamship was driven ashore 4 nautical miles (7.4 km) south of St. Bees Head, Cumberland. |
| Several unnamed vessels | United States | The schooners were wrecked by a tornado in Tangier Sound, Chesapeake Bay with the loss of nine lives. |
| Unnamed | (Dominion of Newfoundland) Newfoundland Colony | The schooner was driven ashore and wrecked on the Isle du Bois. |

== 2 July ==
List of shipwrecks: 2 July 1881
| Ship | State | Description |
|---|---|---|
| Daniel Webster | United States | The whaler was crushed by ice and sank in the Arctic Ocean 5 nautical miles (9.3 km; 5.8 mi) south of Point Barrow, Territory of Alaska. |
| Lofna | United Kingdom | The steamship struck rocks at Burntisland, Fife. She was on a voyage from Burntisland to Kronstadt, Russia. She put in to Leith, Lothian in a leaky condition. |

== 3 July ==
List of shipwrecks: 3 July 1881
| Ship | State | Description |
|---|---|---|
| Glen | United Kingdom | The schooner collided with the screw-steamer Alliance (Flag unknown) off St Ives, Cornwall and foundered. Her crew were rescued by Alliance. |

== 4 July ==
List of shipwrecks: 4 July 1881
| Ship | State | Description |
|---|---|---|
| Britannic | United Kingdom | The ocean liner ran aground in fog at Kilmore, County Wexford. Her passengers were evacuated via the ship's lifeboats. She was refloated on 8 July but sprang a leak in her engine room the next day and was beached in Wexford Bay. She was refloated on 14 July and towed to Liverpool. |
| Glen | United Kingdom | The ship collided with Alliance (United Kingdom) and sank off St Ives, Cornwall. Her crew were rescued by Alliance. |

== 5 July ==
List of shipwrecks: 5 July 1881
| Ship | State | Description |
|---|---|---|
| Abraham | Germany | The brig was driven ashore and wrecked at Aracatu, Brazil. She was on a voyage from Havre de Grâce, Seine-Inférieure, France to the Rio Grande. |

== 6 July ==
List of shipwrecks: 6 July 1881
| Ship | State | Description |
|---|---|---|
| James and Harriet | United Kingdom | The Thames barge capsized off Shoeburyness, Essex. Her crew were rescued. She was subsequently beached between Southend Pier and Shoeburyness with the assistance of two smacks. |

== 7 July ==
List of shipwrecks: 7 July 1881
| Ship | State | Description |
|---|---|---|
| Asterope | United Kingdom | The brig struck a rock and was wrecked on the coast of Brazil near the mouth of the Pará River. Her eight crew took to a boat; they were rescued two days later by the steamship Lisbonense (United Kingdom). Asterope was on a voyage from Cardiff, Glamorgan to Pará, Brazil. |
| Eblane | Denmark | The schooner foundered in the North Sea with the loss of a crew member. She was on a voyage from Antwerp, Belgium to Gothenburg, Sweden. |
| Emilie | Norway | The brig was drovem ashore in the Nieuwe Diep. She was on a voyage from the Nieuwe Diep to Sundsvall. She was refloated the next day but consequently foundered. |

== 11 July ==
List of shipwrecks: 11 July 1881
| Ship | State | Description |
|---|---|---|
| Lady Franklin | United States | The schooner sank off Stanwood's Point in the Annisquam River. Her crew were rescued. |

== 12 July ==
List of shipwrecks: 12 July 1881
| Ship | State | Description |
|---|---|---|
| Rio Apa | United Kingdom | The steamship was severely damaged by fire at Bayonne, Basses-Pyrénées. She was on a voyage from Havre de Grâce, Seine-Inférieure to Bayonne. |

== 14 July ==
List of shipwrecks: 14 July 1881
| Ship | State | Description |
|---|---|---|
| Lamar | United Kingdom | The steamship departed from Coronel for Valparaíso, Chile. No further trace, reported overdue. |

== 15 July ==
List of shipwrecks: 15 July 1881
| Ship | State | Description |
|---|---|---|
| Aberdonian | United Kingdom | The ship foundered in a typhoon in the East China Sea with the loss of at least ten of her 24 crew. She was on a voyage from Yantai to Fuzhou, China. |
| Hebe | United Kingdom | The schooner collided with another schooner in the Bristol Channel off Nash Point, Glamorgan. She was on a voyage from Cardiff, Glamorgan to Waterford. She consequently foundered the next day. Her crew were rescued by a schooner. |
| Lamar | Chile | The steamship was sighted off the mouth of the Maule River whilst on a voyage from Coronel to Valparaíso. No further trace, reported missing. |
| Unnamed | China | The junk foundered in the East China Sea with the loss of all but one of those on board. |

== 16 July ==
List of shipwrecks: 16 July 1881
| Ship | State | Description |
|---|---|---|
| Pilliponis | Russia | The steamship caught fire in the Black Sea and was beached at "Cape Tatali". |
| Sophie | United Kingdom | The brig was driven ashore at Narva, Russia. Her crew were rescued. |
| Stralsund | Germany) | The barque collided with the steamship Avlona (United Kingdom) in the Saint Lawrence River and sank. Stralsund was on a voyage from Montreal, Quebec, Canada to London, United Kingdom. |

== 17 July ==
List of shipwrecks: 17 July 1881
| Ship | State | Description |
|---|---|---|
| Annie S. Hall | United Kingdom | The ship foundered in a typhoon in the East China Sea. Her crew survived. |
| Camerata | United Kingdom | The steamship struck rocks and ran aground at Cette, Hérault, France. |
| Jafet II | Austria-Hungary | The barque was driven ashore 2 1/4 nautical miles (4.2 km) south of the South Stack, Anglesey, United Kingdom. She was on a voyage from Pensacola, Florida, United States to Liverpool, Lancashire, United Kingdom. She was later refloated and towed in to Holyhead, Anglesey. |

== 18 July ==
List of shipwrecks: 18 July 1881
| Ship | State | Description |
|---|---|---|
| Klarina Harmina | Netherlands | The brigantine ran aground near Aracaju, Brazil. She was on a voyage from Aracaju to New York, United States. She was refloated and put back to Aracaju in a leaky condition . |

== 20 July ==
List of shipwrecks: 20 July 1881
| Ship | State | Description |
|---|---|---|
| Laleham | United Kingdom | The steamship ran aground in the Suez Canal. She was on a voyage from Calcutta, India to Dunkirk, Nord, France. |
| Loch Rannoch | United Kingdom | The steamship arrived at Bombay, India on fire. She was scuttled the next day. She was refloated on 12 August. |
| Loch Ryan | United Kingdom | The ship was driven ashore and wrecked 4 nautical miles (7.4 km) south east of Thurso, Caithness. Her crew were rescued. She was on a voyage from Castlehill, Scotland to Alloa, Clackmannanshire. |
| Servitor | United Kingdom | The ketch sank off the mouth of the River Cuckmere with the loss of one of her four crew. Survivors were rescued by the Coastguard. She was on a voyage from Newhaven to Lewes, Sussex. |
| Unnamed | United Kingdom | The yacht capsized in the Gare Loch with the loss of four lives. |

== 21 July ==
List of shipwrecks: 21 July 1881
| Ship | State | Description |
|---|---|---|
| Albertine | United Kingdom | The ship ran aground at Greenock, Renfrewshire. She was on a voyage from Quebec City, Canada to Greenock. |
| Britomart | United Kingdom | The barque was driven ashore at Cerro Azul, Peru. She was declared a total loss. |
| Henriette | Germany | The ship departed from Hamburg for Guaymas, Mexico. No further trace, reported missing. |

== 25 July ==
List of shipwrecks: 25 July 1881
| Ship | State | Description |
|---|---|---|
| Brighton | United Kingdom | The barque was driven ashore and wrecked at East London, Cape Colony with some loss of life. |
| Clymping | United Kingdom | The barque was driven ashore and wrecked at East London with some loss of life. |
| Henri IV | France | The steamship ran aground at Havre de Grâce, Seine-Inférieure. She was on a voyage from Brazil to Havre de Grâce. She was later refloated and found to be severely leaky |

== 26 July ==
List of shipwrecks: 26 July 1881
| Ship | State | Description |
|---|---|---|
| Sarah Douglas | United Kingdom | The ship was abandoned in the Atlantic Ocean. Her crew were rescued. She was on a voyage from Liverpool, Lancashire to Savannah, Georgia, United States. |
| Ulysses | (United Kingdom of Great Britain and Ireland) Guernsey | The schooner struck rocks and sank at Saint Sampsons. |
| Three unnamed vessels | Flags unknown | Thirty people died when three sailing vessels sank during a "terrific gale" at East London, Cape Colony. |

== 27 July ==
List of shipwrecks: 27 July 1881
| Ship | State | Description |
|---|---|---|
| Admiral | United Kingdom | The sloop sprang a leak and foundered in the North Sea off Souter Point, Northumberland. Her crew were rescued. She was on a voyage from Sunderland, County Durham to Hebburn-on-Tyne, Northumberland. |
| Mirzapore | United Kingdom | The steamship ran aground in the Suez Canal. She was on a voyage from London to Shanghai, China. |
| Strickland | United Kingdom | The ship ran aground at Pernambuco, Brazil and developed a severe leak. |

== 28 July ==
List of shipwrecks: 28 July 1881
| Ship | State | Description |
|---|---|---|
| Calcutta | United States | The full-rigged ship was wrecked south west of the mouth of the Xora River, Cape Colony with the loss of thirteen of her sixteen crew. |
| Nordstjernan | (flag) Norway | The steamship was wrecked at Knivskjærodden, near Nordkapp, and sank. All on board were rescued. |

== 30 July ==
List of shipwrecks: 30 July 1881
| Ship | State | Description |
|---|---|---|
| Guy Cunningham | United States | The fishing schooner departed from Gloucester, Massachusetts. No further trace, presumed foundered with the loss of all fourteen crew. |

== 31 July ==
List of shipwrecks: 31 July 1881
| Ship | State | Description |
|---|---|---|
| Dunoon Castle | United Kingdom | The paddle steamer ran aground in the Clyde at Greenock, Renfrewshire with the loss of her captain. Subsequently refloated and taken in to Glasgow, Renfrewshire. |
| Morning Groves | United Kingdom | The fishing boat was run down and sunk off Queenborough, Kent. |

== Unknown date ==
List of shipwrecks: Unknown date in July 1881
| Ship | State | Description |
|---|---|---|
| Annie D. Merritt | United States | The ship was driven ashore on the coast of Maryland. |
| Arche d'Alliance | France | The lugger sank in the North Sea off North Sunderland, Berwickshire, United Kingdom. Her crew survived. |
| Argo | United Kingdom | The schooner was driven ashore at Porth Neigwl, Caernarfonshire. Her crew survived. She was on a voyage from Liverpool, Lancashire to Falmouth, Cornwall. |
| Atlantic | United Kingdom | The steamship ran aground at the entrance to the Gulf of Smyrna. She was refloated on 24 July and resumed her voyage. |
| Barend | Netherlands | The brigantine was driven ashore 6 nautical miles (11 km) south of Figueira da Foz, Portugal with the loss of two of her crew. She was on a voyage from Candia, Ottoman Crete to Rouen, Seine-Inférieure, France. She subsequently broke up. |
| Bessie Rowe | United Kingdom | The schooner was driven ashore. She was on a voyage from Hamburg, Germany to Middlesbrough, Yorkshire. She was refloated and taken in to Cuxhaven, Germany in a leaky condition. |
| Clarence | United Kingdom | The steamship struck a sunken pile and sank at Liverpool. She was on a voyage from Workington, Cumberland to Liverpool. |
| Dantzic | United Kingdom | The schooner was driven ashore on "Goat Island", Outer Hebrides and severely damaged. She was refloated on 12 July. |
| Edith Brooks | United Kingdom | The brig foundered near Sulymah, Sierra Leone on or before 28 July. Her crew were rescued. |
| Epjuht | Flag unknown | The ship was wrecked at "Amherst". Her crew were rescued. |
| Eureka | United Kingdom | The schooner was wrecked in the White Sea at Sweet Nose, Russia before 11 July. Her crew were rescued by the steamship T. E. Forster (United Kingdom). |
| Germania | Germany | The schooner was driven ashore at Tangier, Morocco. She was on a voyage from Kronstadt, Russia to Genoa, Italy. |
| Glenrosa | United Kingdom | The steamship was driven ashore on Skagen, Denmark. She was on a voyage from Leith, Lothian to Riga, Russia. She was later refloated with assistance and taken in to Copenhagen, Denmark for repairs. |
| Grislehamn | Sweden | The barque was driven ashore on Saltholmen, Denmark. She was on a voyage from a Finnish port to and English port. |
| Harald, and Selma | Denmark (Russian Empire) Grand Duchy of Finland | The steamships collided off "Trindelin". Selma sank. Her crew survived. Harald was severely damaged. She was on a voyage from Copenhagen to New York, United States. She put back to Copenhagen. |
| Holmbrook | United Kingdom | The steamship was driven ashore at Rosemullion Head, Cornwall. Her crew were rescued. She was on a voyage from Caen, Calvados, France to Newport, Monmouthshire. Holmbrook was refloated on 18 July and beached at Falmouth. |
| Ida | United Kingdom | The brigantine was driven ashore. She was on a voyage from Bahia to Aracaju, Brazil. She was refloated and put in to Chrislovas in a leaky condition. |
| Isabel | Spain | The ship was driven ashore at La Frontera, Tenerife, Canary Islands. |
| Isabella | Russia | The tug collided with the steamship Madeleine and sank at Kronstadt. |
| Italia | United Kingdom | The steamship ran aground at Barrow-in-Furness, Lancashire. She was on a voyage from Avonmouth, Somerset to Barrow-in-Furness. |
| John Cobbold | United Kingdom | The barque was driven ashore at Kingsdown, Kent. She was on a voyage from Ipswich, Suffolk to Porto, Portugal. |
| Leversons | United Kingdom | The steamship ran aground on the Filsand, in the Baltic Sea and was severely damaged. She was on a voyage from Kronstadt to Riga. |
| Mary Jane | United Kingdom | The schooner was driven ashore and wrecked near Vlissingen, Zeeland. She was on a voyage from Antwerp, Belgium to Ipswich, Suffolk. |
| Minnie | (United Kingdom of Great Britain and Ireland) Isle of Man | The fishing lugger struck the Navestone Rock, in the North Sea off the coast of Northumberland, and sank. Her crew survived. |
| Morgan Richards | United Kingdom | The steamship ran into the paddle steamer Isabel la Catolica (Spanish Navy) at Cartagena, Spain and was damaged, breaking her crankshaft. |
| Nathalia | Sweden | The schooner collided with the full-rigged ship Norma (Norway) and sank. Her crew survived. Nathalia was on a voyage from Hartlepool, County Durham, United Kingdom to Aarhus, Denmark. |
| Nordstjern | Germany | The schooner at "Sondre Rosse". She was on a voyage from Helsinki, Grand Duchy of Finland to Vegesack. She was refloated and put in to Copenhagen. |
| Pleiades | United Kingdom | The brig was wrecked on the Hinder Bank, in the North Sea off the coast of Zeeland, Netherlands. Her crew were rescued. She was on a voyage from Newcastle upon Tyne, Northumberland to Rotterdam, South Holland, Netherlands. |
| Queen of the Fleet | United Kingdom | The fishing trawler was driven ashore at Thisted, Denmark. |
| Republic | United States | The full-rigged ship was driven ashore near Calais, France. She was on a voyage from Melbourne, Victoria to Calais. |
| Resource | Norway | The brig ran aground on the North Bull, in the Irish Sea off the coast of County Dublin, United Kingdom. She was on a voyage from Quebec City, Canada to Drogheda, County Louth, United Kingdom. She was refloated with assistance on 17 July and taken in to Drogheda. |
| S. and E. A. Charnley | United Kingdom | The schooner was driven ashore and wrecked 2 nautical miles (3.7 km) south of the South Stack, Anglesey. Her crew were rescued. She was on a voyage from Birkenhead, Cheshire to London. |
| Scots Grey | United Kingdom | The steamship ran aground in the Bute Channel. |
| Solid | German Empire | The schooner ran aground near "Ijusut", Russia. She was later refloated with assistance and taken in to Nicholaieff, Russia, where she had arrived by 22 July. |
| Spurn | United Kingdom | The steam trawler struck rocks and was beached at Sandend, Aberdeenshire. |
| St. Pierre | France | The barque was wrecked in the Torres Strait. |
| Sylph | United Kingdom | The brigantine sprang a leak and was beached at Cowes, Isle of Wight. She was on a voyage from Middlesbrough to Lydney, Gloucestershire. Following repairs, she was refloated and resumed her voyage. |
| Trocadero | United Kingdom | The steamship was driven ashore at Fahludd, Gotland, Sweden. She was on a voyage from Stettin to Söderhamn, Sweden. |
| Veranda | United Kingdom | The full-rigged ship ran aground at "Sondre Ross". She was on a voyage from Lerwick, Shetland Islands to Stettin, Germany. She was refloated. |
