= Rio do Antônio =

- Municipality
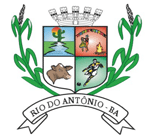
- Flag Coat of arms

- Location in Brazil
- Coordinates: 14°24′S 42°05′W
- Country: Brazil
- Region: Nordeste
- State: Bahia

Population (2020)
  - Total: 15,448
- Time zone: UTC−3 (BRT)

Rio do Antônio is a municipality in the state of Bahia in the North-East region of Brazil.

== See also ==
- List of municipalities in Bahia
