= Dom Basílio =

Municipality of Bahia, Brazil

- Municipality
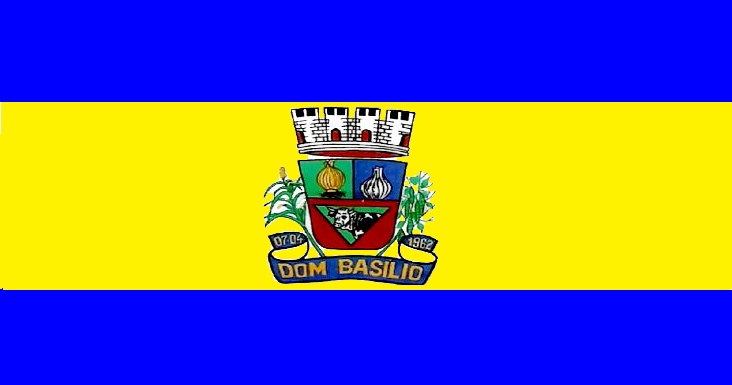
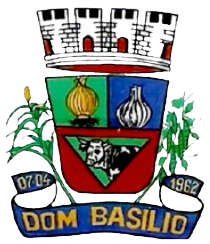
- Flag Coat of arms

- Location in Brazil
- Coordinates: 13°44′S 41°46′W
- Country: Brazil
- Region: Nordeste
- State: Bahia

Government
  - Mayor: Roberval de Cassia Meira

Area
  - Total: 266 sq mi (688 km^{2})
- Elevation: 1,516 ft (462 m)

Population (2020)
  - Total: 12,240
- Time zone: UTC−3 (BRT)
- Website: http://www.dombasilio.ba.gov.br/

Dom Basílio is a municipality in the state of Bahia in the North-East region of Brazil.

The main economic activity in this municipality is agriculture.

== See also ==
- List of municipalities in Bahia
