= Tanhaçu =

Coordinates: 14°01′S 41°17′W

- Municipality
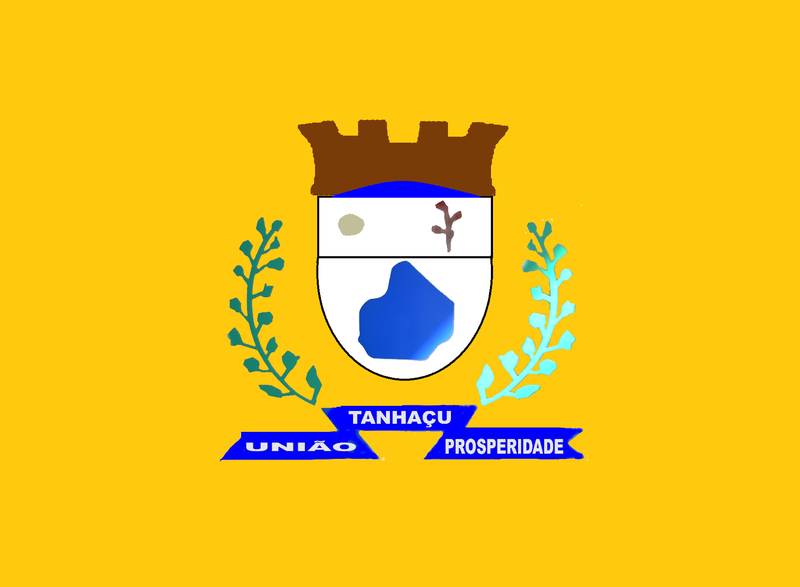
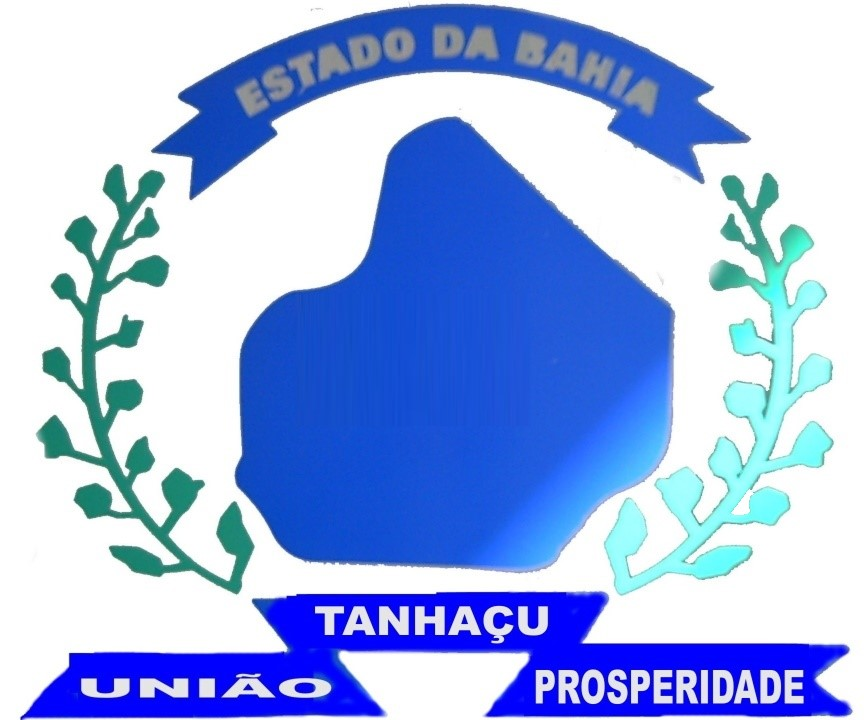
- Flag Coat of arms
- Interactive map of Tanhaçu
- Country: Brazil
- Region: Nordeste
- State: Bahia

Population (2020)
  - Total: 20,393
- Time zone: UTC−3 (BRT)

Tanhaçu is a municipality in the state of Bahia in the North-East region of Brazil.

== See also ==
- List of municipalities in Bahia
