= Caetité =

Municipality of Bahia, Brazil

- Municipality
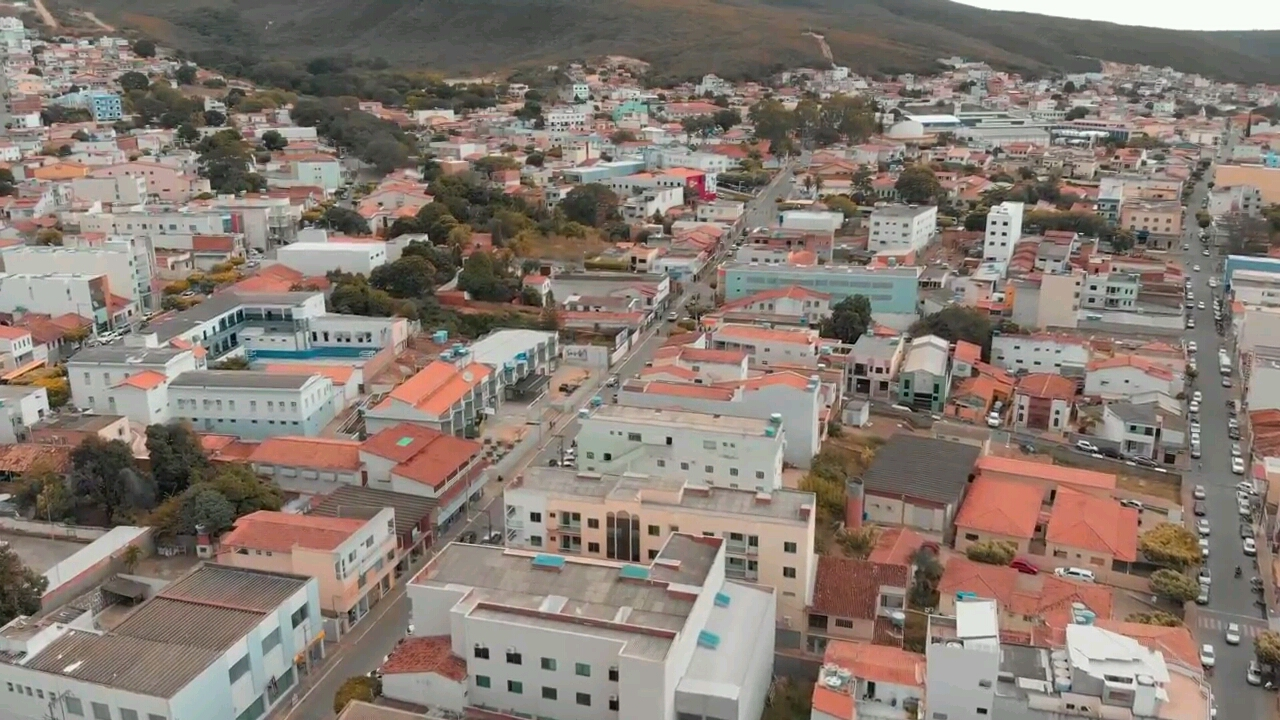
- Aerial view of Caetité

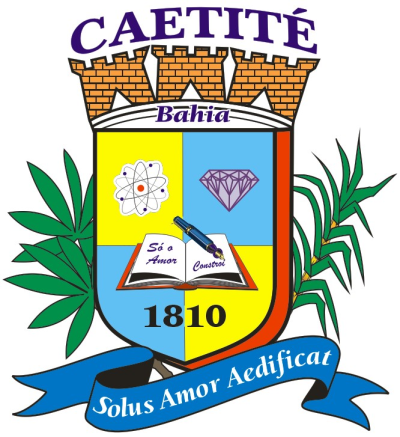
- Flag Coat of arms

- Location in Bahia
- Coordinates: 14°4′8.04″S 42°28′30″W
- Country: Brazil
- State: Bahia

Government
  - Mayor: Valtécio Aguiar (2021 – 2024)

Area
  - Total: 2,651.5 km^{2} (1,023.7 sq mi)

Population (2022)
  - Total: 52,012
  - Density: 19.616/km^{2} (50.805/sq mi)
- Time zone: UTC−3 (BRT)
- Postal code: 46400-xxx
- Area/distance code: (00)55

Caetité (Portuguese: [kaetʃiˈtɛ]) is a Brazilian municipality in the state of Bahia. It is located in the semi-arid sertão region in the interior of the state. It had an 52,012 inhabitants as of 2022. It covers 2,651.5 square kilometres (1,023.7 mi^{2}) and is 757 kilometres (470 mi) from the state capital, Salvador. Caetité borders on ten other municipalities, all within Bahia: Igaporã, Guanambi, Pindaí, Licínio de Almeida, Caculé, Ibiassucê, Lagoa Real, Livramento de Nossa Senhora, Paramirim, and Tanque Novo.

Its economy is primarily based on mining, notably of amethyst, uranium, iron and manganese. Caetité is the only producer of uranium in Latin America. It is an important cultural center of the state of Bahia, and has a historic center with numerous protected buildings. Caetité is the birthplace of educational and political figures such as Anísio Teixeira, Paulo Souto, Waldick Soriano, known as the "Brazilian Frank Sinatra". It is also home to the first normal school in the Bahian sertão. The school was founded by Anísio Teixeira during his tenure as General Director of Public Instruction of Bahia, and opened in 1926.

== Etymology ==
Caetité derives its name from the Tupi language, and means "big stone forest". It combines the words "ka'a", meaning forest, "itá", meaning stone, and "eté", meaning true. The name is a reference to the rock formation east of the city now known as Pedra Redonda.

== History ==
=== Early history ===
Archaeological sites in Caetité show continuous settlement in the area for more than 6,000 years. The earliest known inhabitant are the Jê people, who are closely related to the Tupinaé and Pataxós peoples. Some sources say that the Maracá (or Paiaiá) people occupied the region between the Serra do Sincorá and the Serra de Caetité at the end of the 16th century, and that Aracapá occupied the region between Minas do Rio de Contas and Caetité in the 17th century.

Caetité was a nucleus of Catholic proselytism of indigenous people in the 17th century. Cattle ranchers settled in the region at the same time due to the mild climate and water sources. After the establishment of permanent farms, the town served as one of the few resting stops for tropeiros, or cattle drovers, and miners travelling between Minas Gerais and the Chapada Diamantina.

=== 18th century ===
Several families settled in the region at the beginning of the 18th century. Minas do Rio de Contas was separated from Jacobina in 1724; it included lands that would belong to Caetité. The Carvalho family erected a church dedicated to Saint Anne in 1740, which soon generated a small settlement. It was elevated to the category of parish in 1754, under the name Santana do Caetité, and was a district of Minas do Rio de Contas. The population of Caetité petitioned the Portuguese Crown raise the parish to the category of village at the end of the 18th century. This was successful when Vila Nova do Príncipe and Santana were created on April 5, 1810.

=== 19th century ===
Johann Baptist von Spix and Carl Friedrich Philipp von Martius, a German biologists, visited Caetité in 1817 as part of an expedition of the interior of Brazil commissioned by Maximilian I Joseph, king of Bavaria. They wrote favorably about Caetité, noting that it was the most prosperous in the region, due to the cultivation of cotton. They also recorded the presence of a Latin royal school.

Major Silva Castro, a hero of the Independence of Bahia, was a resident of Caetité. His daughter, Pórcia, was kidnapped by Leolino Pinheiro de Azevedo. The episode inspired the novel Sinhazinha by the Afrânio Peixoto. Silva Castro was the grandfather of the poet Castro Alves.

The village participated indirectly in the struggles for the Independence of Bahia, which occurred as part of the larger independence movement of Brazil. The residents of Caetité supporting the Provisional Government installed in Cachoeira, a village in the Bahian Recôncavo outside the city of Salvador. Struggles against the Portuguese ended in the Bahian Recôncavo in 1823, and some fighting between Brazilians and Portuguese occurred in Caetité.

== Economy ==
Caetité, like much of the Brazilian semi-arid sertão, is noted for its livestock production. It additionally has low-level manufacturing of textiles and ceramics. Caetité also became a noted mining area beginning in the early 20th century, producing of amethyst, manganese, iron, and later uranium.

=== Uranium mining ===
Caetité is the only producer of uranium in Latin America. The Concentrate Unit Nuclear Company of Brazil (Portuguese: Unidade de Concentrado de Urânio, of (URA)) Fazenda Cachoeira mine is located 40 kilometres (25 mi) from the city center of Caetite. It operated from 2000 to 2014, and supplied fuel to Brazilian nuclear power plants, Angra 1, Angra 2 and, soon, Angra 3. There were five recorded accidents that contaminated the soil and water table of Caetite between 2000 and 2009. The municipalities also accused the company of high rates of cancer among the local population due to contact with radioactive material.

== Historic structures ==
Caetité is home to numerous colonial-period historic structures, many designated as Bahian state monuments. The Historic Center of Caetité was designated a state historic site by the National Institute of Historic and Artistic Heritage (IPHAN) in 2008.

Residences

- Birthplace of Cesar Zama
- House of Anísio Teixeira
- House at Praça Rodrigues Lima, no. 105
- House at Praça Rodrigues Lima, no. 178
- House at Praça Rodrigues Lima, no. 76

== Notable people ==
- Anísio Teixeira (1900-1971), pedagogue
- Haroldo Lima (1939-2021), politician
- Paulo Souto (1944), politician
- Rodrigues Lima (1845-1903), physician and politician
- Waldick Soriano (1933-2008), singer and songwriter

== Climate ==
Climate data for Caetité (1981–2010)
Month	Jan	Feb	Mar	Apr	May	Jun	Jul	Aug	Sep	Oct	Nov	Dec	Year
Mean daily maximum °C (°F)	28.2 (82.8)	29.2 (84.6)	28.1 (82.6)	27.6 (81.7)	26.9 (80.4)	25.2 (77.4)	25.1 (77.2)	26.3 (79.3)	28.3 (82.9)	29.4 (84.9)	28.4 (83.1)	27.9 (82.2)	27.6 (81.7)
Daily mean °C (°F)	22.9 (73.2)	23.5 (74.3)	22.9 (73.2)	22.5 (72.5)	21.5 (70.7)	19.9 (67.8)	19.6 (67.3)	20.4 (68.7)	22.3 (72.1)	23.5 (74.3)	23.1 (73.6)	22.9 (73.2)	22.1 (71.8)
Mean daily minimum °C (°F)	18.7 (65.7)	19.0 (66.2)	19.0 (66.2)	18.5 (65.3)	17.2 (63.0)	15.7 (60.3)	15.0 (59.0)	15.3 (59.5)	16.6 (61.9)	18.0 (64.4)	18.6 (65.5)	18.8 (65.8)	17.5 (63.5)
Average precipitation mm (inches)	98.4 (3.87)	69.0 (2.72)	120.7 (4.75)	45.8 (1.80)	12.5 (0.49)	10.1 (0.40)	10.4 (0.41)	4.9 (0.19)	17.6 (0.69)	61.9 (2.44)	153.6 (6.05)	164.6 (6.48)	769.5 (30.30)
Average precipitation days (≥ 1.0 mm)	7	6	9	5	3	3	3	2	2	4	10	11	65
Average relative humidity (%)	67.7	64.2	70.4	69.5	64.8	64.3	61.8	54.9	53.1	54.4	65.7	70.6	63.5
Mean monthly sunshine hours	230.3	220.0	207.5	206.0	219.8	214.8	233.3	260.7	251.9	239.2	187.5	188.1	2,659.1
Source: Instituto Nacional de Meteorologia
