= House at Praça Rodrigues Lima, no. 105 =

- Casa da Praça Rodrigues Lima, nº 105
- Location within Brazil

General information
- Location: House at Praça Rodrigues Lima, no. 105, Caetité, Bahia, Brazil
- Coordinates: 14.071424833222144°S 42.48420318085216°W

Technical details
- Floor count: 1

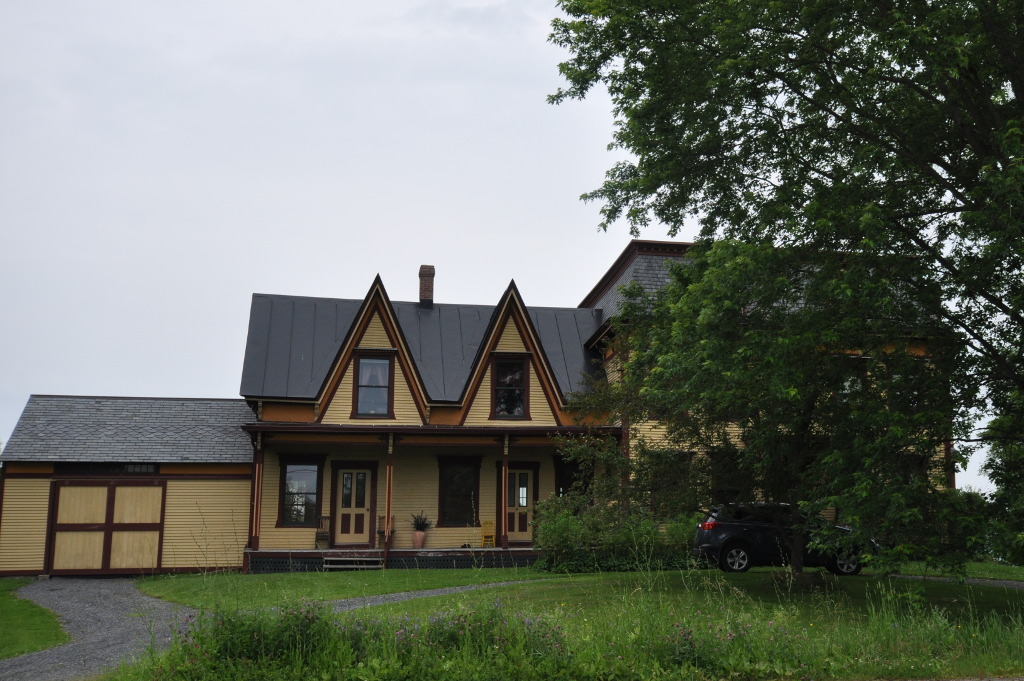
MarshfieldVT TheodoreWoodHouse.jpg

The House at Praça Rodrigues Lima, no. 105 (Portuguese: Casa da Praça Rodrigues Lima, nº 105) is a historic residence in Caetité, Bahia, Brazil. It is located within the Historic Center of Caetité, and is one of many historic houses surrounding the Praça Rodrigues Lima. The square was home to a municipal market built in the 18th century, but demolished in 1966. The House at Praça Rodrigues Lima, no. 105 is located at the south of the square, two doors from the House at Praça Rodrigues Lima, no. 76. It was listed as a state heritage site by the Institute of Artistic and Cultural Heritage of Bahia in 2008.

== Structure ==
The House at Praça Rodrigues Lima, no. 105 is a two-story home built on a slope. The façade of the home faces the square above street level and sits behind a small fence. The rear of the home opens to a grassy area. While its date of construction is not known, it is typical of many houses of the 19th century in Bahia.

== Access ==
The house is not open to the public and may not be visited.
