= Haroldo Lima =

Brazilian politician (1939–2021)

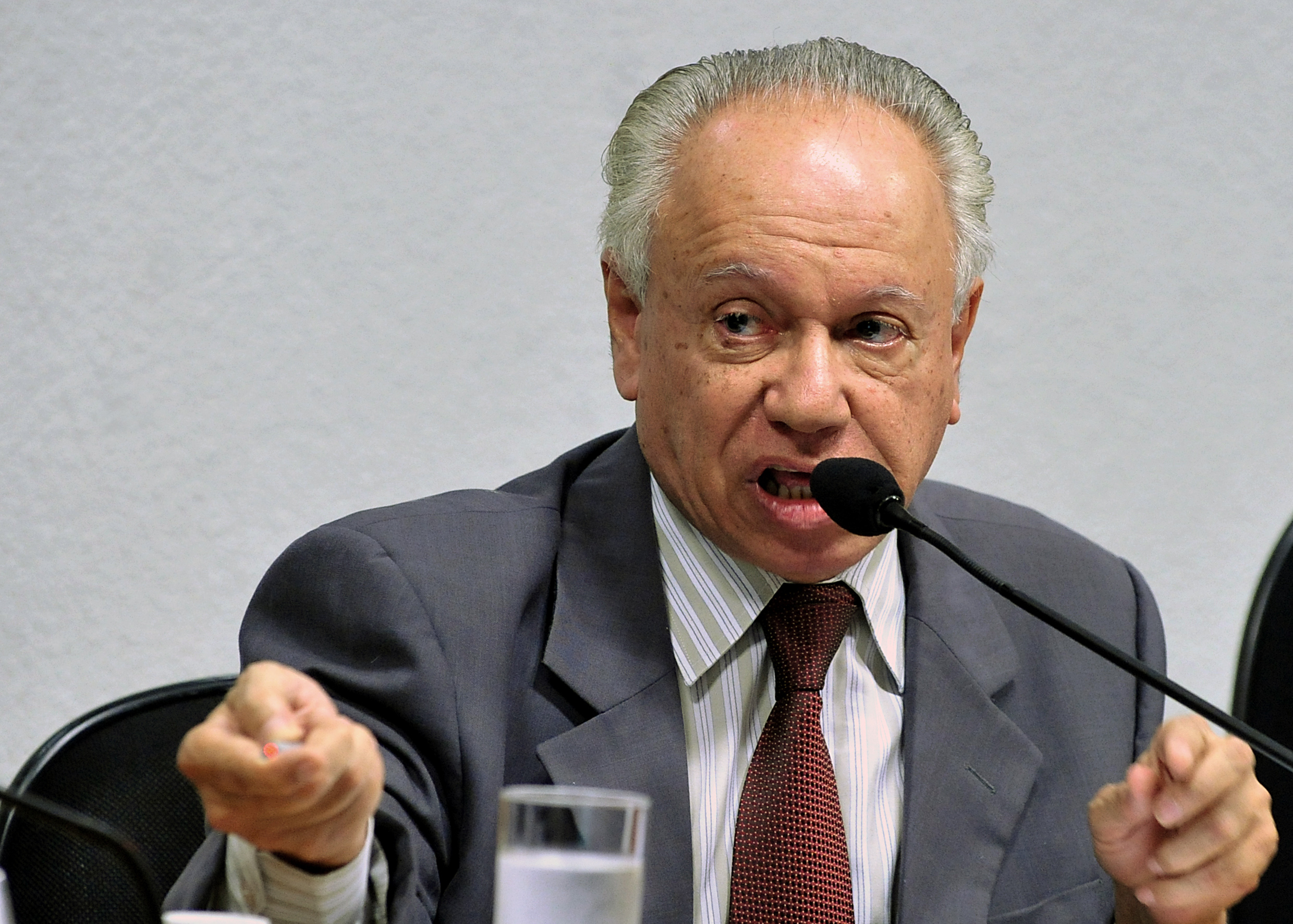
Lima

Haroldo Lima (15 January 1939 in Caetité – 24 March 2021 in Salvador, Bahia) was a Brazilian politician and anti-dictatorship activist.

== Biography ==
He served as a Deputy from 1983 to 2003 and as Director General of the National Agency of Petroleum, Natural Gas and Biofuels from 2005 to 2011.
