= Igaporã =

Municipality of Bahia, Brazil

- Municipality
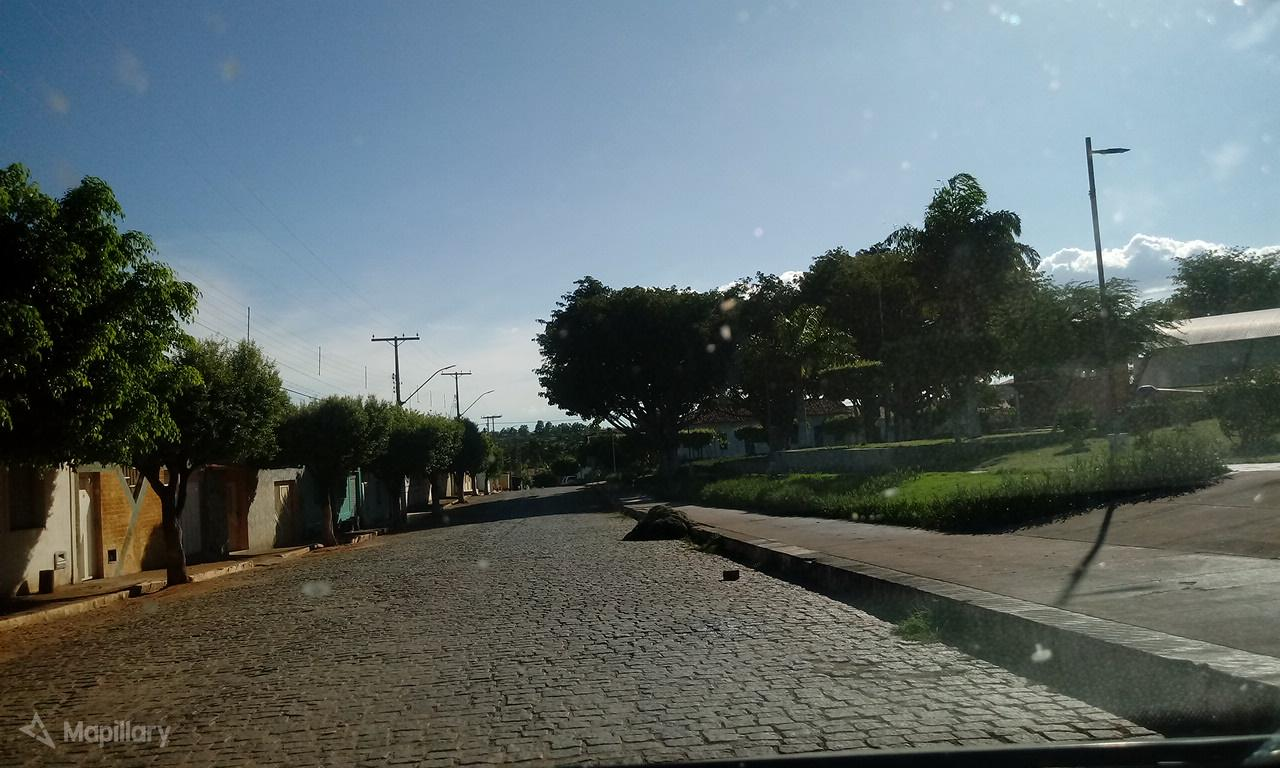
- Praça Bernardo de Brito, Igaporã

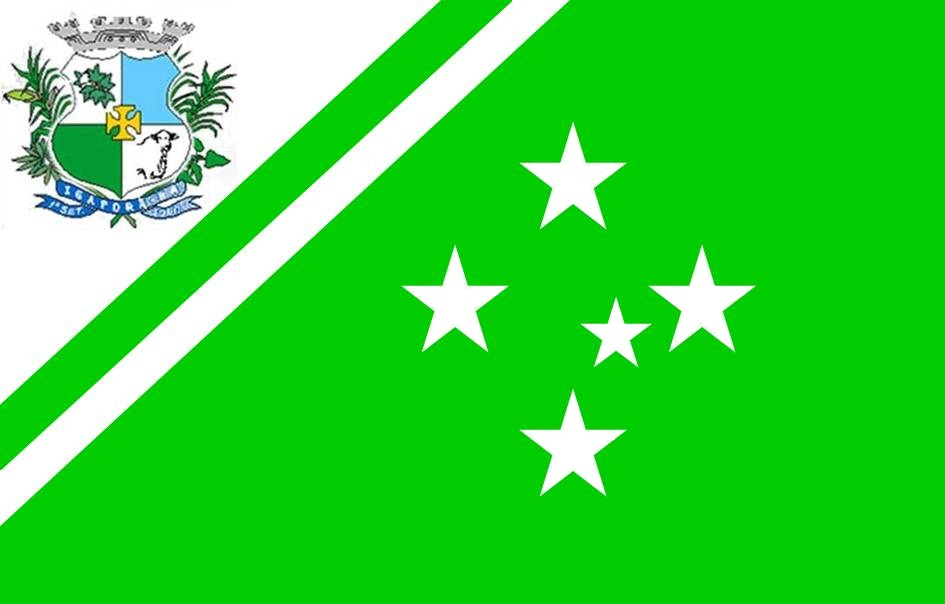
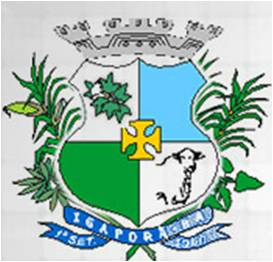
- Flag Coat of arms
- Interactive map of Igaporã
- Coordinates: 13°46′0″S 42°43′0″W
- Country: Brazil
- Region: Nordeste
- State: Bahia

Government
  - Mayor: Newton Francisco Neves Cotrim Neto (2021 – 2024)

Area
  - Total: 836.5 km^{2} (323.0 sq mi)

Population (2020)
  - Total: 15,650
- Time zone: UTC−3 (BRT)

Igaporã is a municipality in the state of Bahia in the North-East region of Brazil. It is located in the semi-arid sertão region in the interior of the state. It had an estimated 15,650 inhabitants as of 2020. It covers 836.586 square kilometres (323.008 mi^{2}) and is 682 kilometres (424 mi) from the state capital, Salvador. It is located in the southwest region of Bahia close to the Chapada Diamantina, a mountainous region of the state. Igaporã became an independent municipality by the State Law 556 of March, 25th 1953, and its territory was dismembered from the neighboring municipality of Caetité.

The Festa Junina de São Pedro, held annually from June 27 to 29, is the largest cultural event in Igaporã. The municipality also retains three traditional Catholic religious festivals related to Saint Sebastian, Mary, mother of Jesus, and Our Lady of Livramento.

== Etymology ==
Igaporã derives its name from the Tupi language and means "beautiful water".

== History ==
Bernardo de Brito, a Brazilian nobleman, came to present-day Igaporã in the 19th century. He settled in Pedra do Santo Antonio, and built a farmhouse. The settlement was elevated to village status in 1884 under the name Bonito, and was part of Caetité. It was elevated to district level on January 1, 1944 under the name of Igaporã. Igaporã was separated from Caetité in 1954, but the geographic division was declared unconstitutional in 1958, and Igaporã again became a district of Caetité. It was fully separated from Caetité on September 1, 1960, and the municipality dates it foundation to 1960. Igaporã became known for its "strong and fierce political disputes."

== See also ==
- List of municipalities in Bahia
