= Waldick Soriano =

Brazilian singer–songwriter

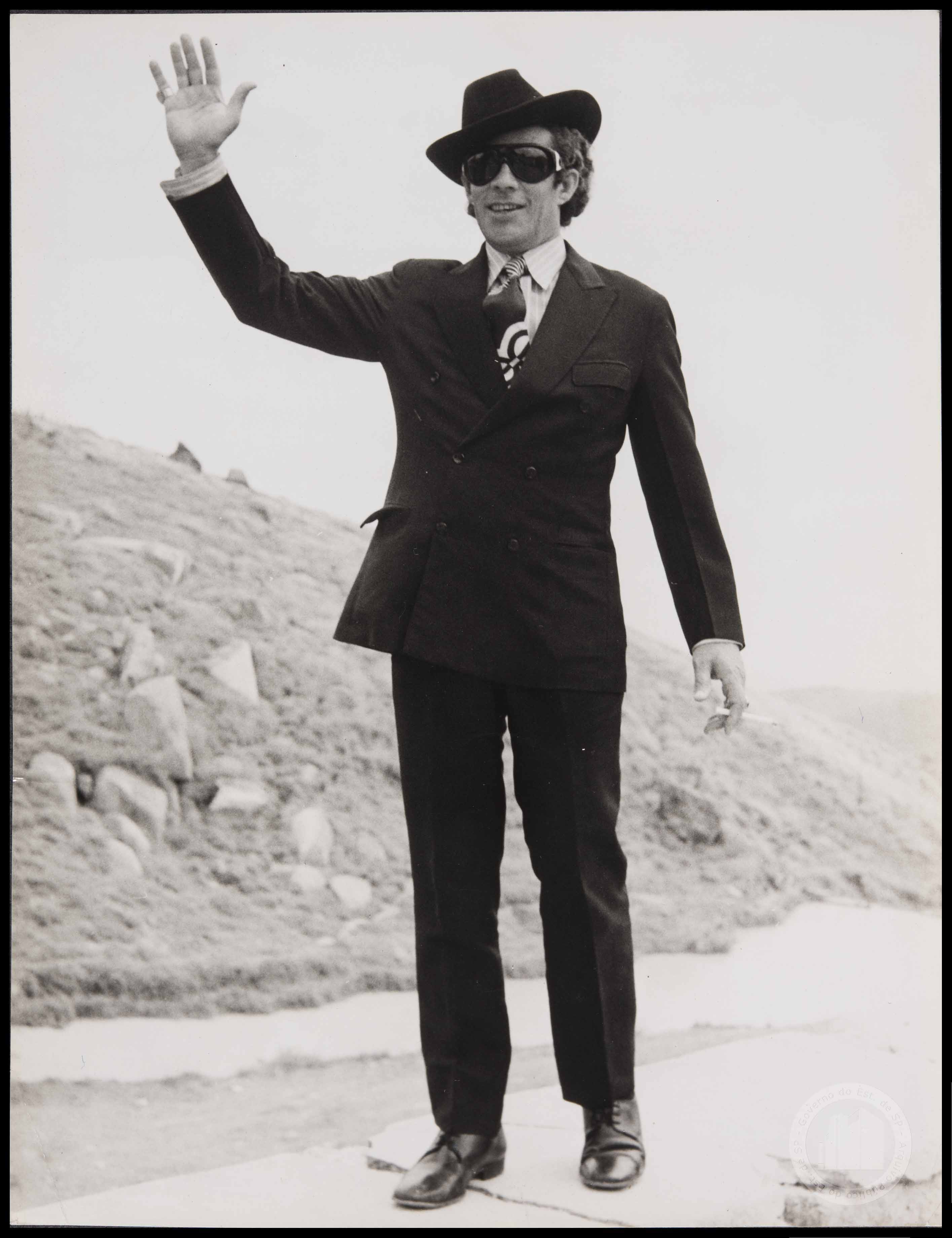

Background information
- Born: Eurípedes Waldick Soriano; May 13, 1933; Caetité, Bahia, Brazil
- Died: September 4, 2008 (aged 75) Rio de Janeiro, Rio de Janeiro, Brazil
- Genres: Brega
- Occupations: Singer, songwriter
- Instrument: Vocals
- Years active: 1959–2008
- Labels: Chantecler, Copacabana Discos, Continental Records, RCA Records, Som Livre

Eurípedes Waldick Soriano (May 13, 1933 in Caetité – September 4, 2008 in Rio de Janeiro) was a Brazilian singer–songwriter, best known as a composer and singer of songs in the brega style.

== Biography ==
Soriano was born in Bahia, where he lived and worked as a truck driver, prospector, and in manual labor until he was 25. He moved to São Paulo in 1959, where he began working at Rádio Nacional. His first album was issued in 1960, and his style of dramatic, sentimental songs became popular throughout Brazil. He went on to record dozens of albums and score many hits in his native country.

In 2005, Soriano was depicted in a documentary directed by Patrícia Pillar. It was titled Waldick - Sempre No Meu Coração (Waldick - Always In My Heart).

Soriano died of prostate cancer on September 4, 2008, at the age of 75.

== Discography ==
| Album | Label | Year |
|---|---|---|
| Quem és tu?/Só você | Chantecler | 1960 |
| Ninguém é de ninguém | Chantecler | 1960 |
| Dona do meu coração/Mais uma desventura | Chantecler | 1961 |
| Perdão pela minha dor/Amor de Vênus | Chantecler | 1961 |
| Sede de amor/Renúncia | Chantecler | 1961 |
| Waldick Soriano | Chantecler | 1961 |
| Fujo de ti/Tortura de amor | Chantecler | 1962 |
| Ciúmes/Desunião | Chantecler | 1962 |
| Homenagem a Recife/Amor numa serenata | Sertanejo | 1962 |
| Cantor apaixonado | Chantecler | 1962 |
| Quem é você?/Vestida de branco | Chantecler | 1963 |
| Foi Deus/Errei Senhor | Chantecler | 1963 |
| Pobre do pobre/Se eu morresse amanhã | Chantecler | 1963 |
| Motivos banais/É melhor eu ir embora | Chantecler | 1963 |
| A justiça de Deus/Tu és meu mundo | Chantecler | 1963 |
| Manaus, meu paraíso/Pisa no calo dele | Sertanejo | 1963 |
| Enfim você voltou/Pensei que estava sonhando | Chantecler | 1964 |
| Eu vou ao casamento dela/A maior injustiça do mundo | Chantecler | 1964 |
| O elegante Waldick Soriano | Chantecler | 1964 |
| Como você mudou pra mim | Chantecler | 1965 |
| Waldick sempre Waldick | Copacabana | 1967 |
| Boleros para ouvir, amar e sonhar | Copacabana | 1967 |
| Waldick | Continental | 1968 |
| No coração do povo | Continental | 1970 |
| Eu também sou gente | RCA | 1972 |
| Ele também precisa de carinho | RCA | 1972 |
| Segue o teu caminho | RCA | 1974 |
| Quero ser teu escravo | RCA | 1978 |
| Minha Ultima Noite | Gema | 2000 |
| Ao Vivo | Gema | 2001 |
| Ao Vivo - Só Sucesso | Gema | 2002 |
| Ao Vivo "Som Livre" | Som Livre | 2007 |
