= Rodrigues Lima =

First Elected Governor of Bahia

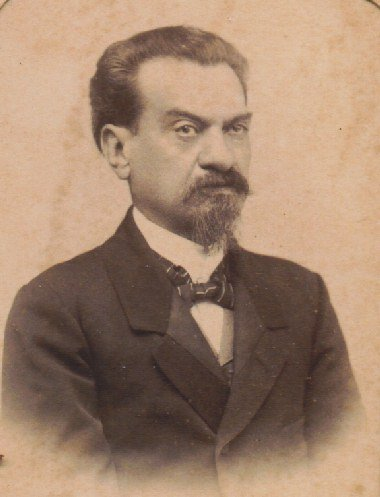
- Rodrigues Lima, c. 1900.

Governor of Bahia
- In office 1892–1896
- Preceded by: Leal Ferreira
- Succeeded by: Luís Viana

Personal details
- Born: May 4, 1845 Caetité
- Died: December 18, 1903 (aged 58) Caetité
- Education: Faculty of Medicine of Bahia
- Profession: Doctor

Military service
- Years of service: 1866–1869

Joaquim Manuel Rodrigues Lima (May 4, 1845 – December 18, 1903) was a Brazilian physician and politician who served in the Paraguayan War and was an attorney in the hometown and ruled the state of Bahia.

== Biography ==
He was the son of Captain Joaquim Manuel Rodrigues Lima and Rita Sofia Gomes de Lima (sister of the Baron of Caetité).

At the age of ten he went to study in Salvador and in 1862 he entered the Faculty of Medicine of Bahia, attending the 5th year, serves in the blood hospitals of the Paraguayan War, as a surgeon. He survived, with heroism, the sinking of the ship that was driving him to Uruguay. In 1868, after returning completes the medical course.

Returning to Caetité, he married the firstborn of the Baron of Caetité and his cousin, D. Maria Victoria Gomes de Albuquerque Lima. He practices the clinic, takes care of the farms and begins in politics, being elected three times to the Provincial Assembly. In 1876–77 he made extensive study trips throughout Europe.

At the time of the Proclamation of the Republic was the president of the City Council (the City Council, at the time). In 1891, when political parties are organized, he occupied the Municipal Intendency, being nominated for the State Constituent Assembly, where he proposed the change of the capital to Vitória da Conquista.

After the resignation of the intervenor José Gonçalves, had his name indicated to be the first elected president of the history of Bahia, in an election in which he obtains an overwhelming majority. After his rule, he returned to his homeland, where he still occupies the truth. He dies as one of the most progressive spirits in his city as one of the most progressive spirits in his city.

== Government of Bahia ==
His administration was marked by administrative restructuring, a total incentive to culture and education, marked mainly by probity (he wrote several times to his attorney in Caetité to send him money, because he did not think it was honest to avail himself of the public treasury to keep up). Several cultural institutions had their support to constitute themselves, among which the Geographic and Historical Institute of Bahia.

Rodrigues Lima also spread public works throughout the state, especially those to combat the effects of droughts (many of them existing to date), and by the internalization of quality education.

In Salvador he carries out several works, aiming to modernize and beautify the Capital: the most beautiful square in the city, Campo Grande, a tourist attraction that honors the heroes of Bahian Independence, is the work of his government.

== Tributes ==
Largo da Vitória, in Salvador, bears a bust in his honor. Pedro Celestino da Silva notes that this monument was initially erected in The Aclamation Square, and was later moved to the square. It also records that this was given as "a preito of longing and gratitude to the beneficent citizen who, by his civic and private virtues, left his name entirely linked to the history of Bahia, for his immaculate honor, for his greatness of mind and for his unfailing political loyalty". The monument was authorized by municipal resolution no. 144 of January 4, 1905, and inaugurated on May 13, 1911, by governor João Ferreira de Araújo Pinho and intendant (mayor) Antônio Carneiro da Rocha. The monument bears the following inscription: "Dr. in Medicine by the Faculty of Bahia; volunteer of the Paraguayan Health Corps;. provincial deputy; state senator; member of the Constituent; Intendant of the Municipality of Caetité, where he resided, and Governor of this State."

It is the name of several places in Bahia, especially in Lençóis and Caetité.

== Sources ==
- "Message and reports submitted to the Legislative General Assembly by Dr. Joaquim Manuel Rodrigues Lima, governor of the state, on April 7, 1893".
- "Message from the exmo. Dr. Governor of the State (Joaquim Manuel Rodrigues Lima), addressed to the General Assembly, at the 2nd session of the 2nd legislature, on April 7, 1894".
- "Message presented to the General Legislative Assembly by Dr. Joaquim Manuel Rodrigues Lima, governor of the state, on April 7, 1896".
