= Anísio Teixeira =

Brazilian educator (1900–1971)

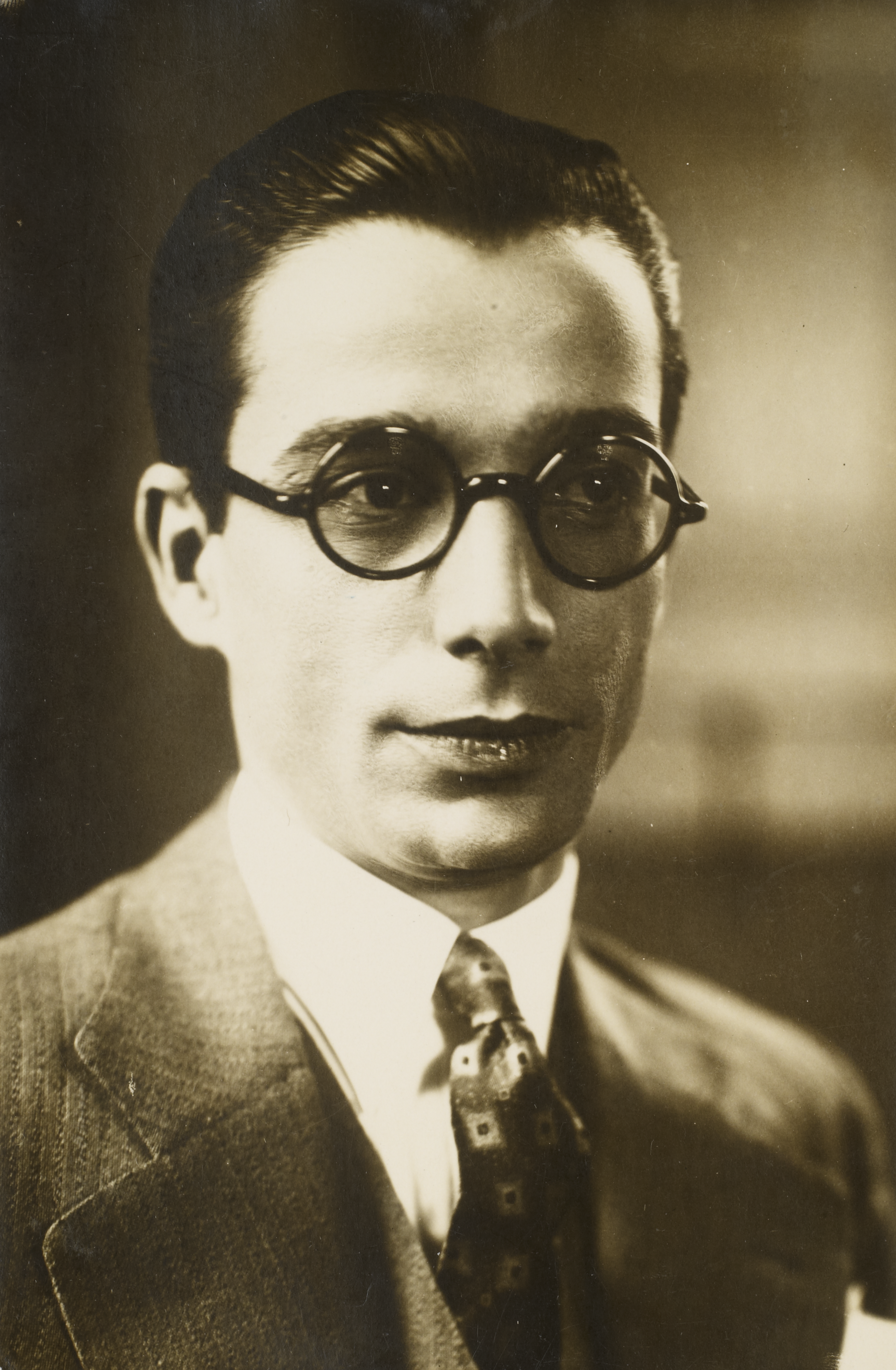
- Born: Anísio Spínola Teixeira; July 11, 1900; Caetité, Bahia, Brazil
- Died: March 11, 1971 (aged 71); Rio de Janeiro
- Occupations: Teacher, jurist, writer

Anísio Spínola Teixeira (July 12, 1900 – March 11, 1971) was a Brazilian educator, jurist, and writer. Teixeira was one of the reformers of Brazilian education of the early 20th century, being an advocate of progressive education in the country. He was one of the co-founders of the University of the Federal District, in 1935, and of the University of Brasília in 1960.

== Life and career ==
Teixeira was born in Caetité, in the state of Bahia, child of an influent landowner family. He studied at Jesuit schools in his hometown and in Salvador and graduated in law at the Federal University of Rio de Janeiro in 1922.

He started working as general-inspector of education of the state of Bahia in 1924, and visited Europe between 1925 and 1927, studying the educational system of several countries.

In 1927 Teixeira went to the United States, studying at the Teachers College, Columbia University, where he came in touch with John Dewey's pragmatism. Inspired by that philosophy, Teixeira came back to Brazil, where he went to be Rio de Janeiro (then Federal District) Director of Education.

He believed that education should be public, free, and laicist, attuned to a developing industrialized society, not focusing in memorization, but allowing the student's development. He was one of the signatories of the Manifesto dos Pioneiros da Educação Nova (Pioneers for a New Education Manifesto), advocating changes in Brazilian education.

Teixeira founded the Universidade do Distrito Federal in 1935, with basis on the New School tenets, which was met with a strong opposition of religious educators and sectors of the Getúlio Vargas government. Teixeira resigned of the Director of Education chair in 1939 and went back to Bahia, where he was invited by governor Octávio Mangabeira to work as State secretary of education. There he implemented the Escola Parque (park school) in the Salvador.

In 1951, Teixeira was appointed director of Instituto Nacional de Estudos e Pesquisas (INEP). After the Brazilian capital moving from Rio to Brasilia, Teixeira, together with Darcy Ribeiro and other people, planned a new university for the city. The University of Brasilia was founded in 1961, with Teixeira as its first rector.

After the 1964 Brazilian coup d'état, Teixeira left office and went to the United States, teaching at the Universities of Columbia and California. Back in Brazil in 1966, he became a consultant for the Getúlio Vargas Foundation.

== Death ==
Anísio Teixeira died in 1971, in circumstances considered obscure. His body was found in an elevator on Avenida Rui Barbosa, in Rio de Janeiro. Despite the accidental death report, there are suspicions that he was a victim of the repression forces of General Emílio Garrastazu Médici's government.

== Selected works ==
- Aspectos americanos de educação. Salvador. Tip. De São Francisco, 1928, 166 p.
- A educação e a crise brasileira. São Paulo: Cia. Editora Nacional, 1956, 355 p.
- Educação é um direito. 2ª ed. Rio de Janeiro: Editora UFRJ, 1996, 221 p.
- Educação e o mundo. 2ª ed. São Paulo: Cia. Editora Nacional, 1977, 245 p.
- Educação e universidade. Rio de Janeiro: Editora UFRJ, 1998, 187 p.
- Educação no Brasil. São Paulo: Cia. Editora Nacional 1969, 385 p.
- Educação não é privilégio. 5ª ed. Rio de Janeiro.- Editora UFRJ, 1994, 250 p.
- Educação para a democracia: introdução à administração educacional. 2ª ed. Rio de Janeiro: Editora UFRJ, 1997, 263 p.
- Educação progressiva: uma introdução à filosofia da educação. 2ª ed. São Paulo: Cia. Editora Nacional, 1934, 210 p.
- Em marcha para a democracia: à margem dos Estados Unidos. Rio de Janeiro: Editora Guanabara, s.d., 195 p.
- Ensino superior no Brasil: análise e interpretação de sua evolução até 1969. Rio de Janeiro: Editora da Fundação Getúlio Vargas, 1989, 186 p.
- Pequena introdução à filosofia da educação: an escola progressiva ou a transformação da escola. São Paulo: Cia. Editora Nacional, 1968, 150 p.
