= Birthplace of Cesar Zama =

- Casa natal de Cesar Zama
- Location within Brazil

General information
- Location: Praça da Catedral nº. 427, Caetité, Bahia, Brazil
- Coordinates: 12.604312°S 38.961501°W

Technical details
- Floor count: 3
- Floor area: 412 square metres (4,430 ft^{2})

The Birthplace of Cesar Zama (Portuguese: Casa natal de Cesar Zama) is a historic residence in Caetité, Bahia, Brazil. It was listed as a state heritage site by the Institute of Artistic and Cultural Heritage of Bahia in 2008. It is one of the contributing properties to the Historic Center of Caetité, and is noted as the birthplace of César Zama (1837-1906), a Brazilian physician and author. The house covers 412 square metres (4,430 ft^{2}) and has an upper and lower level with a small attic built on a slope, a model that resembles other houses in Bahia of the same period.

== Location ==
The Birthplace of Cesar Zama is located within the Historic Center of Caetité. It is one of many historic houses surrounding the Praça da Catedral, a broad public square opposite the Cathedral of Sant'Ana.

== History ==
The Birthplace of Cesar Zama initially belonged to the Fagundes Cotrin family. They subsequently sold it to Senhor Soriano, the husband of Rita de Souza Spínola. Spínola remarried in 1837, to Cesar Zama de Faenza, an Italian doctor. Aristides César Spínola Zama was born on November 19, 1837, in Caetité. Zama spent part of his childhood in the residence in Caetité, but moved to Salvador to study at Colégio Baiano of the Baron of Macaúbas. Zama later enrolled at the Faculty of Medicine of Bahia, the oldest in Brazil, and graduated in 1858 in medical and surgical sciences.

Zama enlisted as a voluntary physician in the Health Corps in 1865 after the beginning of the Paraguayan War. Beyond his work as a physician and politician, he authored three major works: Libelo republicano--comentários sobre a Campanha de Canudos, Os grandes oradores da Antiguidade, and Os grandes capitães da Antiguidade. Zama died in Salvador on October 20, 1906, at the age of 69. He was married to Hermínia Luísa Rocha Zama and had no children.

The house was renovated in 1929.

== Structure ==
The Birthplace of Cesar Zama is built on a slope with a ground floor with a veranda at the rear, a lower floor below, and a small attic. It covers 412 square metres (4,430 ft^{2}), and resembles other homes in Bahia built in the same period. The roughly square plan is arranged with the halls in front and a single corridor that leads from the entrance to the veranda. A kitchen is located on the lower floor farthest from the main house. The ground floor is additionally accessed by a small service door.

The façade is simple, with a portal and seven windows; two are to the left of the portal, and five to the right. Additionally, the upper and lower floors have numerous windows that open to the rear of the house. All the external and interior doors are framed in wood. The roof is covered in telha-vã, or hollow roof tile, and the laced fascia that spans the front of the house is an addition from the 1920s.

== Protected status ==
The Birthplace of Cesar Zama was listed as a state heritage site by the Institute of Artistic and Cultural Heritage of Bahia in 2008.

== Access ==
The house is not open to the public and may not be visited.
