= House at Praça Rodrigues Lima, no. 76 =

- Casa da Praça Rodrigues Lima, nº 76
- Location within Brazil

General information
- Location: House at Praça Rodrigues Lima, no. 76, Caetité, Bahia, Brazil
- Coordinates: 14.071424833222144°S 42.48420318085216°W

Technical details
- Floor count: 1

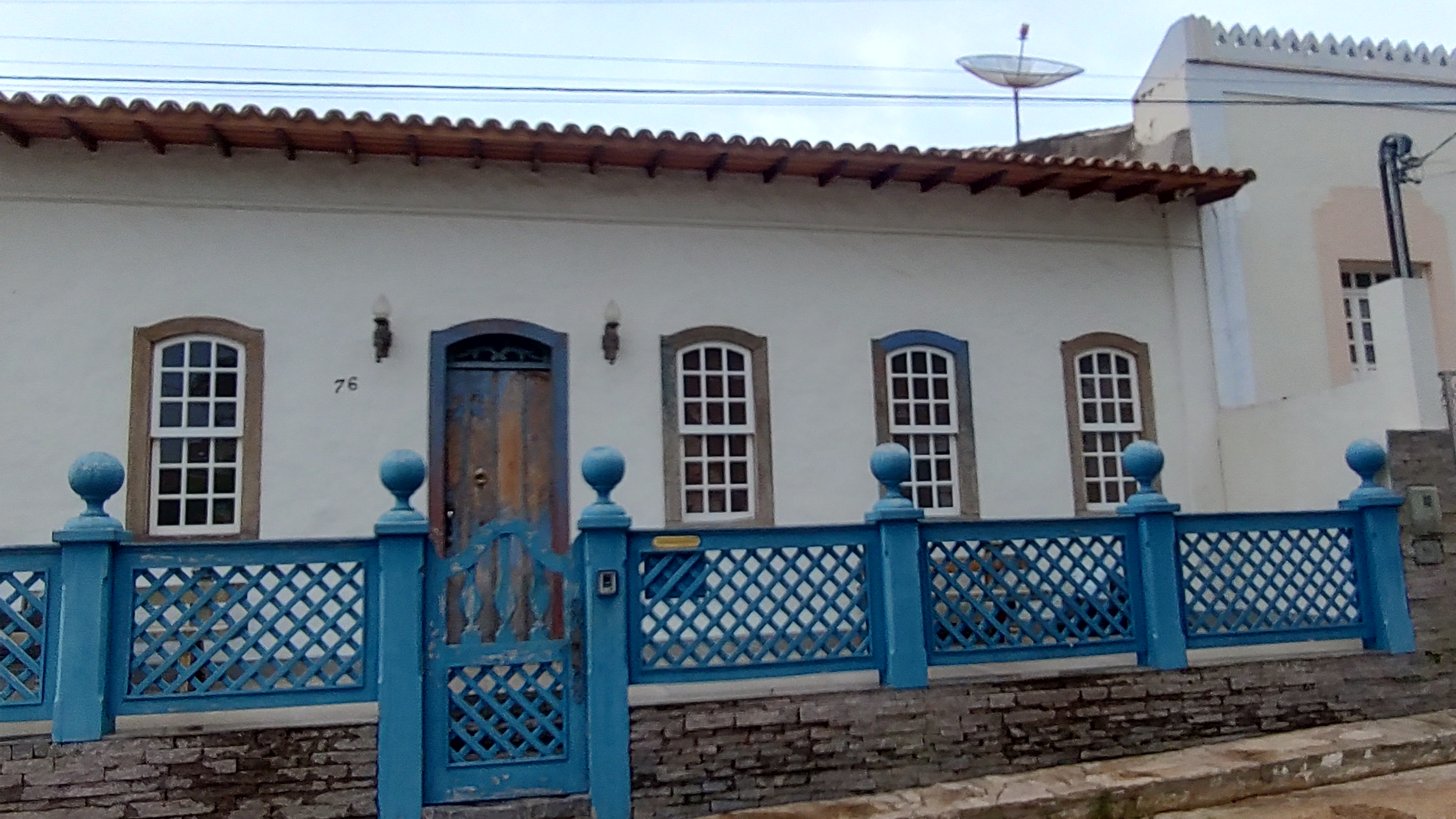
Casa Batista Neves Caetité 2022.jpg

The House at Praça Rodrigues Lima, no. 76 (Portuguese: Casa da Praça Rodrigues Lima, nº 76) is a historic residence in Caetité, Bahia, Brazil. Positioned within the Historic Center of Caetité, it is one of several historic houses surrounding the Praça Rodrigues Lima. The square was once home to an 18th-century municipal market, which has since been demolished. The house is located across the square from the House at Praça Rodrigues Lima, no. 178 and is among a row of houses that include the House at Praça Rodrigues Lima, no. 105. In 2008, it was listed as a state heritage site by the Institute of Artistic and Cultural Heritage of Bahia.

== Structure ==
The house has a single floor with a center portal, four windows on the left, and three on the right. It is aligned closely with the street on a modest slope and enclosed by a low fence.

== Access ==
The house is not open to the public and cannot be visited.
