= Tanque Novo =

Coordinates: 13°32′45″S 42°29′27″W

- Municipality
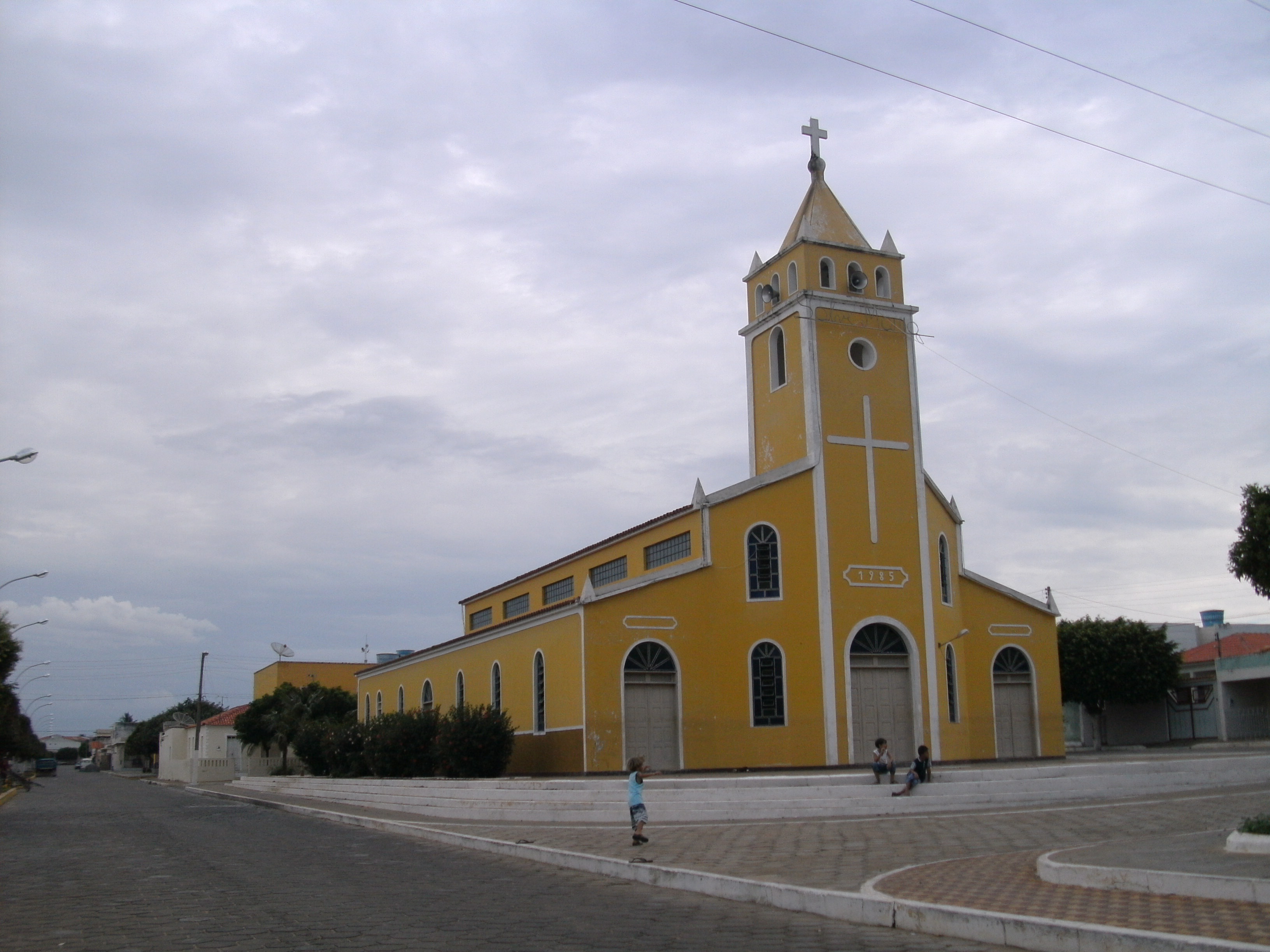

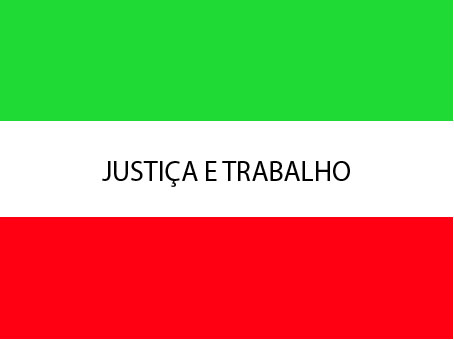
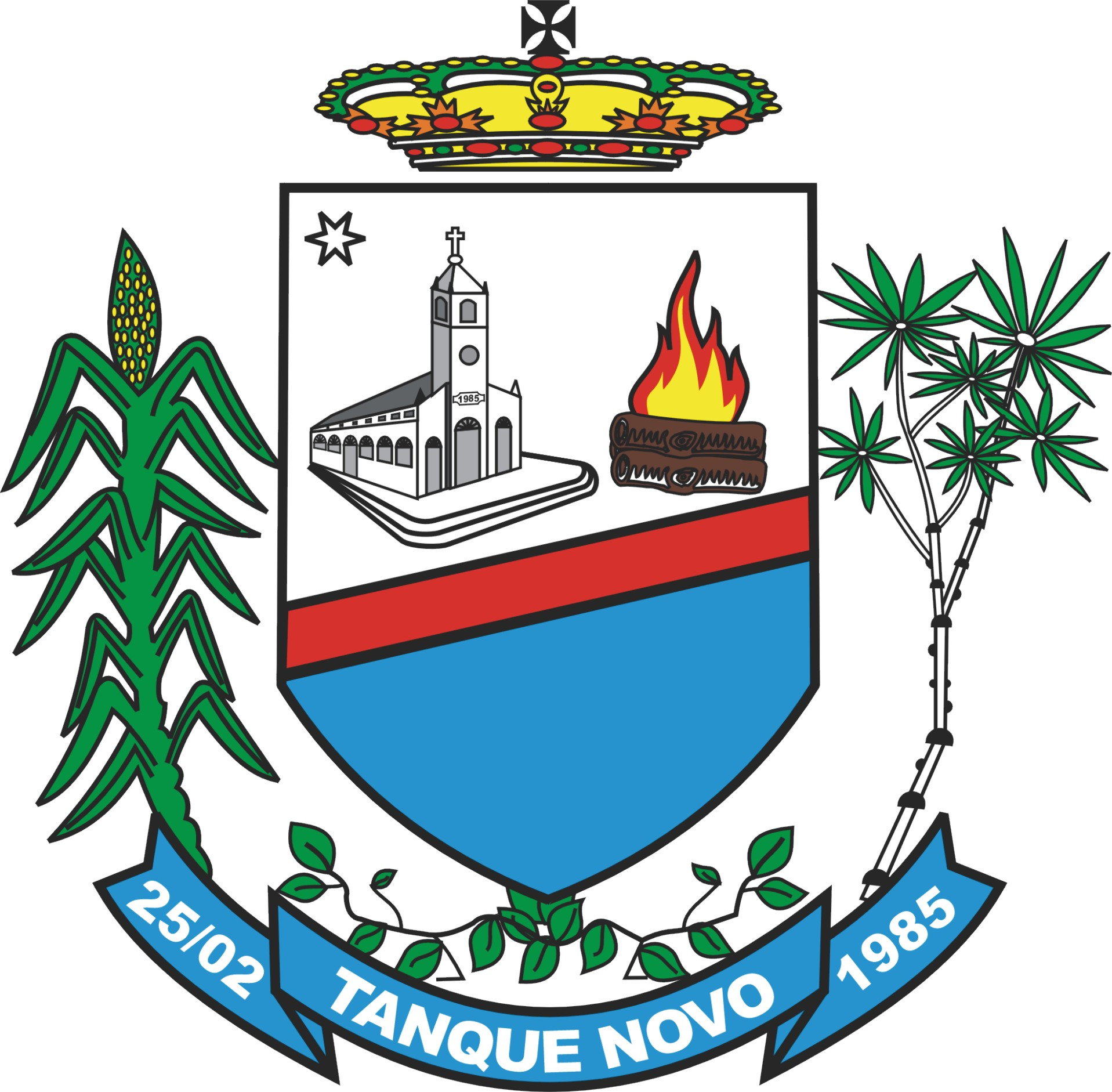
- Flag Coat of arms
- Interactive map of Tanque Novo
- Country: Brazil
- Region: Nordeste
- State: Bahia

Population (2020)
  - Total: 17,443
- Time zone: UTC−3 (BRT)

Tanque Novo is a municipality in Bahia, Northeast Region, Brazil.

== See also ==
- List of municipalities in Bahia
