= Paramirim =

Municipality of Bahia, Brazil

Coordinates: 13°26′34″S 42°14′20″W

- Municipality
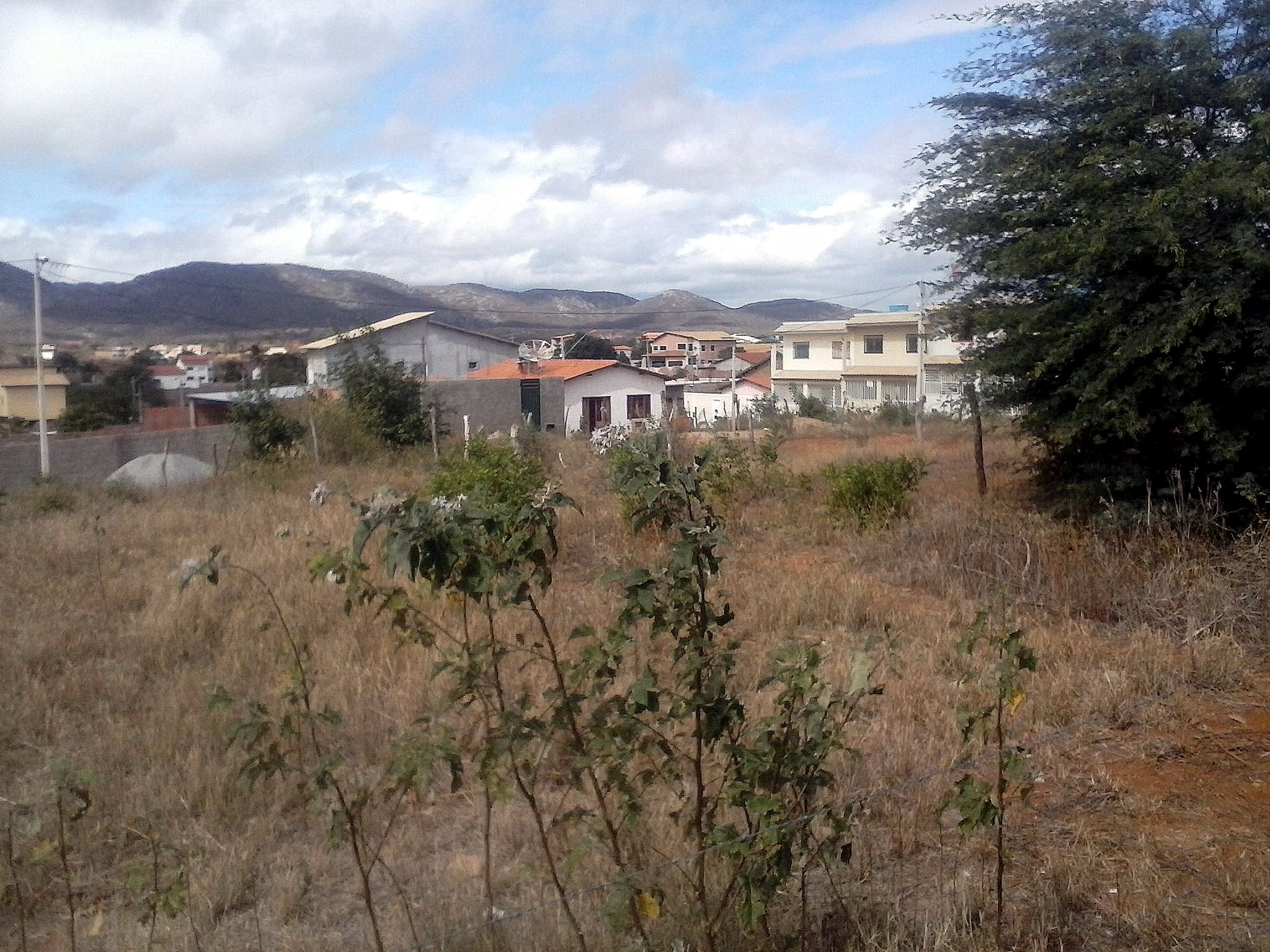

- Flag Coat of arms
- Interactive map of Paramirim
- Country: Brazil
- Region: Nordeste
- State: Bahia

Population (2020)
  - Total: 21,695
- Time zone: UTC−3 (BRT)

Paramirim (Brazilian Portuguese: [paɾamiˈɾĩ]) is a municipality in the state of Bahia in the North-East region of Brazil.

== See also ==
- List of municipalities in Bahia
