= Caculé =

Municipality of Bahia State, Brazil

- Municipality of Bahia, Brazil
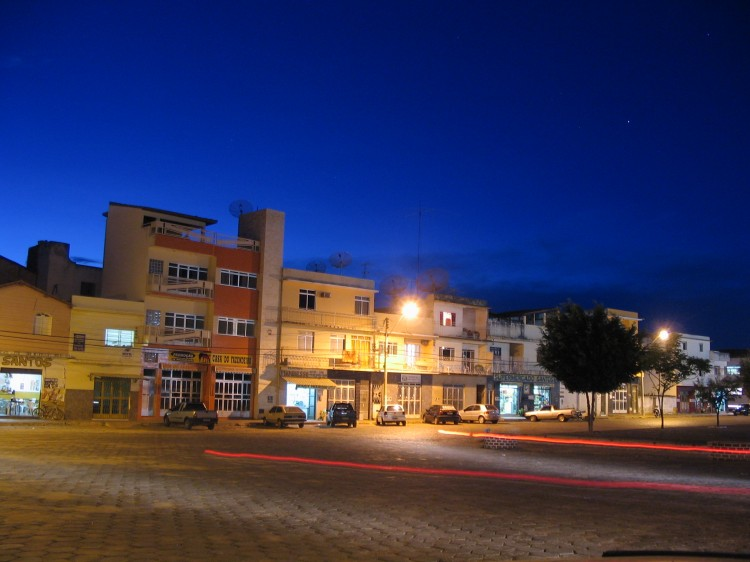
- Market square of Caculé

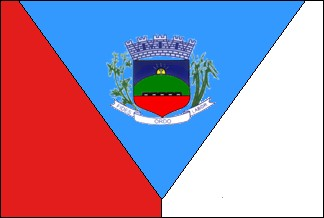
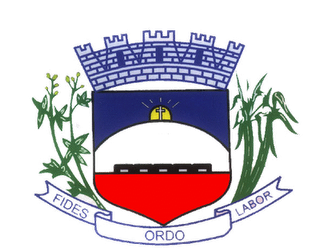
- Flag Coat of arms
- Etymology: Named after the farmer Manoel Caculé
- Motto: Latin: Fides, Ordo, Labor; English: Faith, Order, Work
- Location of Caculé in Bahia

- Location within Brazil Location within South America
- Coordinates: 14°30′10″S 42°13′19″W
- Country: Brazil
- Region: Northeast
- State: Bahia
- Founded: 14 August 1919

Government
  - Mayor: Pedro Dias da Silva (PSB) (2025-2028)
  - Vice Mayor: Willian Lima Gonçalves (PSB) (2025-2028)

Area
  - Total: 610.983 km^{2} (235.902 sq mi)
- Elevation: 587 m (1,926 ft)

Population (2022)
  - Total: 22,462
  - Density: 36.76/km^{2} (95.2/sq mi)
- Demonym: Caculense (Brazilian Portuguese)
- Time zone: UTC-03:00 (Brasília Time)
- Postal code: 46300-000
- HDI (2010): 0.637 – medium
- Website: governodecacule.ba.gov.br

Caculé is a Brazilian municipality located in the state of Bahia, which possesses 23,291 inhabitants as of 2020, according to IBGE. It is situated 750 kilometers southwest from Salvador. Its economy is based mostly on agriculture. The climate in Caculé is warm and dry during the day, being cooler at night, at about 15 °C. The "Rio Antônio" (river Antônio) crosses the city. Although it presently has no operational railroad station, Caculé is midpoint on the Ferrovia Centro Atlântica railroad route connecting Montes Claros to Salvador, Bahia.

== See also ==
- List of municipalities in Bahia
