= De Contas River =

River in Bahia, Brazil

Coordinates: 13.505521°S 41.900193°W

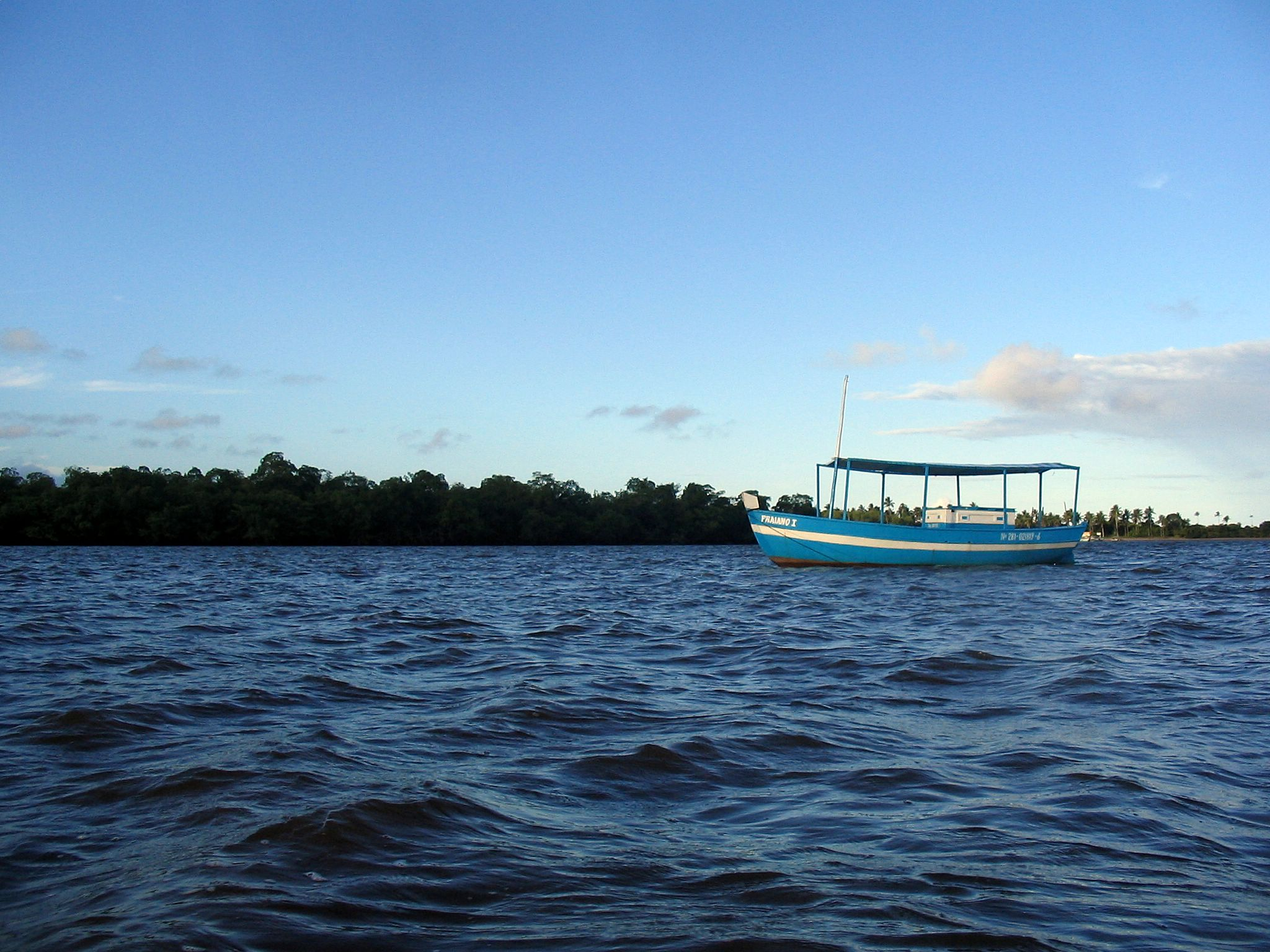

- Location within Brazil

Location
- Country: Brazil

Physical characteristics
- Source
  - location: Serra da Tomba, Bahia state
- Mouth
  - location: Atlantic Ocean
- Length: 620 kilometres (390 mi)

The De Contas River (Portuguese: Rio de Contas) is a river of Bahia state in eastern Brazil. In Portuguese, it is sometimes erroneously called "Rio das Contas". It is the main river of the hydrographic basin named after him.

Its source is in Tromba Mountain, between the municipalities of Piatã and Rio de Contas,( 13°16'48 S - 41°47'02 O ) passing through the cities of Abíra, Jussiape, Dom Basílio, Tanhaçu, Jequié (where the Pedras Dam was erected), Jitaúna, Ipiaú, Itagibá, Barra do Rocha, Ubatã, Ubaitaba and Aurelino Leal, to finally to its mouth in the Atlantic Ocean in Itacaré.

== Hydrographic basin ==
It is one of the sixteen hydrographic basins of the Brazilian state of Bahia, and is subordinate administratively to the National Department of Works to Combat Drought (DNOCS). The basin comprises its main effluents, which are: Brumado River, António River, Gongogi River, Jequiezinho River, Gavião River, Sincorá River and Jacaré River.

It encompasses a territory of 55,334 square kilometres (21,365 mi^{2}), with a population of 1,423,153 inhabitants (in 1991). Its economic uses are varied: irrigation, energy production, mining, and supplying the cities in its perimeter.

It is the largest basin that is entirely located in the Brazilian state of Bahia, in which are located 86 municipalities, a territory equivalent to 10.2 percent of the state territory.

Its limits: in west by the São Francisco Basin; in east by the Atlantic Ocean; in South by do Rio Pardo and Rio Colônia basins and the Brazilian state of Minas Gerais; and in North by the basins of the Paraguaçu River and Jequiriçá River.

== See also ==
- List of rivers of Bahia
- Rio de Contas - Bahia city, by the banks of Brumado River, former De Contas Pequeno River
