= Gongogi River =

Coordinates: 14°17′36″S 39°25′43″W

- Location within Brazil

Location
- Country: Brazil

Physical characteristics
- Source
  - location: Bahia state
- Mouth
  - location: De Contas River

The Gongogi River (Portuguese: Rio Gongoji) is a river of Bahia state in eastern Brazil. It flows through the municipalities of Gongogi, Nova Canaã, Iguaí, and Itagibá. It empties into the De Contas River

== See also ==
- List of rivers of Bahia
