= Adilson (footballer, born February 1987) =

Brazilian footballer

Personal information
- Full name: Adilson dos Santos Souza
- Date of birth: 18 February 1987 (age 39)
- Place of birth: Barra do Rocha, Brazil
- Height: 1.77 m (5 ft 10 in)
- Position: Forward

Youth career
- 2000–2002: Rio Branco-PR
- 2002–2004: Cruzeiro
- 2004–2005: Corinthians

Senior career*
Years	Team	Apps	(Gls)
2006–2007	Sport Recife	1	(0)
2007	→ Grêmio Barueri (loan)	0	(0)
2007	→ Ipatinga (loan)	0	(0)
2008–2009	XV de Piracicaba	0	(0)
2008	→ SEV Hortolândia (loan)	0	(0)
2009	Mogi Mirim	0	(0)
2010	Noroeste	0	(0)
2010–2012	XV de Piracicaba	40	(17)
2012	→ Corinthians (loan)	11	(0)
2013–2014	XV de Piracicaba	17	(1)
2014	→ Santa Cruz (loan)	2	(0)
2015–2016	Yangon United	10	(5)
2017	Portuguesa	2	(0)
2018	Marília	0	(0)
2019	CA Juventus	0	(0)
2019	Ituano	4	(0)
2019	Atibaia		
2020	Rio Claro	0	(0)
- * Club domestic league appearances and goals as of 22:29, 4 February 2020 (UTC)

Adilson dos Santos Souza (born 18 February 1987 in Barra do Rocha), simply known as Adilson, is a Brazilian footballer who plays as a forward.

== Statistics ==
Club performance
Club	Season	Brasileirão Série A		Brasileirão Série B		Copa do Brasil		Libertadores		Campeonato Paulista		Friendly		Total
Club	Season	App	Goals	App	Goals	App	Goals	App	Goals	App	Goals	App	Goals	App	Goals
Sport	2007	1	0	0	0	0	0	0	0	0	0	0	0	1	0
XV de Piracicaba	2012	0	0	0	0	0	0	0	0	18	5	0	0	18	5
Corinthians	2012	11	0	0	0	0	0	0	0	0	0	0	0	11	0
Total		12	0	0	0	0	0	0	0	18	5	0	0	30	5
