= Gongogi =

Municipality of Bahia, Brazil

Gongogi Município de Gongogi
- Municipality
- Location of Gongogi in Bahia

- Location of Gongogi in Brazil
- Coordinates: 14°19′19″S 39°27′54″W
- Country: Brazil
- Region: Northeast
- State: Bahia
- Founded: April 12, 1962

Government
  - Mayor: Altamirando de Jesus Santos (PDT, 2013–2016)

Area
  - Total: 195.39 km^{2} (75.44 sq mi)
- Elevation: 115 m (377 ft)

Population (2020)
  - Total: 6,985
  - Density: 35.75/km^{2} (92.59/sq mi)
- Demonym: Gongojiense
- Time zone: UTC−3 (BRT)

Gongogi is a municipality in the state of Bahia in the North-East region of Brazil. It covers 195.39 km^{2} (75.44 mi^{2}), and has a population of 6,985 with a population density of 41 inhabitants per square kilometer. It was named after the Gongogi River which forms the southern border of the municipality.
