= Brumado River =

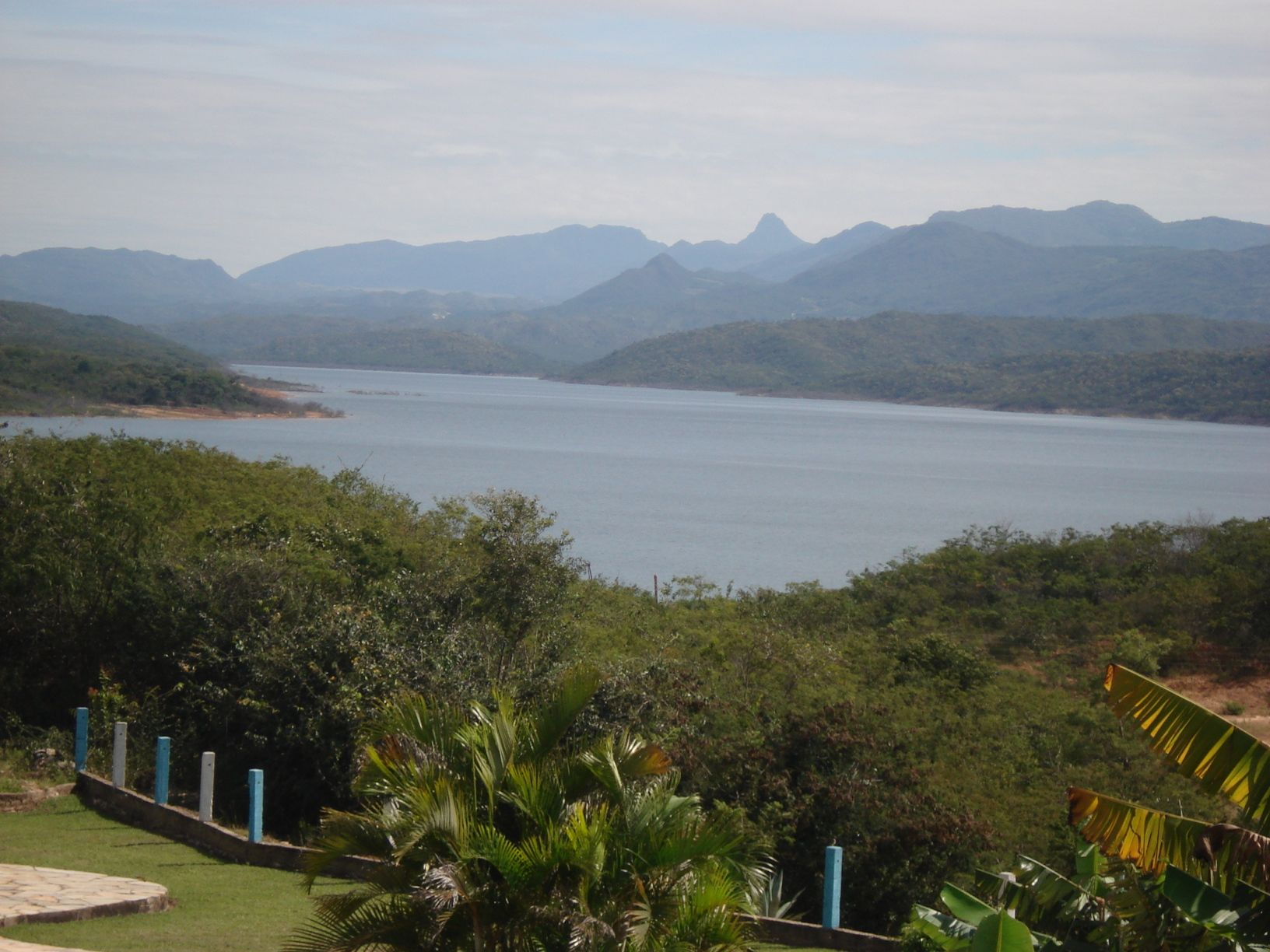

Location
- Country: Brazil

Physical characteristics
- Source
  - location: Bahia state
- Mouth: De Contas River
  - coordinates: 14°5′S 41°19′W

The Brumado River is a river of Bahia state in eastern Brazil.

== See also ==
- List of rivers of Bahia
