= Jacaré River (Bahia, Das Contas River tributary) =

Location
- Country: Brazil

Physical characteristics
- Source
  - location: Bahia state
- Mouth: De Contas River
  - coordinates: 13°50′S 40°40′W

The Jacaré River is a river of Bahia state in eastern Brazil. It is a tributary of the De Contas River.

== See also ==
- List of rivers of Bahia
