= Jitaúna =

Municipality of Bahia, Brazil

Coordinates: 14°01′S 39°57′W

- Municipality
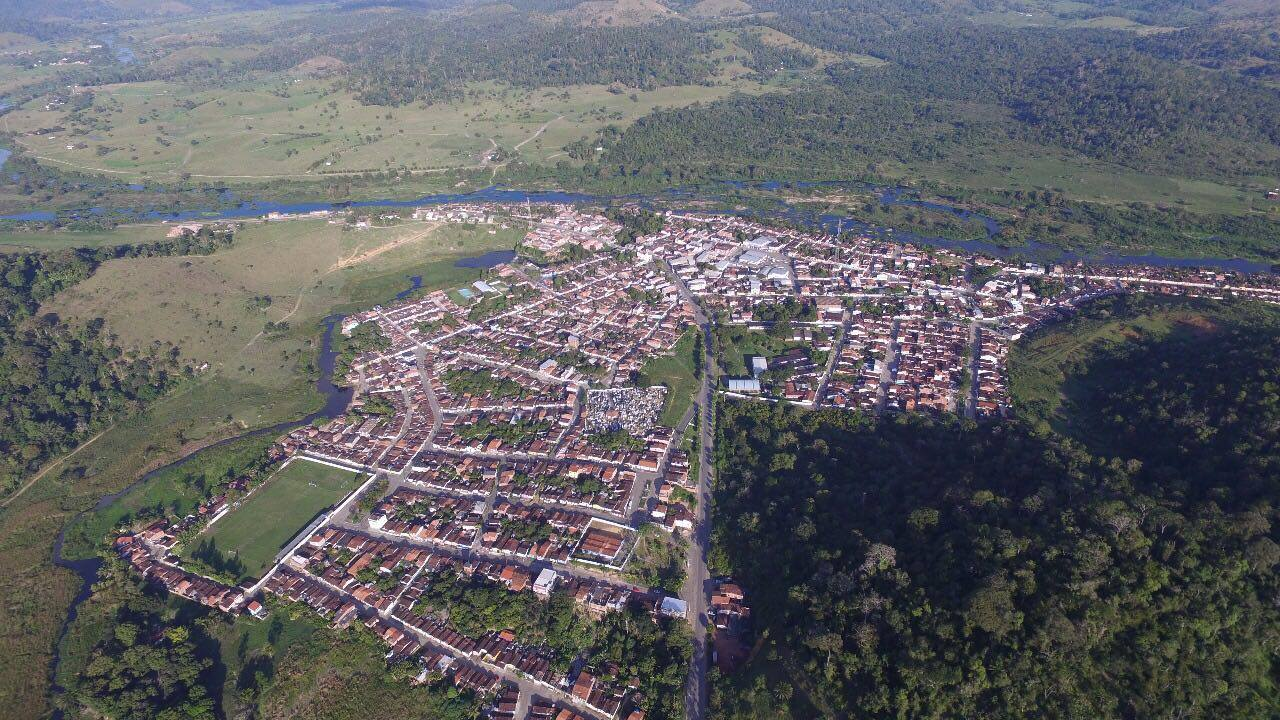
- View of Jitaúna

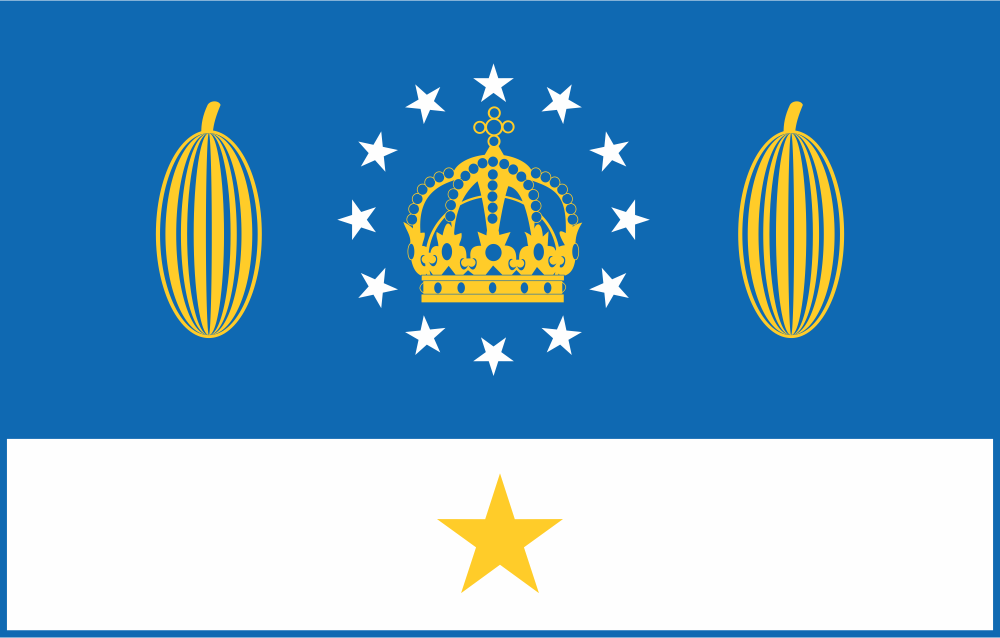
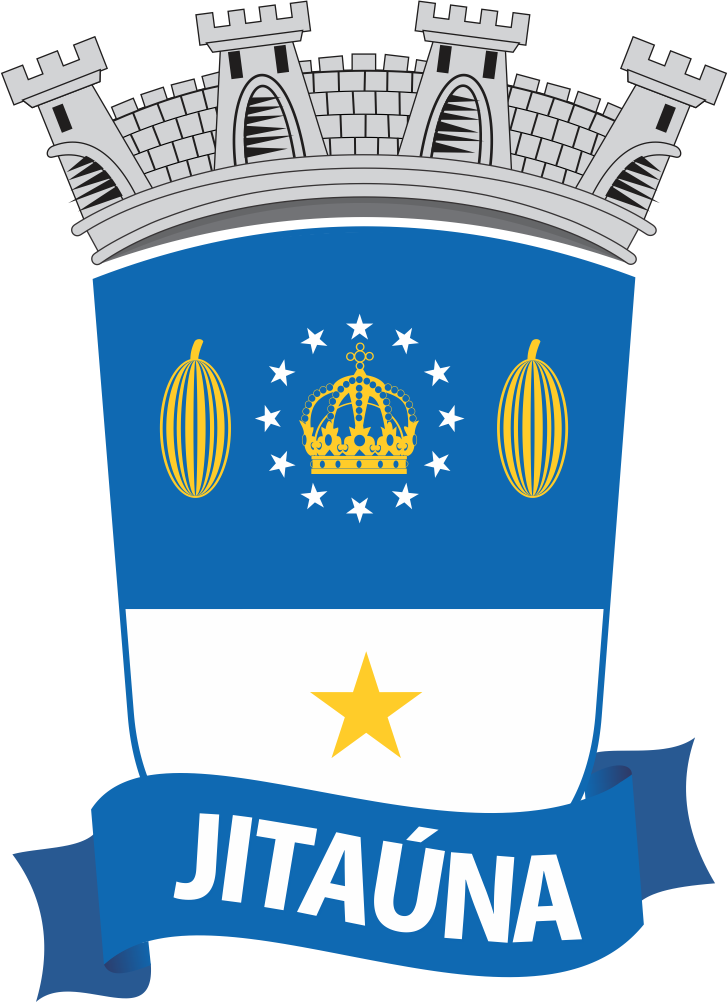
- Flag Coat of arms
- Interactive map of Jitaúna
- Country: Brazil
- Region: Nordeste
- State: Bahia

Population (2020)
  - Total: 10,808
- Time zone: UTC−3 (BRT)

Jitaúna is a municipality in the state of Bahia in the North-East region of Brazil.

== See also ==
- List of municipalities in Bahia
