= Nova Canaã, Bahia =

Municipality of Bahia, Brazil

Nova Canaã
- Municipality
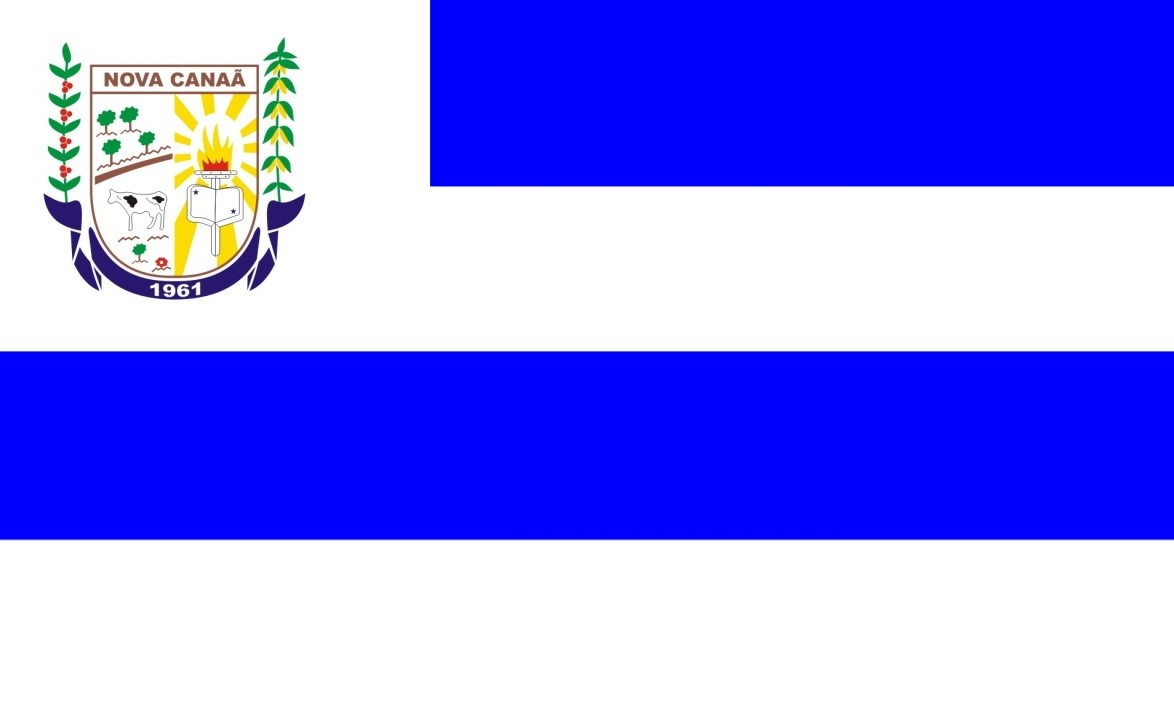
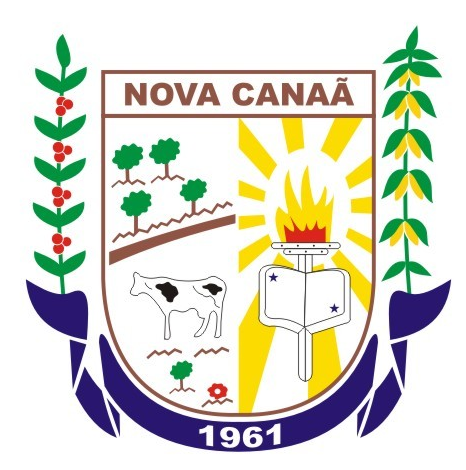
- Flag Coat of arms

- Location in Bahia state

- Location in Brazil
- Coordinates: 14°47′38″S 40°8′31″W
- Country: Brazil
- Region: Northeast
- State: Bahia

Area
  - Total: 805 km^{2} (311 sq mi)

Population (2020)
  - Total: 16,472
  - Density: 20.5/km^{2} (53.0/sq mi)
- Time zone: UTC−3 (BRT)

Nova Canaã is a municipality in the state of Bahia in the North-East region of Brazil. The population is 16,472 (2020 est.) in an area of 805 km^{2} (311 sq mi).

== See also ==
- List of municipalities in Bahia
