= Jequiriçá River =

River in Bahia, Brazil

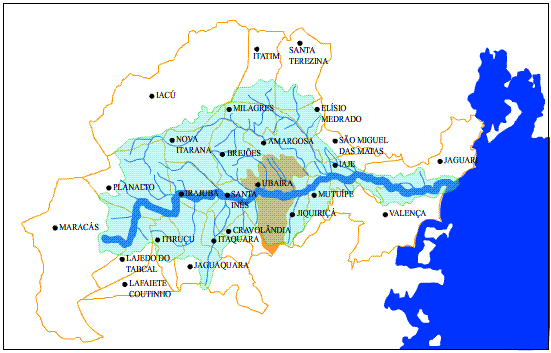

Location
- Country: Brazil

Physical characteristics
- Source
  - location: Bahia state
- Mouth: Atlantic Ocean
  - coordinates: 13°13′S 38°56′W

The Jequiriçá River is a river of Bahia state in eastern Brazil.

== See also ==
- List of rivers of Bahia
