= Aurelino Leal =

Municipality of Bahia, Brazil

- Municipality
- Location in Brazil
- Coordinates: 14°19′01″S 39°19′37″W
- Country: Brazil
- Region: Nordeste
- State: Bahia

Population (2020)
  - Total: 11,299
- Time zone: UTC−3 (BRT)

Aurelino Leal is a municipality in the state of Bahia in the North-East region of Brazil.

== See also ==
- List of municipalities in Bahia
