= Pau de Colher =

Village in Bahia, Brazil

- Village
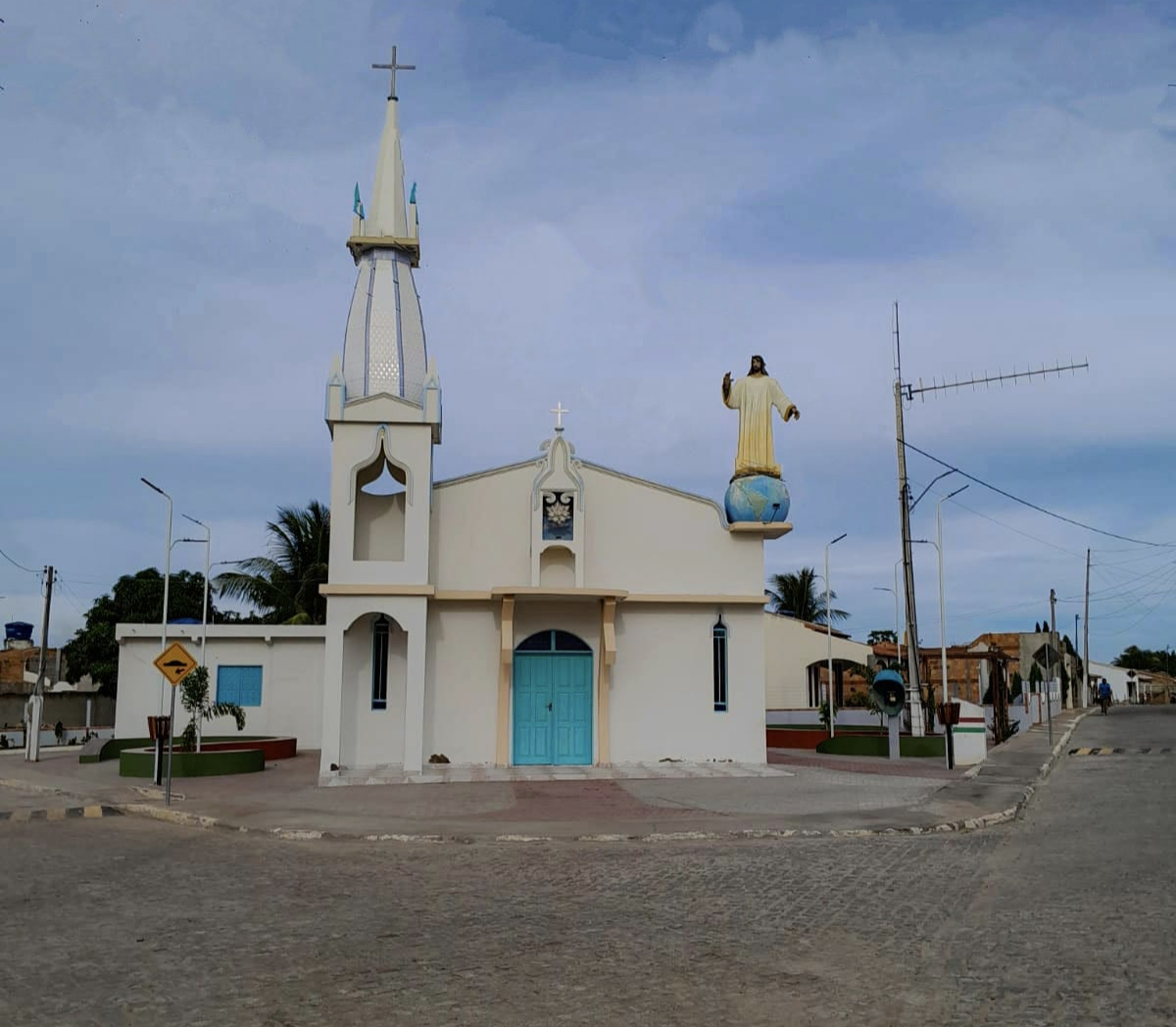
- Church of Nossa Senhora da Piedade, Pau de Colher

- Location of Fátima in Bahia

- Location within Brazil
- Coordinates: 10°37′44″S 38°10′27″W
- Country: Brazil
- State: Bahia
- Municipality: Fátima
- Elevation: 292 m (958 ft)
- Population (2022): 150

Pau de Colher is a village in the municipality of Fátima, state of Bahia, in northeastern Brazil. As of 2022, it had a population of 150. Pau de Colher received its name from the Portuguese word for the plant Maytenus rigida.
