= Fátima, Bahia =

Municipality of Bahia, Brazil

Coordinates: 10°36′00″S 38°13′01″W

Fátima
- Municipality
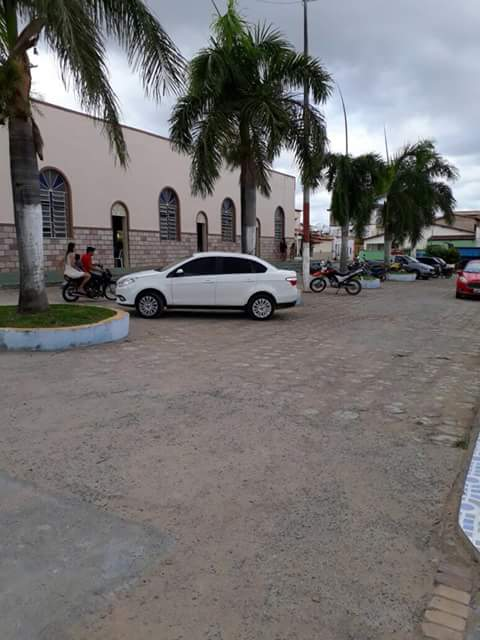

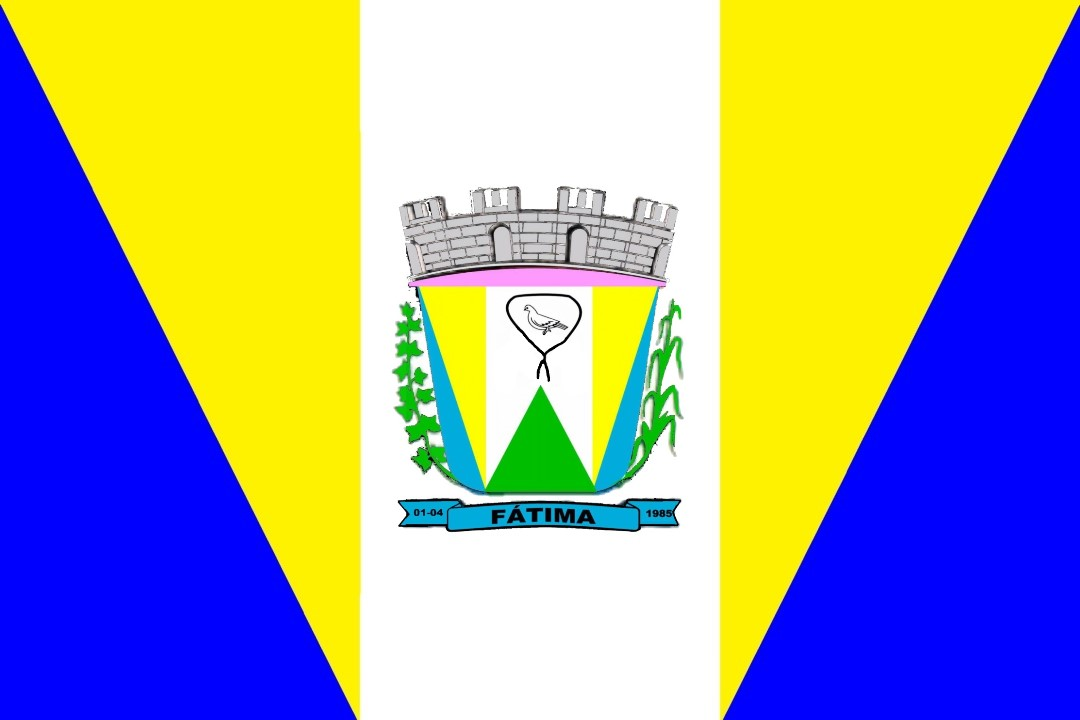
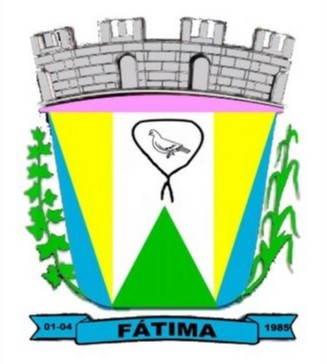
- Flag Coat of arms
- Interactive map of Fátima
- Country: Brazil
- Region: Nordeste
- State: Bahia

Population (2020)
  - Total: 17,845
- Time zone: UTC−3 (BRT)

Fátima is a municipality in the state of Bahia in the North-East region of Brazil.

== See also ==
- List of municipalities in Bahia
