= Advaldo =

Brazilian footballer (born 1986)

Personal information
- Full name: Advaldo de Oliveira Silva
- Date of birth: June 15, 1986 (age 40)
- Place of birth: Mascote-BA, Brazil
- Height: 1.69 m (5 ft 7 in)
- Position: Midfielder

Youth career
- 2004: Vitória

Senior career*
| Years | Team | Apps | (Gls) |
| 2005–2006 | Vitória | | |
| 2007 | Flamengo | | |
| 2007 | Avaí | | |
| 2008 | Sport Recife | | |
| 2008 | Ipatinga | | |
| 2009 | São Caetano | | |
| 2010 | Fluminense de Feira | | |
| 2011 | Campinense | | |
| 2012 | Juazeiro | 7 | (0) |
| 2014 | São José | | |
- * Club domestic league appearances and goals

Advaldo de Oliveira Silva (born June 15, 1986), or simply Advaldo, is a Brazilian former professional footballer who played as a midfielder.
