= Salvador, Bahia =

Capital city of Bahia, Brazil

Salvador
- Municipality
- Municipality of Salvador; Município de Salvador
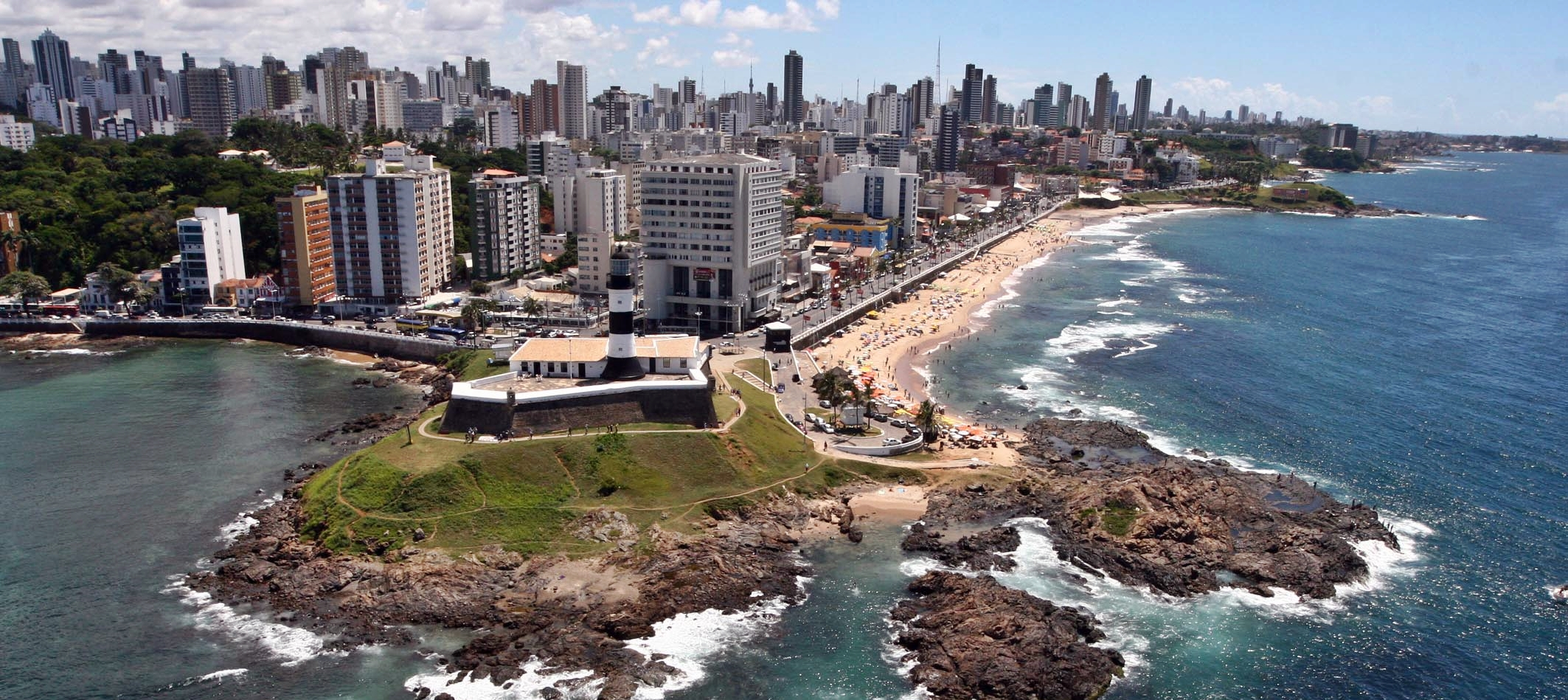
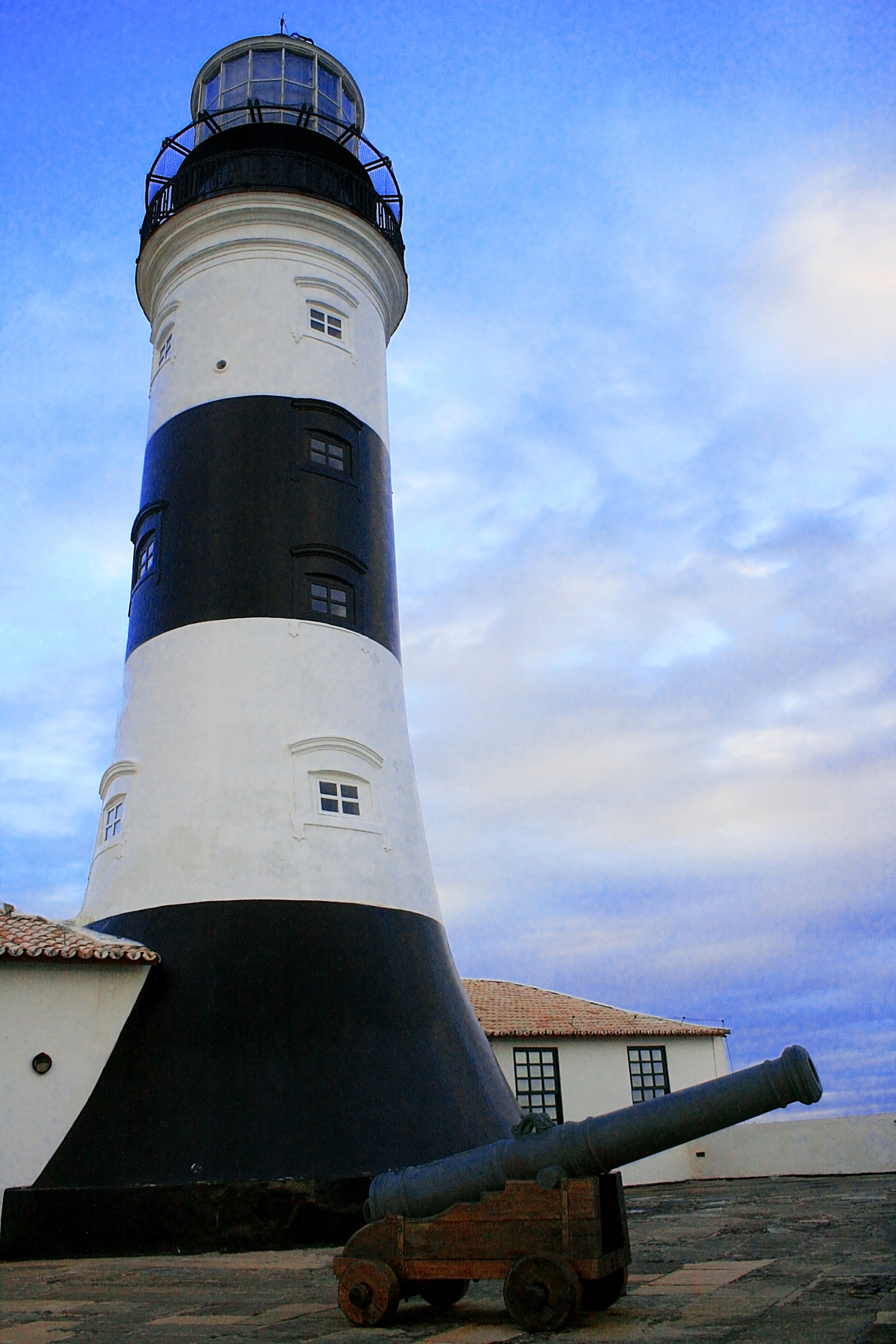
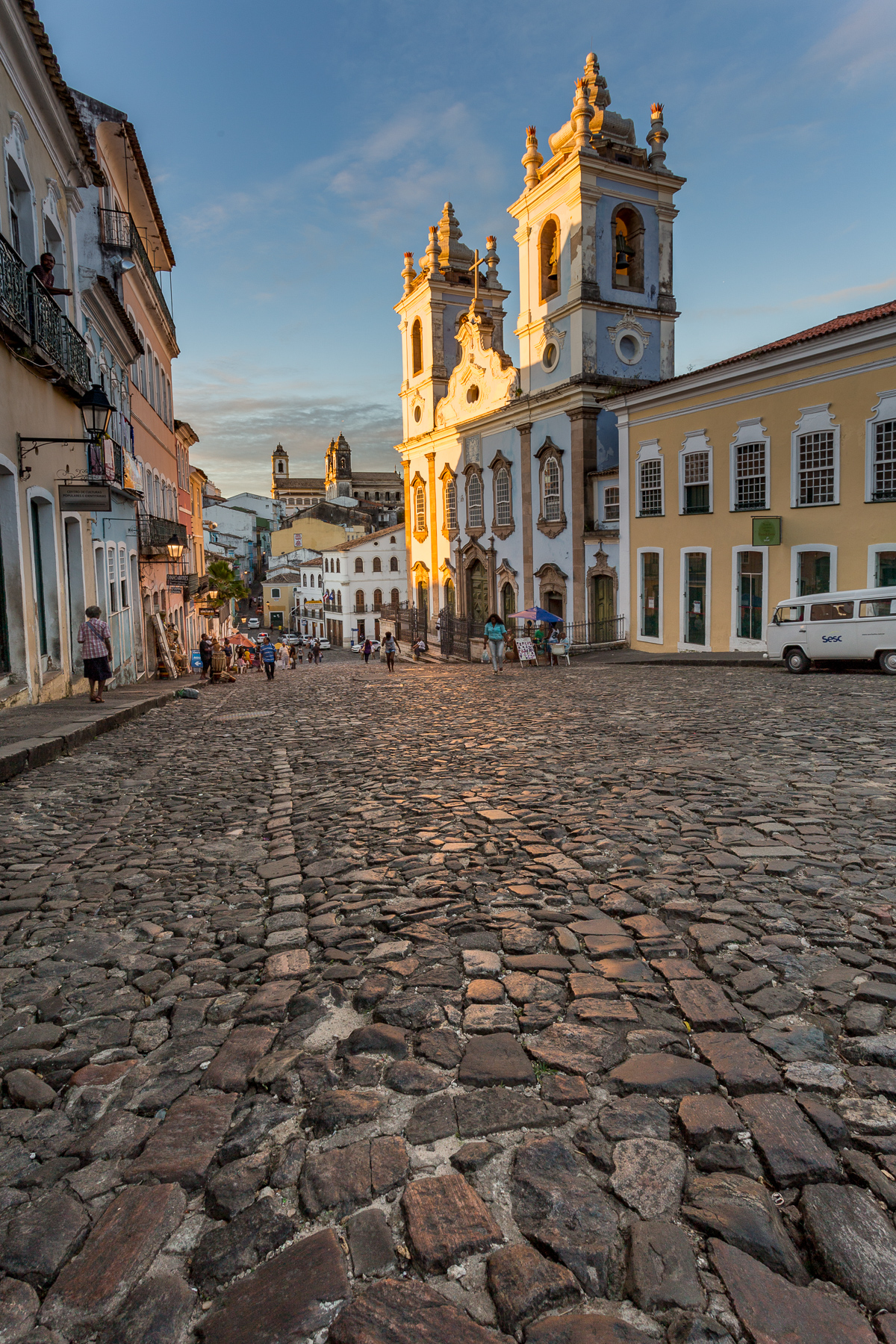
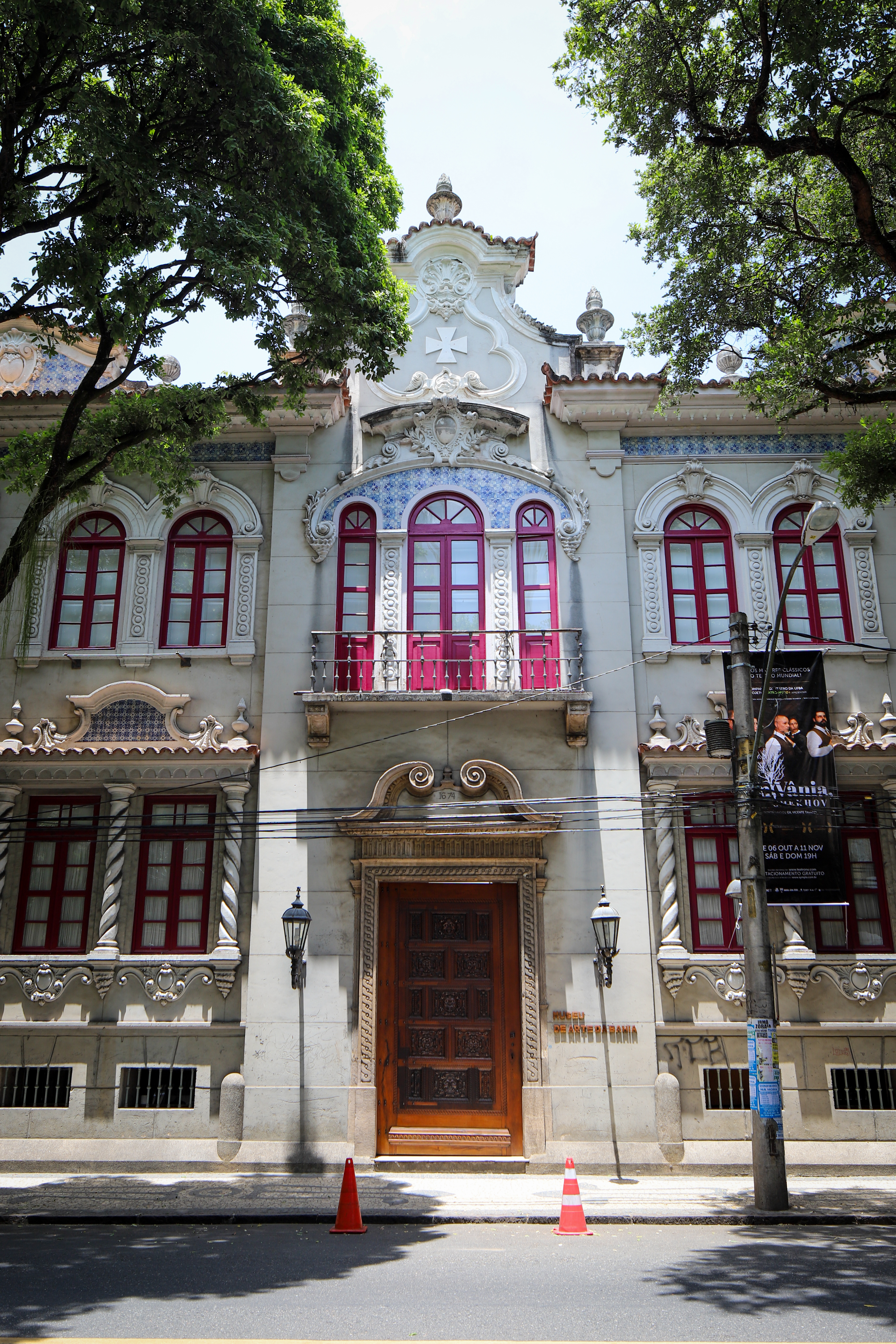
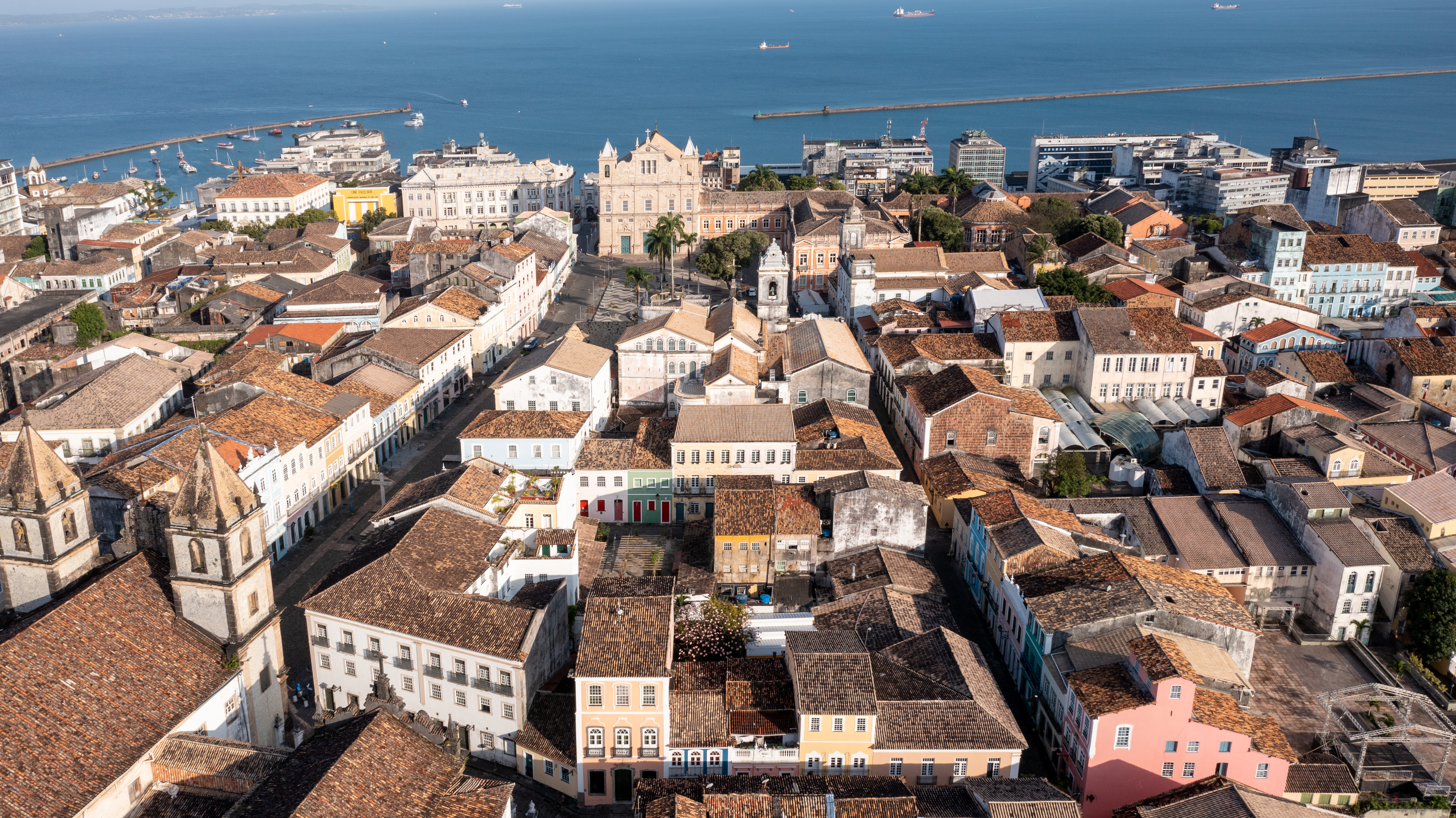
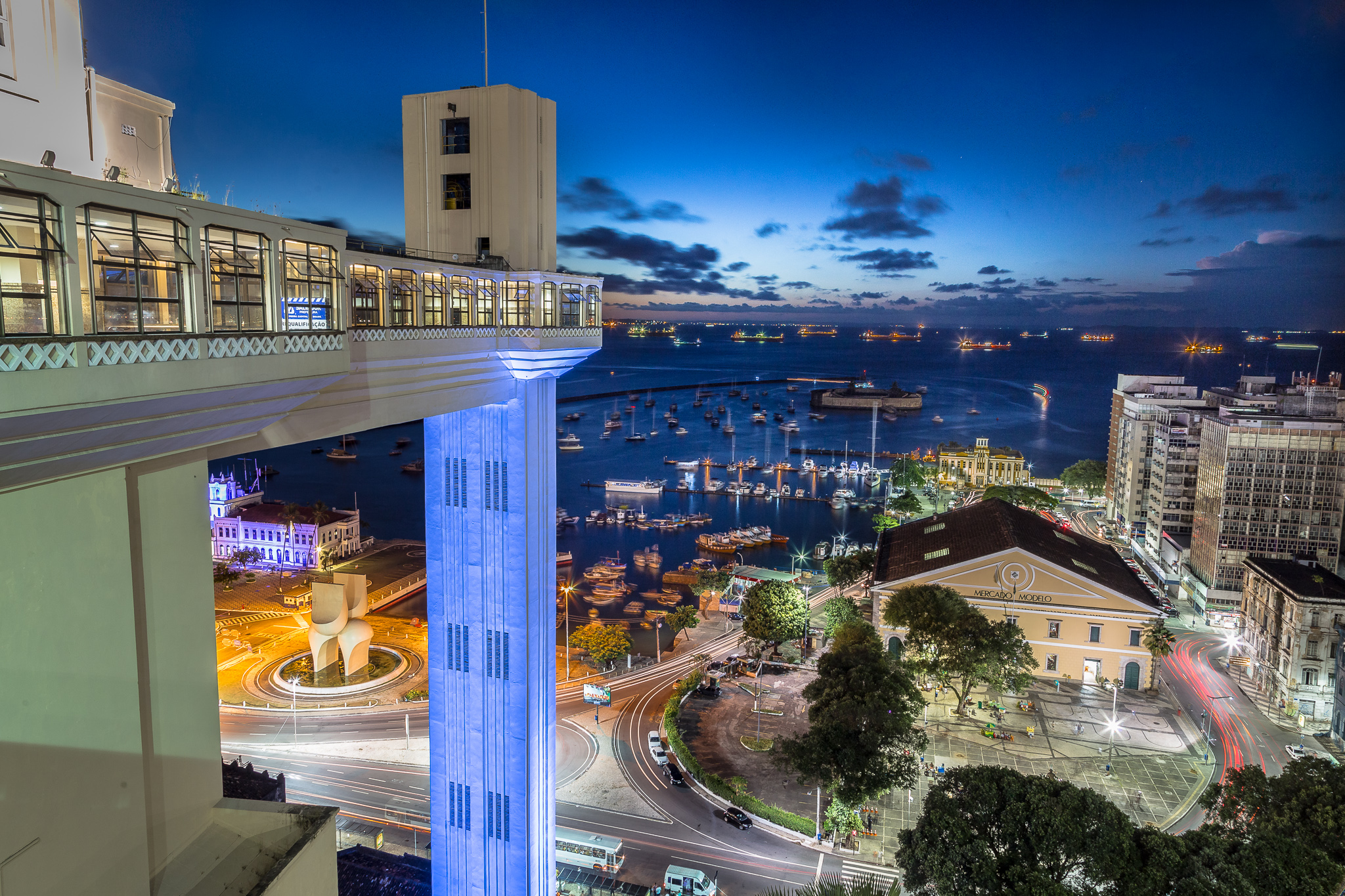
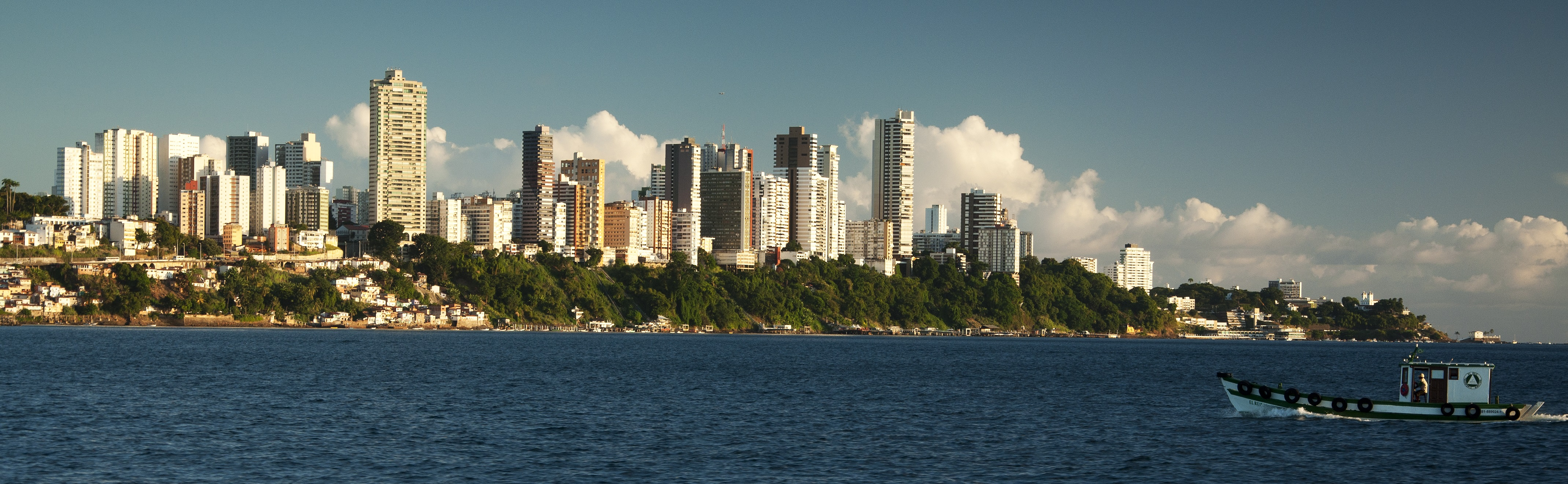
- Skyline of Salvador from Barra Barra Lighthouse Pelourinho Bahia Museum of Art Historic Center Lacerda Elevator Panoramic view of the Vitória neighborhood

- Flag Coat of arms
- Nicknames: Roma Negra ("Black Rome") and Soterópolis ("Savior City", by translating "Salvador" into Greek)
- Motto: Sic illa ad arcam reversa est (Latin) "So she returned to the ark"
- Interactive map of Salvador
- Location in Brazil Salvador (South America)
- Coordinates: 12°58′29″S 38°28′36″W
- Country: Brazil
- Region: Northeast
- State: Bahia
- Founded: 29 March 1549

Government
  - Type: Mayor–council
  - Body: Municipal Chamber of Salvador
  - Mayor: Bruno Soares Reis (UNIÃO)
  - Vice Mayor: Ana Paula Matos (PDT)

Area
  - Municipality: 693 km^{2} (268 sq mi)
  - Water: 66.91 km^{2} (25.83 sq mi)
  - Metro: 4,375.123 km^{2} (1,689.244 sq mi)
- Elevation: 8 m (26 ft)

Population (2025)
  - Municipality: 2,564,204
  - Rank: (5th)
  - Density: 4,187/km^{2} (10,840/sq mi)
  - Urban: 3,524,213
  - Metro: 3,919,864 (7th)
  - Metro density: 891.3/km^{2} (2,308/sq mi)
  - Seat/City: 2,564,204
- Demonym: Portuguese: Soteropolitano/a English: Soteropolitan

Metropolitan GDP (PPP, constant 2015 values)
  - Year: 2023
  - Total: $49.0 billion
  - Per capita: $12,700
- Time zone: UTC−3 (BRT)
- Postal code: 40000-001 to 42599-999
- Area code: +55 71
- HDI (2010): 0.759 – high
- Website: www.salvador.ba.gov.br (in Portuguese)

UNESCO World Heritage Site
- Official name: Historic Center of Salvador de Bahia
- Criteria: Cultural: (iv)(vi)
- Reference: 309
- Inscription: 1985 (9th Session)

Salvador (Brazilian Portuguese: [sawvaˈdoʁ], local pronunciation: [-ˈdo(h)], formerly known as Cidade do São Salvador da Bahia de Todos os Santos, literally "City of the Holy Savior of the Bay of All the Saints") is the capital and largest city of the Brazilian state of Bahia. Situated in the Zona da Mata in the Northeast Region of Brazil, Salvador is recognized throughout the country and internationally for its cuisine, music, and architecture. The African influence in many cultural aspects of the city makes it a center of Afro-Brazilian culture. As the first capital of Colonial Brazil, the city is one of the oldest in the Americas. Its foundation in 1549 by Tomé de Sousa took place on account of the implementation of the General Government of Brazil by the Portuguese Empire.

Centralization as a capital, along with Portuguese colonization, were important factors in shaping the profile of the municipality, as were certain geographic characteristics. The construction of the city followed the uneven topography, initially with the formation of two levels—Upper Town (Cidade Alta) and Lower Town (Cidade Baixa)—on a steep escarpment, and later with the conception of valley avenues. With 692.818 km^{2} (267.499 square miles) in area, its emerged territory is peninsular, and the coast is bordered by the Bay of All Saints to the west and the Atlantic Ocean to the east. The Historic Center of Salvador, iconized on the outskirts of Pelourinho, is known for its colonial architecture, with historical monuments dating from the 17th century to the beginning of the 20th century, and was declared a World Heritage Site by UNESCO in 1985. The stage of one of the biggest Carnivals in the world (the biggest street party in the world, according to the Guinness World Records), the integration of the municipality to the UNESCO's Creative Cities Network as the "City of Music", a unique title in the country, added to the international recognition of Salvador's music.

With more than 2.4 million inhabitants as of 2020, it is the most populous municipality in the Northeast, the fifth most-populous city in Brazil, and the ninth largest Latin American city. It is the core of the metropolitan area known as "Great Salvador", which had an estimated 3,957,123 inhabitants in 2020 according to the Brazilian Institute of Geography and Statistics (IBGE). This makes it the second most populous metropolitan area in the Northeast, the seventh in Brazil, and one of the largest in South America. Also due to these urban-population dimensions, it is classified by the IBGE study on the Brazilian urban network as a regional metropolis. In its reports for the years 2014 and 2020, the Research Network of Globalization and World Cities (GaWC) classified Salvador as a global city in the "Sufficiency" category (the smallest). Global city surveys by consultancy Kearney also included Salvador in the 2018 and 2020 annual reports, while excluding it in the 2019.

The economic center of the state, Salvador is also a port city, administrative and tourist center. Its metropolitan region has the highest GDP among urban concentrations in the Northeast. In 2018, it had the second-highest gross domestic product (GDP) among Northeastern municipalities. Furthermore, it is the headquarters of important regional, national and international companies, such as Novonor, Braskem, Neoenergy Coelba, and Suzano Papel e Celulose. In addition to companies, the city hosts or has hosted many cultural, political, educational, sports events and organizations, such as the Bahia State University, the Federal University of Bahia, the Brazilian Army Complementary Training School, the Brazilian Surfing Confederation, the 12th United Nations Congress on Crime Prevention and Criminal Justice (in 2010), the third Ibero-American Summit (in 1993), the 2003 Pan-American Judo Championship, the second Conference of Intellectuals from Africa and the Diaspora (in 2006), the 1989 Copa América, the 2013 FIFA Confederations Cup, the 2014 FIFA World Cup, and Group E of the women's football tournament in the 2016 Summer Olympics.

== History ==
Historical Affiliations

Portuguese Empire 1549–1815
Dutch Brazil 1624–1625
United Kingdom of Portugal, Brazil and the Algarves 1815–1823
Empire of Brazil 1823–1889
Republic of Brazil 1889–present

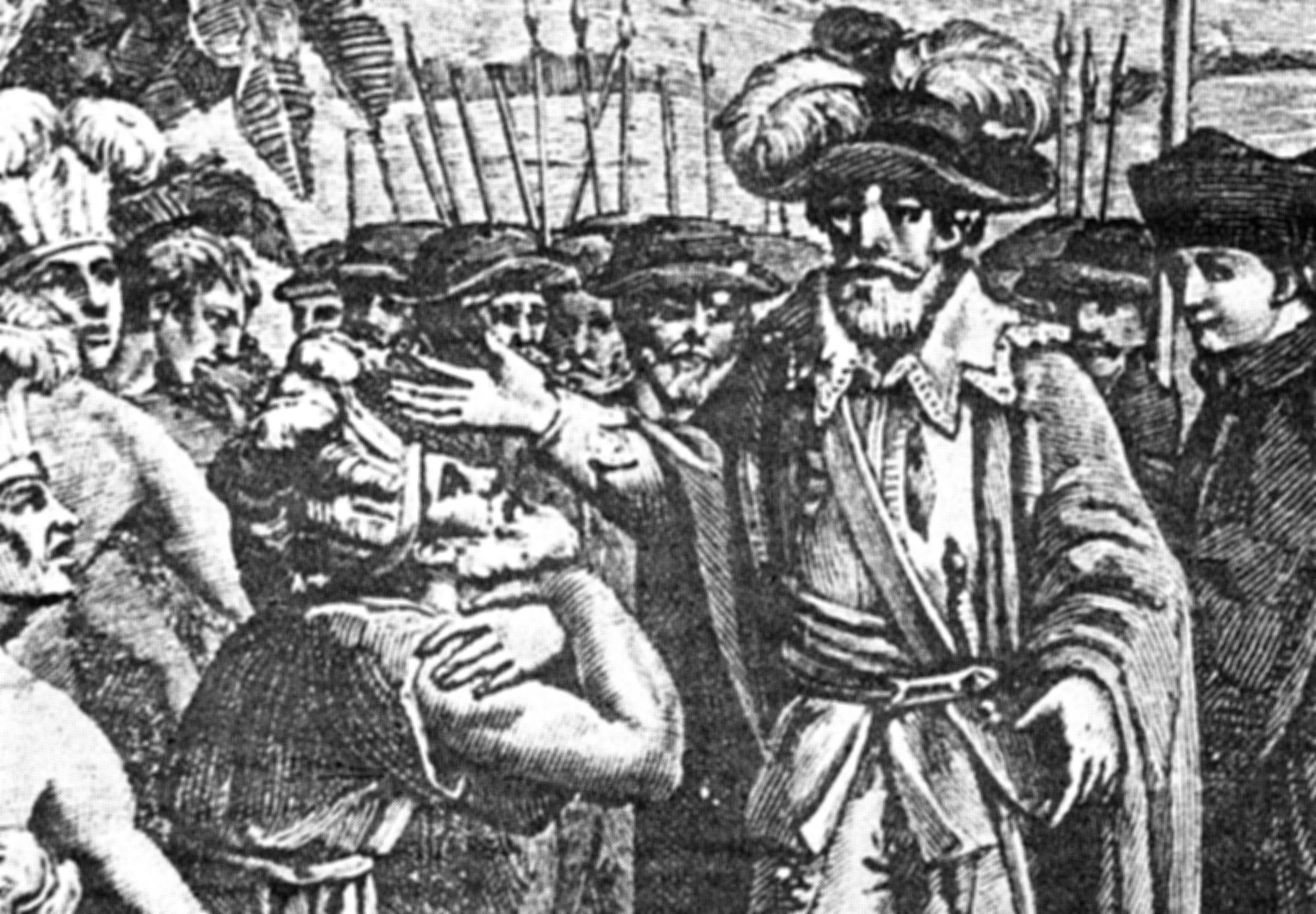
Tomé de Sousa arrives in Bahia, 16th century.

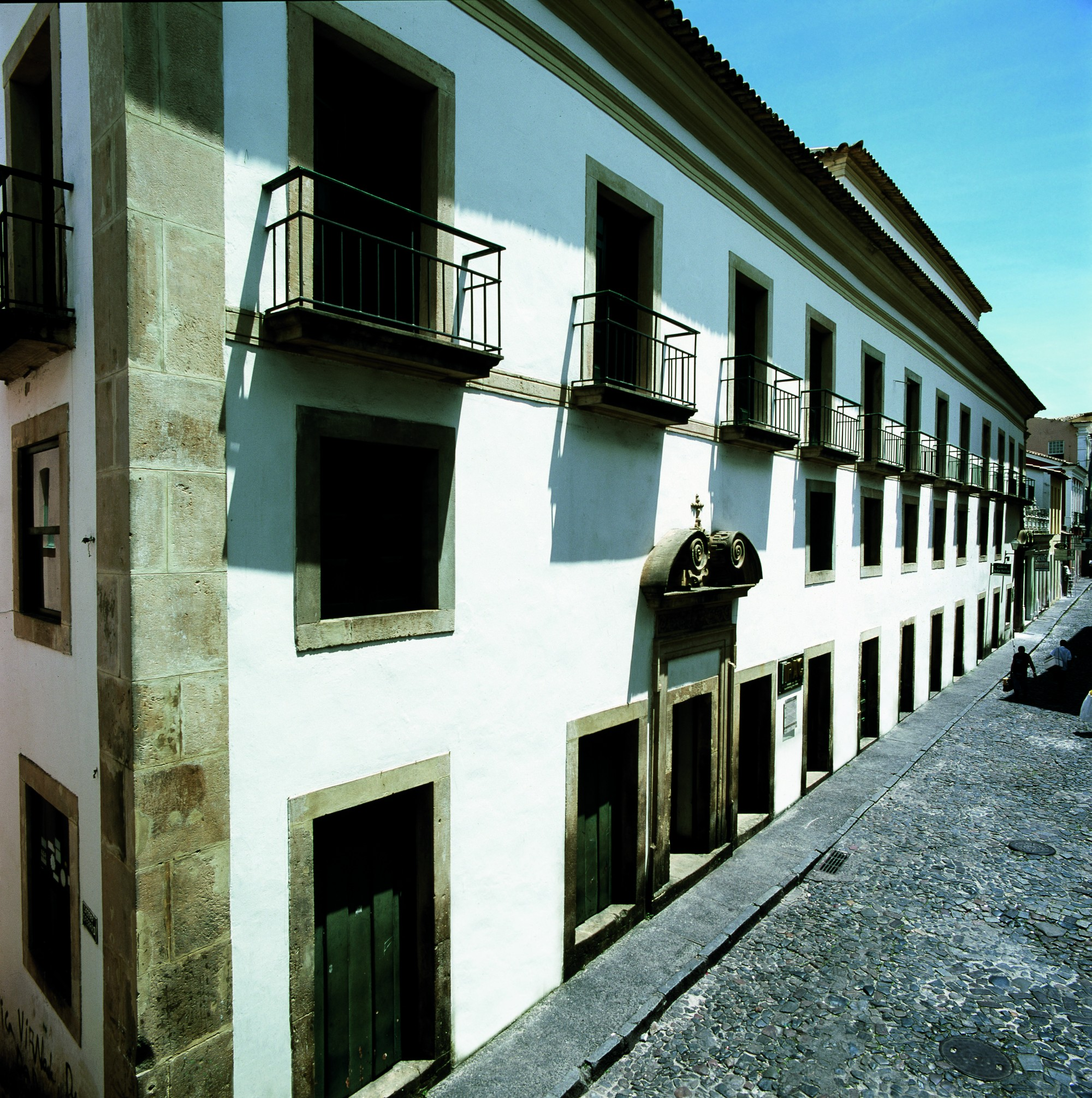
Solar Ferrão in Pelourinho

Dutch fleet commanded by Piet Pieterszoon Hein in Salvador during the unsuccessful 1624 invasion.

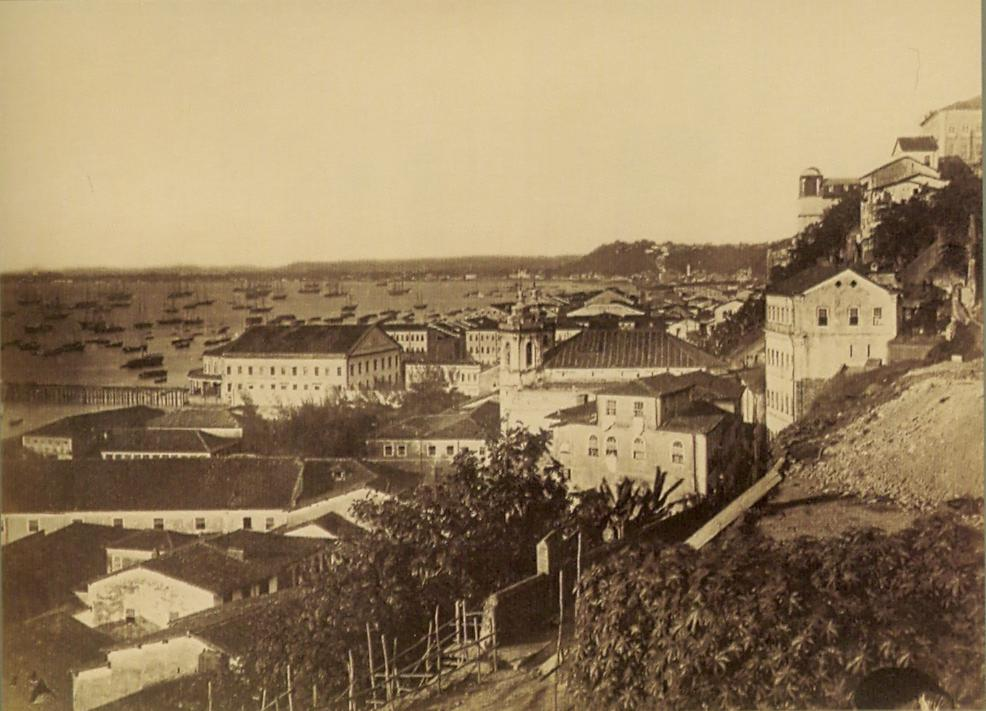
Salvador in 1875 during the Empire of Brazil.

Salvador lies on a small, roughly triangular peninsula that separates the Bay of All Saints, the largest bay in Brazil, from the Atlantic Ocean. It was first reached by Gaspar de Lemos in 1501, just one year after Cabral's purported discovery of Brazil. During his second voyage for Portugal, the Italian explorer Amerigo Vespucci sighted the bay on All Saints' Day (1 November) 1502 and, in honor of the date and his parish church in Florence, he named it the Bay of the Saint Savior of All the Saints.

The first European to settle nearby was Diogo Álvares Correia ("Caramuru"), who was shipwrecked off the end of the peninsula in 1509. He lived among the Tupinambá, marrying Guaibimpara and others. In 1531, Martim Afonso de Sousa led an expedition from Mount St Paul (Morro de São Paulo) and, in 1534, Francisco Pereira Coutinho, the first captain of Bahia, established the settlement of Pereira in modern Salvador's Ladeira da Barra neighborhood. Mistreatment of the Tupinambá by the settlers caused them to turn hostile and the Portuguese were forced to flee to Porto Seguro c. 1546. An attempted restoration of the colony the next year ended in shipwreck and cannibalism.

The present city was established as the fortress of São Salvador da Bahia de Todos os Santos ("Holy Savior of the Bay of All Saints") (Note: As late as the 19th century, it was also known in English as San Salvador, although the general name continued to be "Bahia".) in 1549 by Portuguese settlers under Tomé de Sousa, Brazil's first governor-general. It is one of the oldest cities founded by Europeans in the Americas. From a cliff overlooking the Bay of All Saints, (Note: Its exact position remains a matter of debate.) it served as Brazil's first capital and quickly became a major port for its slave trade and sugarcane industry. Salvador was long divided into an upper and a lower city, divided by a sharp escarpment some 85 meters (279 ft) high. The upper city formed the administrative, religious, and primary residential districts while the lower city was the commercial center, with a port and market.

In the Roman Catholic Church, Brazil and the rest of the Portuguese Empire were initially administered as part of the Diocese of Funchal in Portugal but, in 1551, Salvador became the seat of the first Roman Catholic diocese erected in Brazil. The first parish church was the mud-and-thatch Church of Our Lady of Help (Igreja da Nossa Senhora da Ajuda) erected by the Jesuits (Society of Jesus), (Note: This church was first rebuilt in stone and mortar in 1579 and then demolished in 1912 to widen a road. The present Church of Our Lady of Help is located a block away from the original site.) which served as the first cathedral of the diocese until the Jesuits finished construction of the original basilica on the Terreiro de Jesus in 1553. (Note: This basilica was later rebuilt from 1656 to 1672.) Its bishop was made independent of the Archdiocese of Lisbon at the request of King Pedro II in 1676; he served as the primate of the Congo and Angola in central Africa until the elevation of the Diocese of Luanda on 13 January 1844 and its bishop still serves as the national primate and premier see (diocese) of Brazil.

In 1572, the Governorate of Brazil was divided into the separate governorates of Bahia in the north and Rio de Janeiro in the south. These were reunited as Brazil six years later, then redivided from 1607 to 1613. By that time, Portugal had become temporarily united with Spain and was ruled from Madrid by its kings. In 1621, King Philip III replaced the Governorate of Brazil with the states of Brazil, still based in Salvador and now controlling the south, and the Maranhão, which was centered on São Luís and controlled what is now northern Brazil. As Spain was then prosecuting a war against the independence of the Dutch, the Dutch East and West India companies tried to conquer Brazil from them. Salvador played a strategically vital role against Dutch Brazil, but was captured and sacked by a West India Company fleet under Jacob Willekens and Piet Hein on 10 May 1624. Johan van Dorth administered the colony before his assassination, freeing its slaves. The city was recaptured by a Luso-Spanish fleet under Fadrique Álvarez de Toledo y Mendoza on 1 May 1625. John Maurice, Prince of Nassau-Siegen, tried to conquer the city for his country, unsuccessfully besieging it between April and May 1638.

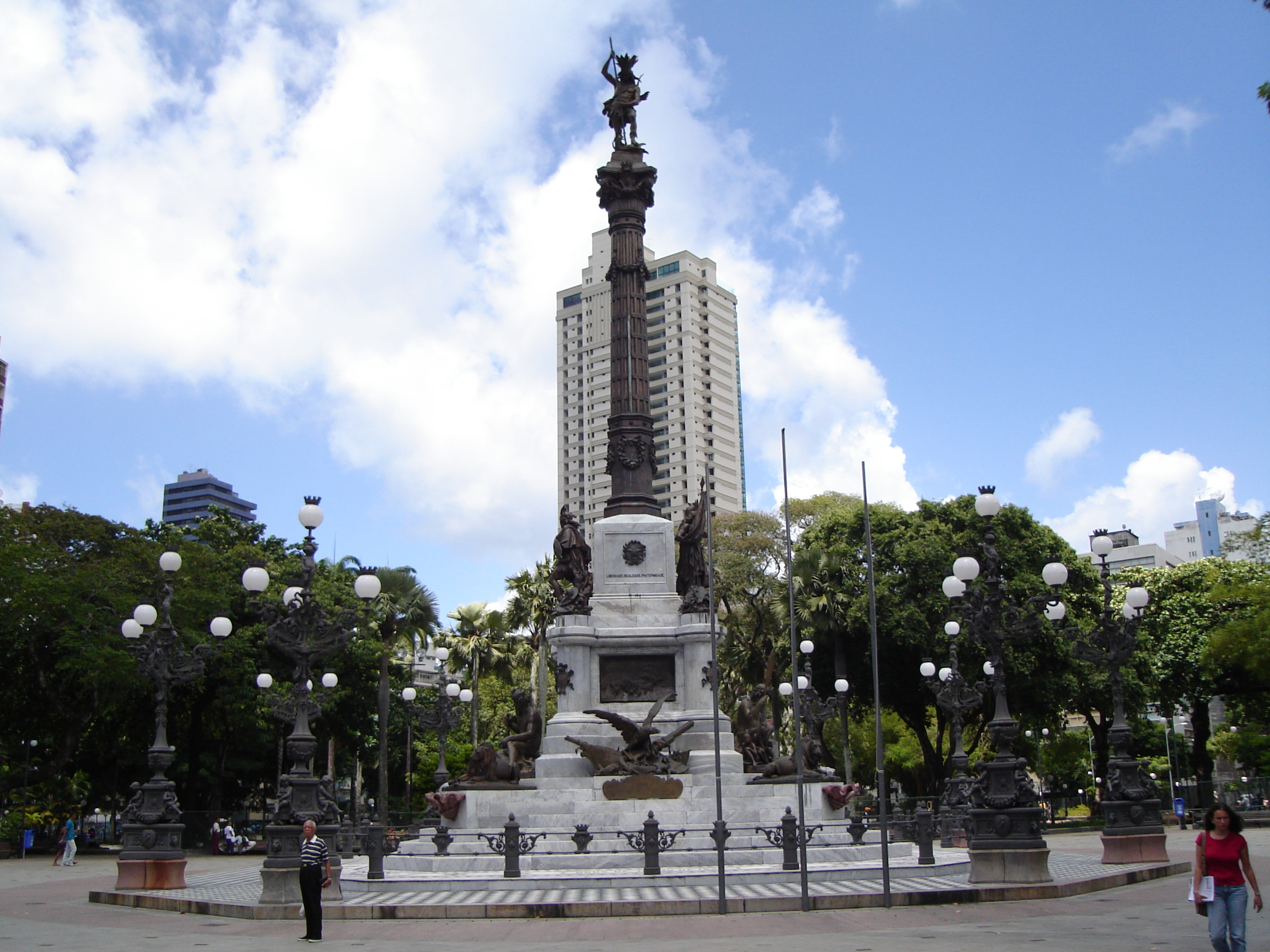
Monument dedicated to the heroes of the battles of Bahia's independence from Portugal in the Campo Grande Square

In 1763, the colonial administration was removed to Rio de Janeiro and elevated to a viceroyalty. Salvador remained the heart of the Recôncavo, Bahia's rich agricultural maritime district, but was largely outside Brazil's early modernization. The area formed a center of royal Portuguese support against heir apparent Pedro I's declaration of independence from European Portugal on 7 September 1822. Its elites initially remained loyal to the Portuguese crown while rebels from Cachoeira besieged them for a year until finally receiving Portugal's surrender of the town on 2 July 1823, which is now celebrated as Bahia Independence Day. The local elite was similarly hesitant during Manuel Deodoro da Fonseca's later coup that established the republic in 1889.

In 1835, the Malê revolt, a slave revolt of Muslim enslaved Africans took place, which was Brazil's largest such event and contributed to the idea of the abolition of slavery in Brazil—which took until 1888, when Isabel, Princess Imperial of Brazil, promulgated the Lei Áurea ("Golden Act").

Owing to whales' use of the Bay of All Saints as a mating ground, Salvador became a large whaling port in the Southern Hemisphere during the 19th century but the trade had already begun to fall off by the 1870s.

Under the empire and republic periods, however, the town slowly began to industrialize. In 1873, Brazil's first elevator, the powerful hydraulic Elevador Lacerda, was constructed to connect the city's upper and lower towns. Having undergone several upgrades, it continues in use. By the First World War, it was joined by a second elevator (Note: The development of the tramways and elevators, however, ended a long-running trade for porters and chairmen carrying people and goods up the steep staircase streets of the escarpment.) and Salvador was connected to four railroads: the Bahia & Alagoinhas to Joazeiro, the Bahia Central, the Nazareth Tramway, and a short line to Santo Amaro. Its central districts and the major suburbs of Bomfim and Victoria were served by four streetcar lines, which had begun to electrify. It also served as a port of call for most steamship lines trading between Europe and South America.

In 1985, UNESCO listed the city's Pelourinho neighborhood as a World Heritage Site. In the 1990s, a major municipal project cleaned and restored the neighborhood in order to develop it as the cultural center and heart of the city's tourist trade. The development of the Historical Center, however, involved the forced removal of thousands of working-class residents and now necessitates local and municipal events in order to attract people to the area. The relocated workers, meanwhile, have encountered significant economic hardship in their new homes on the city's periphery, separated from access to work and civic amenities.

In 2007, Porto da Barra Beach in Barra was named by the Guardian as the 3rd-best beach in the world. In 2010, the city hosted the 12th UN Congress on Crime Prevention. The city hosted the 2013 Confederations Cup and was one of the host cities of the 2014 FIFA World Cup in Brazil at its Arena Fonte Nova. As part of its preparations for the World Cup, the city re-established its public transportation lines as the Salvador Metro.

== Geography ==
Location of Salvador on a map of municipalities of Bahia

=== Climate ===
Salvador has a trade-wind tropical rainforest climate (Köppen: Af). Temperatures are relatively consistent, showing little variance throughout the course of the year. Salvador's driest months of the year are December and January, when the city receives on average less than 10 cm (4 in) of precipitation. Salvador's wettest months are April, May and June, when at least 20 cm (8 in) of rain falls during each of these three months.

Climate data for Salvador (Bahia) 1991–2020 normals, extremes 1911–present
Month	Jan	Feb	Mar	Apr	May	Jun	Jul	Aug	Sep	Oct	Nov	Dec	Year
Record high °C (°F)	34.3 (93.7)	34.7 (94.5)	37.0 (98.6)	34.5 (94.1)	31.6 (88.9)	30.6 (87.1)	30.7 (87.3)	31.3 (88.3)	30.7 (87.3)	33.5 (92.3)	33.5 (92.3)	34.3 (93.7)	37 (99)
Mean daily maximum °C (°F)	31.0 (87.8)	31.1 (88.0)	30.9 (87.6)	29.6 (85.3)	28.1 (82.6)	27.1 (80.8)	26.6 (79.9)	26.7 (80.1)	27.7 (81.9)	29.1 (84.4)	29.8 (85.6)	30.6 (87.1)	29.0 (84.2)
Daily mean °C (°F)	26.9 (80.4)	27.1 (80.8)	27.1 (80.8)	26.4 (79.5)	25.3 (77.5)	24.3 (75.7)	23.7 (74.7)	23.6 (74.5)	24.3 (75.7)	25.4 (77.7)	26.1 (79.0)	26.6 (79.9)	25.6 (78.1)
Mean daily minimum °C (°F)	23.8 (74.8)	24.0 (75.2)	24.1 (75.4)	23.6 (74.5)	22.8 (73.0)	21.9 (71.4)	21.1 (70.0)	21.0 (69.8)	21.5 (70.7)	22.5 (72.5)	23.1 (73.6)	23.5 (74.3)	22.7 (72.9)
Record low °C (°F)	19.8 (67.6)	19.5 (67.1)	18.7 (65.7)	18.7 (65.7)	18.0 (64.4)	18.2 (64.8)	17.5 (63.5)	17.7 (63.9)	17.6 (63.7)	18.3 (64.9)	18.9 (66.0)	19.8 (67.6)	17.5 (63.5)
Average precipitation mm (inches)	76.9 (3.03)	98.7 (3.89)	147.3 (5.80)	284.9 (11.22)	302.2 (11.90)	237.6 (9.35)	194.1 (7.64)	129.7 (5.11)	99.3 (3.91)	91.0 (3.58)	108.2 (4.26)	63.4 (2.50)	1,833.3 (72.18)
Average precipitation days (≥ 1.0 mm)	9	9	11	16	18	19	18	16	11	8	8	7	150
Average relative humidity (%)	78.7	79.4	80.6	83.3	85.1	84.9	83.4	82.1	81.2	80.0	80.4	79.3	81.5
Average dew point °C (°F)	22.6 (72.7)	22.9 (73.2)	23.1 (73.6)	23.0 (73.4)	22.1 (71.8)	21.1 (70.0)	20.1 (68.2)	19.8 (67.6)	20.3 (68.5)	21.3 (70.3)	22.0 (71.6)	22.4 (72.3)	21.7 (71.1)
Mean monthly sunshine hours	234.8	208.2	225.5	185.4	156.7	144.6	169.6	190.4	205.3	226.6	202.9	222.8	2,372.8
Source 1: Instituto Nacional de Meteorologia
Source 2: Meteo Climat (record highs and lows), Weather.Directory

== Demographics ==
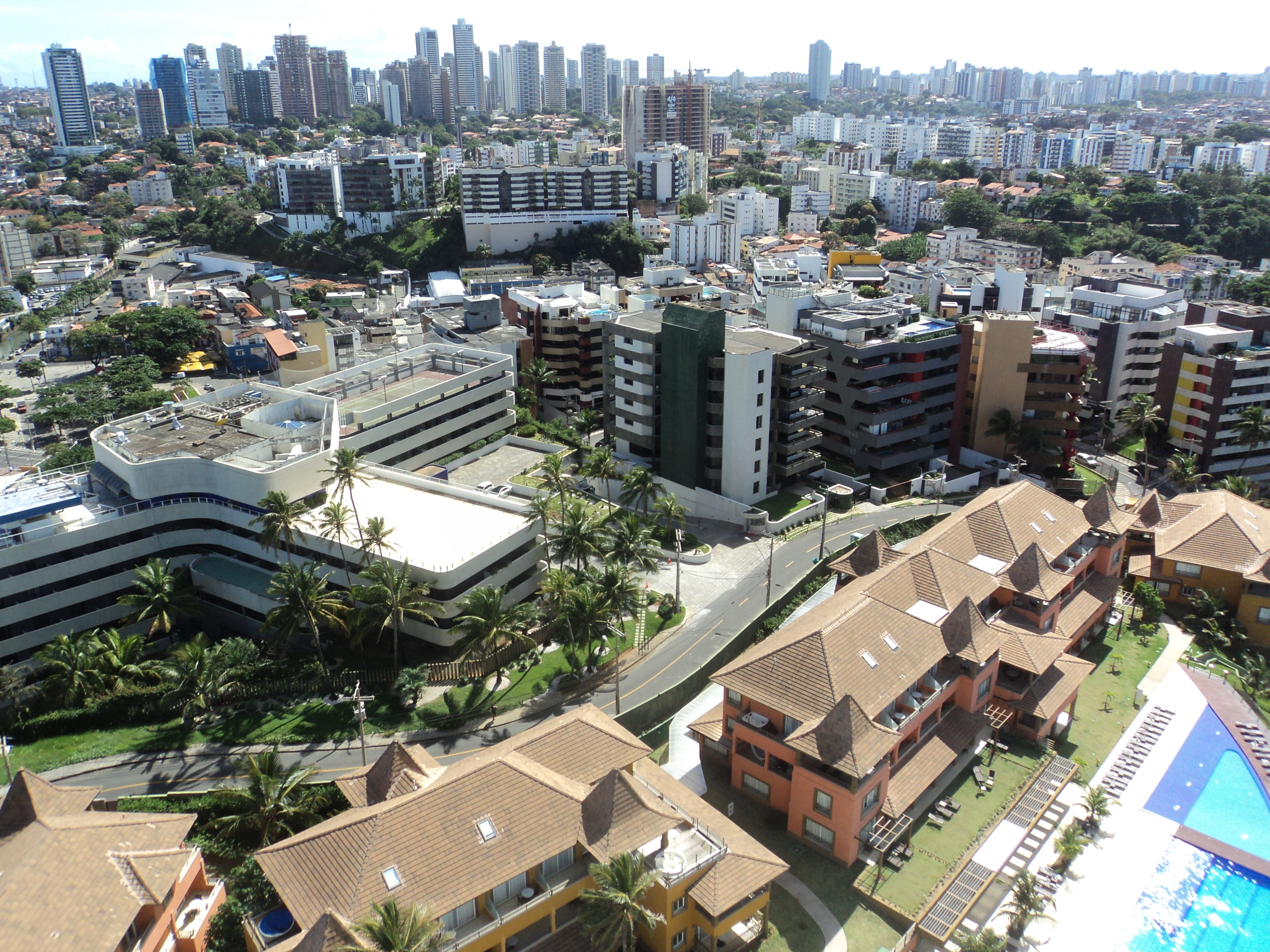
Rio Vermelho and Horto Florestal neighborhoods

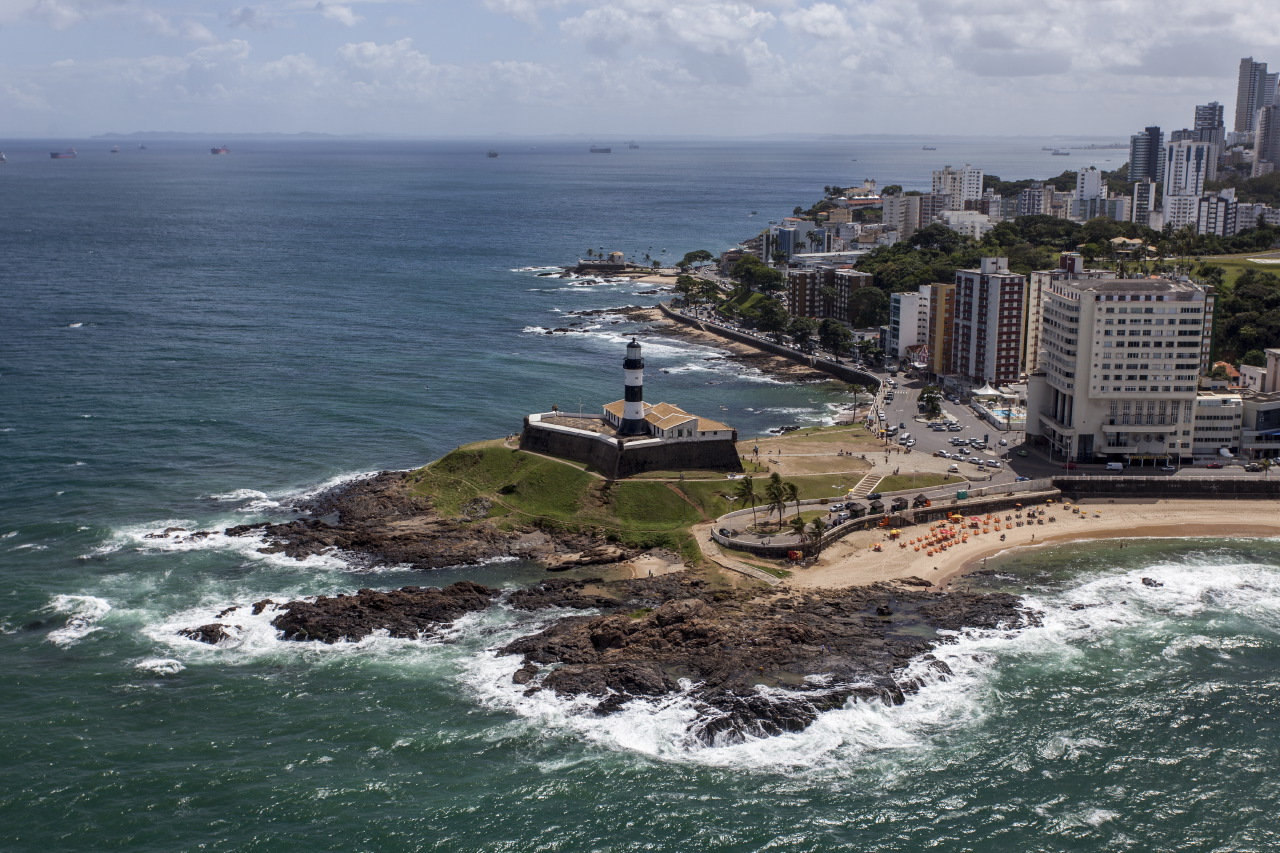
View of Farol da Barra Lighthouse

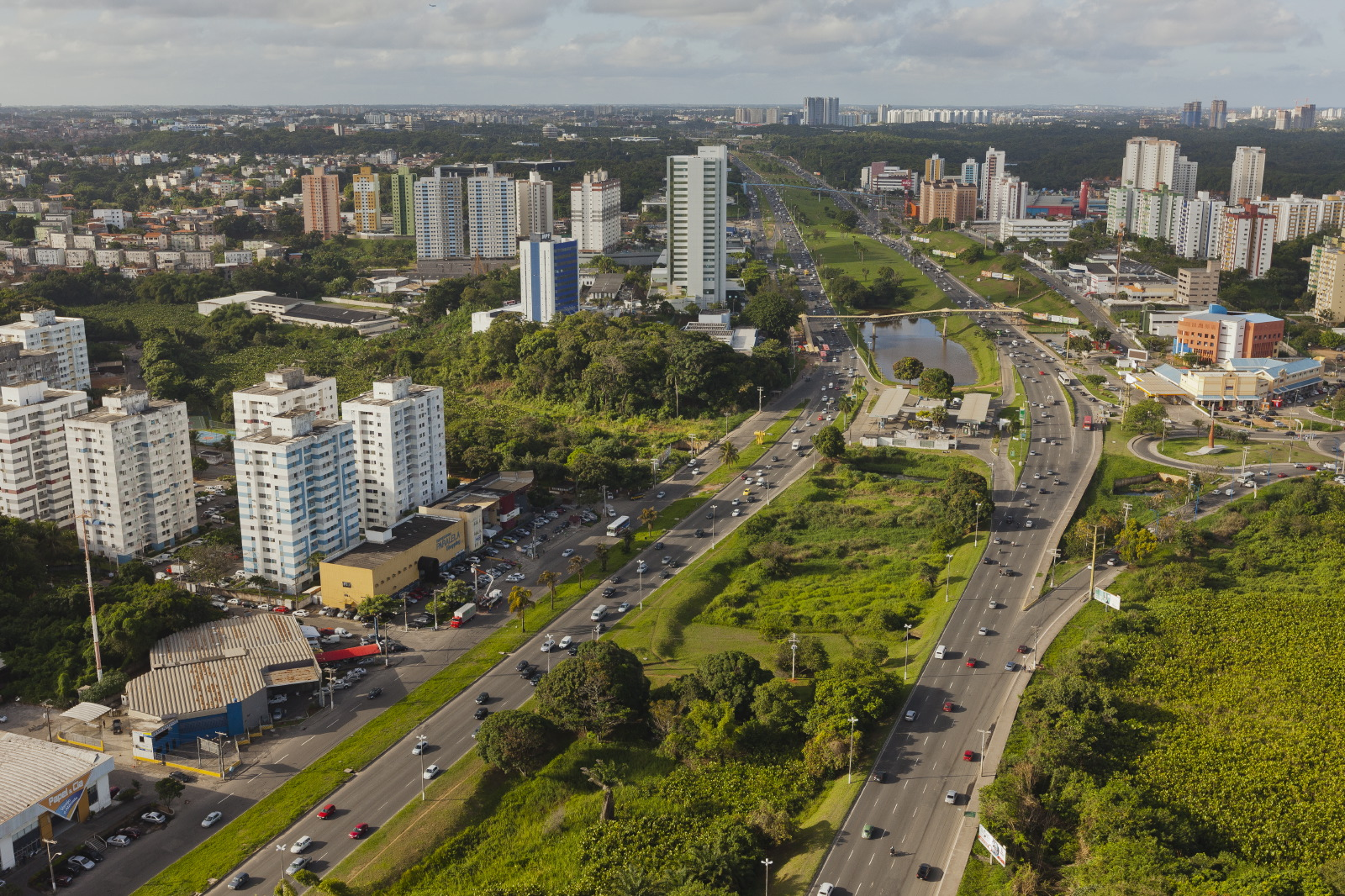
Luís Viana Avenue (also known as Paralela Avenue). It connects the Financial Center to the North Zone of city (airport).

In 2010, the city of Salvador was the third-most populous city in Brazil, after São Paulo and Rio de Janeiro. Currently, Salvador is the 5th largest city in Brazil in terms of population. The city had 474,827 opposite-sex couples and 1,595 same-sex couples. The population of Salvador was 53.3% female and 46.7% male.

=== Ethnic groups ===
Race and ethnicity in Salvador
Ethnicity	Percentage
Pardo (Multiracial)	49.1%
Black	34.1%
White	16.5%
Amerindian	0.2%
Asian	0.1%

According to the 2022 census, there were 2,417,678 people residing in the city of Salvador. The census revealed the following self-identification: 1,186,416 persons identify as Pardo (Multiracial) (49.1%); 825,509 as Black (34.1%); 398,688 as White (16.5%); and 4,395 as Amerindian (0.2%); 2,605 as Asian (0.1%).

Salvador's population is the result of 500 years of interracial marriage. The majority of the population has African, European and Native American roots. The African ancestry of the city is from Benin, Angola, Congo, Senegal and Mozambique.

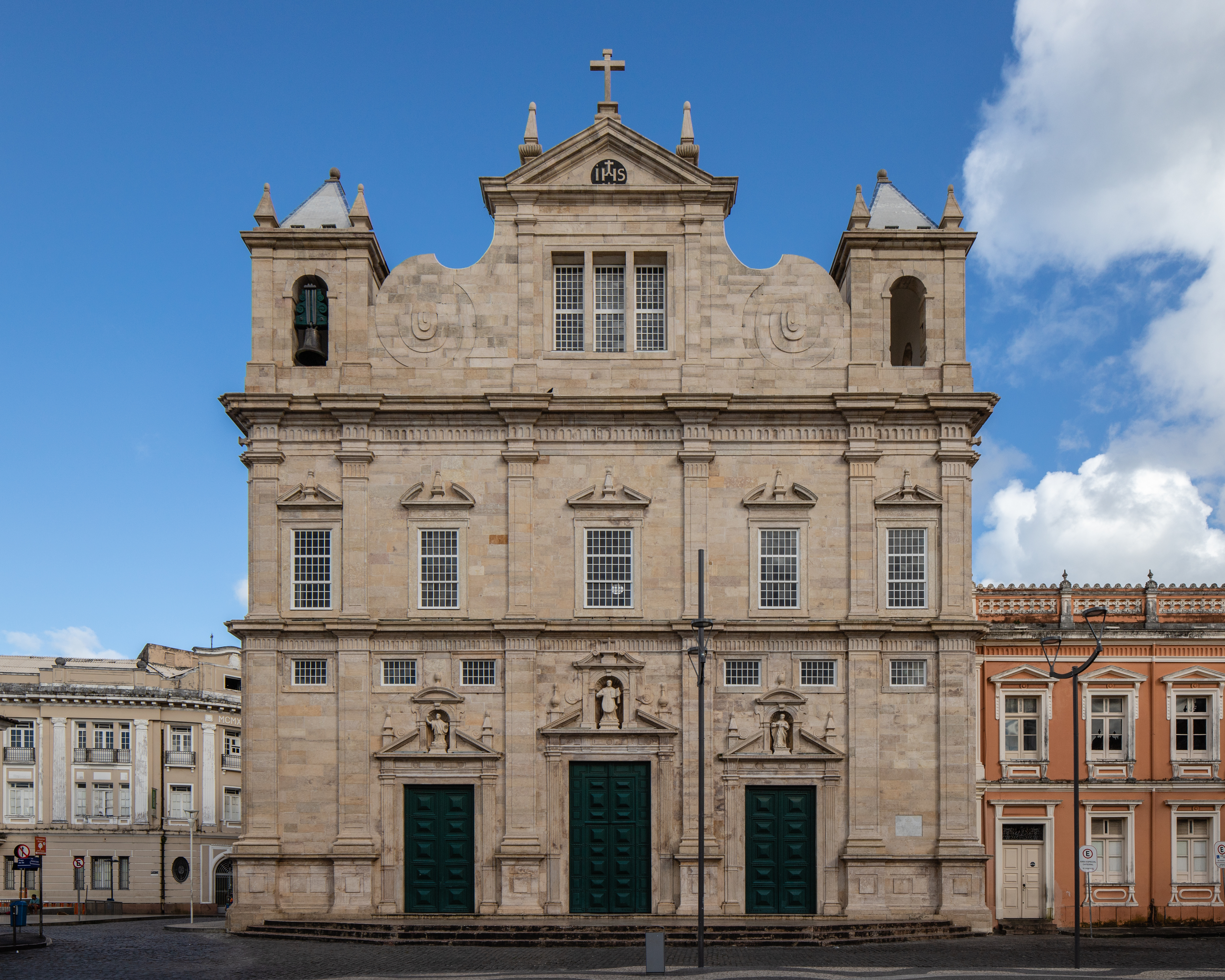
Mannerist Cathedral Basilica of Salvador, the Primate of Brazil (1657–1746)

According to an autosomal DNA study from 2008, the ancestral heritage of the population of Salvador was estimated to be 49.2% African, 36.3% European and 14.5% Native American. The study also analyzed the genetic backgrounds of people by type of surname. Those with surnames with a religious connotation were 53.1% African in genetic ancestry and tended to be in lower economic classes. During the colonial era, it was typical practice for Portuguese priests and missionaries to baptize converted African slaves and Native Americans with surnames of religious connotations. These have been passed down to their descendants.

A 2015 autosomal DNA study found out the following ancestral composition in Salvador: 50.5% of African ancestry, 42.4% of European ancestry and 5.8% of Native American ancestry. The researchers explained they oversampled individuals living in poor environments (page 4).

Another 2015 autosomal DNA found out Salvador to be 50.8% African, 42.9% European and 6.4% Native American.

And another autosomal DNA study, also in 2015, found out Salvador to be: 50.8% European, 40.5% African and 8.7% Native American.

=== Population growth ===
Changing demographics of the city of Salvador

Source: Planet Barsa Ltda.

=== Religion ===
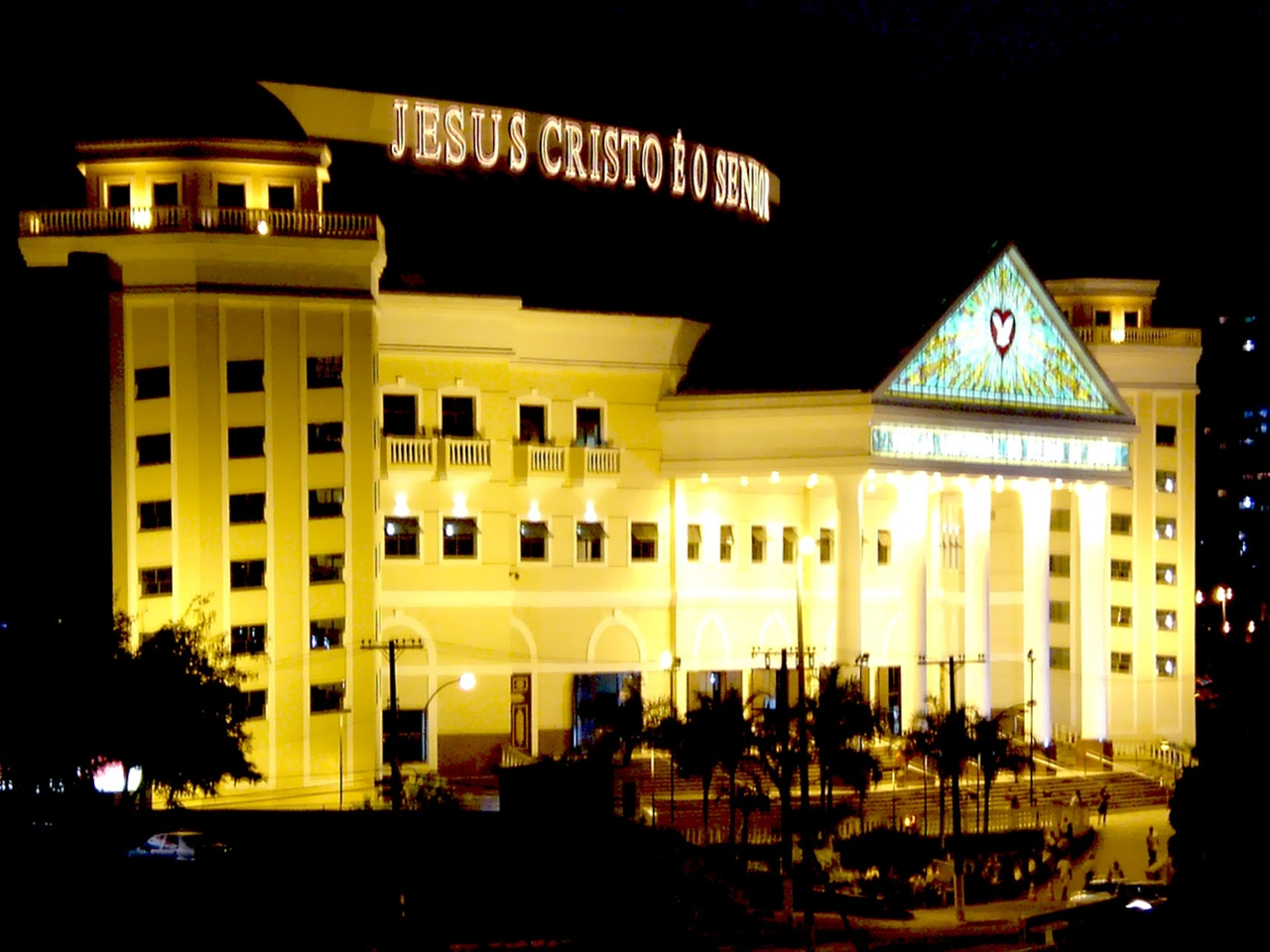
Protestant Church in Iguatemi neighborhood

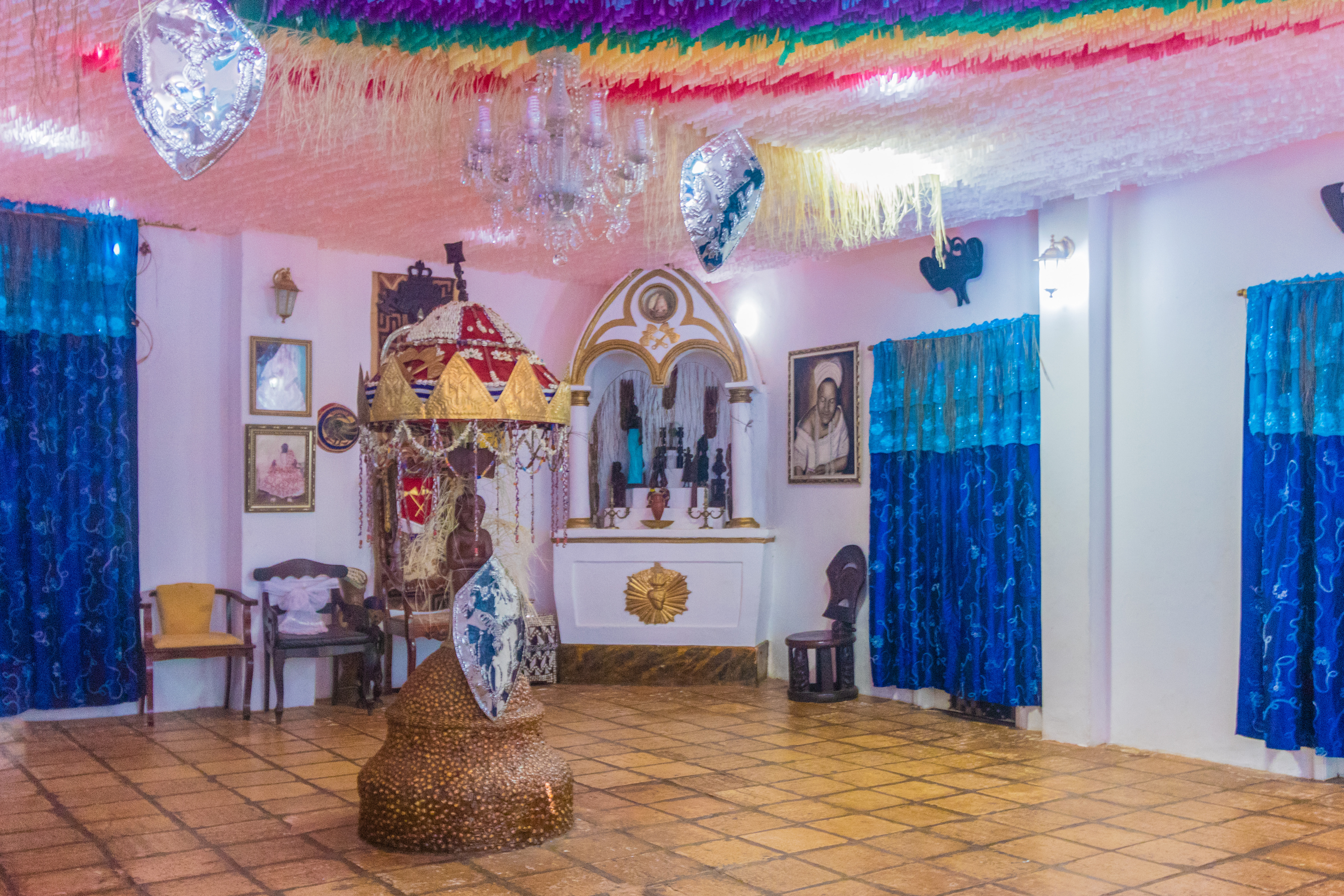
A temple of Afro-Brazilian religious expression in Salvador.

In Salvador, religion is a major contact point between Portuguese and African influences and, in the last 20 years, Brazil's version of a North American-influenced Pentecostalism. Salvador was the seat of the first bishopric in colonial Brazil (established 1551), and the first bishop, Pero Fernandes Sardinha, arrived already in 1552. The Jesuits, led by the Manuel da Nóbrega, also arrived in the 16th century and worked in converting the Indigenous peoples of the region to Roman Catholicism.

Many religious orders came to the city, following its foundation: Franciscans, Benedictines and Carmelites. Subsequently, to them are created the Third Orders, the Brotherhoods, and Fraternities, which were composed mainly of professional and social groups. The most prominent of these orders were the Terceira do Carmo Order and the de São Francisco Order, founded by white men, and the Nossa Senhora do Rosário and São Beneditino Brotherhoods, composed of black men. In many churches maintained by religious men, were housed the Santíssimo Sacramento brotherhoods.

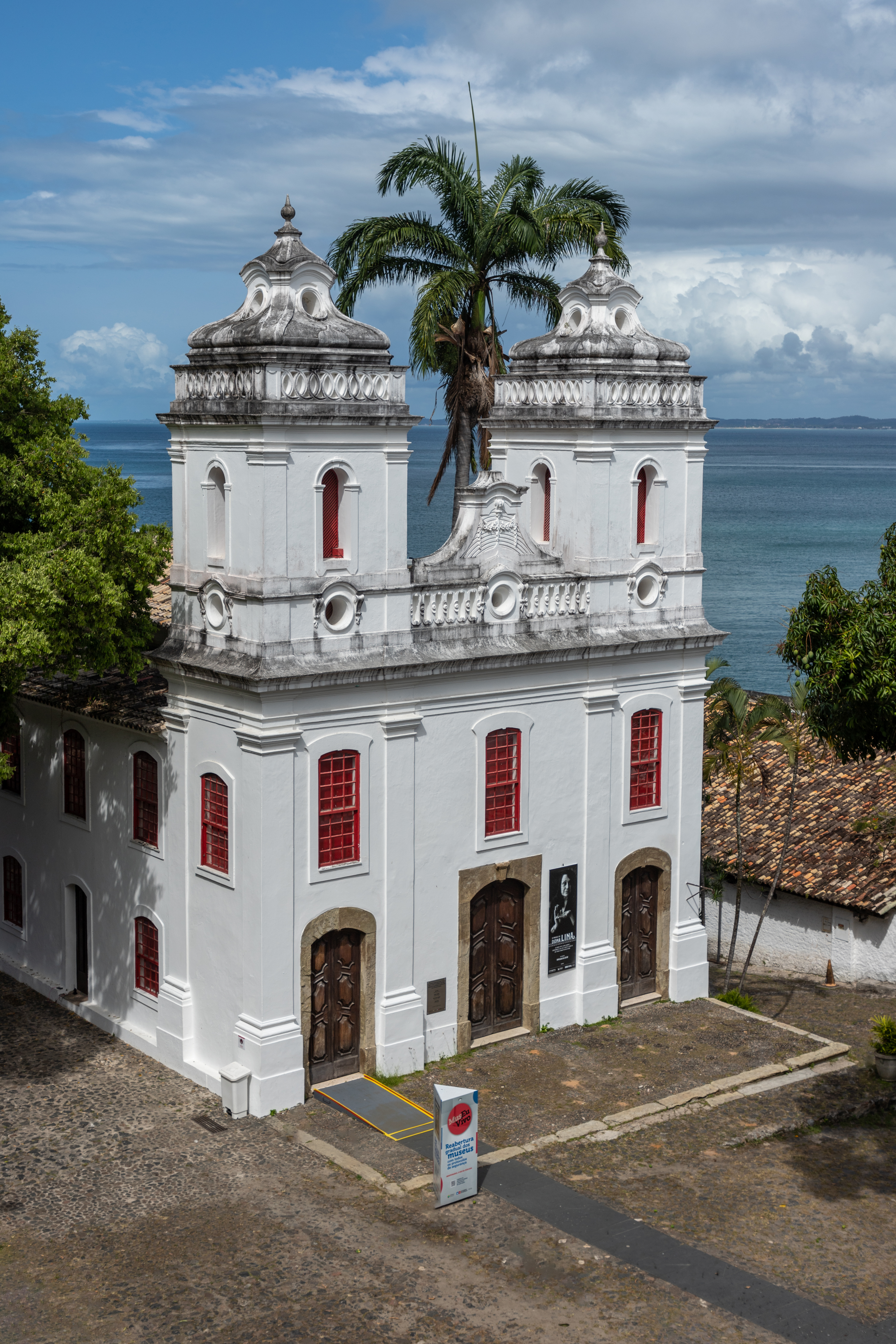
Capela de Nossa Senhora da Conceição, Solar do Unhão, Salvador, Bahia

Besides these organizations, the expansion of Catholicism in the city was consolidated through social care work. Santa Casa the Misericórdia was one of the institution that did this kind of work, maintaining hospitals, shelters for the poor and the elderly, as well providing assistance to convicts and to those who would face death penalties. The convents, on their part, were cultural and religious formation centers, offering seminar coursed that often were attended by the lay.

Even with the present evolution, and the growth of Protestantism and other religions in the city, the Catholic faith remains as one of its most distinctive features, drawing a lot of people to its hundreds of churches. Some aspects, like the use of Portuguese in the Masses, the simplification of the liturgy, and the adoption of "pop" religious songs are key factors to the triumph of Catholicism. In the Nossa Senhora do Rosário dos Pretos Church, Masses are held in the Yorùbá language, making use of African chants and typical clothes, which attract many people from the African Brazilian communities.

Most enslaved Africans in Bahia were brought from Sub-Saharan Africa, especially the Yorùbá-speaking nation (Iorubá or Nagô in Portuguese) from present-day Benin. The enslaved were forced to convert to Roman Catholicism, but their original religion Yorùbá was combined with Roman Catholicism to create the syncretic religion known as Candomblé, which has survived in spite of prohibitions and persecutions. The enslaved Africans managed to preserve their religion by attributing the names and characteristics of their Yorùbá deities to Catholic saints with similar qualities. Still today all Candomble sessions are conducted in Yoruba, not Portuguese.

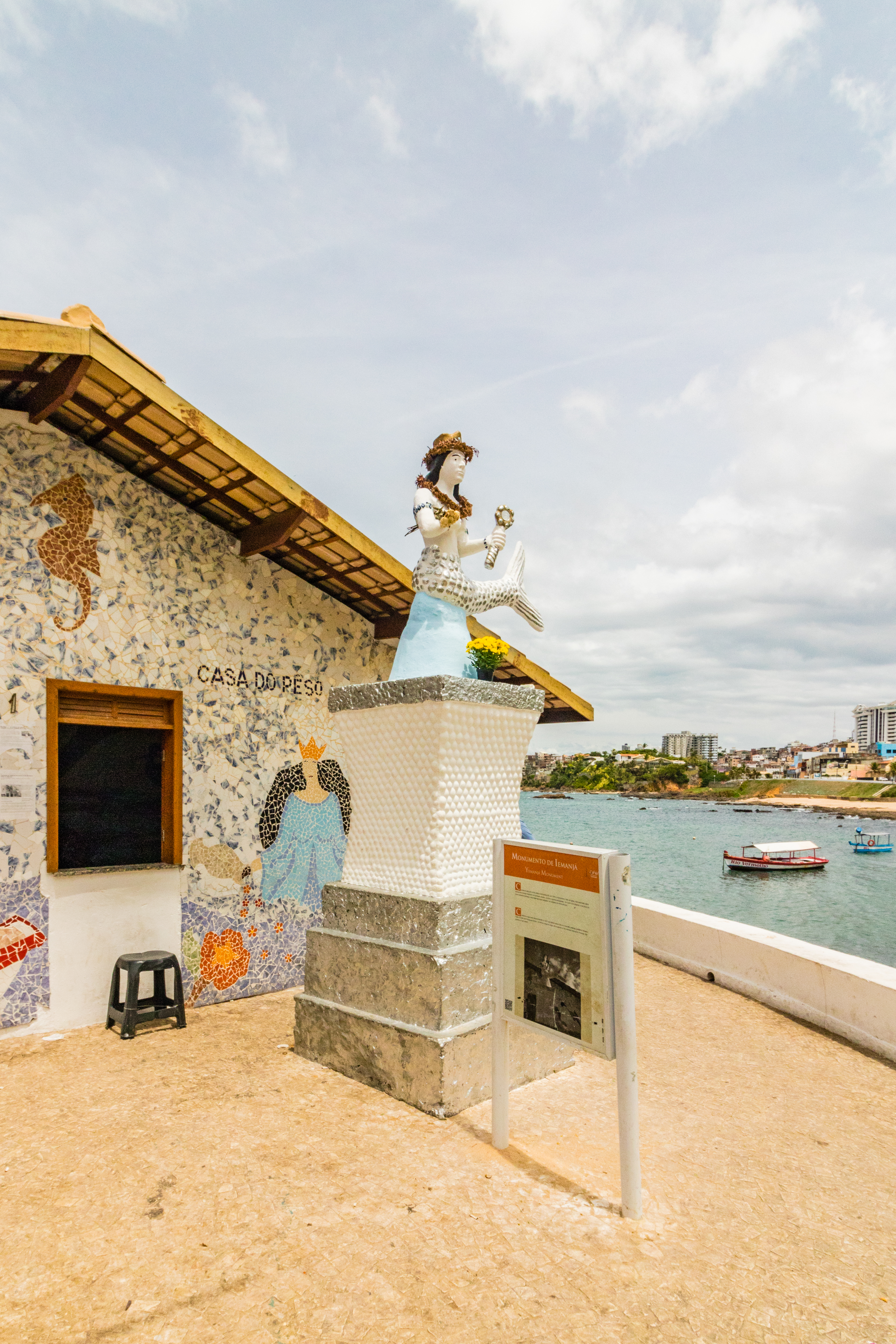
The religious house that holds the Afro-Brazilian goddess Yemanjá in Salvador.

These religious entities have been syncretised with some Catholic entities. For instance, Salvador's Feast of Bonfim, celebrated in January, is dedicated to both Our Lord of Bonfim (Jesus Christ) and Oxalá. Another important feast is the Feast de Yemanja every 2 February, on the shores of the borough of Rio Vermelho in

Salvador, on the day the church celebrates Our Lady of the Navigators. 8 December, Immaculate Conception Day for Catholics, is also commonly dedicated to Yemanja' with votive offerings made in the sea throughout the Brazilian coast.

Religion	Percentage	Number
Catholic	43.96%	947,032
Protestant	24.30%	523,449
No religion	18.48%	471,928
Other	7.80%	168,018
Umbanda and Candomblé	2.78%	59,925
Spiritist	2.40%	51,765
Unknown	0.14%	2,950
Undeclared	0.12%	2,692
Indigenous religion	0.02%	394

Source: IBGE 2022.

== Economy ==
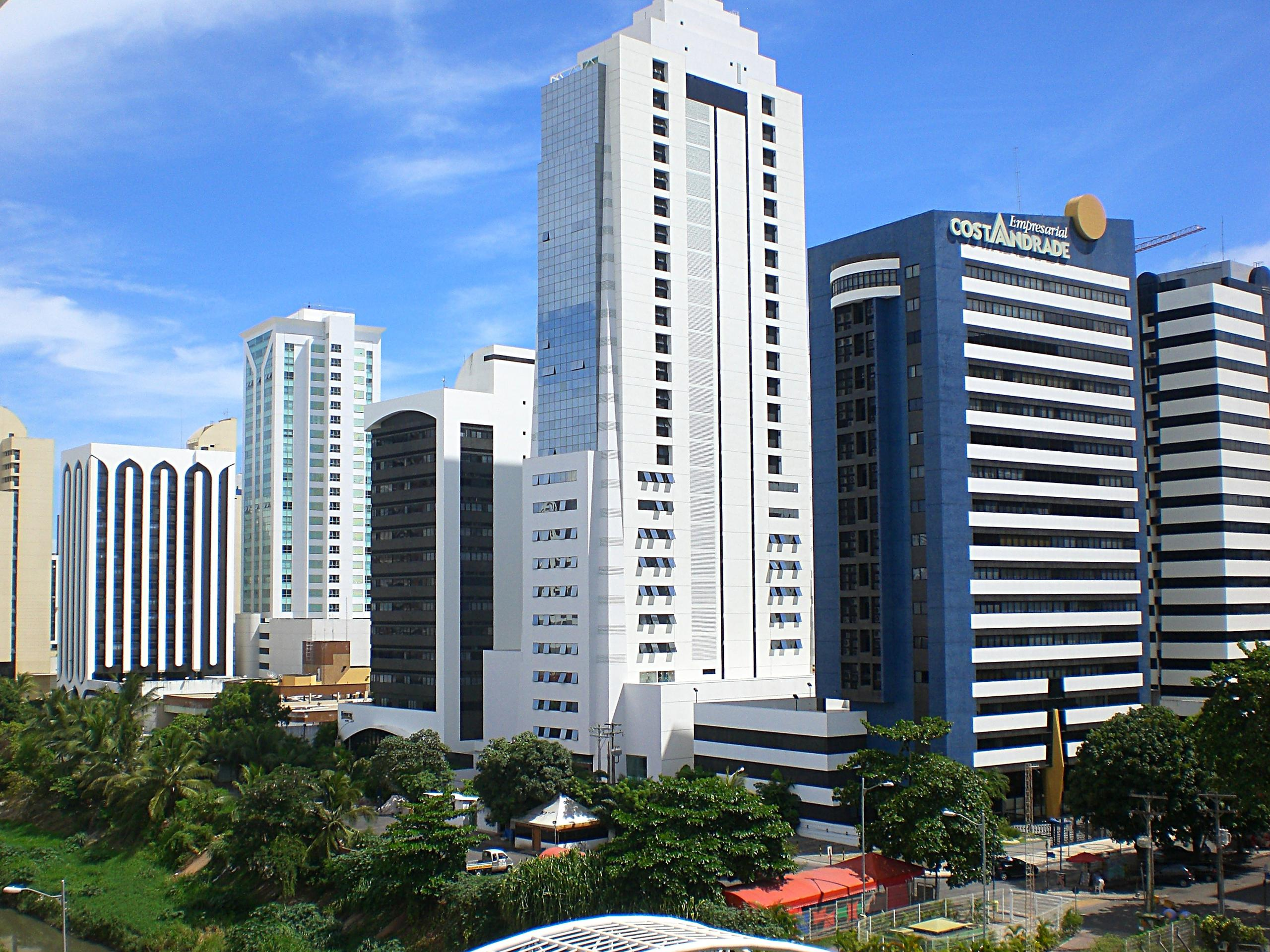
Buildings on Tancredo Neves Avenue

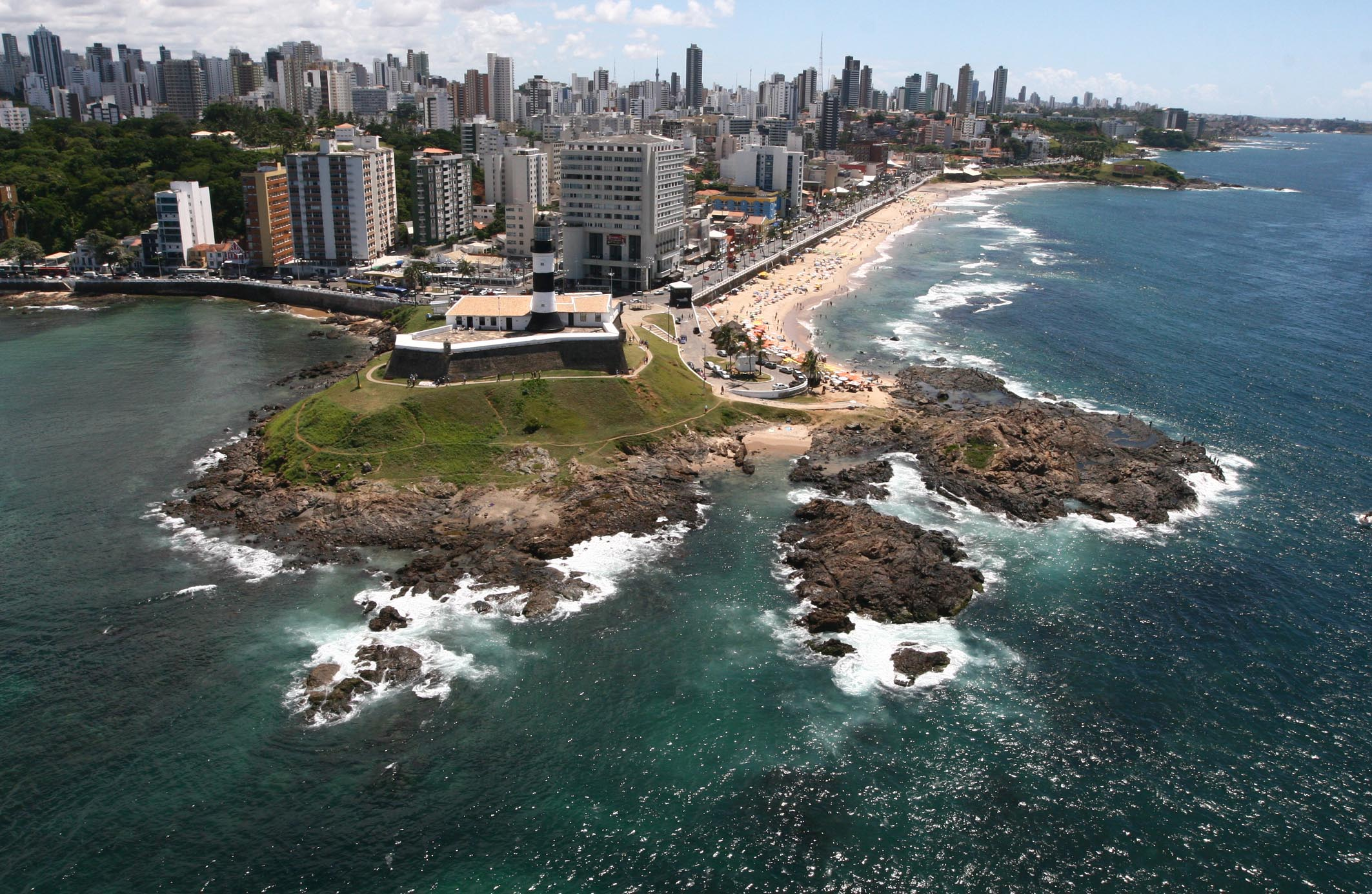
The extreme southern point of the city in the neighborhood of Barra.

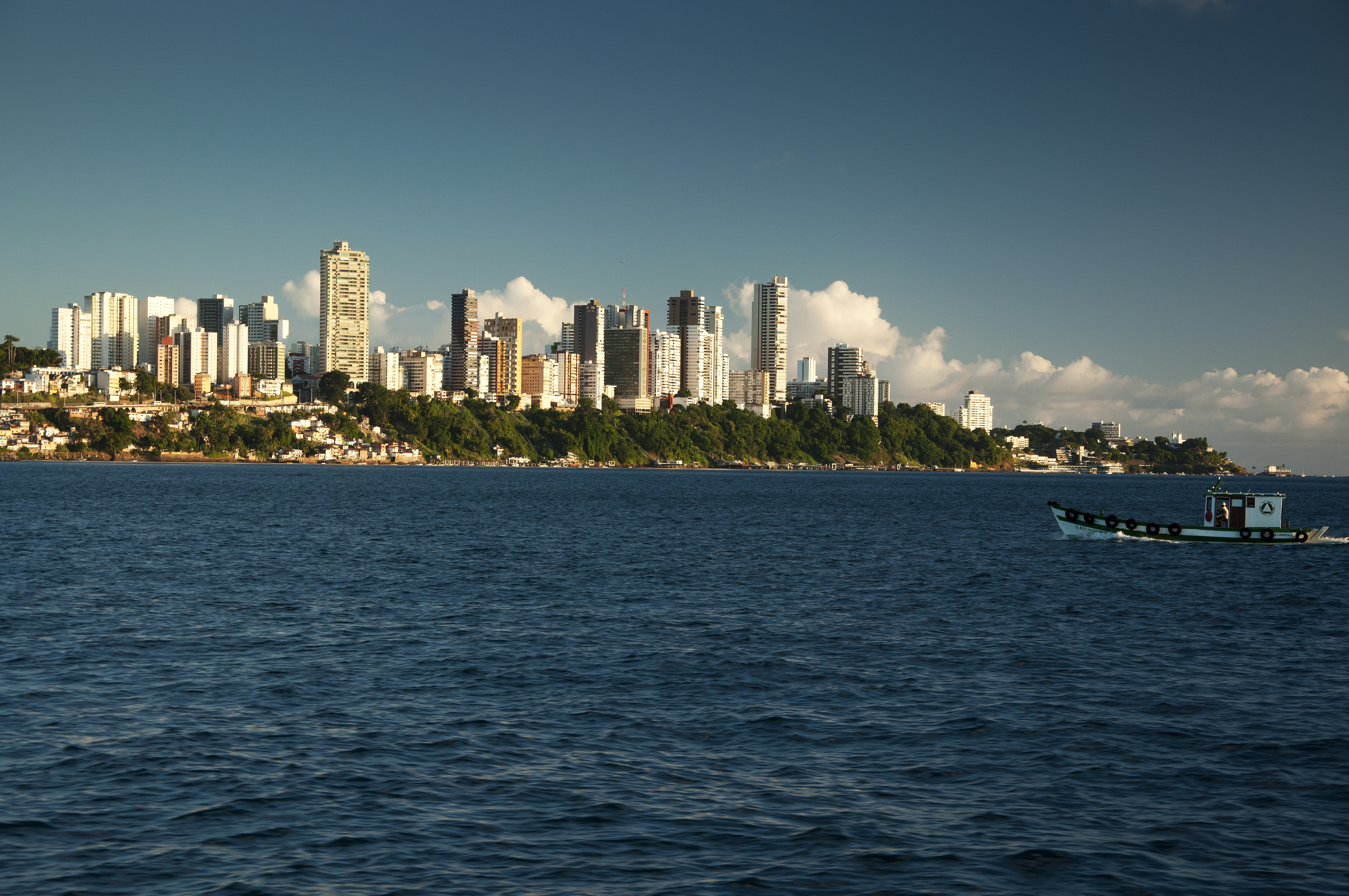
Skyscrapers in Vitória neighborhood, the most expensive address in the city

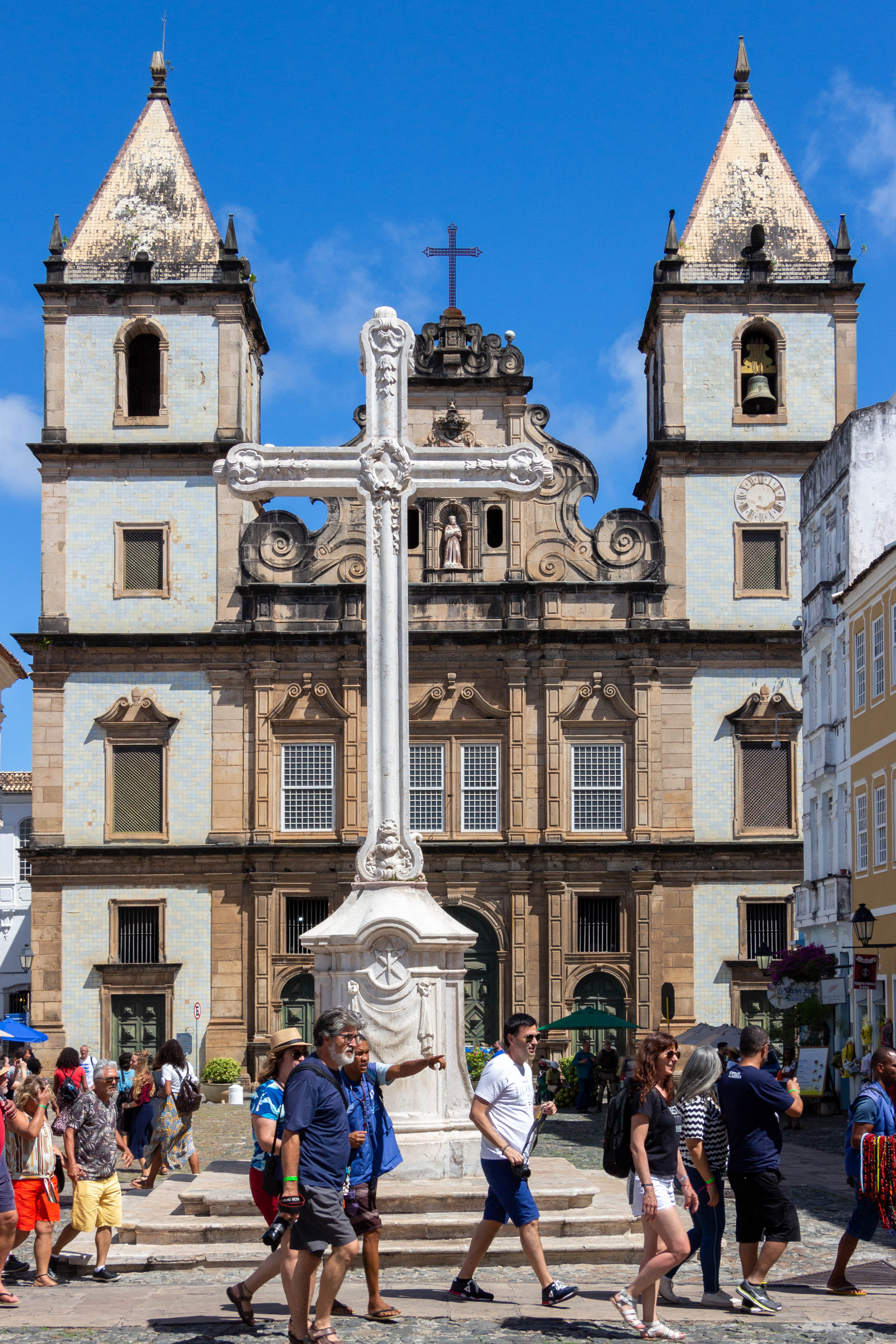
Convent and Church of São Francisco in Pelourinho

Throughout Brazilian history Salvador has played an important role. Because of its location on Brazil's northeastern coast, the city served as an important link in the Portuguese Empire throughout the colonial era, maintaining close commercial ties with Portugal and Portuguese colonies in Africa and Asia.

Salvador remained the preeminent city in Brazil until 1763 when it was replaced as the national capital by Rio de Janeiro. In the last ten years many high-rise office and apartment buildings were constructed, sharing the same blocks with colonial-era housing or commercial buildings.

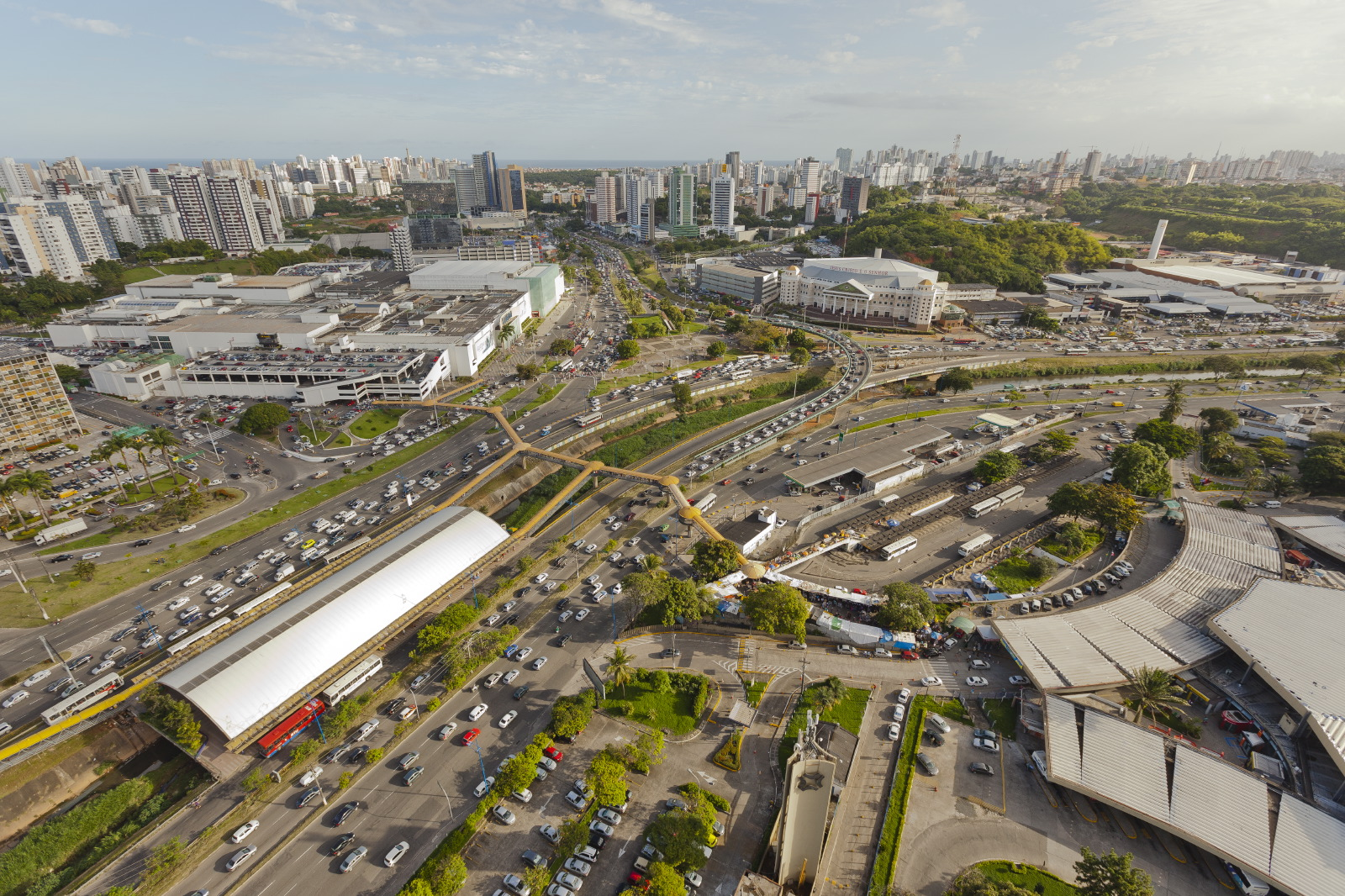
Aerial view of Iguatemi neighborhood with the Iguatemi Shopping Mall at the top left.

Salvador is the second most popular tourism destination in Brazil, after Rio de Janeiro. Tourism and cultural activity are important generators of employment and income, boosting the arts and the preservation of artistic and cultural heritage.

Chief among the points of interest are its famous Pelourinho (named after the colonial pillories that once stood there) district, its historic churches, and its beaches. Salvador's tourism infrastructure is considered one of the most modern in the World, especially in terms of lodging. The city offers accommodation to suit all tastes and standards, from youth hostels to international hotels. Construction is one of the most important activities in the city, and many international (mainly from Spain, Portugal and England) and national developers are investing in the city and in the Bahian littoral zone.

JAC Motors will have a plant in the Metropolitan Region of Salvador, in the city of Camaçari, the new industry will result 3,500 direct jobs and 10,000 indirect jobs, the production of 100,000 vehicles by year.

In December 2001, Monsanto Company inaugurated, at the Petrochemical Pole of Camaçari, in Metropolitan Region of Salvador, the first plant of the company designed to produce raw materials for the herbicide Roundup in South America. The investment is equivalent to US$500 million; US$350 million were spent in this initial phase. The Camaçari Plant, the largest unit of Monsanto outside of the United States, is also the only Monsanto plant manufacturing raw materials for the Roundup production line. The company started the civil works for the new plant in January 2000.

Economy	GDP (in reais)	GDP per capita (in reais)
2016	58 billion	19.505,84

== Government and politics ==
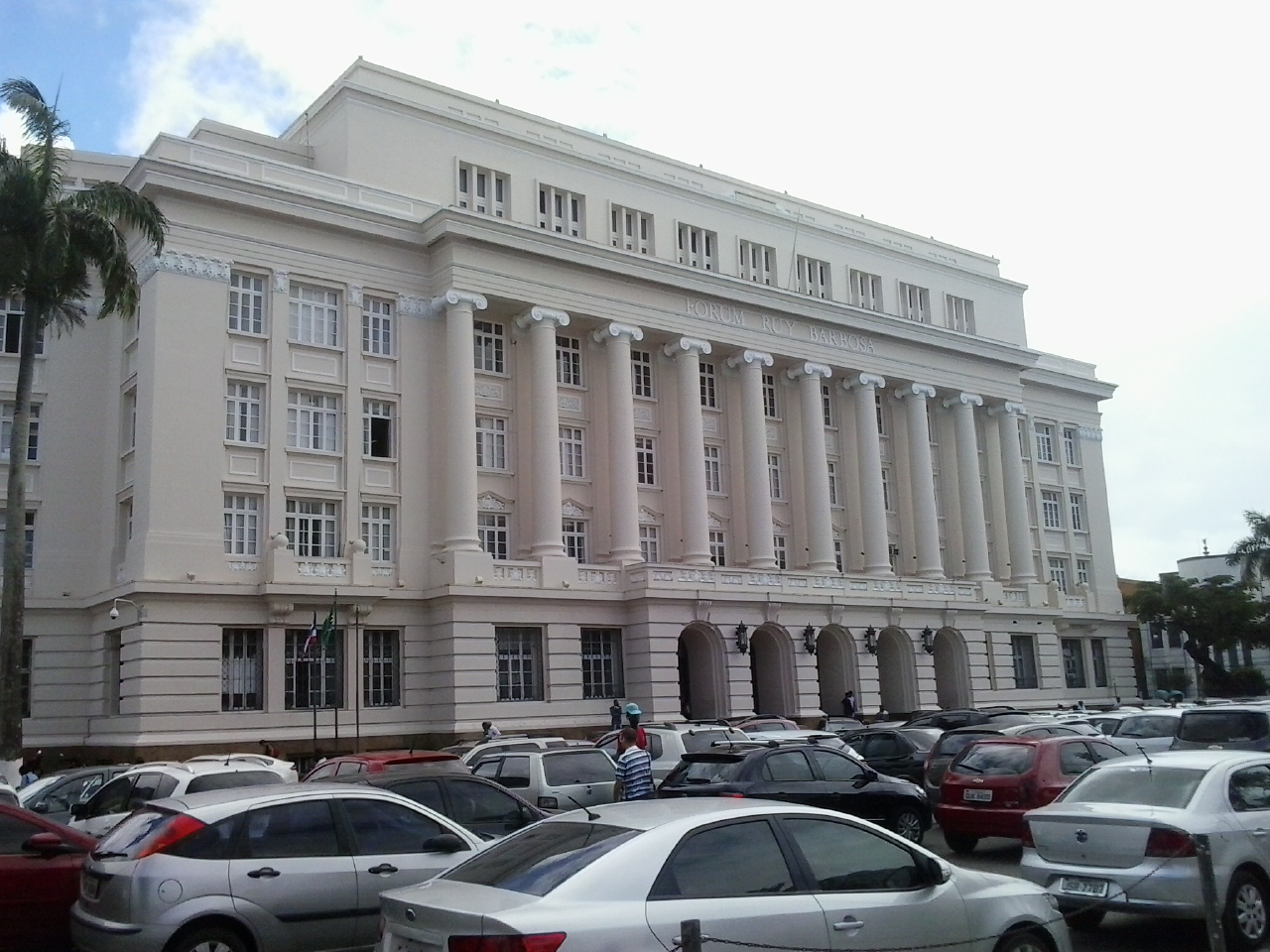
Ruy Barbosa Forum

Salvador's history as the first political capital of Brazil and as the capital of Bahia has meant that the city has historically exerted significant influence of both state and federal politics. Because of its importance as the largest port for imported slaves in Brazil, its early political history was dominated by a conservative slaveholding class. Bahia was a monarchy stronghold during the movement for Brazilian independence and was the last to join the new Empire of Brazil. Despite the abolition of slavery, expansion of the franchise and steady migration of Afro-Brazilians from the Bahian countryside into the city, the city's elected offices have and continue to be dominated by a mostly European-descended upper class in a majority Black city. Afro-Brazilians continue to be underrepresented politically and urban renewal efforts have increasingly displaced them out of the historical city center towards the suburbs. Examples of the city's political elite include the Magalhães family, which in the last 50 years has held positions for mayor of Salvador (Antônio Carlos and his grandson ACM Neto), governor of Bahia (Antônio Carlos), senator (Antônio Carlos and his son Antônio Júnior) and federal deputy (uncle Luís Eduardo and nephew ACM Neto). The control of the state of Bahia, and by extension Salvador, under political boss Antônio Carlos Magalhães was marked by an authoritarian style of clientelism known locally as carlismo.

Since January 2021, the mayor of Salvador has been Bruno Soares Reis of the União Brasil party (DEM). The office of mayor has a 4-year term and works with a deputy mayor, also an elected 4 year position. The current deputy mayor is Ana Paula Matos (PDT). In recent decades, the position has been held by mostly members of center-right parties such as the Brazilian Democratic Movement Party (PMDB), Brazilian Social Democracy Party (PSDB) and more recently the Democrats (DEM).

There are 43 councilors in the Salvador City Council, most recently elected in 2020. Geraldo Júnior (MDB) had been the president of the City Council.

== Tourism and recreation ==
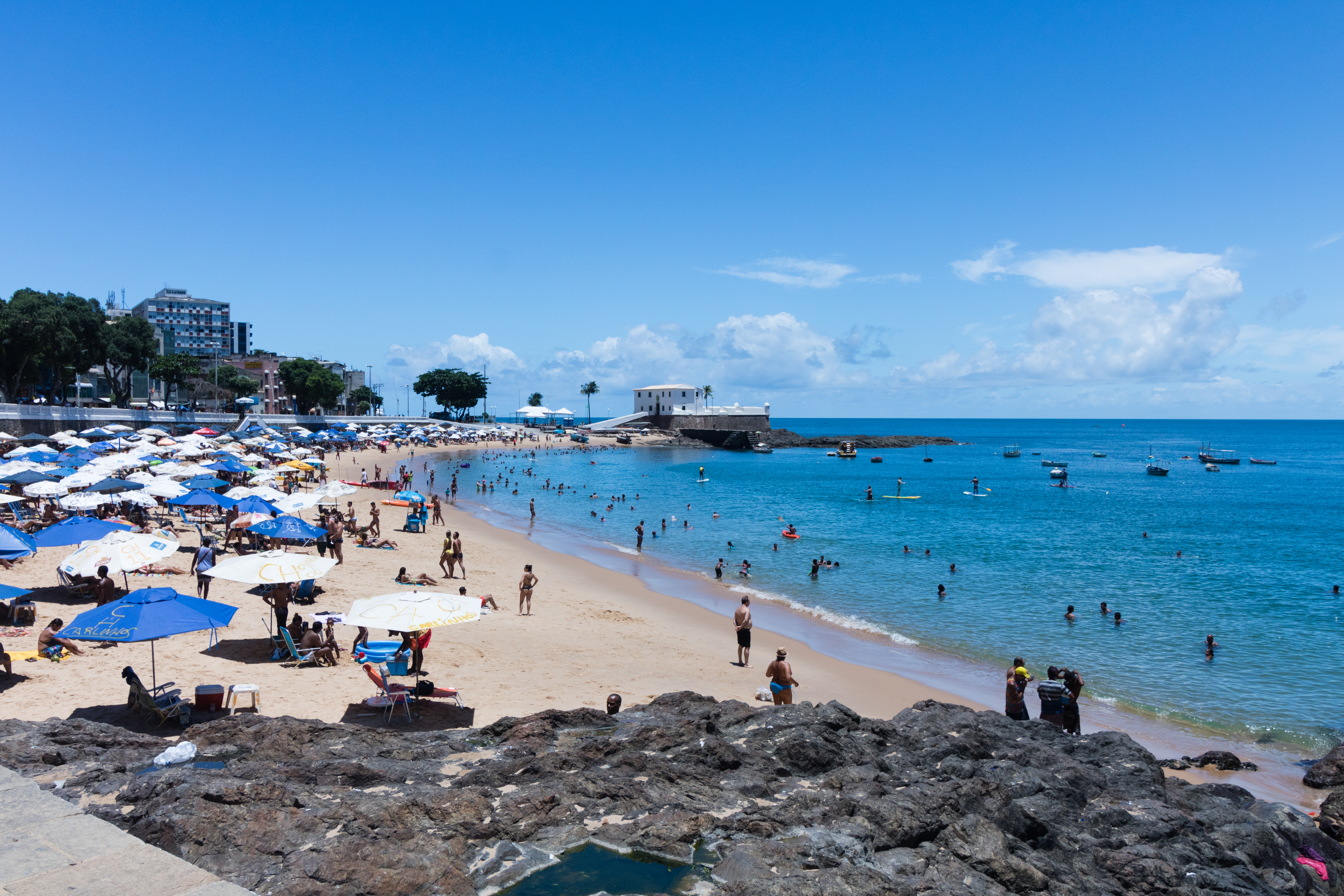
Porto da Barra Beach in Barra

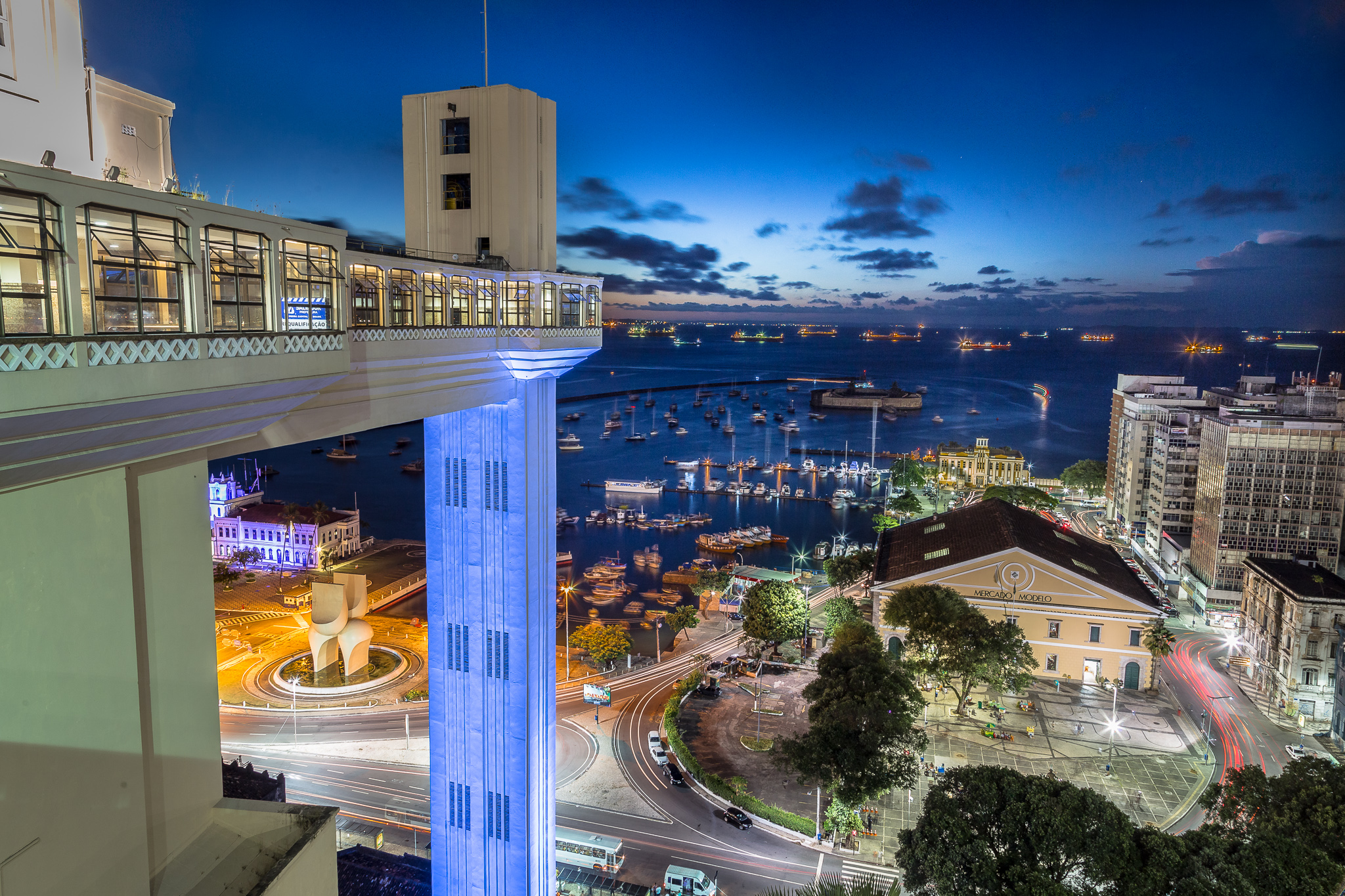
Salvador, capital of Bahia state, is the centre of Afro-Brazilian culture.

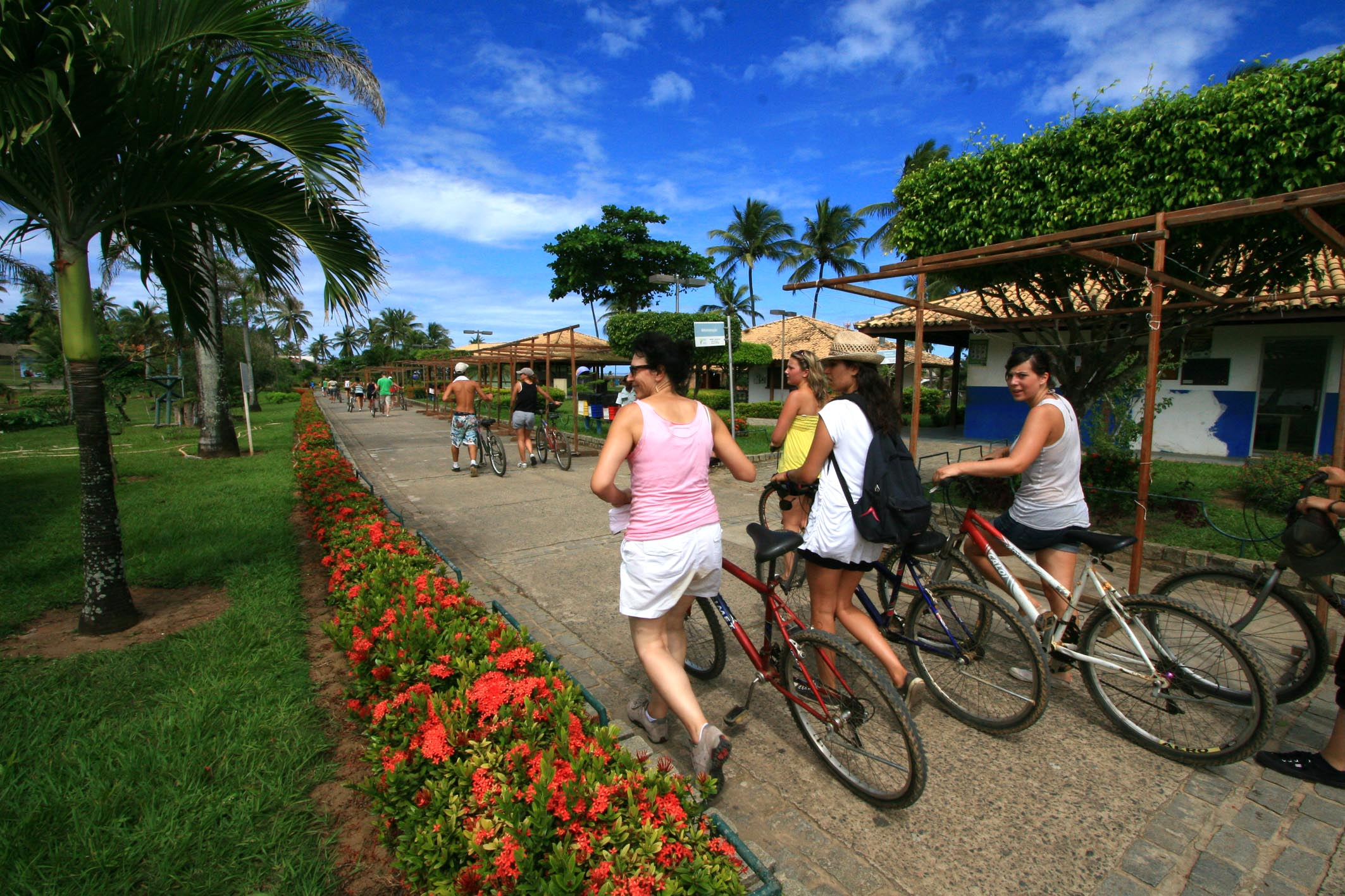
Cyclists in Pituaçu Park

The Salvador coastline is one of the longest for cities in Brazil. There are 80 km (50 mi) of beaches distributed between the High City and the Low City, from Inema, in the railroad suburb to the Praia do Flamengo, on the other side of town. While the Low City beaches are bordered by the waters of the All Saints Bay (the country's most extensive bay), the High City beaches, from Farol da Barra to Flamengo, are bordered by the Atlantic Ocean. The exception is Porto da Barra Beach, the only High City beach located in the All Saints Bay.

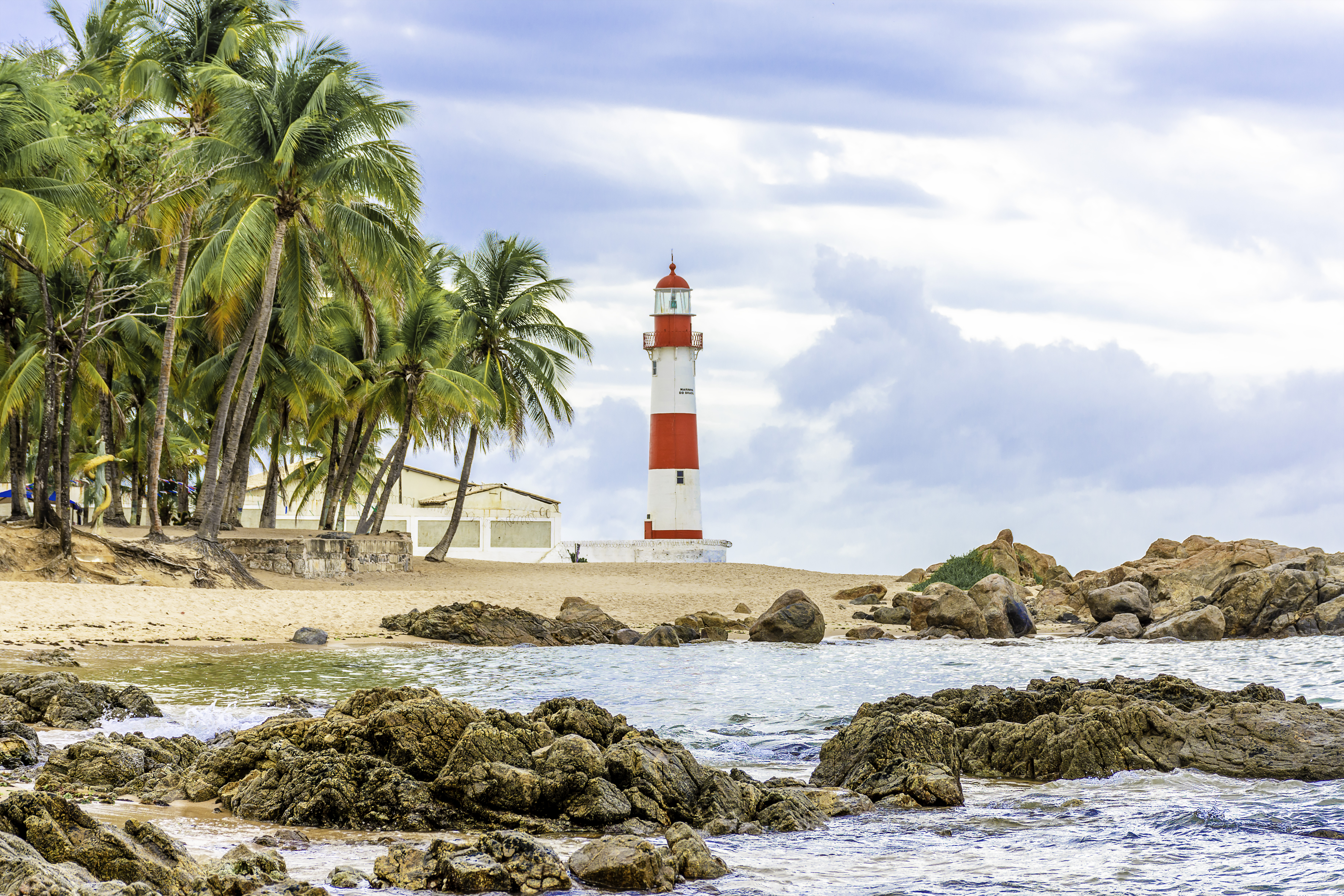
Beach & Lighthouse by Itapuã

The capital's beaches range from calm inlets, ideal for swimming, sailing, diving and underwater fishing, as well as open sea inlets with strong waves, sought by surfers. There are also beaches surrounded by reefs, forming natural pools of stone, ideal for children.

Interesting places to visit near Salvador include:

- According to the British newspaper The Guardian, in 2007, Porto da Barra Beach was the third best in the world.
- The large island of Itaparica in the Bay of All Saints can be visited either by a car-ferry, or a smaller foot-passenger ferry, which leaves from near the Mercado Modelo near the Lacerda Elevator.
- BA-099 Highway, or "Line of Coconut" and "Green Line" of towns and cities, with exquisite beaches, north of Salvador heading towards Sergipe state.
- Morro de São Paulo in the Valença region across the Bay of All Saints – an island that can be reached by ferry from Salvador (2 hours), by plane, or by bus to Valença and then by 'Rapido' ('fast') speedboat or smaller ferry. Morro de São Paulo is formed by five villages of the Tinharé Island.

The city is served by many shopping malls, including Shopping da Bahia (formerly Shopping Iguatemi), Salvador Shopping, Shopping Barra, and Shopping Paralela.

Salvador has several museums, including the Museum of Modern Art of Bahia (MAM), which is located in the historic Solar do Unhão complex near the Bay of All Saints. The complex was restored by Italian-Brazilian architect Lina Bo Bardi, who also served as the museum's first director. The museum displays modern and contemporary art and organizes exhibitions and educational activities. It has also hosted "Jam no MAM", a series of jazz and instrumental music performances.

Other notable museums in the city include the Afro-Brazilian Museum, which explores African influence in Brazilian culture, and the Carlos Costa Pinto Museum, which offers a glimpse into the aristocratic lifestyle of colonial Bahia. Together, these museums provide visitors with a deeper understanding of Salvador's unique identity.

Salvador has four parks, green areas protected, as Jardim dos Namorados Park, Costa Azul Park, Park of the city, Park of Pituaçu.

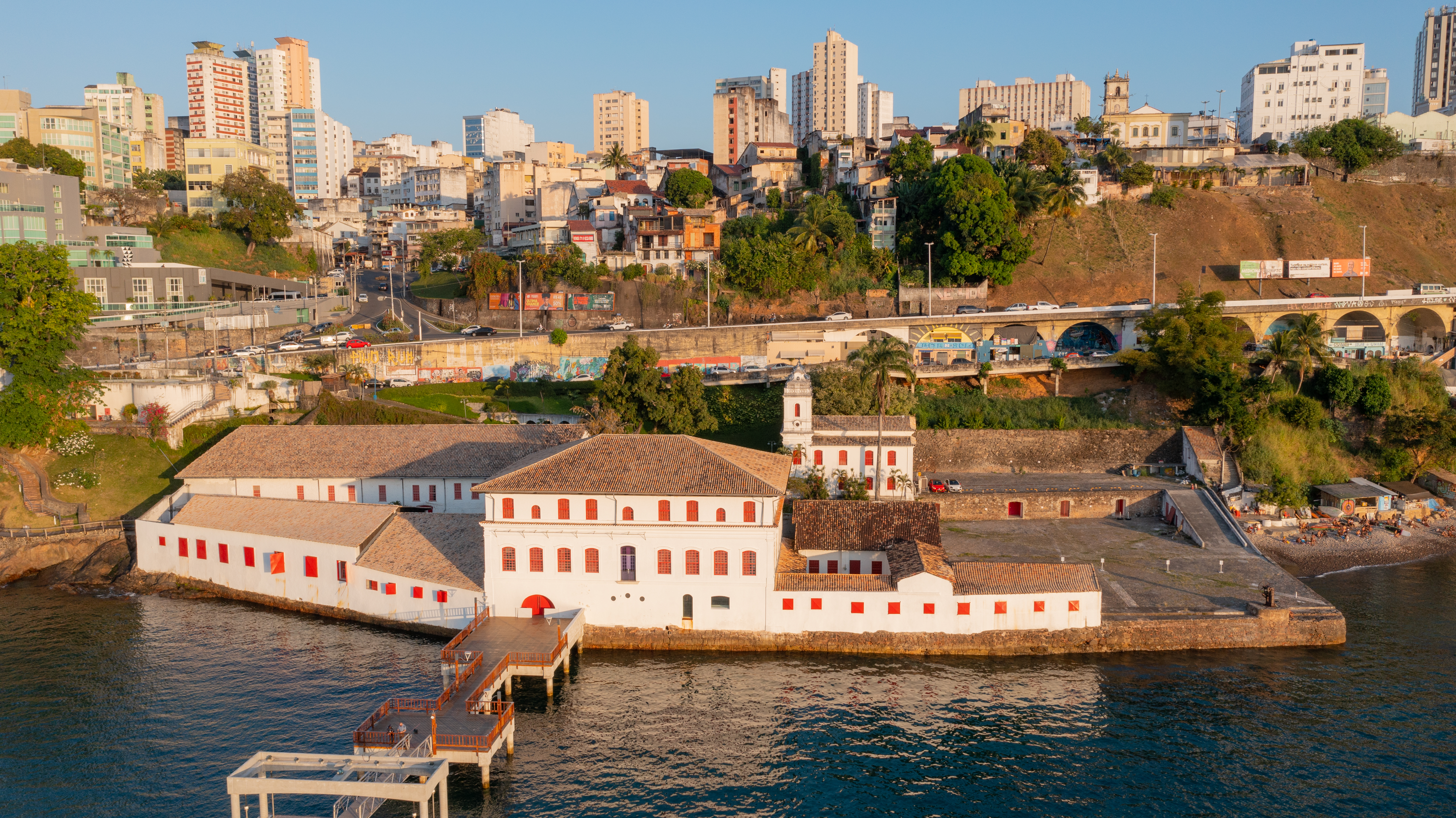
Museo de Arte Moderno de Bahía - Solar do Unhão

Jardim dos Namorados is located right next to Costa Azul Park and occupies an area of 15 hectares in Pituba, where many families used to spend their vacations in the 1950s. It was inaugurated in 1969, initially as a leisure area. It underwent a complete renovation in the 1990s, with the construction of an amphitheater with room for 500 people, sports courts, playgrounds and parking for cars and tourist buses.

Park of the city is an important preservation area of the Atlantic forest. It was completely renovated in 2001, becoming a modern social, cultural and leisure place. The new park has 720 m^{2} of green area right in the middle of the city. Among the attractions are Praça das Flores (Flowers square), with more than five thousand ornamental plants and flowers.

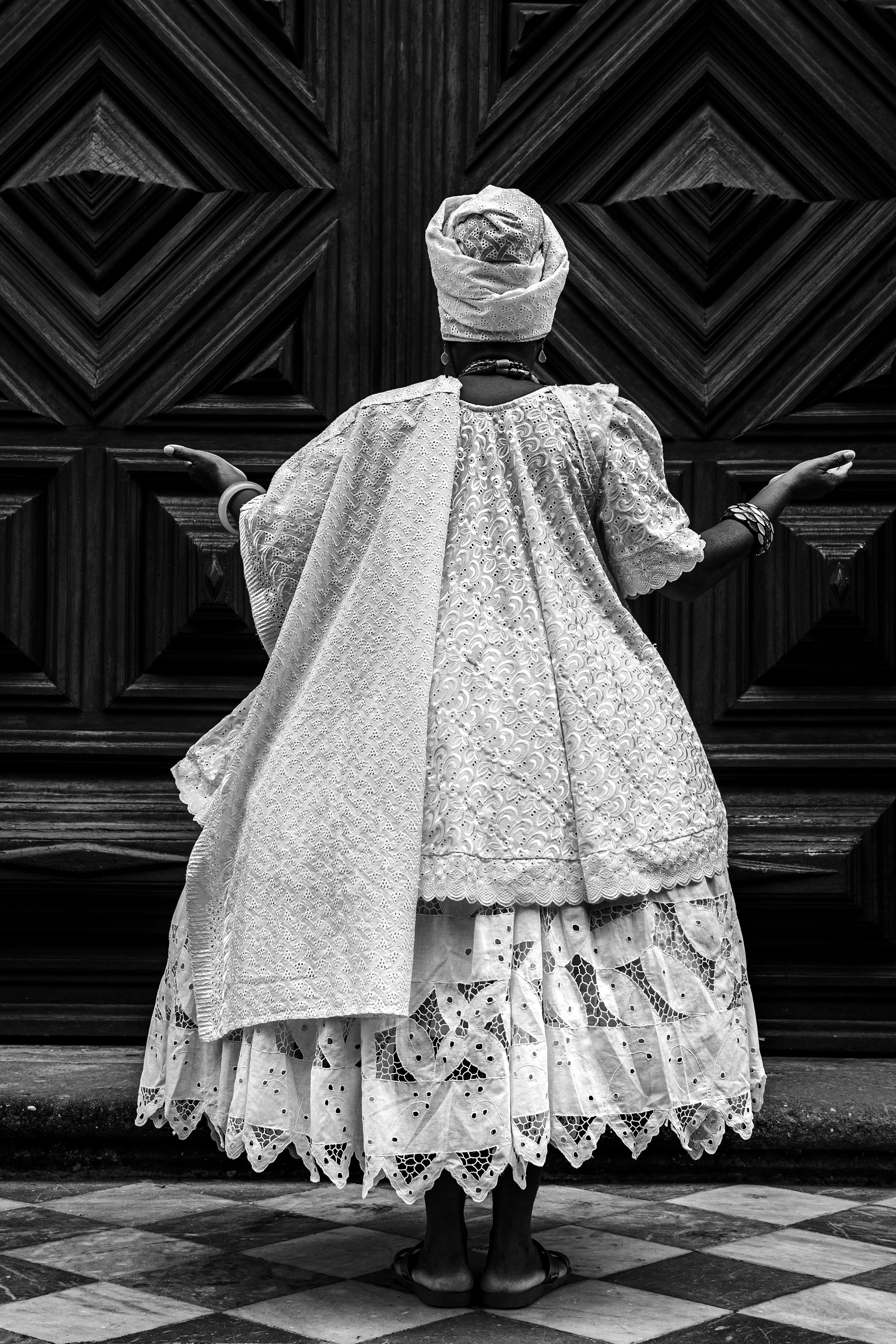
Baiana

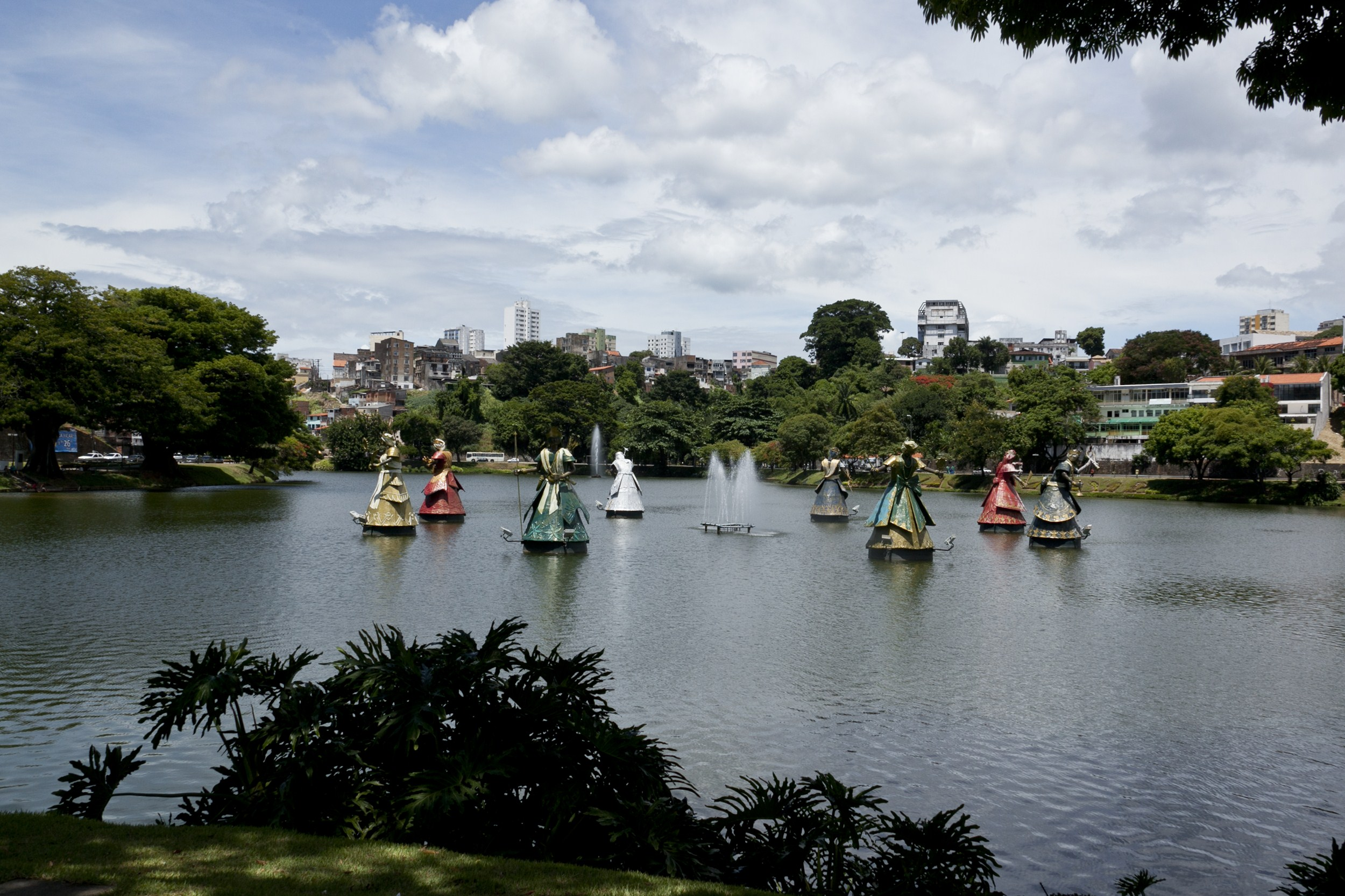
The sculptures of orishas by Dique do Tororó

Besides its environment, the park has an infrastructure for children, with a special schedule of events taking place every October.

Created by state decree in 1973, Pituaçu Park occupies an area of 450 hectares and is one of the few Brazilian ecological parks located in an urban area. It is surrounded by Atlantic forest, with a good variety of plants and animals. There is also an artificial pond in the park, built in 1906 along with the Pituaçu Dam, whose purpose was to supply water to the city.

There are a number of possible leisure activities, ranging from cycloboats rides on the pond, to a 38 km (24 mi) long cycloway circling the entire reserve. A museum is also located in the park. Espaço Cravo is an outdoor museum with 800 pieces created by Mario Cravo, consisting of totems, winged and three-dimensional figures, as well as drawings and paintings.

Colonial architecture in Salvador

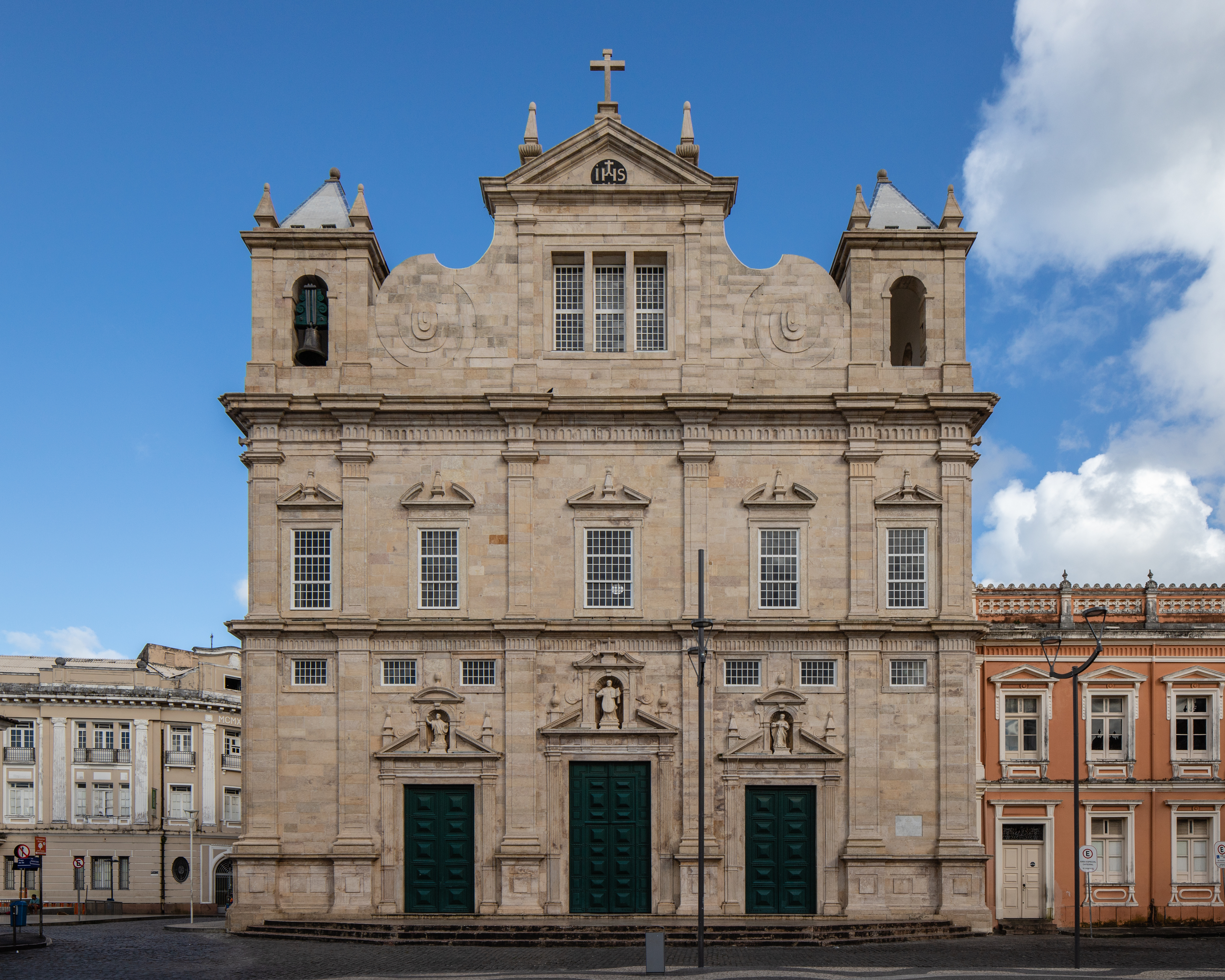
Cathedral Basilica of Salvador, built between 1657 and 1679.

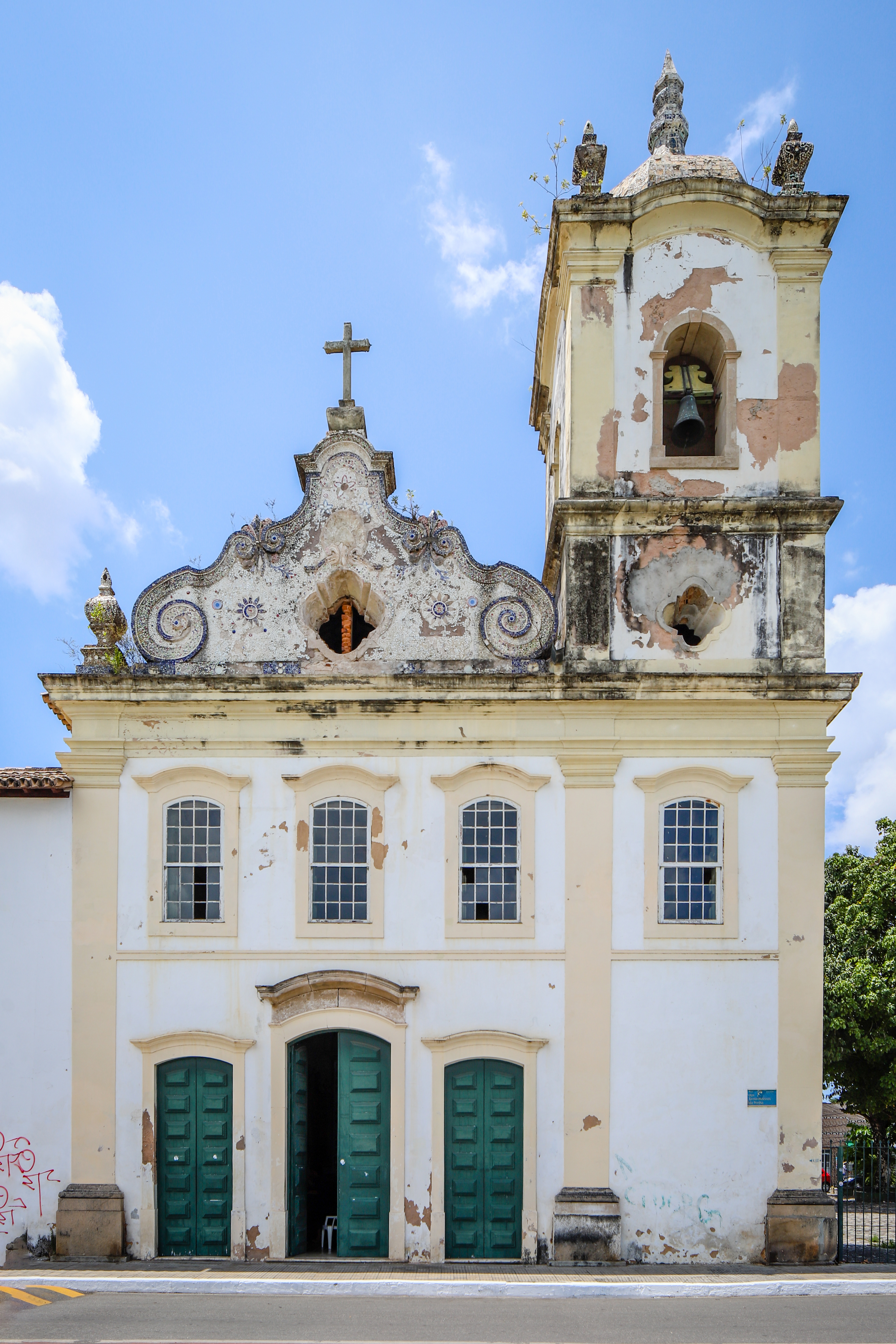
Church of Nossa Senhora da Penha, Salvador, built between 1723 and 1784.

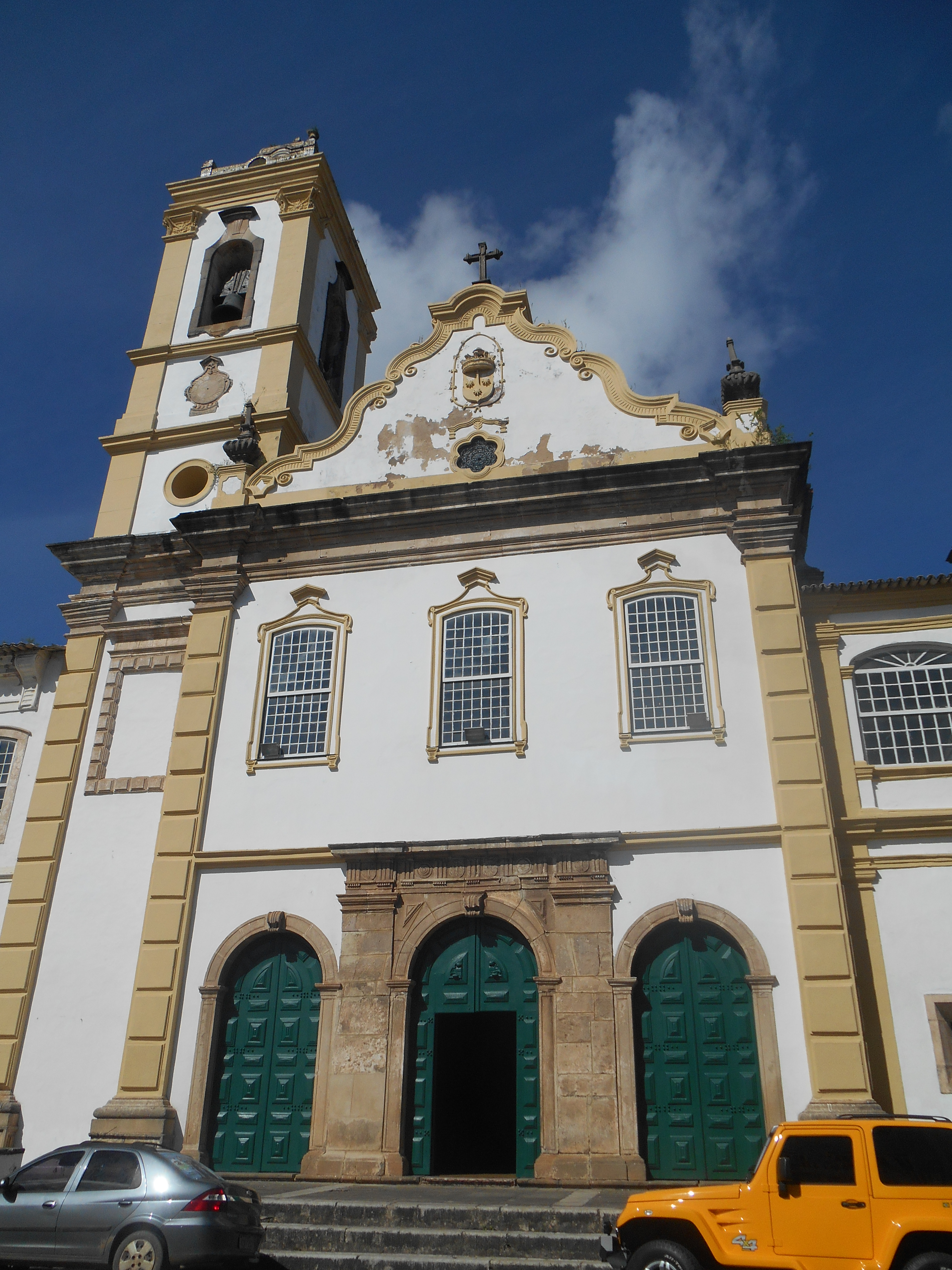
Church and Convent of Nossa Senhora do Carmo, built in 1681.

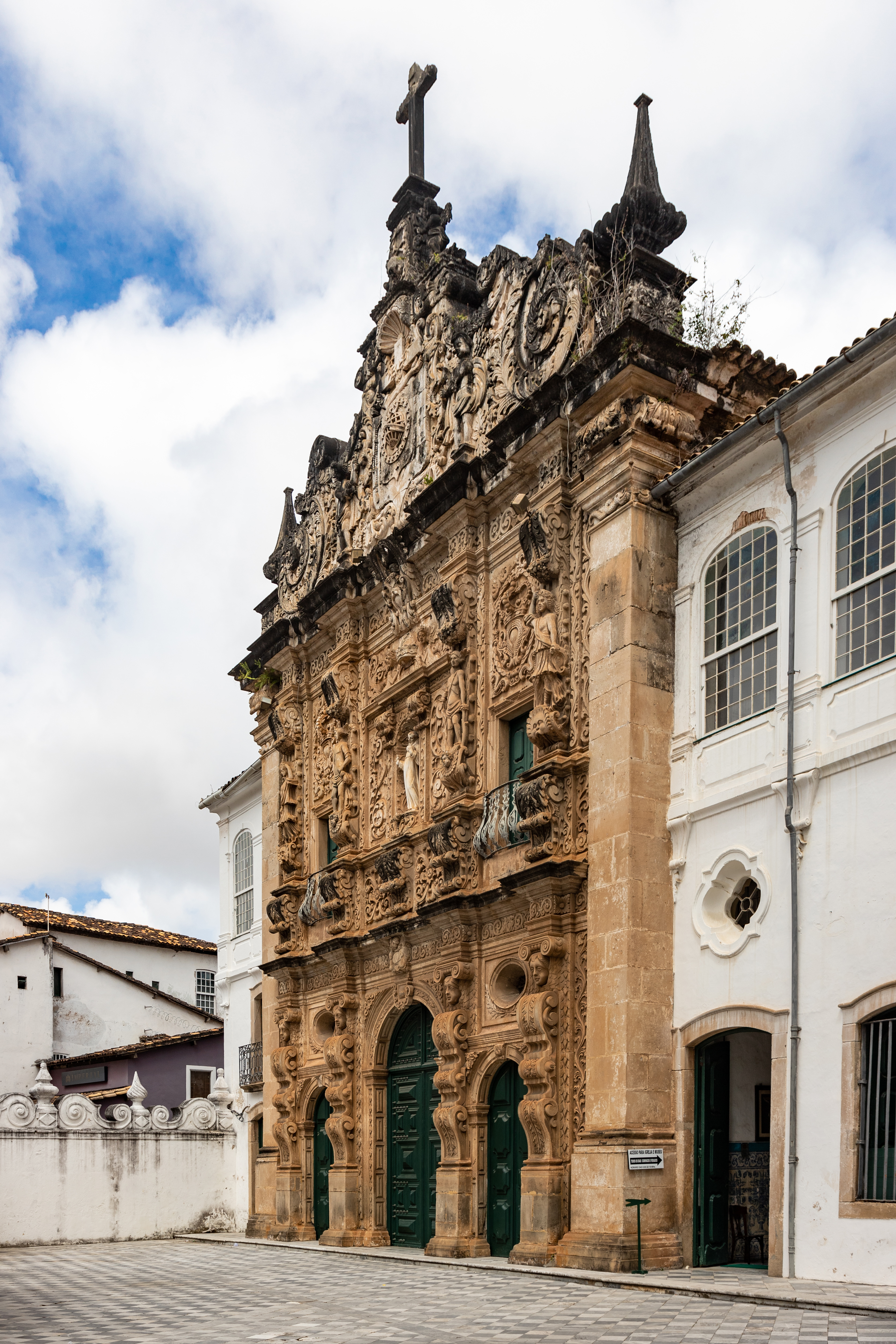
Church da Ordem Terceira de São Francisco (Salvador), built between 1702 and 1705.

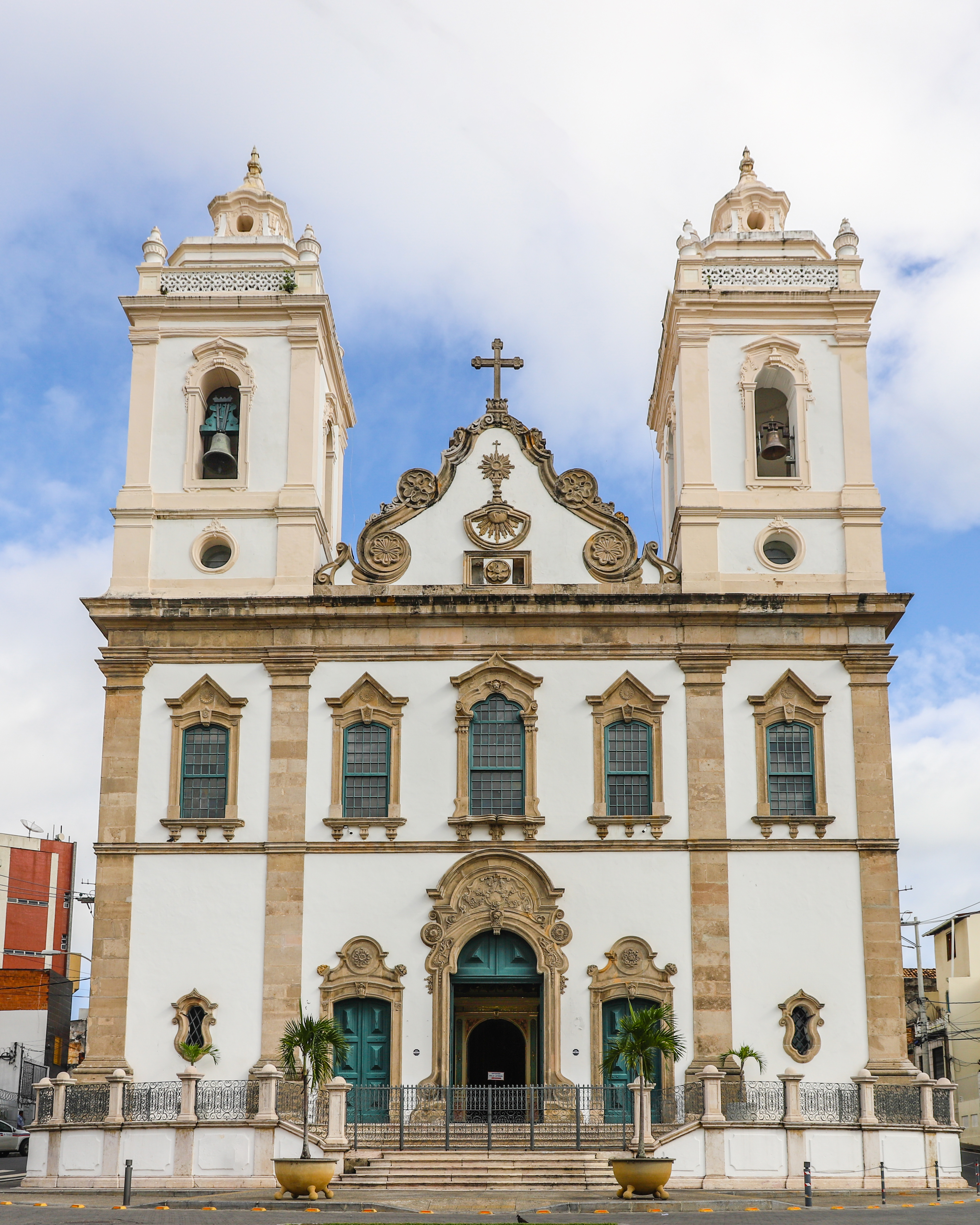
Church do Santíssimo Sacramento e Sant'Ana, built between 1696 and 1702.

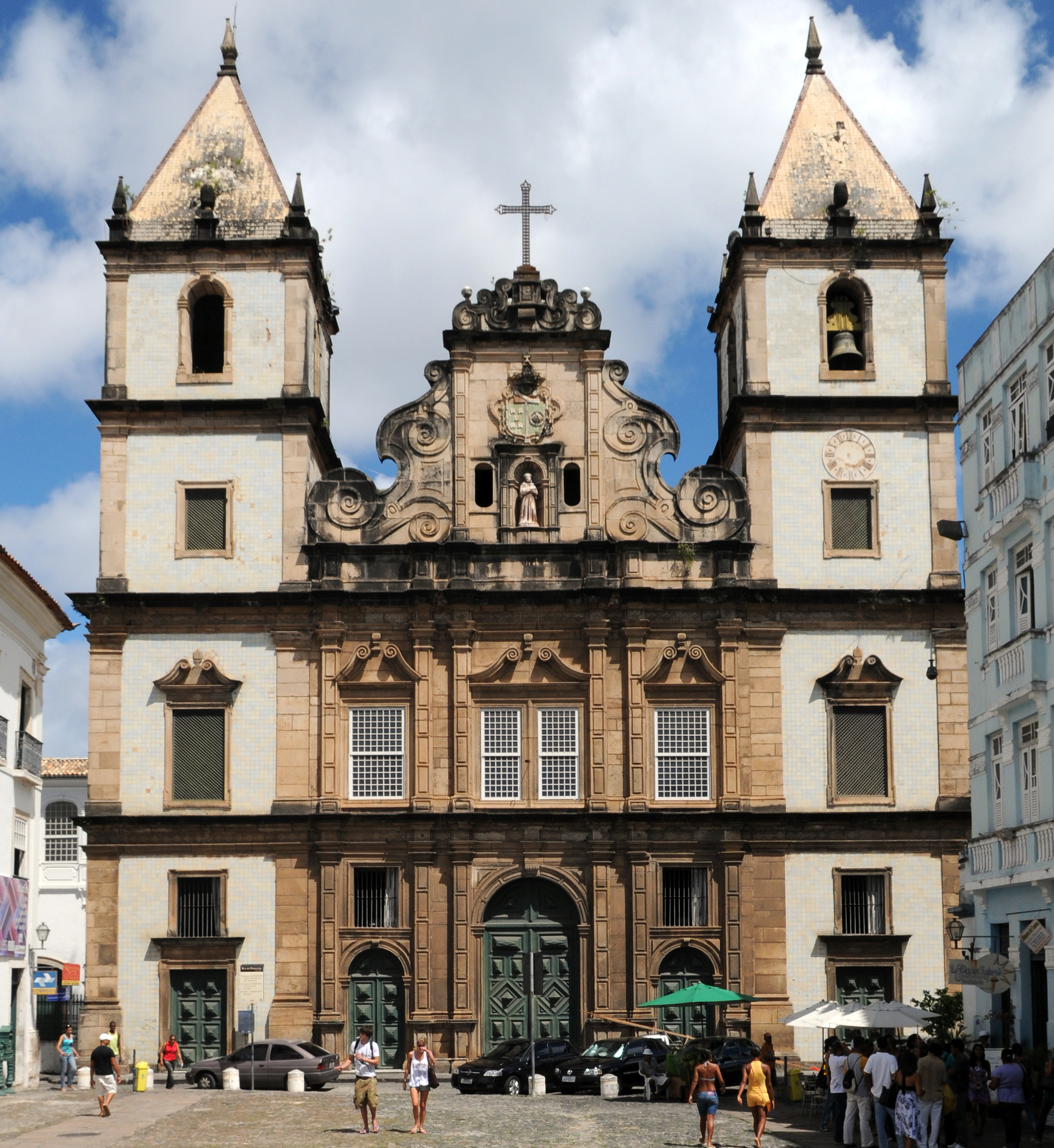
Church and Convent of São Francisco, Salvador, built between 1686 and 1752.

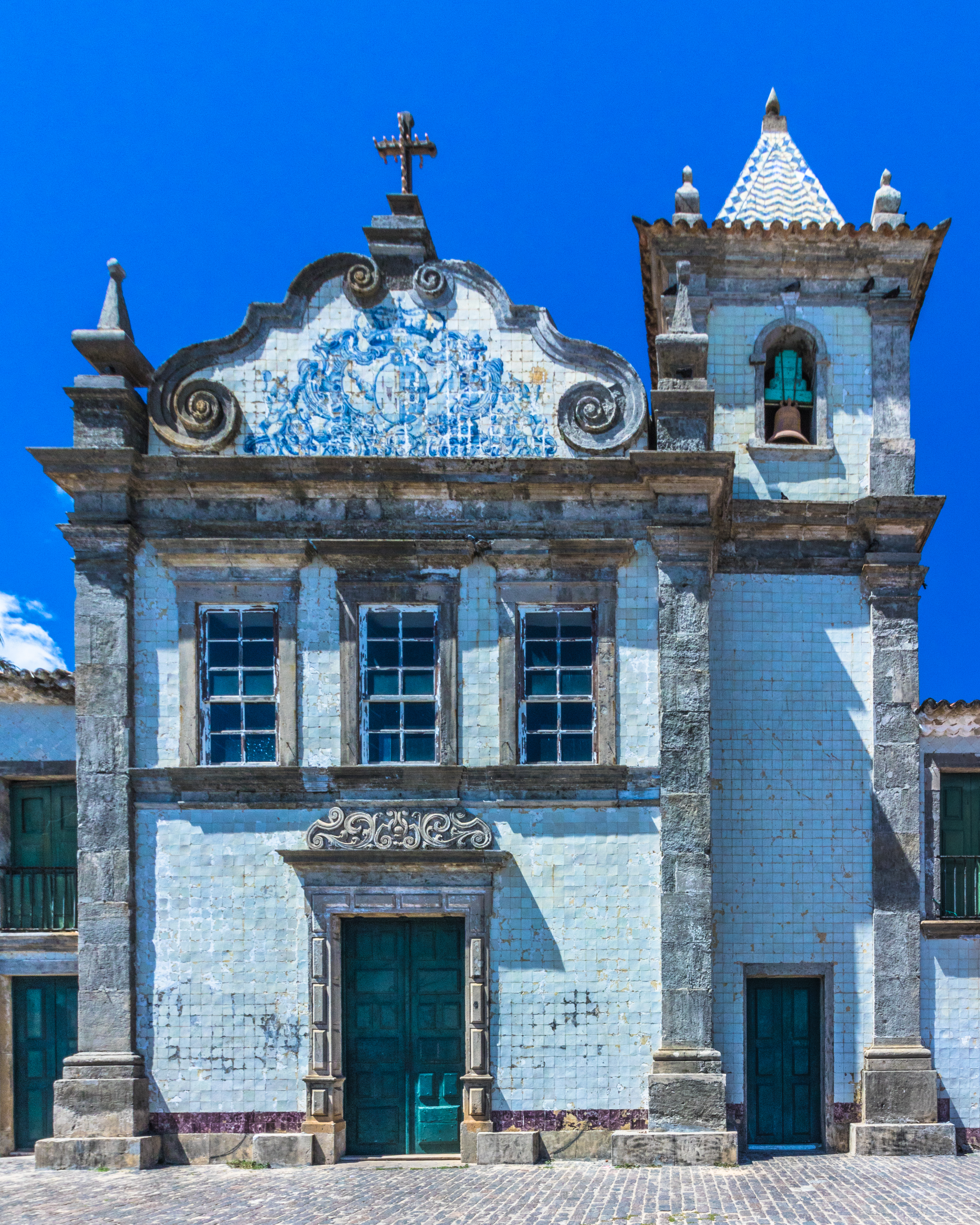
Church and Hospice of Nossa Senhora da Boa Viagem, built in 18th century.

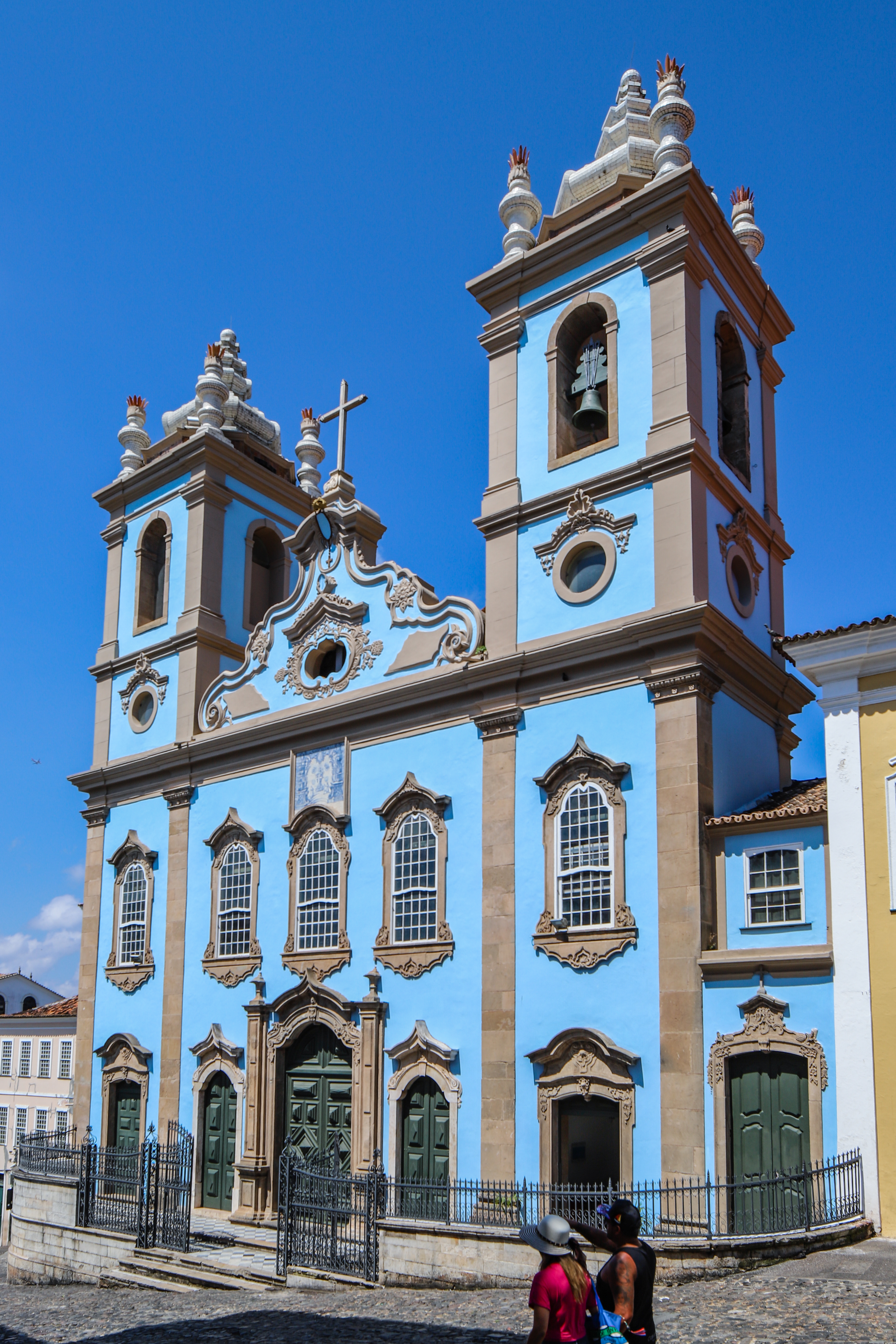
Church of Nossa Senhora do Rosário dos Pretos, built in the 18th century, with current decoration executed between the 1870s and 1890s.

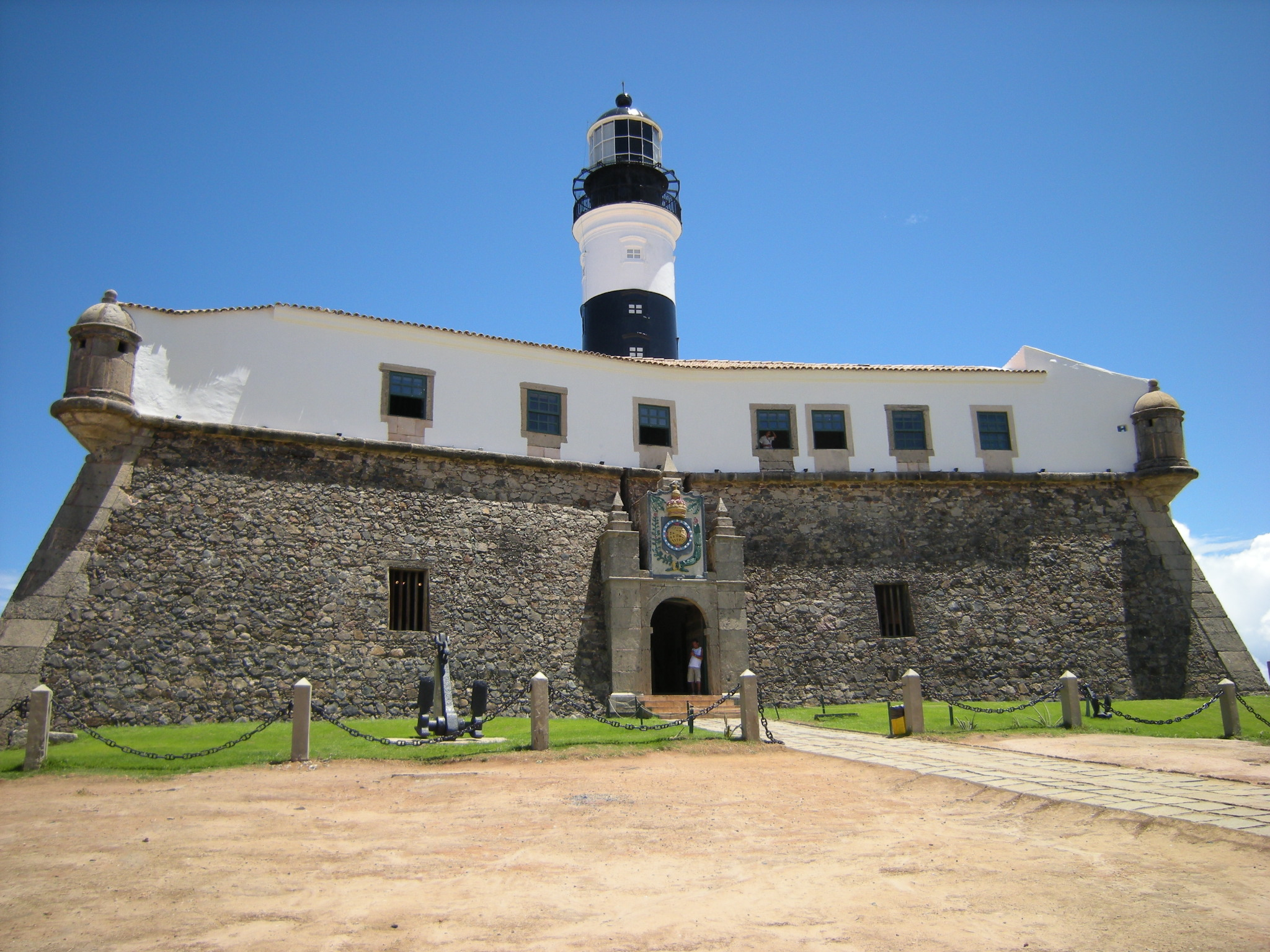
Fort of Santo Antônio da Barra, built between 1696 and 1702.

== Education ==
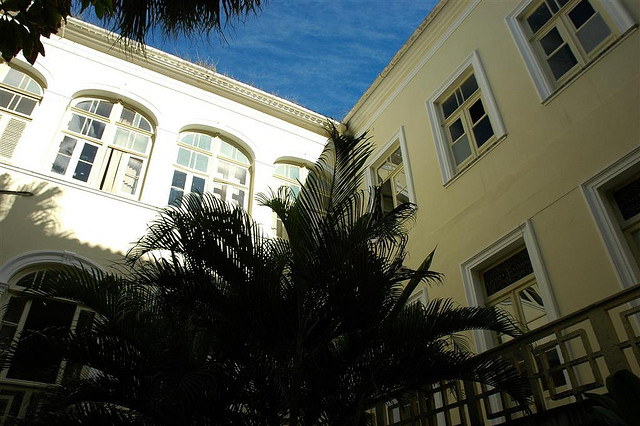
Archeology and Ethnology Museum of UFBA

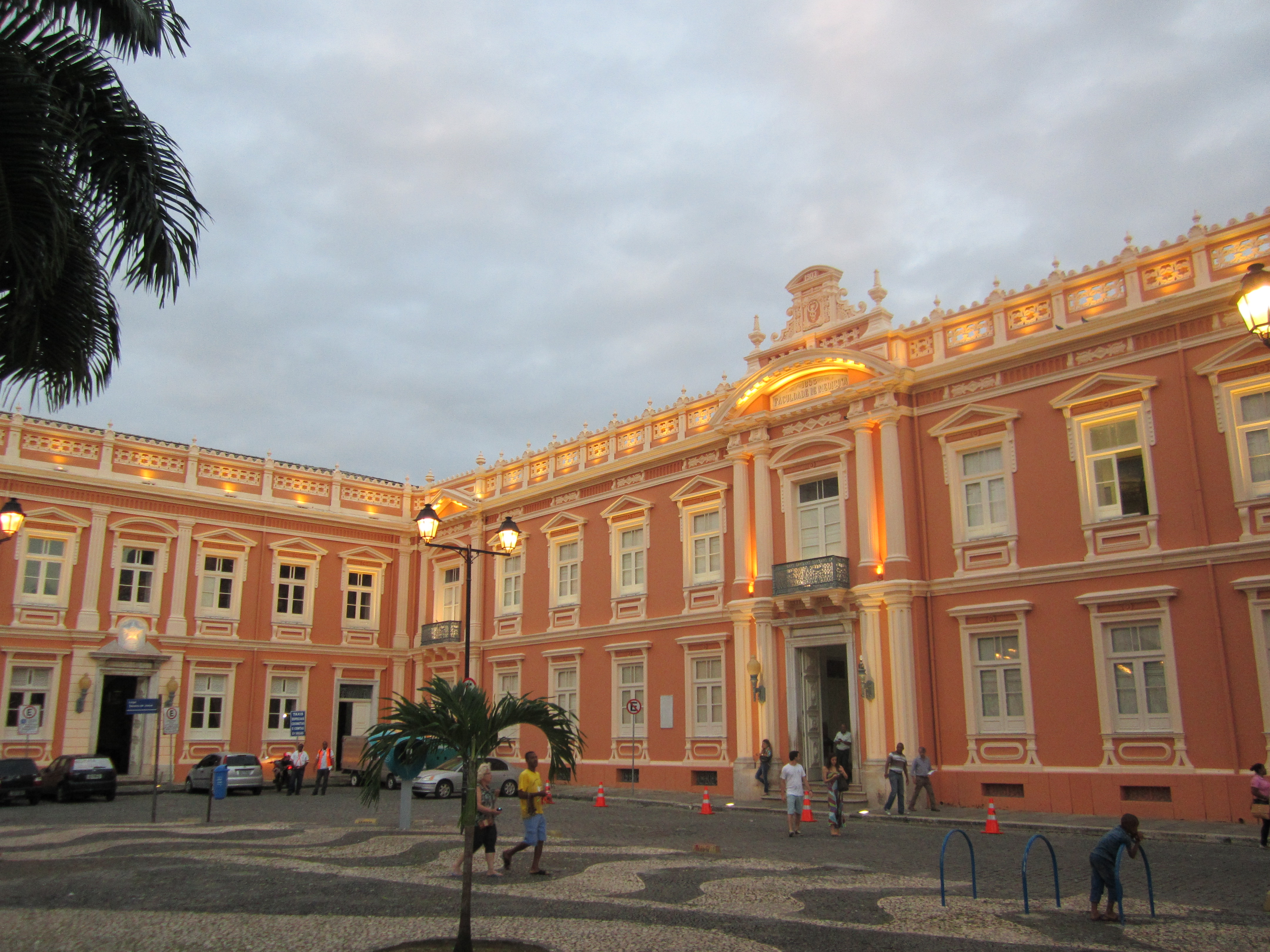
The old Faculdade de Medicina da Bahia (FMB), the first medical school in the country, located in Pelourinho. In recent times, it serves as a museum.

=== Educational institutions ===
The city has several universities:

- Universidade Federal da Bahia (UFBA) (Federal University of Bahia);
- Universidade Católica do Salvador (UCSal) (Catholic University of Salvador);
- Universidade do Estado da Bahia (UNEB) (Bahia State University);
- Universidade Salvador (UNIFACS) (Salvador University);
- Faculdade de Tecnologia e Ciências (FTC) (College of Technology and Science);
- Instituto Federal da Bahia (IFBA) (Federal Institute of Bahia);
- Faculdade Ruy Barbosa (FRB) (Ruy Barbosa College);
- Campus Integrado de Manufatura e Tecnologia (CIMATEC) (Integrated Campus of Manufacturing and Technology);
- Faculdade Castro Alves (FCA) (Castro Alves College);
- Centro Universitário Jorge Amado (UNIJORGE) (Jorge Amado University Center);
- Escola Bahiana de Medicina e Saúde Pública (EBMSP) (Bahian School of Medicine and Public Health);

=== Primary and secondary schools ===
Top high schools of the city according to Exame Nacional do Ensino Médio are:

- Pan American School of Bahia
- Colégio Marista
- Colégio São Paulo
- Colégio Oficina
- Colégio Anchieta
- Federal Institute of Bahia (IFBA)
- Colégio Bernoulli
- Cândido Portinari Academy
- Colégio Antônio Vieira
- Colégio Módulo
- Military College of Salvador
- Colégio Sartre Escola SEB
- Colégio Integral
- Colégio Gregor Mendel

== Public safety ==
Salvador is one of the most crime-ridden cities in the country. The number of homicides increased 418% from 2000 to 2010. From 1998 to 2008, the number of homicides of youths between the ages of 15 and 24 increased 435.1%. Gun violence in the state of Bahia more than doubled in the period from 2004 to 2014, and the city is in the top ten for gun violence of the 26 state capitals of Brazil. In 2014 the state of Bahia had the most murders in the country. At the same time, Salvador has one of the lowest rates of suicide in the nation.

== Culture ==
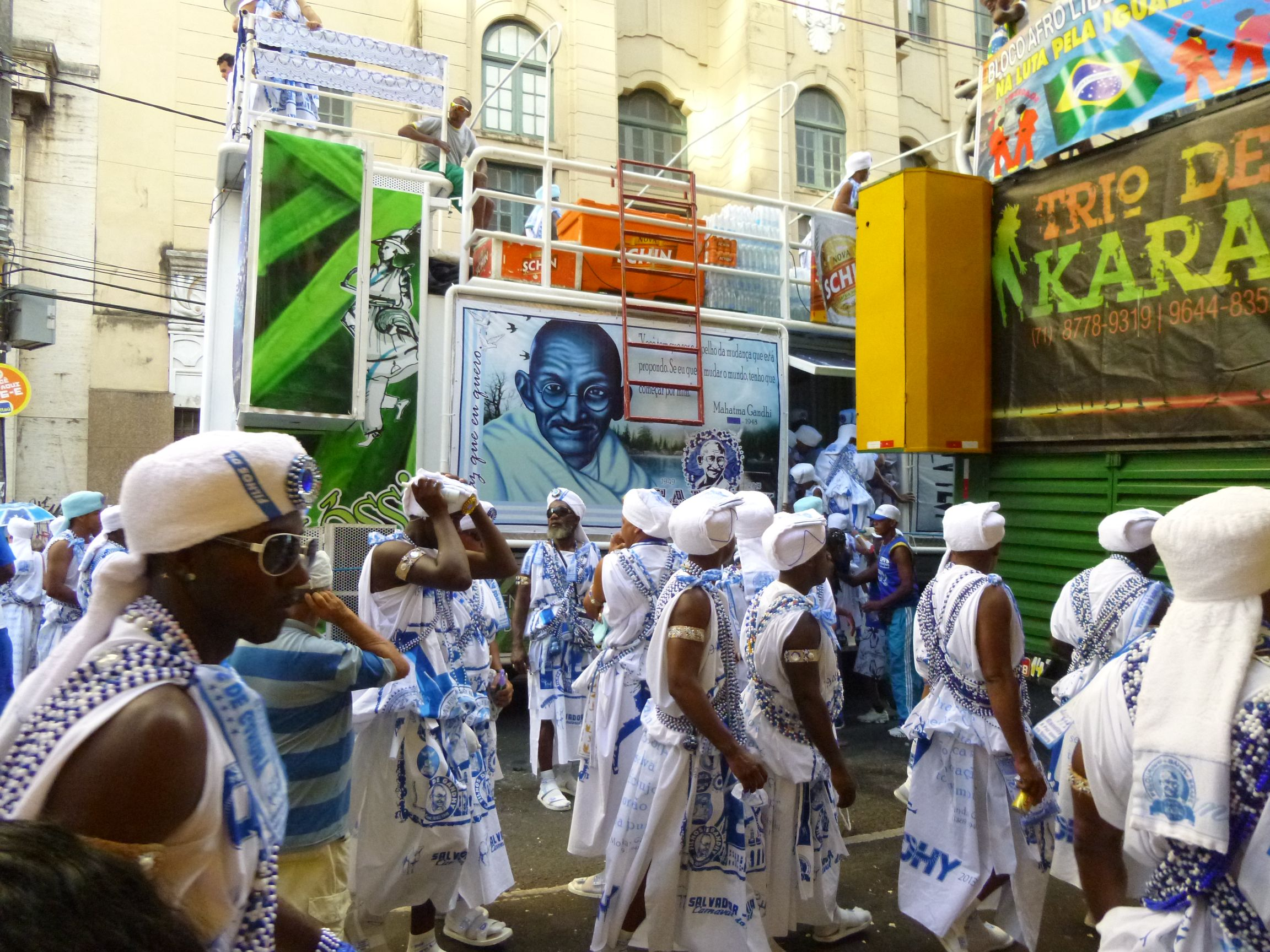
Filhos de Gandhy carnival 2013 Salvador Bahia.

Salvador's historical and cultural aspects were inherited by the intermarriage of such ethnic groups as Native-Indian, African and European. This mixture can be seen in the religion, cuisine, cultural manifestations, and custom of Bahia's people. African cultural practices are particularly celebrated.

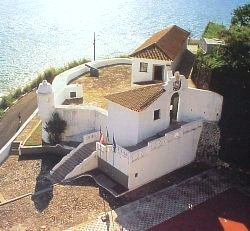
Forte de São Diogo in Barra neighborhood

=== Literature ===
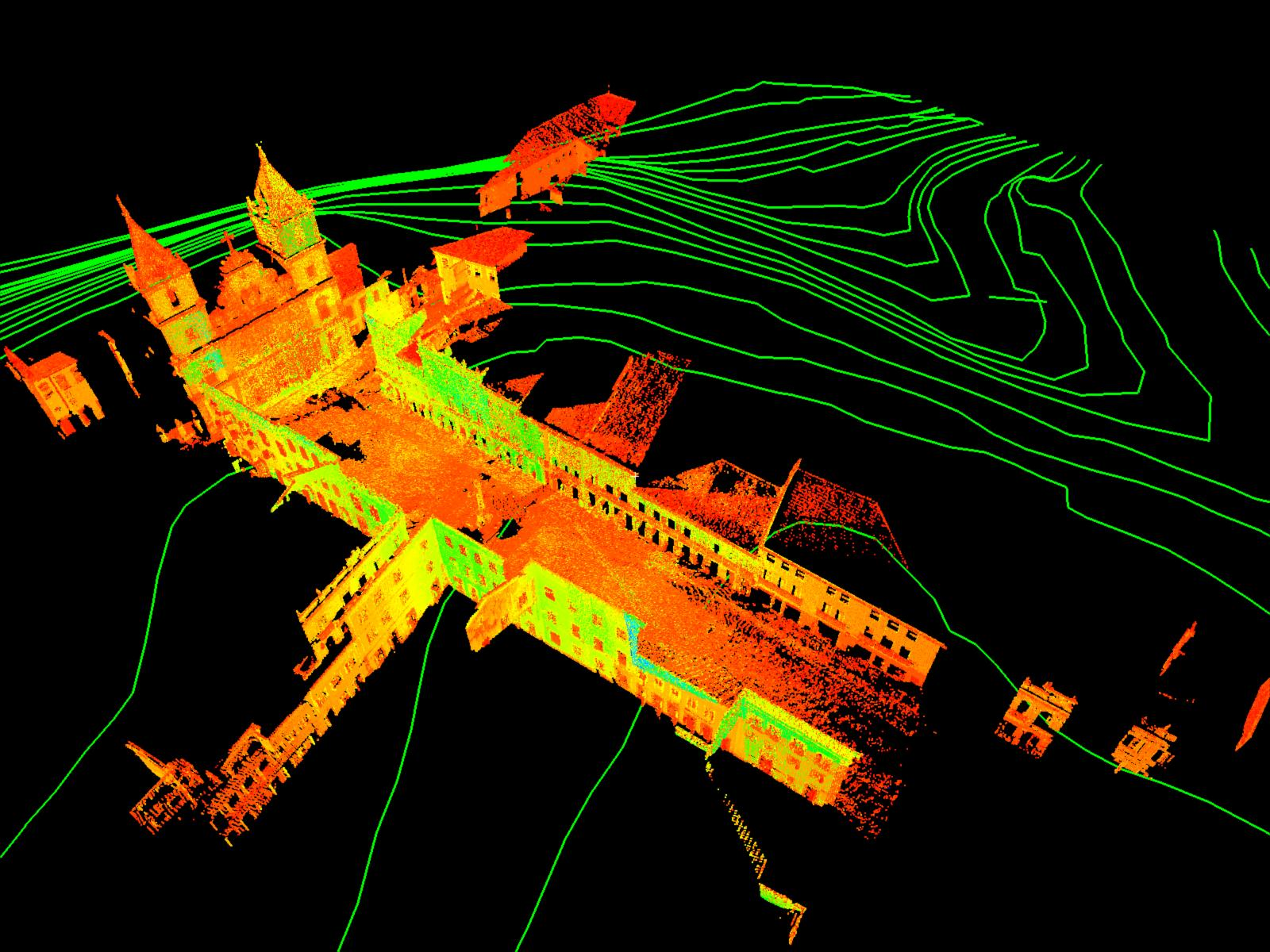
Perspective view of the Salvador Bahia Pelourinho's Anchieta Plaza, cut from a Laser Scan preservationist project conducted by nonprofit CyArk.

Gregório de Mattos, born in Salvador in 1636, was also educated by the Jesuits. He became the most important Baroque poet in colonial Brazil for his religious and satirical works. Father António Vieira was born in Lisbon in 1608, but was raised and educated in the Jesuit school of Salvador and died in the city in 1697. His erudite sermons have earned him the title of best writer of the Portuguese language in the Baroque era.

After the Independence of Brazil (1822), Salvador continued to play an important role in Brazilian literature. Significant 19th-century writers associated with the city include Romantic poet Castro Alves (1847–1871) and diplomat Ruy Barbosa (1849–1923). In the 20th century, Bahia-born Jorge Amado (1912–2001), although not born in Salvador, helped popularize the culture of the city around the world in novels such as Jubiabá, Dona Flor e Seus Dois Maridos, and Tenda dos Milagres, the settings of which are in Salvador.

In 1987, the Jorge Amado House Foundation was founded, an institution that houses the collection of Jorge Amado and Zélia Gattai and also serves as a museum and a center for the promotion of literature.

=== Cuisine ===
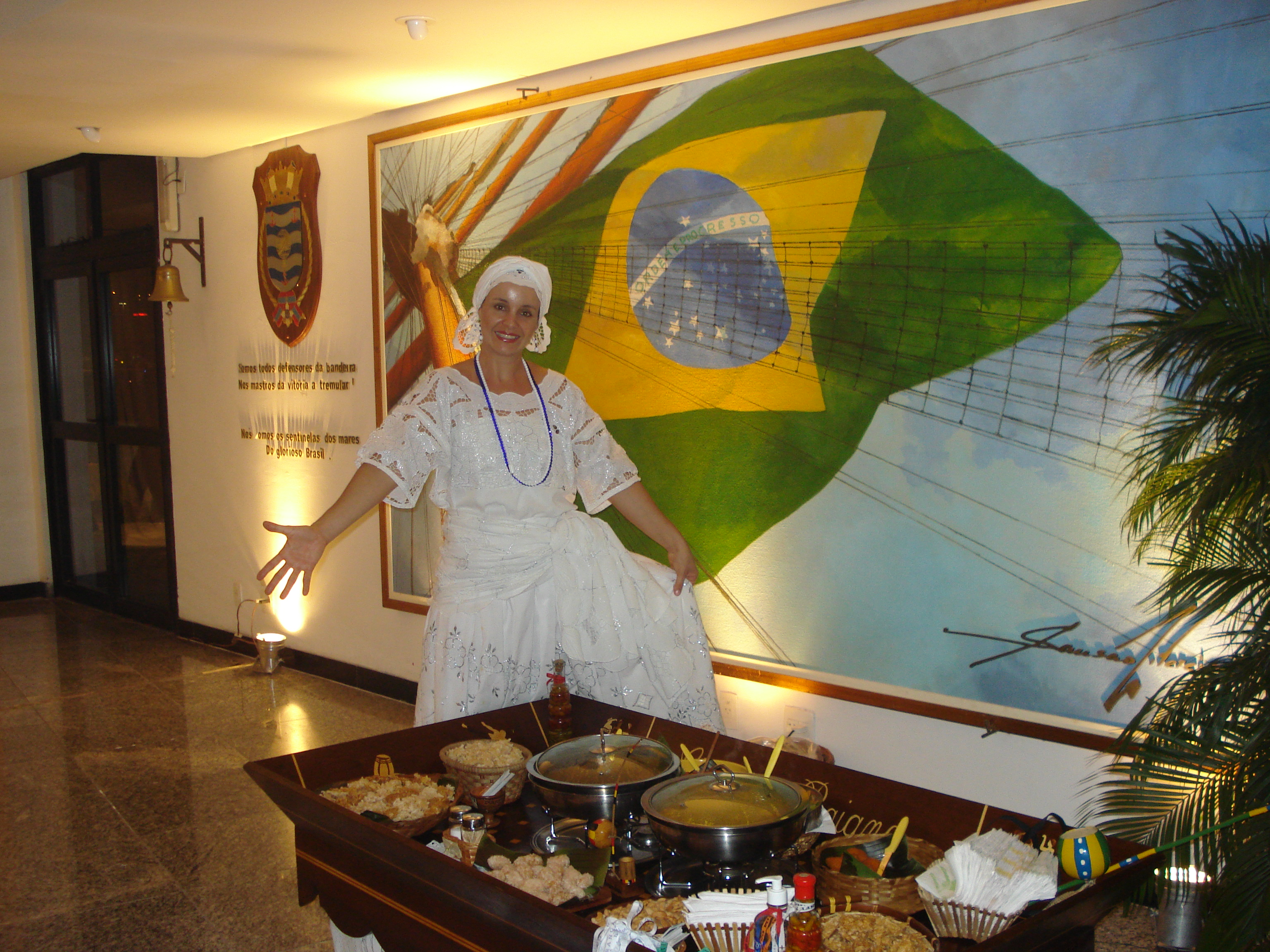
Acarajé is a traditional street food in Salvador.

The local cuisine, spicy and based on seafood (shrimp, fish), strongly relies on typically African ingredients and techniques, and is much appreciated throughout Brazil and internationally. The most typical ingredient is azeite-de-dendê, an oil extracted from a palm tree (Elaeis guineensis) brought from West Africa to Brazil during colonial times.

Using the milky coconut juice, they prepared a variety of seafood based dishes, such as Ensopados, Moquecas and Escabeche. The sugar cane bagasse was mixed with molasses and Rapadura, in the creation of coconut desserts like Cocada Branca and Preta. The remaining of the Portuguese Stew sauce was mixed with manioc flour to make a mush, which is a traditional Indian dish. In the markets of Salvador, it is possible to find stands selling typical dishes of the colonial era. In the Sete Portas Market, customers eat Mocotó on Friday nights since the 1940s, when the market was inaugurated. In the restaurants of Mercado Modelo, Sarapatel, stews and several fried dishes are served regularly. In the São Joaquim, Santa Bárbara and São Miguel markets, there are stands selling typical food. They are also sold at stands located on the beaches, specially crab stews and oysters. The restaurants that sell typical dishes are located mostly along the coast and in Pelourinho. They prepare a wide variety of recipes that take palm tree oil.

Traditional dishes include caruru, vatapá, acarajé, bobó-de-camarão, moqueca baiana, and abará. Some of these dishes, like the acarajé and abará, are also used as offerings in Candomblé rituals. But Salvador is not only typical food. Other recipes created by the slaves were the Haussá Rice (rice and jerked beef cooked together), the Munguzá, used as offering to the Candomblé deity Oxalá (who is the father of all deities, according to the religion) pleased the matrons very much. So did the Bolinhos the Fubá, the Cuscuz (cornmeal) and the Mingau (porridge). According to Arany Santana, the African Ipetê (used in the rituals to the deity Oxum) became the Shrimp bobó, and the Akará (honoring the deities Xangô and Iansã) became the world-famous Acarajé. The city has restaurants specialized on international cuisine also. There are also places that serve dishes from other states of Brazil, especially from Minas Gerais and the Northeast region.

=== Capoeira ===
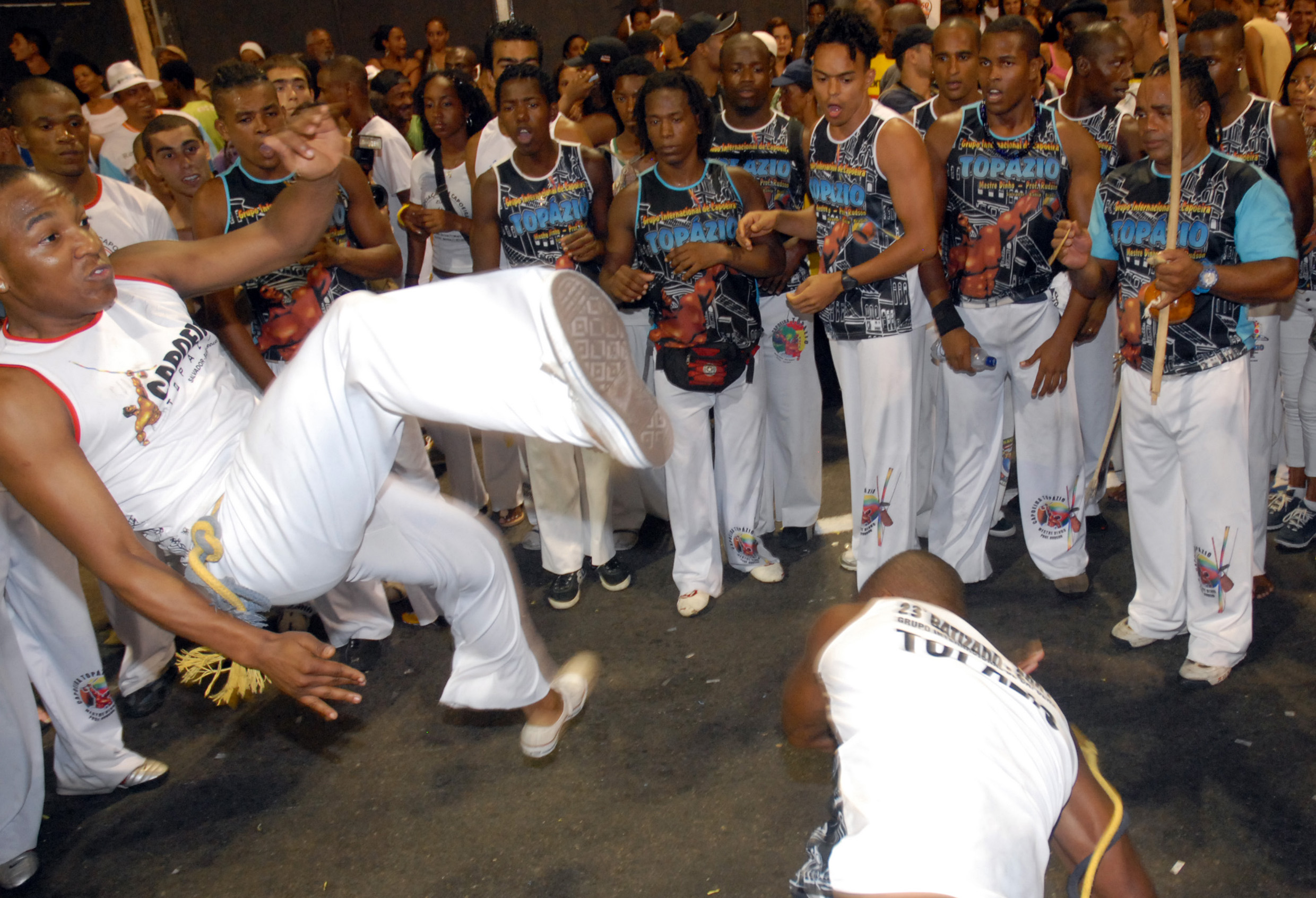
Capoeira in Salvador

Capoeira is a unique mix of dance and martial art of Afro-Brazilian origin, combining agile dance moves with unarmed combat techniques. Capoeira in Portuguese literally means "chicken coop". The capoeira appeared in Quilombo dos Palmares, located in the Captaincy of Pernambuco, and Salvador is considered the home of modern capoeira branches. In the first half of the 20th century, Salvador-born masters Mestre Bimba and Mestre Pastinha founded capoeira schools and helped standardize and popularize the art in Brazil and the world. In recent years, Capoeira has become more international and accessible even in Salvador.

=== Museums ===
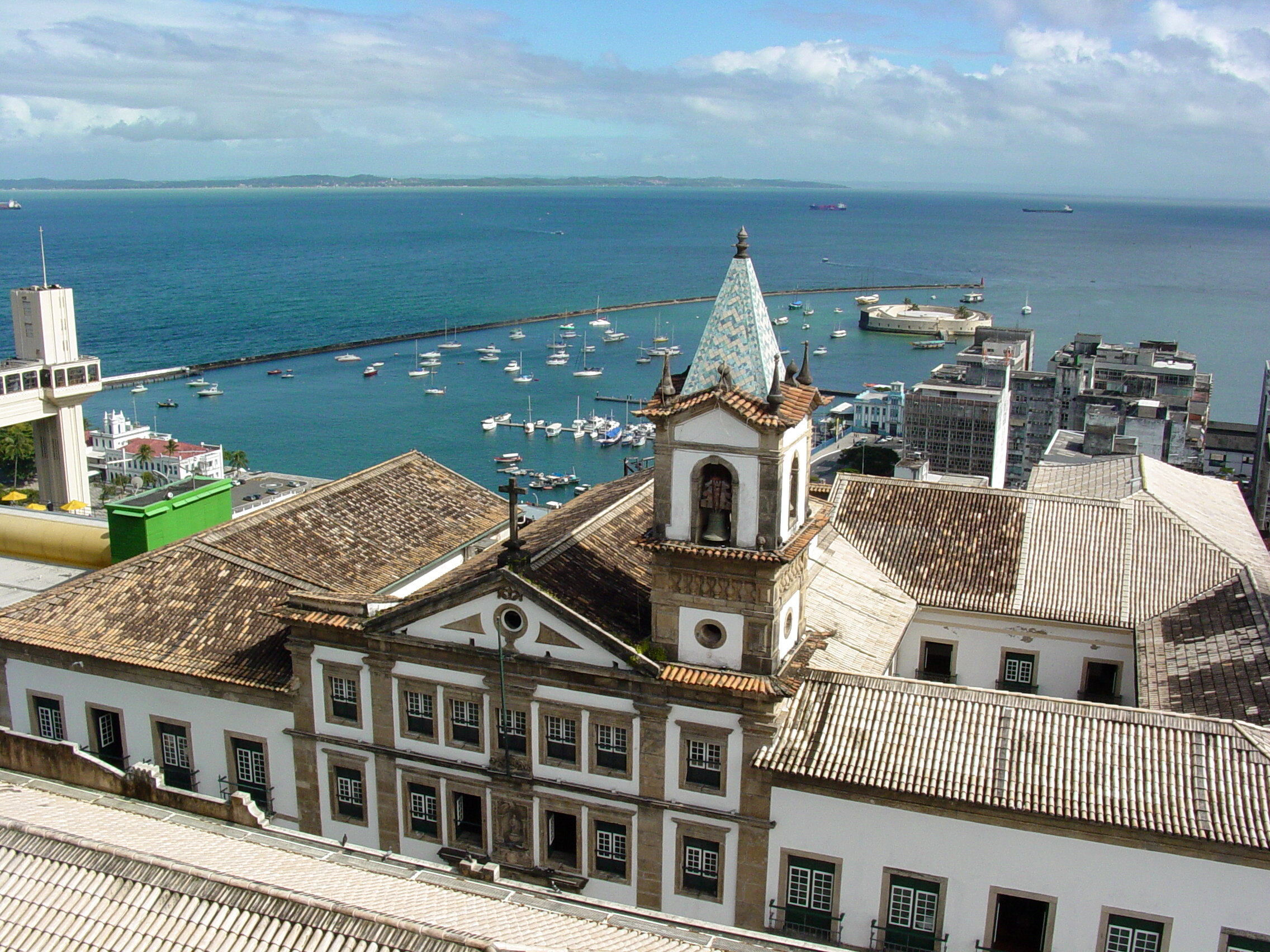
Old Customs in Pelourinho

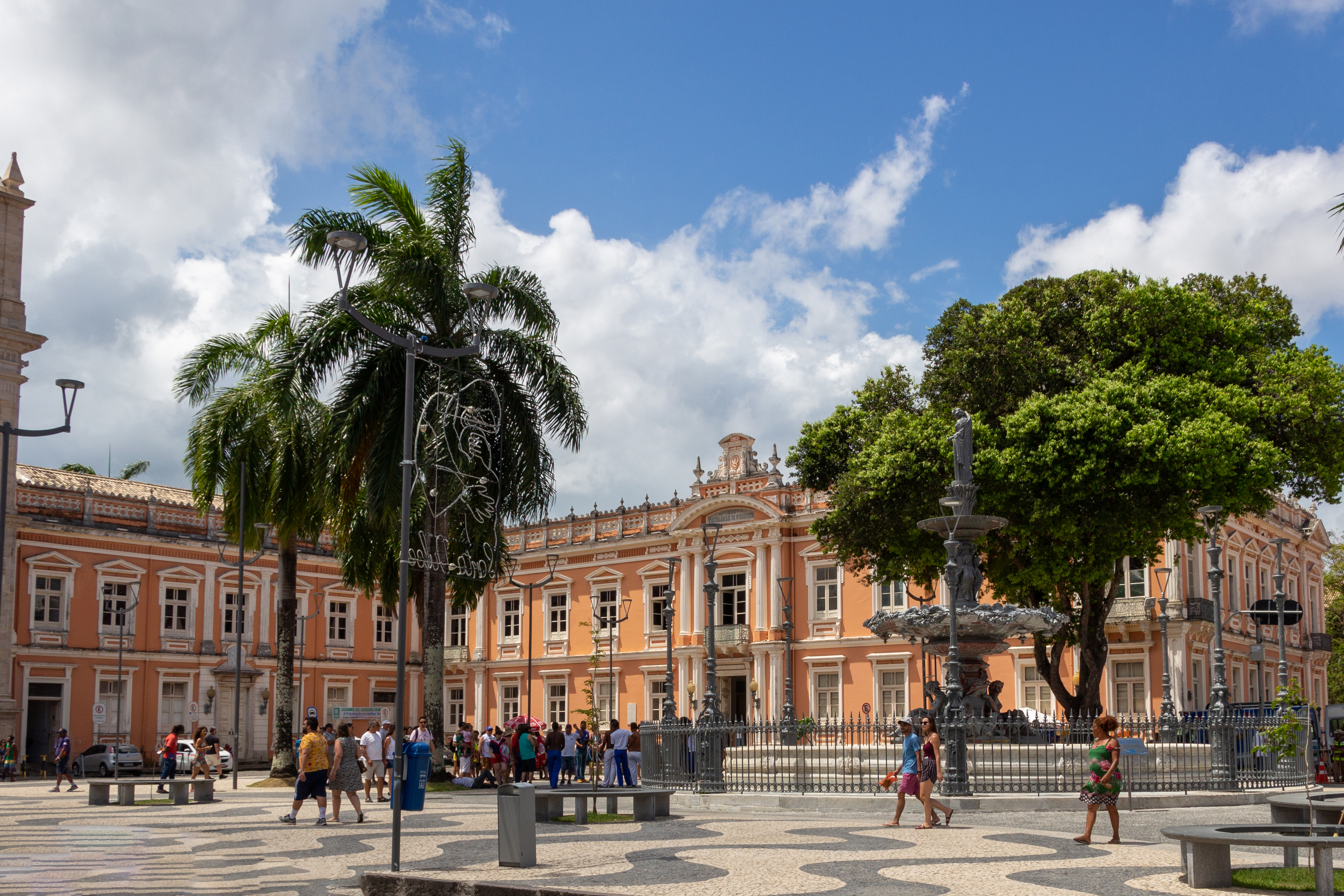
Faculty of Medicine of the Federal University of Bahia.

The artistic, cultural and social heritage of Salvador is preserved in museums. From Museu de Arte da Bahia (MAB), which is the oldest in the State, to Museu Náutico, the newest, the first capital of Brazil displays unique elements of history. Museu de Arte da Bahia has paintings, Chinese porcelain, furniture and sacred images from the 17th and 18th centuries. Museu Costa Pinto has privately owned items such as, pieces of art, crystal objects, and furniture from the 18th and 19th centuries. Museu da Cidade, where many items that help to preserve the heritage of old Salvador are kept. The Museum of Modern Art of Bahia, established in 1960, is located at a historic site on the Bay of All Saints, Solar da União.

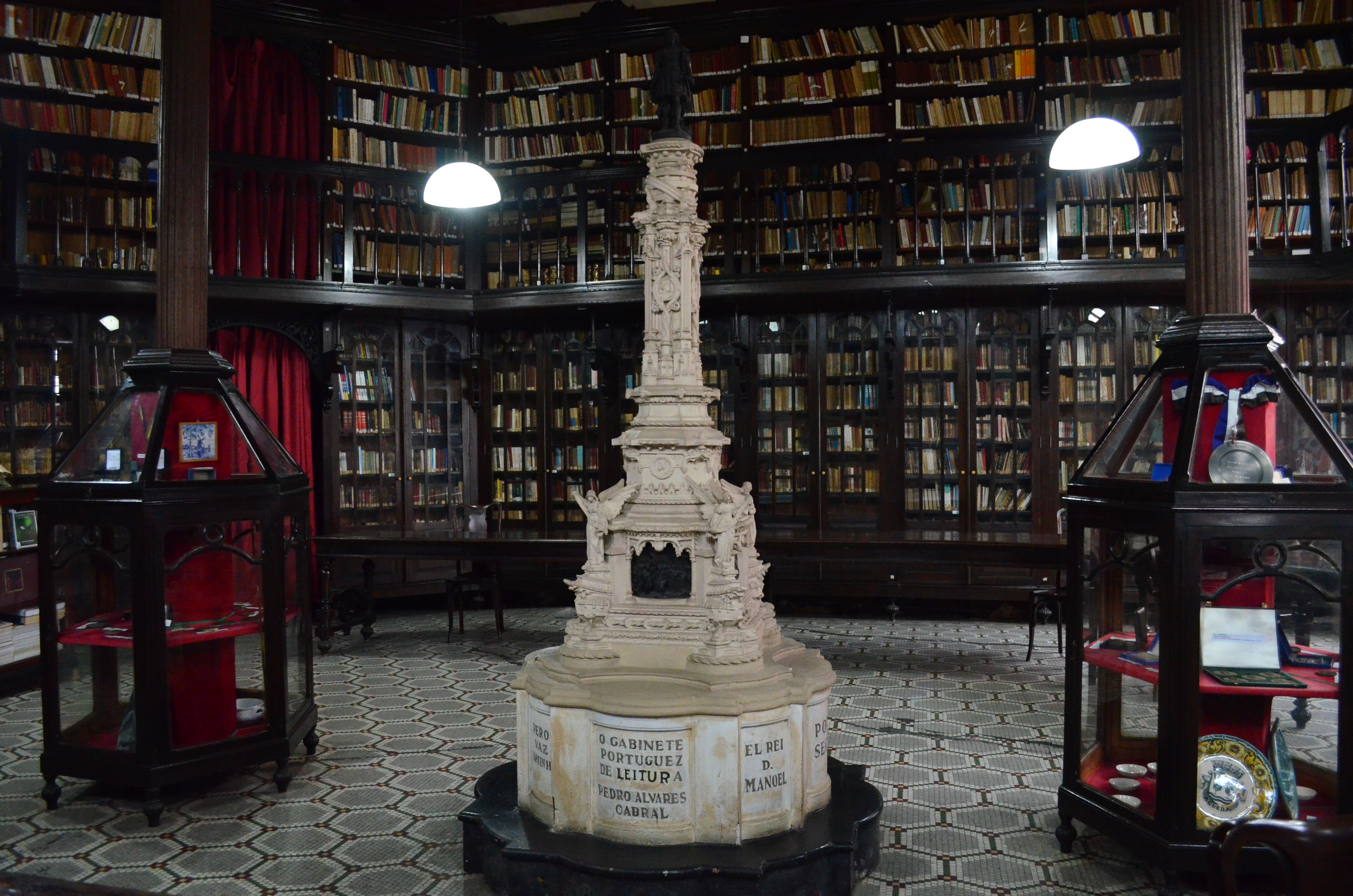
Royal Portuguese Reading Cabinet interior view.

Some churches and monasteries also have museums located in their premises. Examples of this are the Carmo da Misericórdia and São Bento museums. After the forts were renovated, Museu Náutico was established in the Forte de Santo Antonio da Barra (Farol da Barra) and the Museum of Communication in Forte São Diogo. Other important museums located in Salvador are: Museu do Cacau, State Museum of Geology, Museu tempostal, Solar do Ferrão, Museu de Arte Antiga e Popular Henriqueta M Catharino, Museu Eugênio Teixeira Leal, Museu Rodin Bahia, and Museu das Portas do Carmo.

=== Public art ===
The streets of Salvador are decorated with numerous murals and sculptures, many of which have been produced by the resident artist Bel Borba, a native of the city.

=== Carnival ===
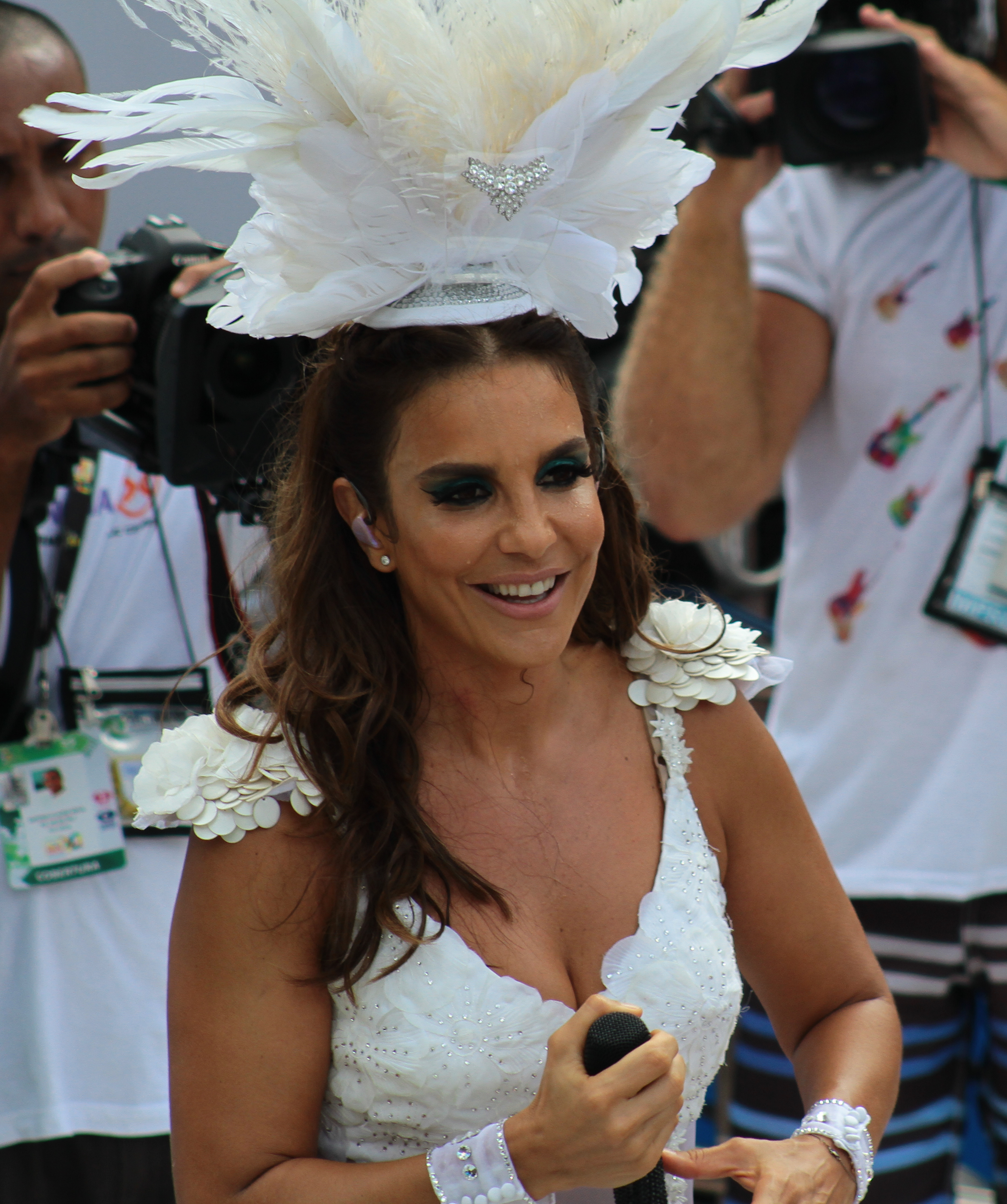
The Bahian singer Ivete Sangalo in Barra – Ondina Circuit, on Oceanic Avenue

The Bahian Carnival (Portuguese: Carnaval) is the largest party on the planet. Its dimensions are gigantic. For an entire week, almost 4 million people celebrate throughout 25 km (16 miles) of streets, avenues, and squares. The direct organization of the party involves the participation of over 100,000 people and Salvador receives an average of over 800,000 visitors. The affair is heavily policed and covered. Streets are patrolled by lines of police in single file and guarded by seated teams of five or six officers. In 2010, coverage was provided by 4,446 journalists from the local, national, and international press and broadcast to 135 countries through 65 radio stations, 75 magazines, 139 video productions, 97 newspapers (including 21 international papers), 14 tv stations, and 168 websites.

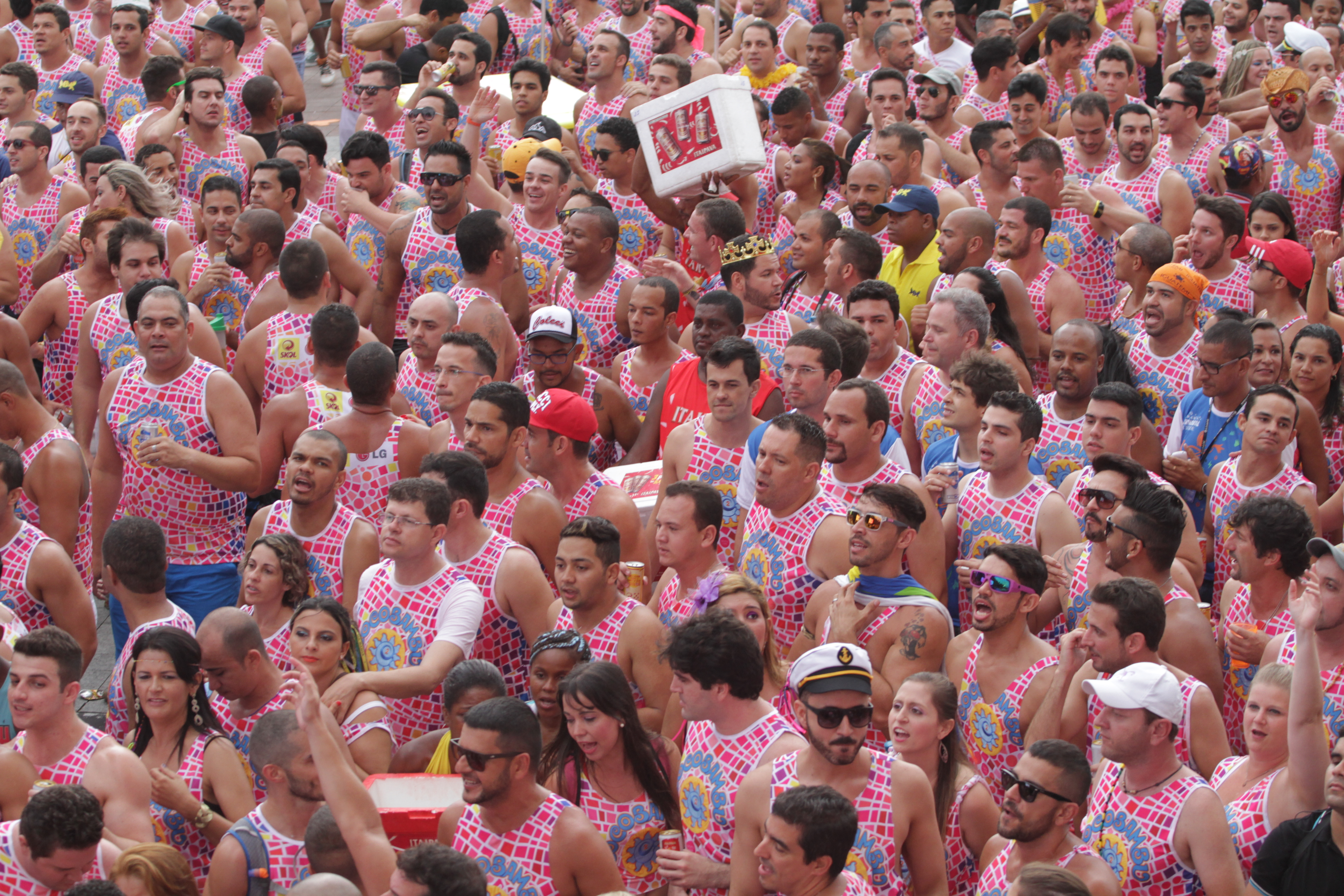
Salvador's Street Carnival, one of the largest in the world

Much of the music played is axé or samba-reggae. Groups known as blocos participate, with the most famous being the blocos afros such as Malé Debalé, Olodum, and Filhos de Gandhi.

The parades are organized into separate circuits. The Osmar Circuit, the oldest, goes from Campo Grande to Castro Alves Square. The Downtown Circuit runs through downtown and Pelourinho. The Dodô Circuit goes from Farol da Barra to Ondina along the coast. Since the Osmar Circuit is the oldest, it is where the event's most traditional groups parade. In Dodô, where the artist box seats are located, the party becomes lively toward the end of the afternoon and continues until morning.

=== Music ===
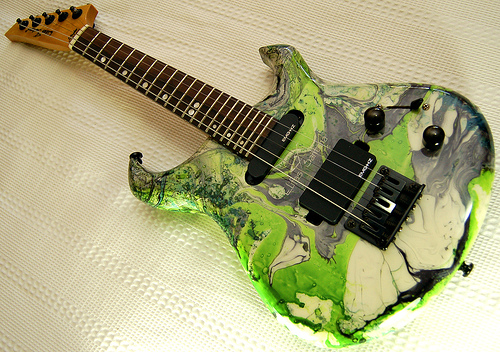
The Bahian guitar is an instrument with four, five or six strings, created in Salvador - Bahia.

The city of Salvador is home to groups known as "blocos-afros", including Ilê Aiyê, Olodum and Timbalada, where they represent, in their visual and musical figures, African indoles, who are based in the city of Salvador in the historical ethnicity due to colonization and success the Axé.

Xisto Bahia from Salvador recorded the song Isto É Bom in 1902; many Brazilian music specialists consider this the first song ever recorded in Brazil.

The music video for Sepultura's nu metal song, Roots Bloody Roots, was filmed in Salvador.

Black Bahia Funk Balls play more American music—including English music—than their counterparts in Rio, while Rio's music is considered inferior and less played. The local dancehalls which host the balls are also distinct.

Matrix Radio, which includes difficult and otherwise impossible to find music of Salvador and Bahia and which consists of music formerly available in Cana Brava Records, formerly located in Salvador's Centro Histórico (Pelourinho), was named by British journal The Guardian as one of "10 of the best music radio stations around the world".

Matrix Radio is part of a broader project called the Matrix Online Network, a "matrix" in the word's original sense of "source", created to make the music and musicians of Bahia accessible within a global network of artists and creators.

The Matrix Online Network is a continuing extension of the Cana Brava record store's focus on preserving Bahian musical culture.

=== Libraries ===
The first books that arrived in Salvador, were brought by the Jesuits, who came with Tomé de Souza. The first libraries or bookstores that appeared were under the control of the religious missionaries and were mostly composed of books on religion.

=== Handcrafts ===
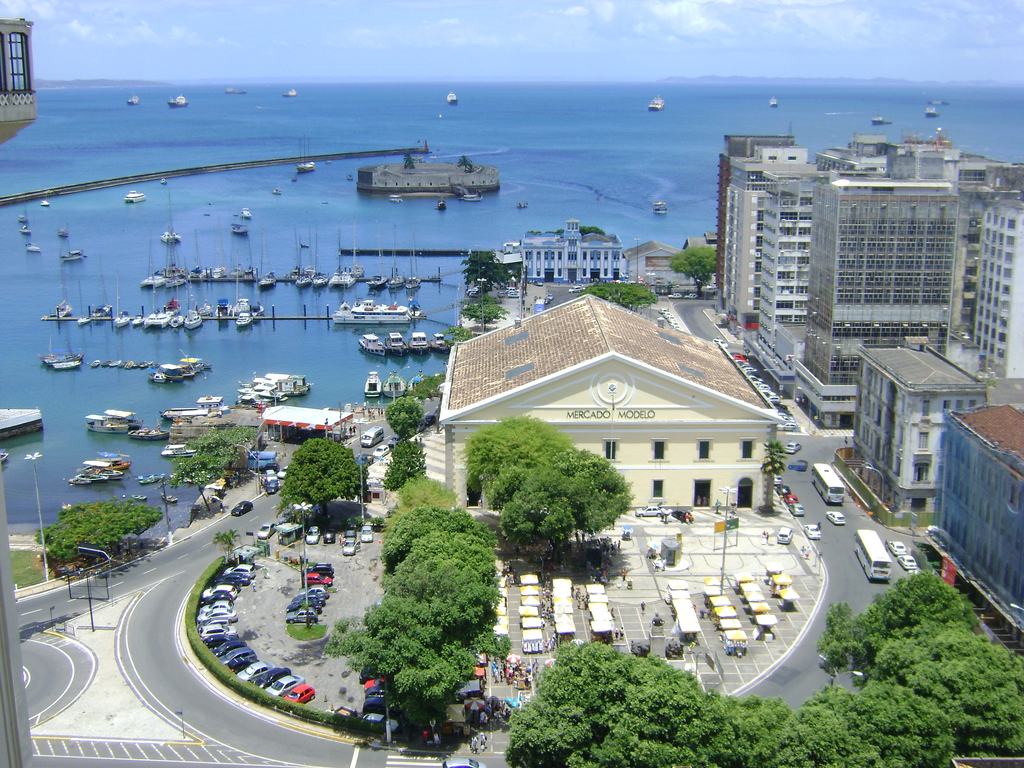
Modelo Public Market.

The handcraft legacy of Bahia using only raw materials (straw, leather, clay, wood, seashells and beads), the most rudimentary crafts are reasonably inexpensive. Other pieces are created with the use of metals like gold, silver, copper and brass. The most sophisticated ones are ornamented with precious and semi-precious gems. The craftsmen and women generally choose religion as the main theme of their work.

They portray the images of Catholic saints and Candomble deities on their pieces. The good luck charms such as the clenched fist, the four-leaf clover, the garlic and the famous Bonfim ribbons express the city's religious syncretism. Nature is also portrayed on these pieces, reflecting the local wildlife. Music appears in the atabaque drums, the rain sticks, the water drums and the famous berimbau, along with other typical instruments.

Salvador holds an international reputation as a city where musical instruments that produce unique sounds are made. These instruments are frequently used by world-famous artists in their recording sessions. The main handcrafts production in Salvador is located in Mercado Modelo, which is the biggest handcraft center in Latin America.

Pieces can also be purchased at Instituto de Artesanato de Mauá and at Instituto do Patrimônio Artístico e Cultural (IPAC). These are organizations that promote typical art in Bahia.

== Transportation ==
=== Airport ===
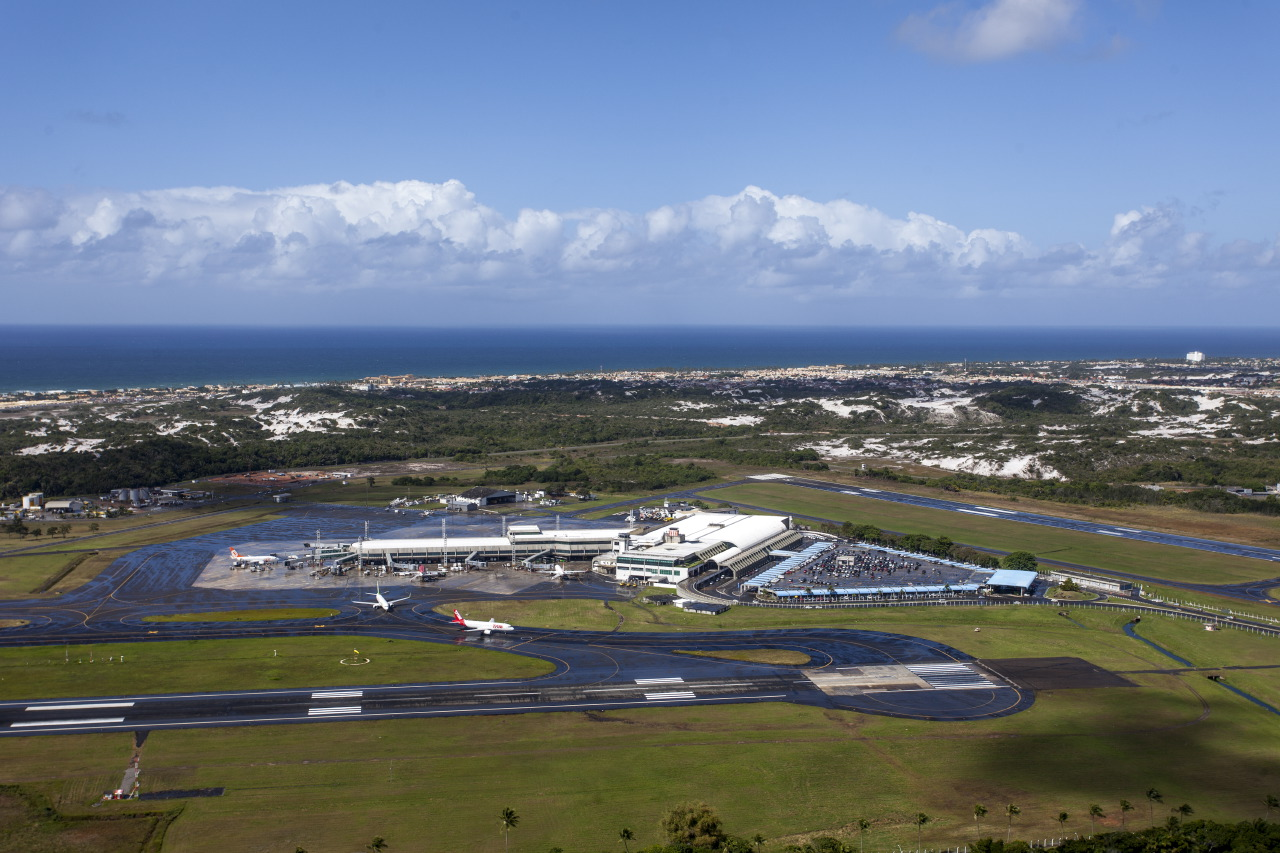
Deputado Luís Eduardo Magalhães International Airport (SSA)

Deputado Luís Eduardo Magalhães International Airport has an area of 6,900 square metres (74,271 sq ft) between sand dunes and native vegetation. It is 28 km (17 mi) north of Central Salvador, and the road to the airport has already become one of the city's main scenic attractions.

Salvador Air Force Base - BASV, a base of the Brazilian Air Force, is located in Salvador.

=== Port ===
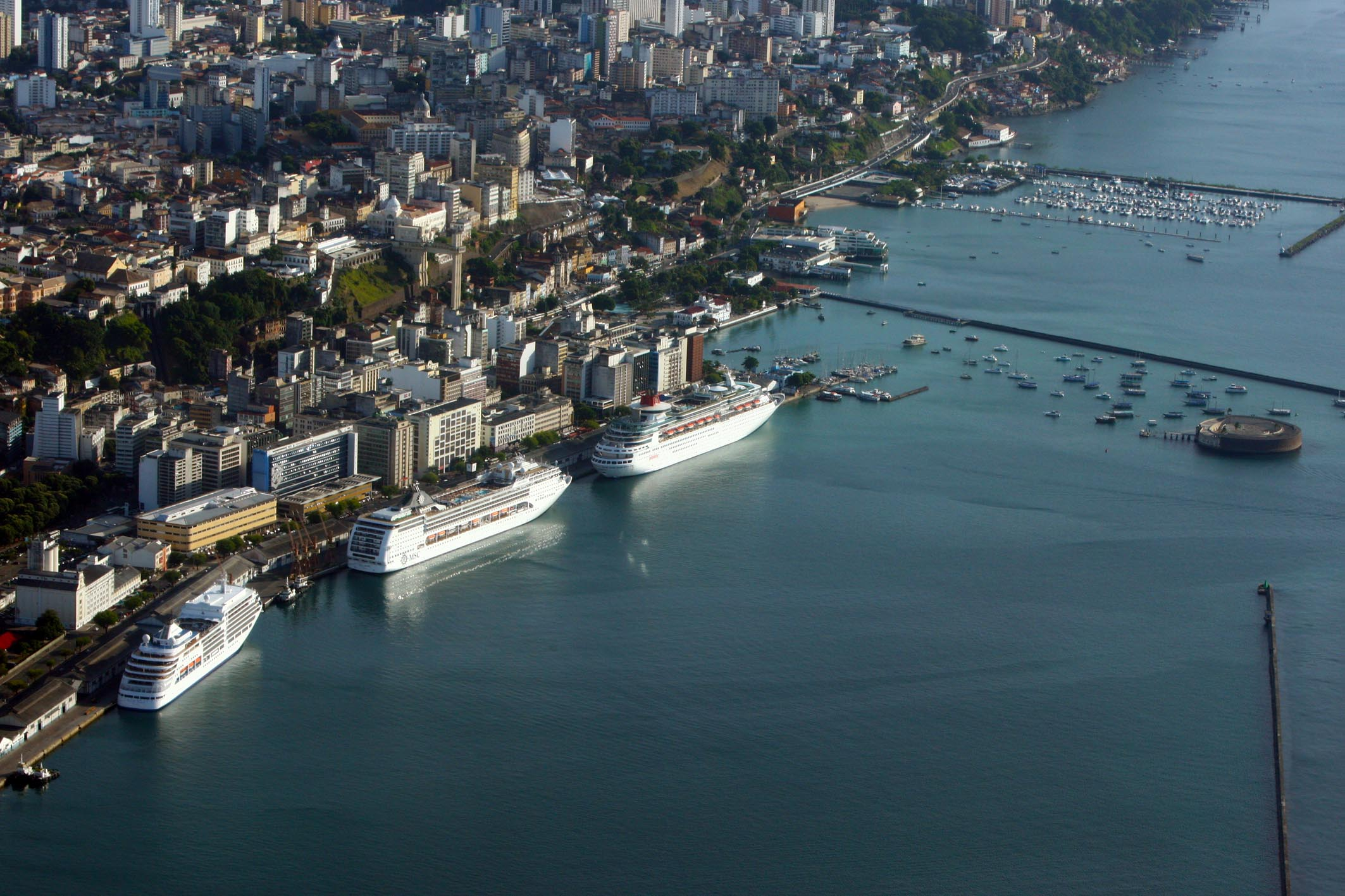
Port of Salvador

With cargo volume that grows every year with the economic growth of the state, the Port of Salvador, located in the Bahia de Todos os Santos, is the port with the most movement of containers of the North/Northeast and the second-leading fruit exporter in Brazil.

=== Metro ===
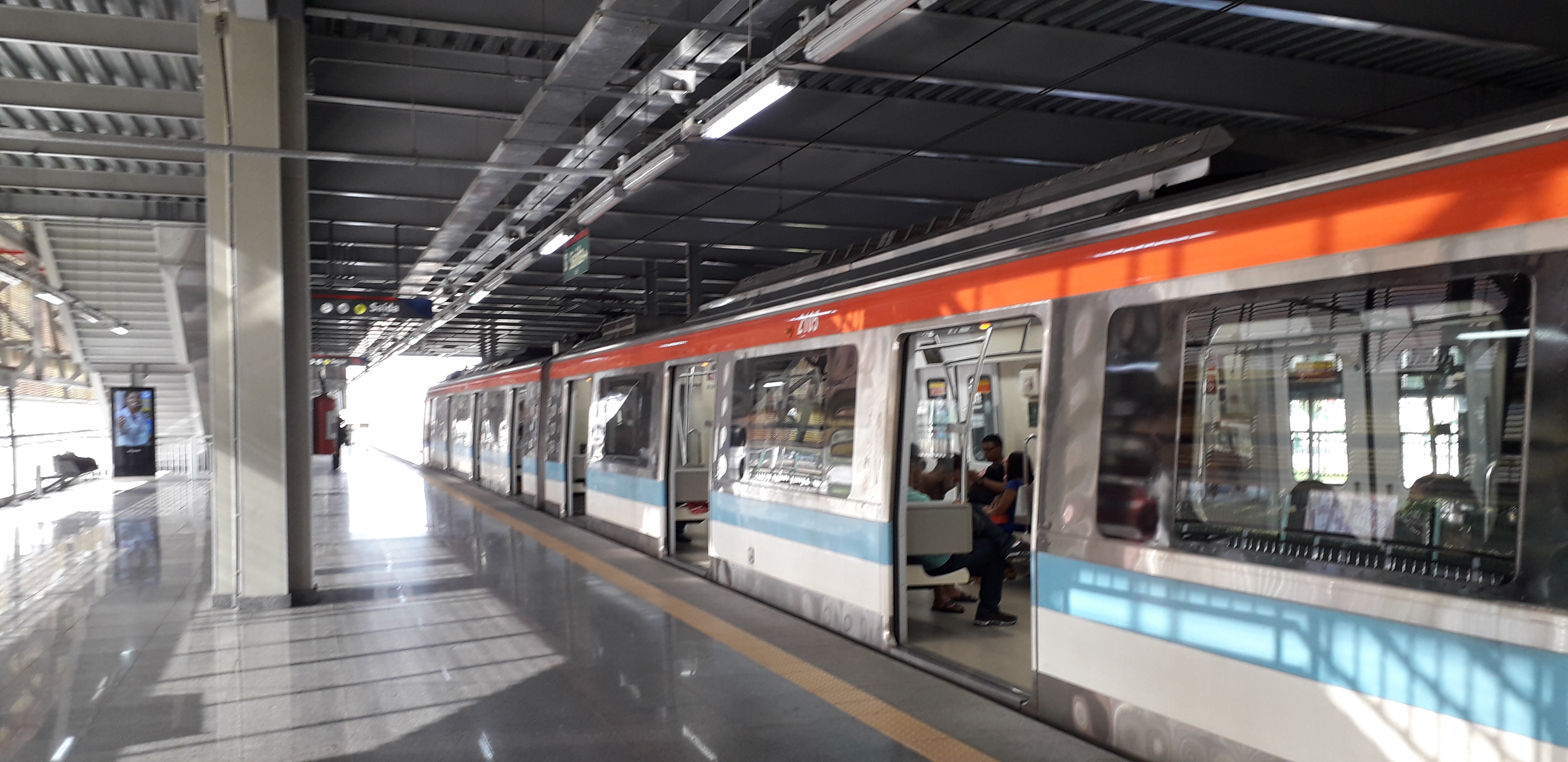
View of Salvador Metro

Salvador Metro System has been in operation since 2014. Its first stage was completed between Lapa and Acesso Norte stations and was later expanded to include new metro stations between Acesso Norte and Pirajá. Together, these segments form Line 1 of the system. In 2018, the system had 32 km (20 mi) and 20 stations and linked with the bus system.

The main shareholders in Metro Salvador are the Spanish companies Construcciones y Auxiliar de Ferrocarriles, Dimetronic, and ICF. It is expected that Metro Salvador will invest US$150 million in rolling stock, signaling and telecommunications equipment. The contract covers the first 11.9 km (7.4 mi) line from Pirajá to Lapa, which was originally due to open in 2003. The project is also financed by a US$150 million World Bank loan and contributions from the federal, Bahia state, and Salvador city governments.

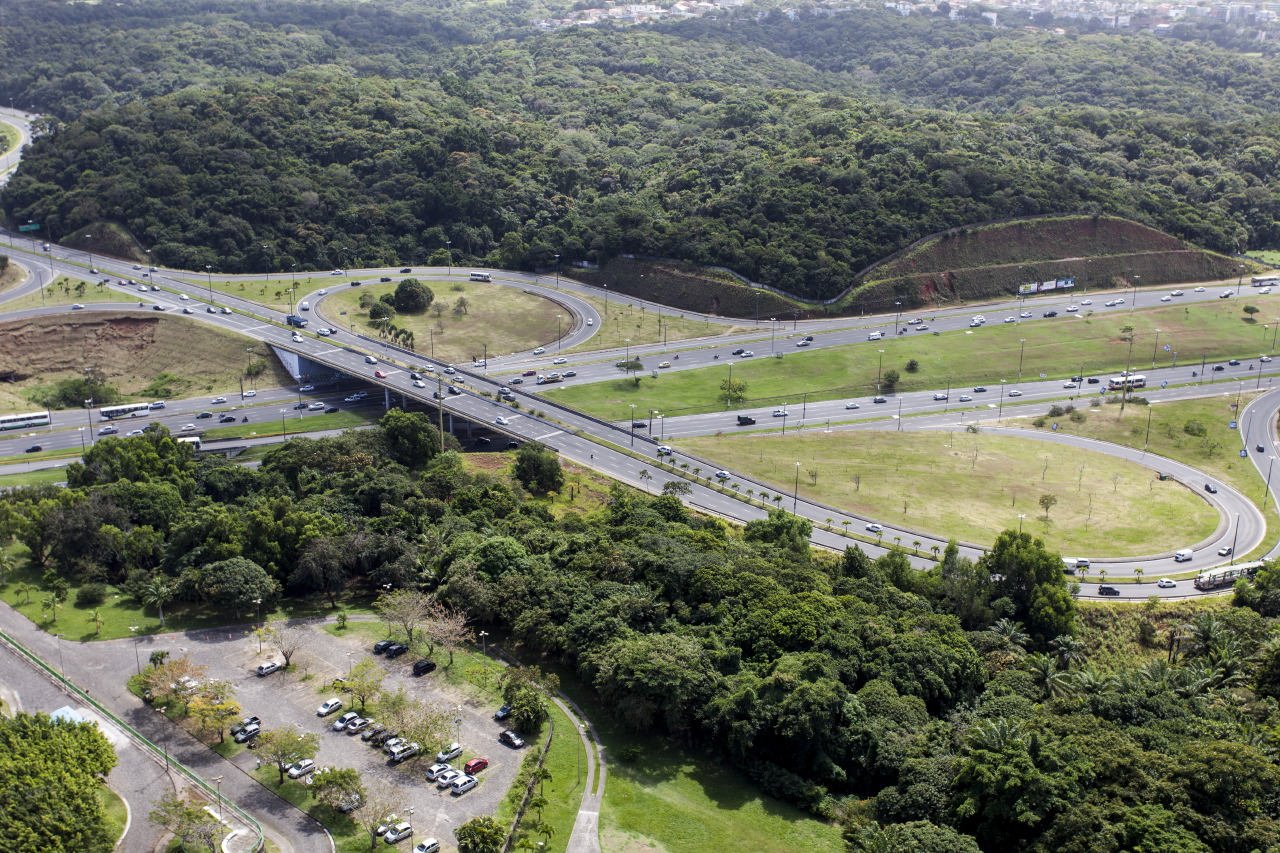
Luís Eduardo Magalhães viaduct.

The creation of the system was one of the actions for urban mobility in preparation for the 2014 FIFA World Cup. The connection of Line 2 with Line 1 connects Magalhães International Airport to Downtown Salvador and the Fonte Nova Stadium. Line 2 also integrates Rótula do Abacaxi and the neighboring beach city of Lauro de Freitas.

=== Light rail ===
A two-line SkyRail Bahia monorail network was due to open in 2022. However, this project was canceled in 2023 due to project delays and irregularities, being replaced by the Salvador LRT. The LRT went into partial operation on 29 June 2026.

=== Highways ===
The BR-101 and BR-116 federal highways cross Bahia from north to south, connecting Salvador to the rest of the country. At the Feira de Santana junction, take the BR-324 state highway. The capital of Bahia is served by several coach companies from almost every Brazilian state. BR-242, starting at São Roque do Paraguaçu (transversal direction), is linked to BR-116, bound to the middle–west region. Among the state highways stands BA-099, which makes connection to the north coast and BA-001, which makes connection to the south of Bahia. Buses provide direct service to most major Brazilian cities, including Rio de Janeiro, São Paulo, and Brasília, as well as regional destinations. In 2007, the city had 586,951 vehicles, the largest number of the Northern and Northeastern Brazil. Salvador has 2,500 public buses, and 2 million people are transported every day.

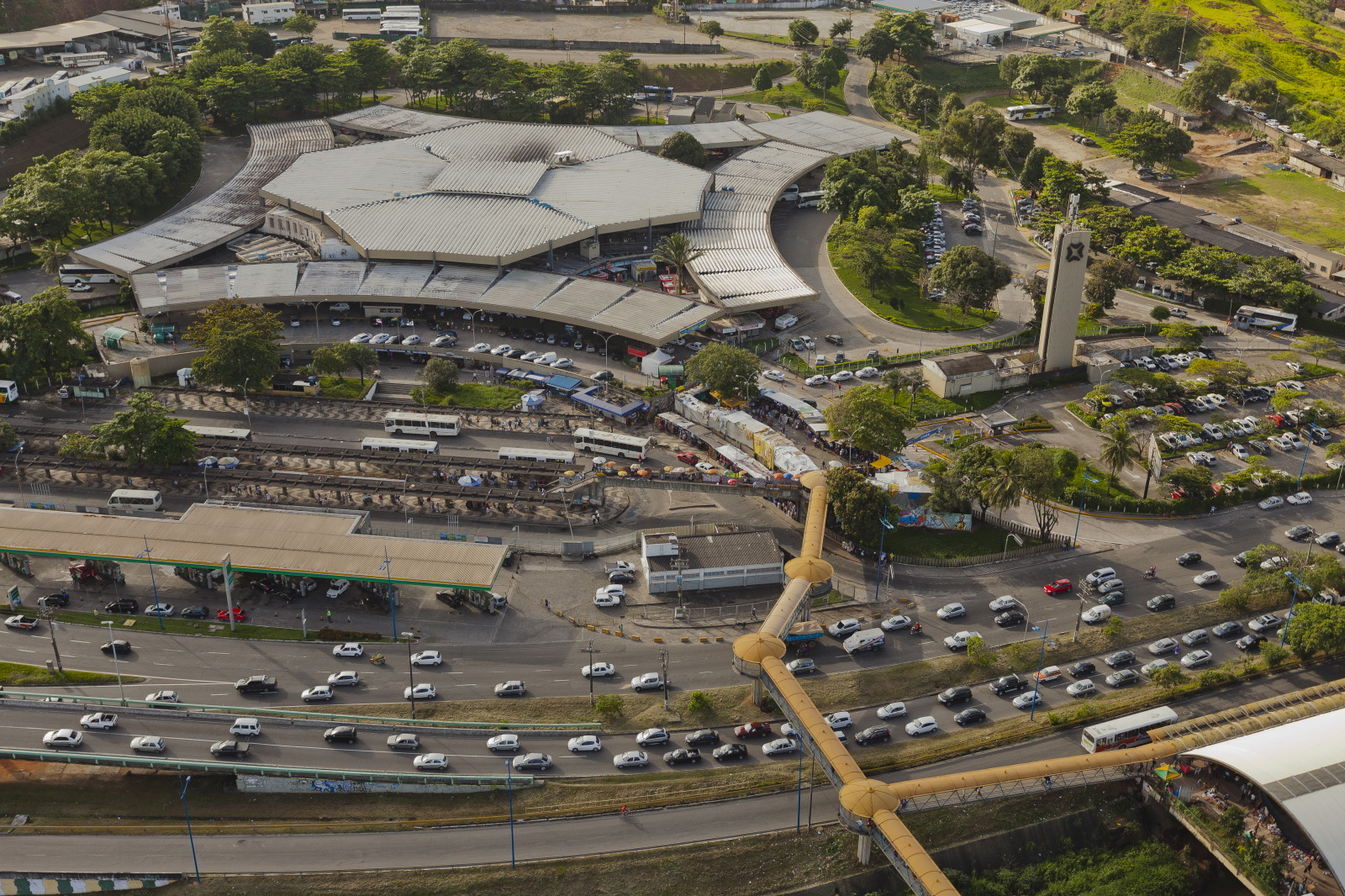
Salvador Bus Station.

The bus station (rodoviária) is in Iguatemi, with direct buses to larger cities in the country and to many other destinations in the state. On the second floor are the counters for the different bus companies, and on the first floor is a small supermarket and a 24 h left luggage. Across the street is a large shopping center, Iguatemi, with a food court, connected by a pedestrian crossing.

Four paved highways connect the city to the national highway system. Running north from the Farol (lighthouse) de Itapoã are hundreds of kilometres of beaches. The beaches are accessible by the BA-099 highway or (Line of Coconut and Green Line), a (toll) road, which is kept in excellent condition, running parallel to the coast, with access roads leading off to the coast itself. The road runs along dunes of snow-white sand, and the coast itself is an almost unbroken line of coconut palms. The communities along the coast range from fishing villages to Praia do Forte.

=== Public transportation statistics ===
The average amount of time people spend commuting with public transit in Salvador, such as to and from work, on a weekday is 94 min, and 33% of public transit riders ride for more than 2 h every day. The average amount of time people wait at a stop or station for public transit is 33 min, and 70% of riders wait for over 20 min on average every day. The average distance that people usually ride in a single trip with public transit is 8 km, and 18% travel for over 12 km in a single trip.

== Neighborhoods ==
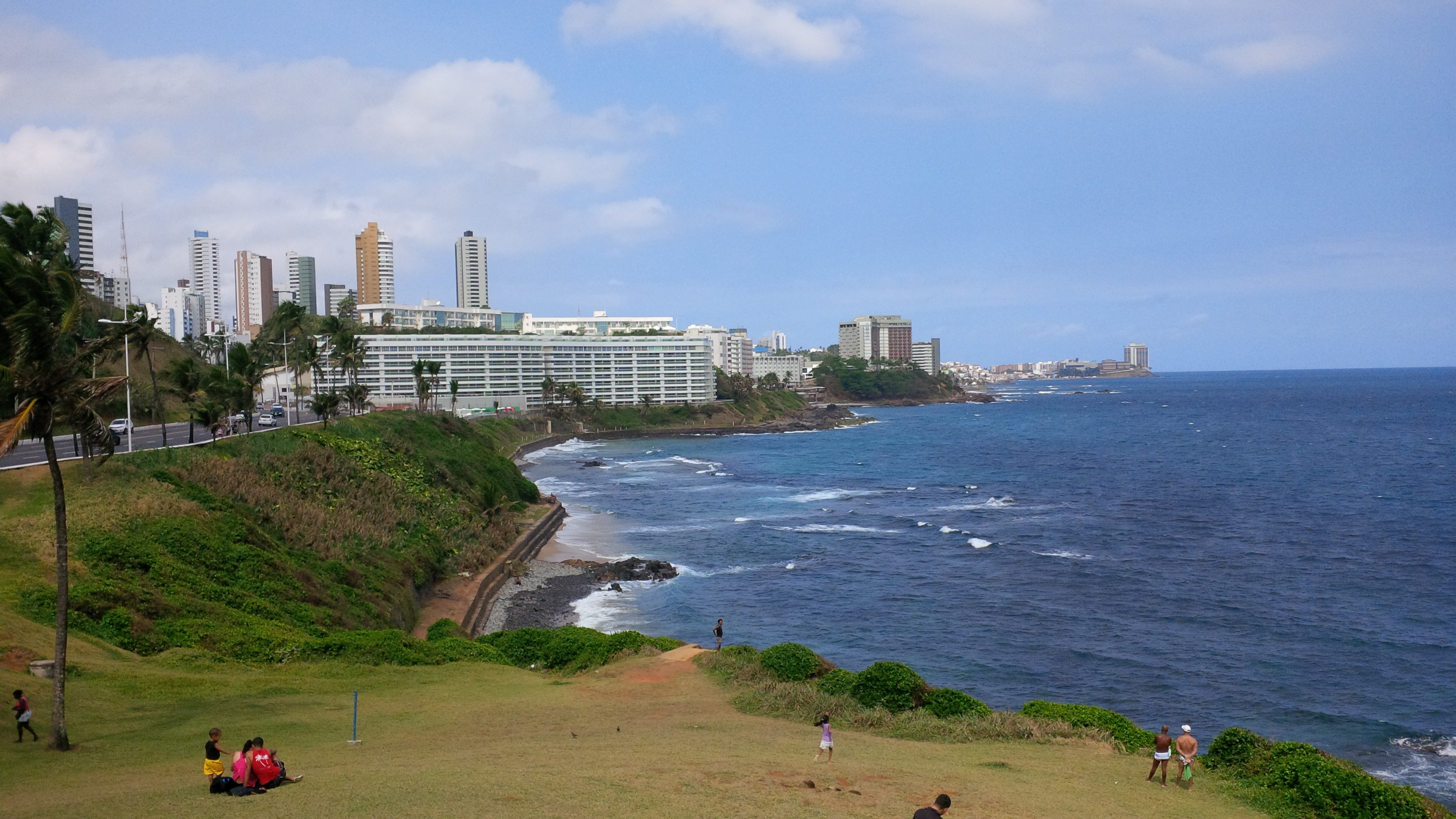
Barra neighborhood in South Zone

Although the creation of Salvador was masterminded by the Kingdom of Portugal and its layout overseen by the Portuguese engineer Luís Dias (who was responsible for the city's original design), the continuous growth of the capital through the decades was completely spontaneous. The walls of the city-fortress could not hold the expansion of the city towards the Carmo and the area where now stands Castro Alves Square. At the time of its foundation, Salvador had only two squares and the first neighborhood ever built here was the Historic City Center. Pelourinho and Carmo came subsequently, created as a consequence of the growing need of space that the religious orders had. With the rapid expansion, the neighborhoods grew and many of them were clustered in the same area, so today there are not accurate records as to their exact number. For urban management purposes, the city is currently divided on 17 political-administrative zones. However, due to their very cultural relevance and to postal conveniences, the importance of the neighborhoods of Salvador remains intact.

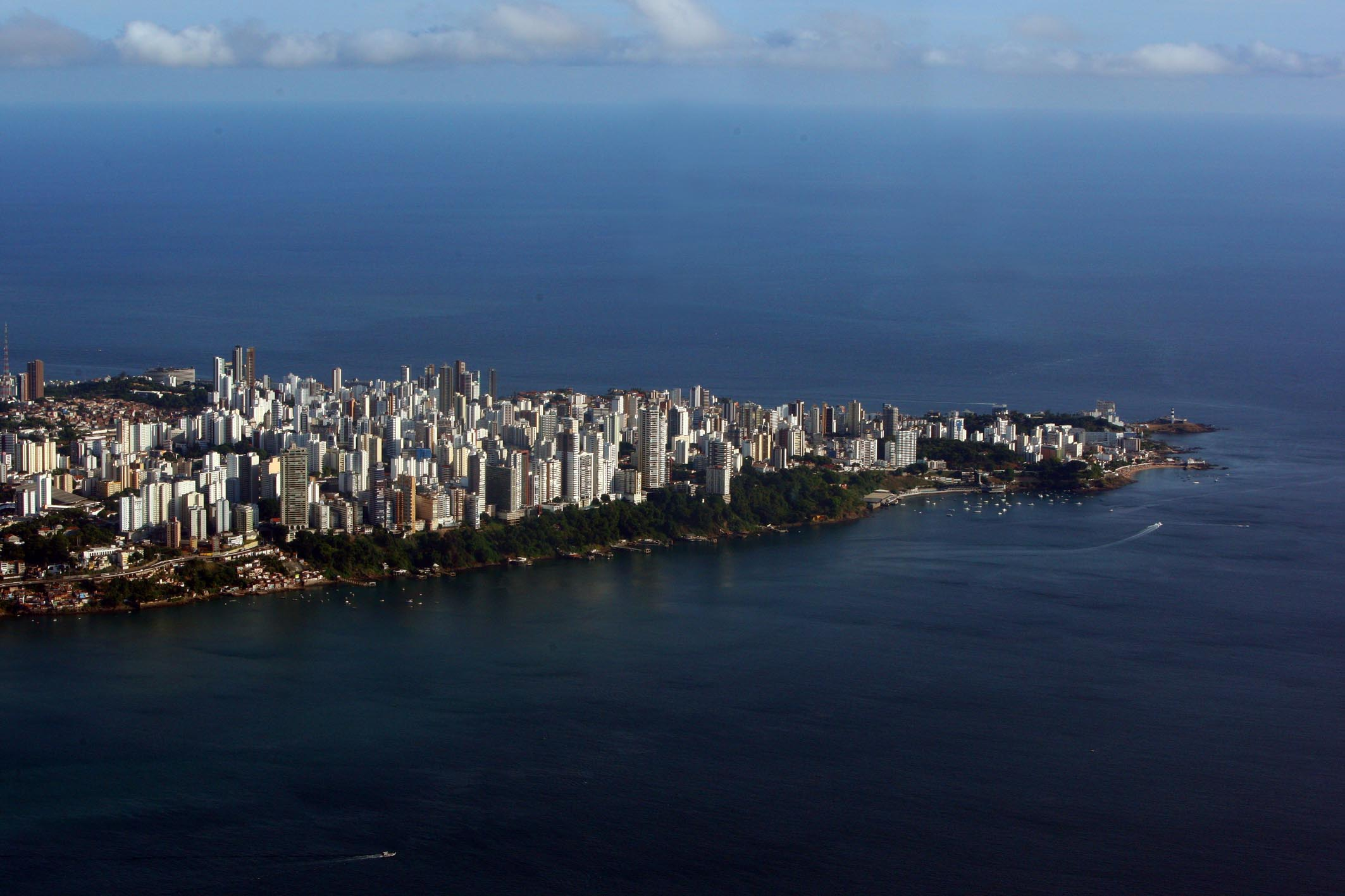
Aerial view of Salvador

Salvador is divided into a number of distinct neighborhoods, which can be categorized by which geographic zone they are located in; West, South or East. The most well known districts, including Pelourinho, Comércio, and Old Downtown, are all located in the West Zone. Barra, with its beaches and starting point to one of the city's Carnival circuits, is located in the South Zone. Vitória, a neighborhood with many high rise buildings, is located in South Zone. Campo Grande, with its Dois de Julho Square and the monument to Bahia's independence, is also located in the South Zone, as is Graça, an important residential area. Ondina, with Salvador's Zoobotanical Garden and the site where the Barra-Ondina Carnival circuit ends, the neighborhood is home of the Spanish Club, is also a neighborhood in the South Zone.

Itaigara, Pituba, Horto Florestal, Caminho das Árvores, Loteamento Aquárius, Brotas, Stiep, Costa Azul, Armação, Jaguaribe and Stella Maris are the wealthiest communities of the city and are located in the East Zone. Rio Vermelho, a neighborhood with a rich architectural history and numerous restaurants and bars, is located in the South Zone. Itapoã, known throughout Brazil as the home of Vinicius de Moraes and for being the setting of the song "Tarde em Itapoã", is located in the East Zone.

The Northwest area of the city along the Bay of All Saints, also known as Cidade Baixa ("Lower city"), contains the impoverished neighborhoods of Periperi, Paripe, Lobato, Liberdade, Nova Esperança, and Calçada. The neighborhood of Liberdade has one of the largest proportions of Afro-Brazilians of Salvador and Brazil.

=== Pelourinho ===
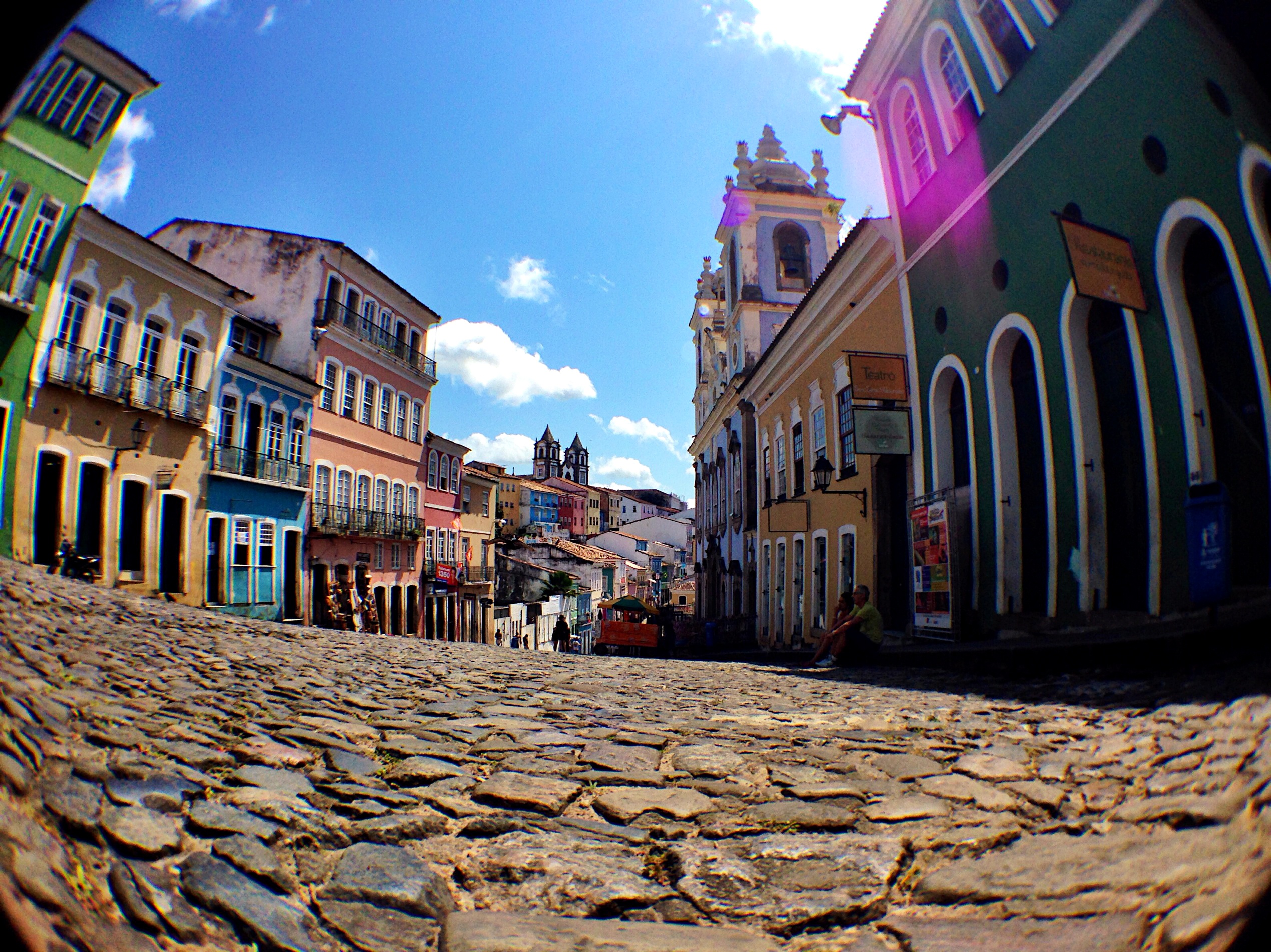
View of Largo do Pelourinho

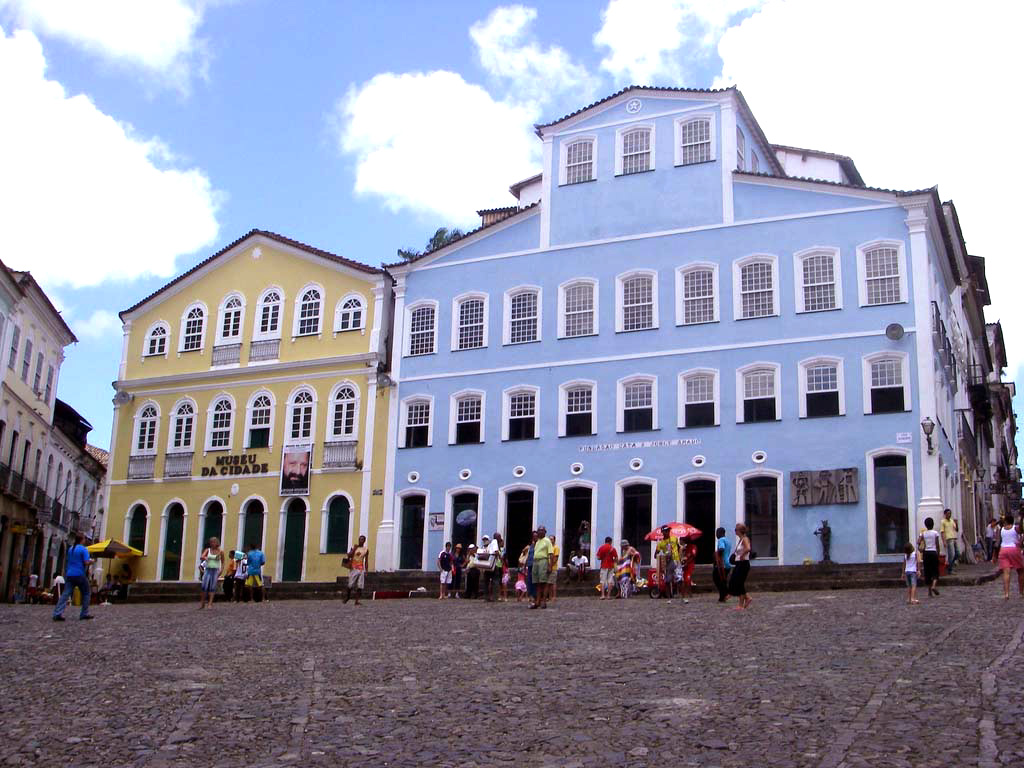
Old houses in the historical center of Salvador.

The Historic Center of Salvador was designated in 1985 a World Heritage Site by UNESCO. The city represents a fine example of Portuguese urbanism from the middle of the 16th century with its higher administrative town and its lower commercial town, and a large portion of the city has retained the old character of its streets and colourful houses.

As the first capital of Portuguese America, Salvador cultivated slave labor and had its pillories ("pelourinhos") installed in open places like the Terreiro de Jesus and the squares know today as Tomé de Sousa and Castro Alves. The pillories were a symbol of authority and justice for some and of lashings and injustice for the majority. The one erected for a short time in what is now the Historical Center, and later moved to what is now the Praça da Piedade (Square of Piety), ended up lending its name to the historical and architectural complex of Pelourinho, part of the city's upper town.

Since 1992, the Pelourinho neighborhood has been subject to a nearly US$100 million "restoration" that has led to the rebuilding of hundreds of buildings' façades and the expulsion of the vast majority of the neighborhood's Afro-descendent population. This process has given rise to substantial political debate in the State of Bahia, since the Pelourinho's former residents have been for the most part excluded from the renovation's economic benefits (reaped by a few). A major restoration effort resulted in making the area a tourist attraction.

Salvador's considerable wealth and status during colonial times (as capital of the colony during 250 years and which gave rise to the Pelourinho) is reflected in the magnificence of its colonial palaces, churches and convents, most of them dating from the 17th and 18th centuries. These include:

- Cathedral of Salvador: Former Jesuit church of the city, built in the second half of the 17th century. Fine example of Mannerist architecture and decoration.
- Convent and Church of São Francisco: Franciscan convent and church dating from the first half of the 18th century is another fine example of the Portuguese colonial architecture. The Baroque decoration of the church is among the finest in Brazil.
- Church of Nosso Senhor do Bonfim: Rococo church with Neoclassical inner decoration. The image of Nosso Senhor do Bonfim is the most venerated in the city, and the Feast of Our Lord of Good Ending (Festa de Nosso Senhor do Bonfim) in January is the most important in the city after Carnival.
- Mercado Modelo (Model Market): In 1861, at the Cayrú Square, the Customs Building was constructed, with a rotunda (large circular room with a domed ceiling) at the back end, where ships anchored to unload their merchandise.
- Lacerda Elevator (Elevador Lacerda): Inaugurated in 1873, this elevator was planned and built by the businessman Antônio Francisco de Lacerda, The four elevator cages connect the 72 metres (236 ft) between the Thomé de Souza Square in the upper city, and the Cayru Square in the lower city. In each run, which lasts for 22 seconds, the elevator transports 128 persons, 24 hours a day.

== Sports ==
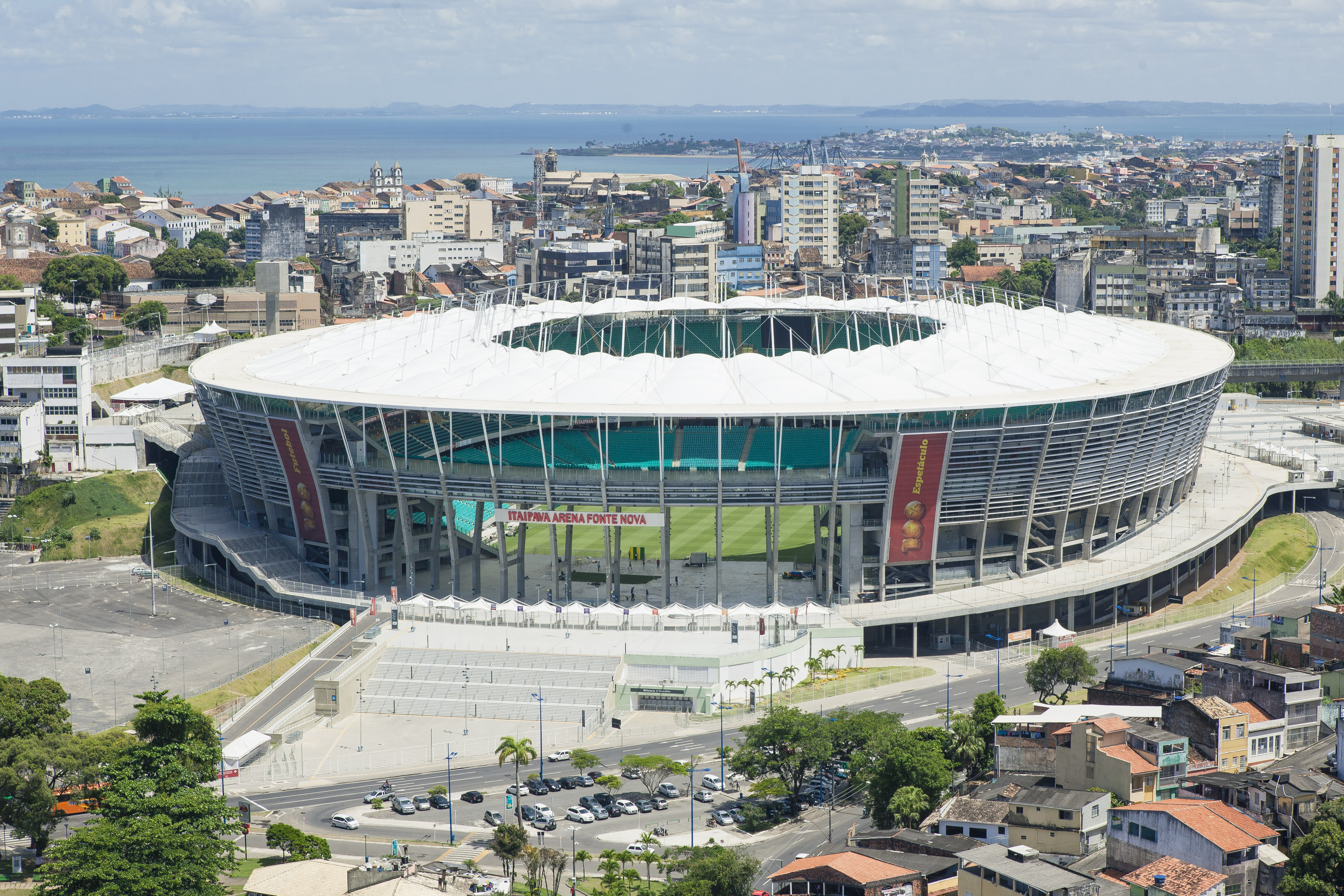
Fonte Nova Arena

Salvador domiciles practises various sporting activities. Salvador's main football teams are Esporte Clube Bahia and Esporte Clube Vitória. Bahia has won 2 national titles, the Taça Brasil in 1959 and the Brazilian League in 1988, while Vitória was a runner up in the Brazilian league in 1993 and the Copa do Brasil in 2010. Smaller teams include EC Ypiranga with 10 titles of the Campeonato Baiano, Botafogo SC with 7, Galícia EC with 5, and AD Leônico with 2. The Arena Fonte Nova, which replaced the older Estádio Fonte Nova after the later's 2007 closure, is the city's main football and events venue, and hosted matches of the 2013 FIFA Confederations Cup and the subsequent 2014 FIFA World Cup, as well as the football competition during the 2016 Summer Olympics. The stadium is owned by the Bahia government, and is the home ground of Esporte Clube Bahia. The stadium is known after the nickname Fonte Nova, because it is located at Ladeira das Fontes das Pedras street. Its formal name honors Otávio Mangabeira, a civil engineer, journalist, and former Bahia state governor from 1947 to 1954.

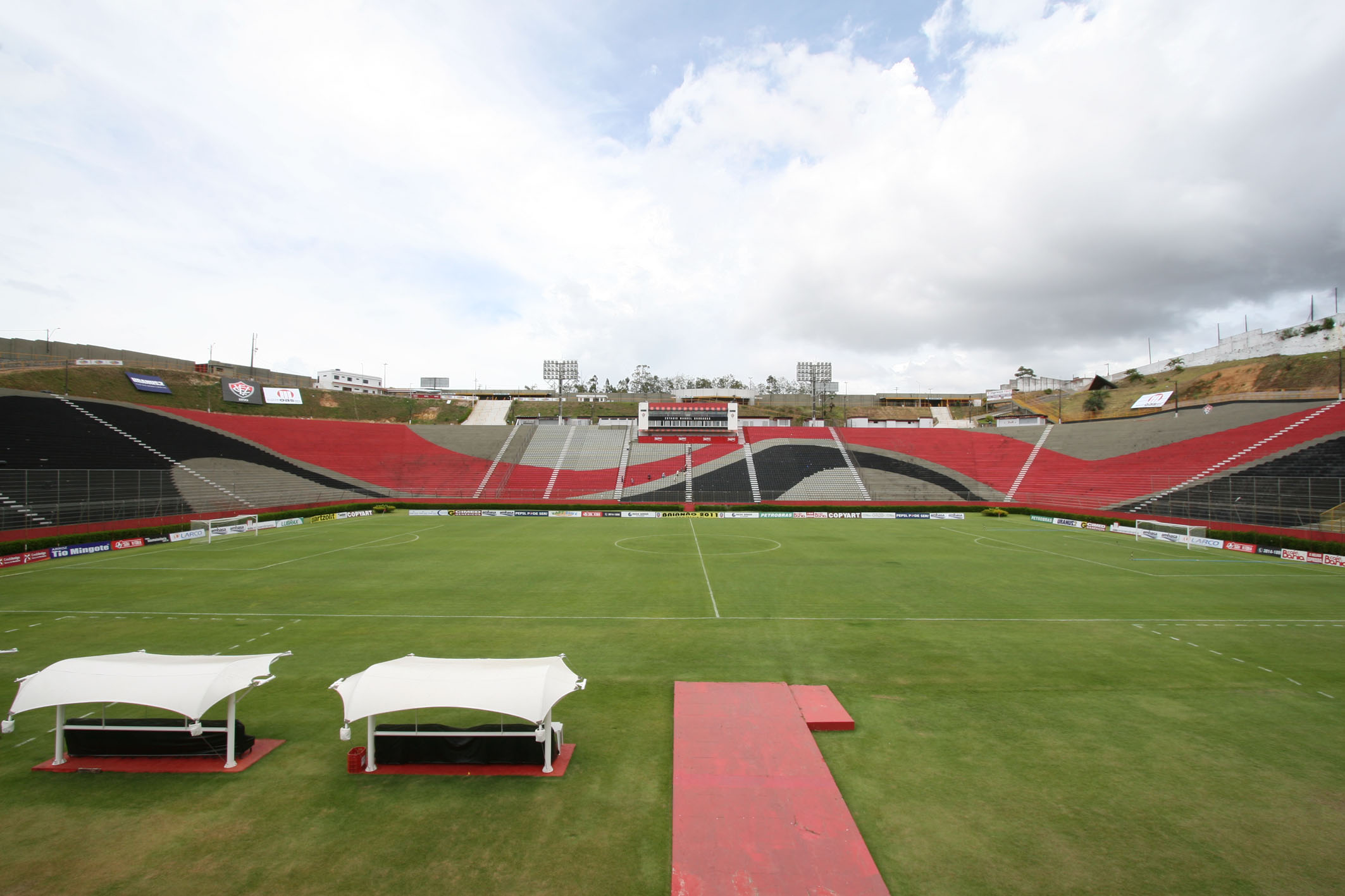
Manoel Barradas Stadium

During the last decades, volleyball has grown steadily in Salvador, especially after the gold medal won by Brazil in the 1992 Summer Olympics in Barcelona. The most important tournaments in Bahia are the State Championship, the State League tournament and the Primavera Games, and the main teams are Associação Atlética da Bahia, Bahiano de Tênis, and Clube the Regatas Itapagipe. There are also beach volleyball events. Salvador has housed many international tournaments. Federação Bahina de Voleibol (the state league) can inform the schedule of tournaments. Bowling is practiced both by teenagers and adults in Salvador. Boliche do Aeroclube and Space Bowling are equipped with automatic lanes as well as a complete bar infrastructure.

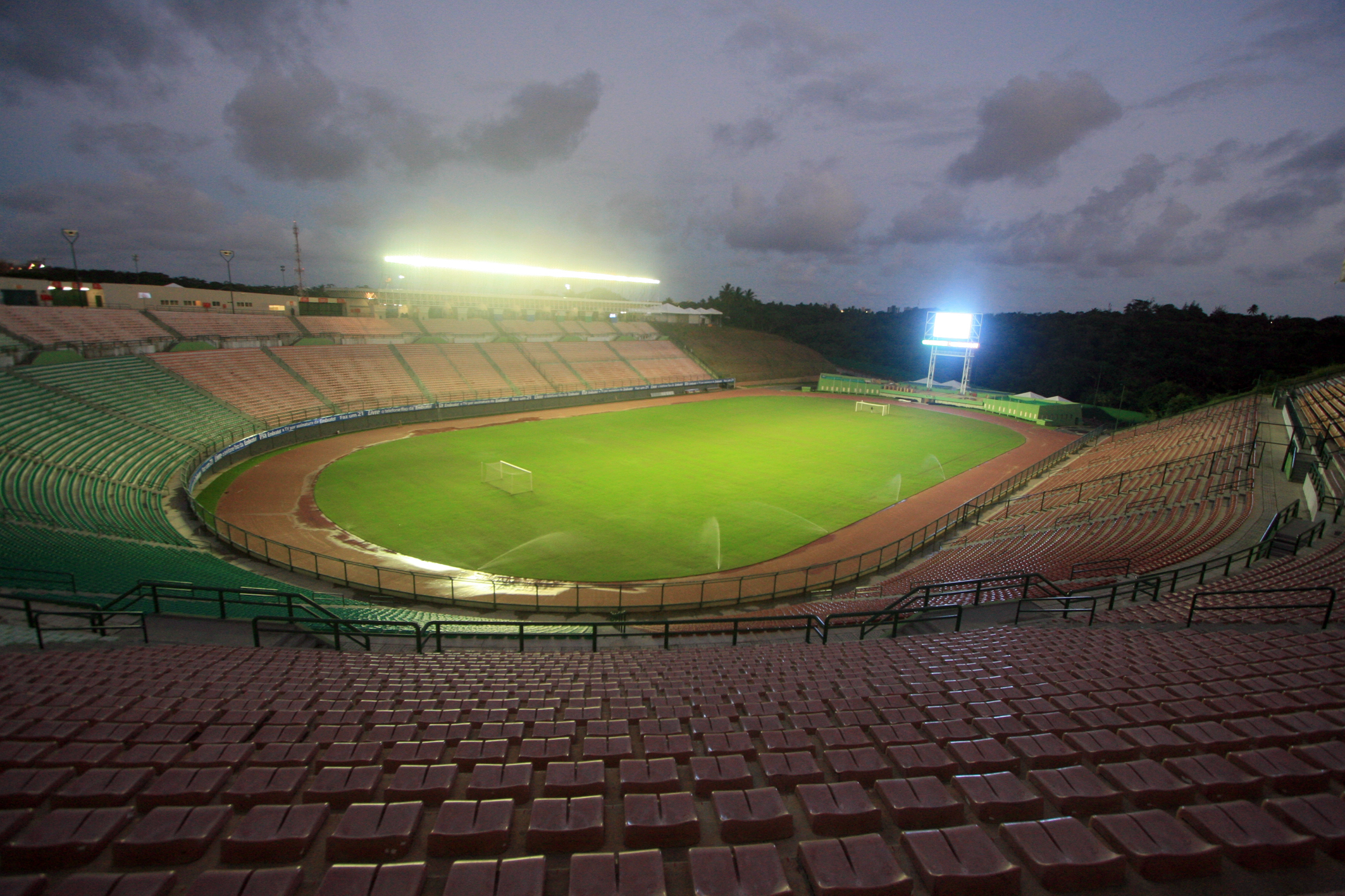
Pituaçu Stadium

Bahia's basketball league exists since 1993 and has 57 teams. The sport is very popular in the city of Salvador, especially among students. There are several courts scattered across the city, where is possible to play for free, like the one located at Bahia Sol square, where people play. There are also several gymnasiums, in clubs like Bahiano de Tênis and Associação Atlética and the Antonio Balbino Gymnasiums (popularly known as "Balbininho"), which is an arena that can hold up to 7,000 people.

Todos os Santos Bay and Salvador's climatic conditions are ideal for competition and recreational sailing. The city is equipped with good infrastructure for practice of sailing, such as rental and sale of dock space, boat maintenance, restaurants, snack bar, convenience stores, nautical products stores, boat rental agencies, VHF and SSB communication systems, events, and total assistance to crews. The large number of sailing events organized by clubs and syndicates, like oceanic races and typical boats (wooden fishing boats and canoes) races, demonstrates the sport's growing force. Currently, Salvador has a national racing schedule with dozens of events, also receiving the Mini Transat 6.50 and Les Illes du Soleil races.

Rowing boat races started in the city more than a hundred years ago. It was originally practiced by young men from traditional families, who spent their summer vacations there. The sport is a leisure option in Cidade Baixa (the lower part of the city). Esporte Clube Vitória and Clube São Salvador were the pioneers in the sport. Nowadays, these two entities and also Clube de Regatas Itapagipe lead the competitions that take place in the city. With the recent renovation of the Dique do Tororó area, Salvador received new lanes for the practice of the sport.

== Consular representations ==
The following countries have consular representations in Salvador da Bahia:

- Argentina (Consulate)
- Portugal (Consulate-General)
- Spain (Consulate-General)
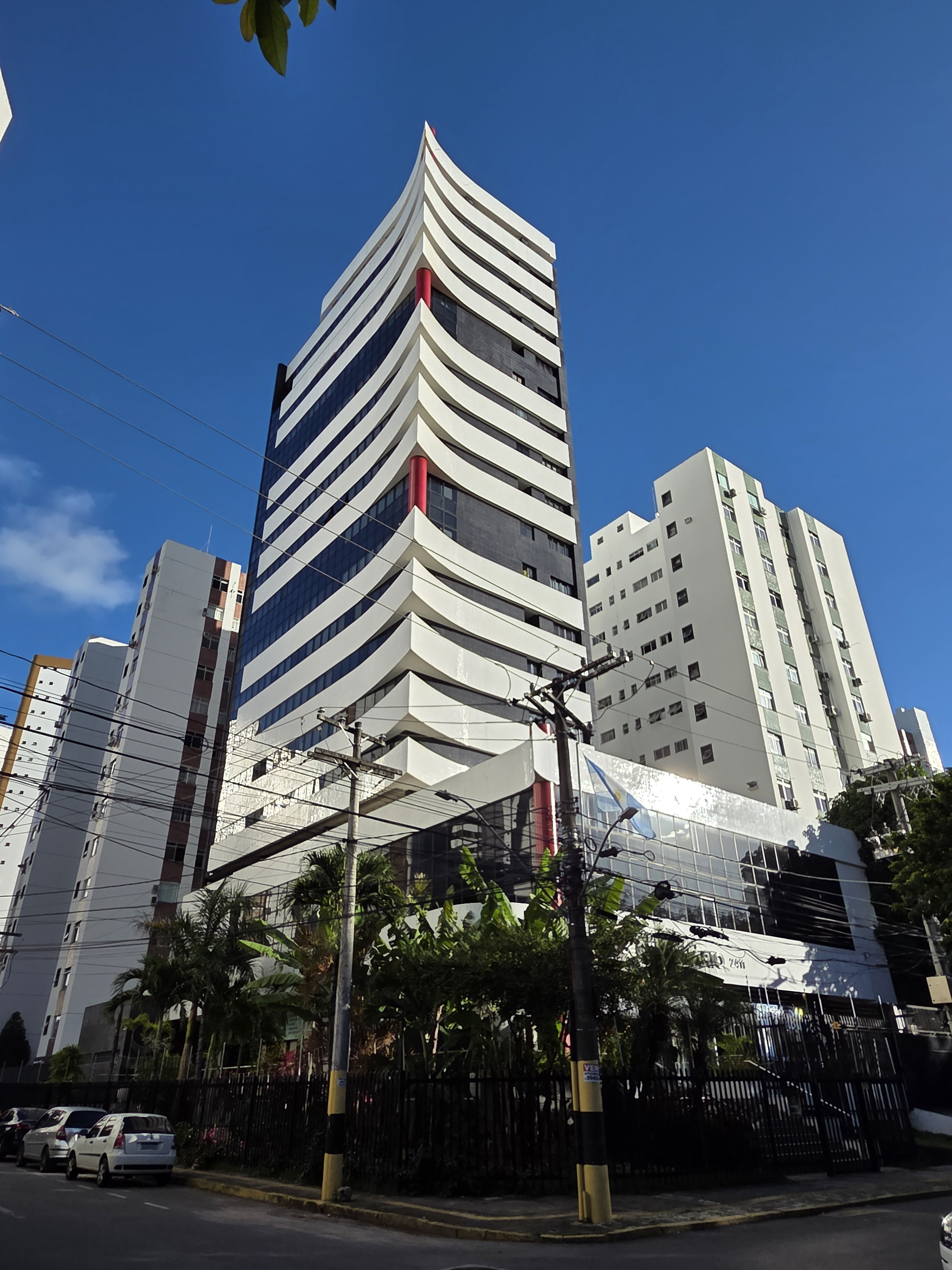
Building hosting the Consulate of Argentina

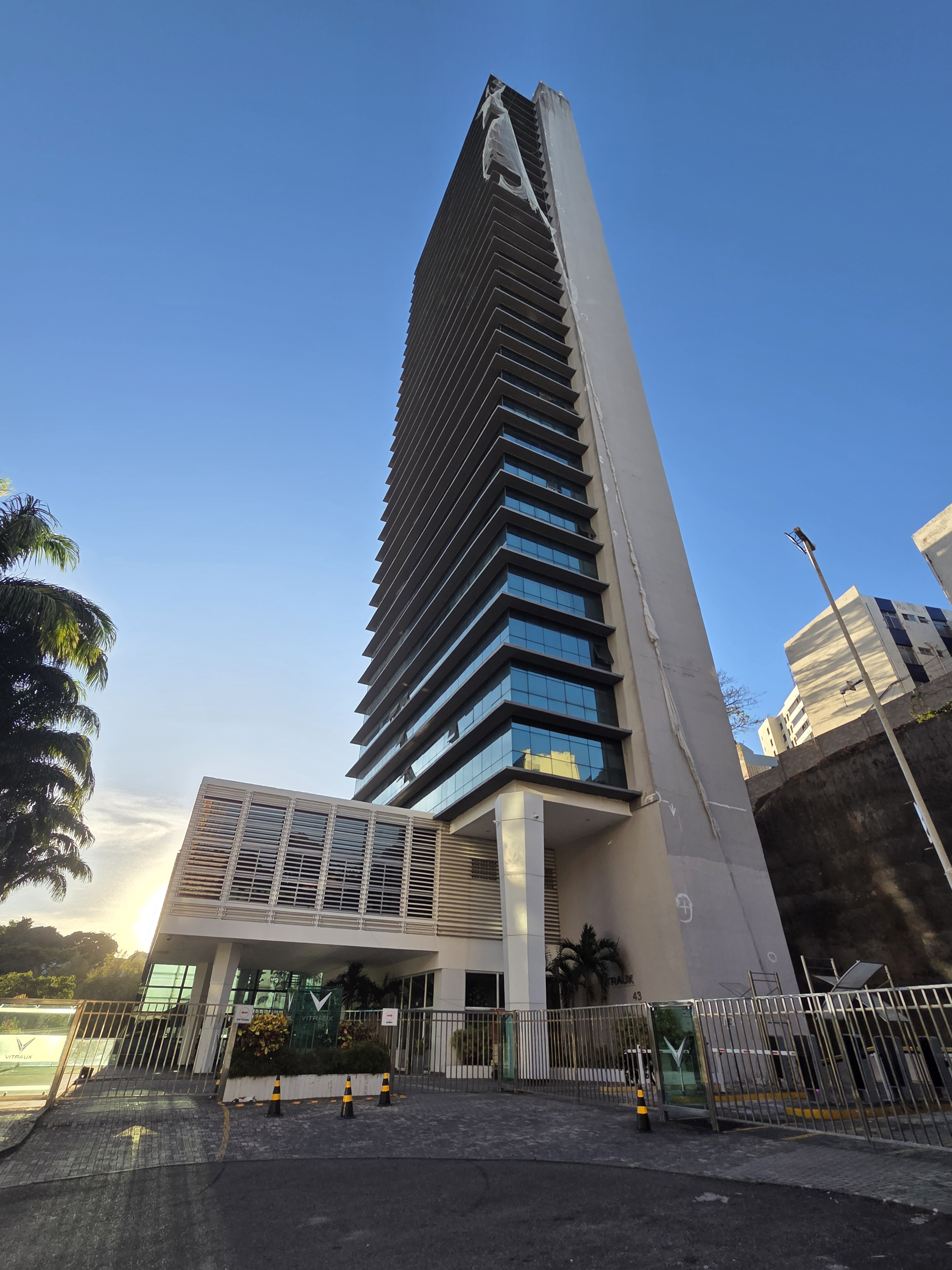
Building hosting the Consulate-General of Portugal

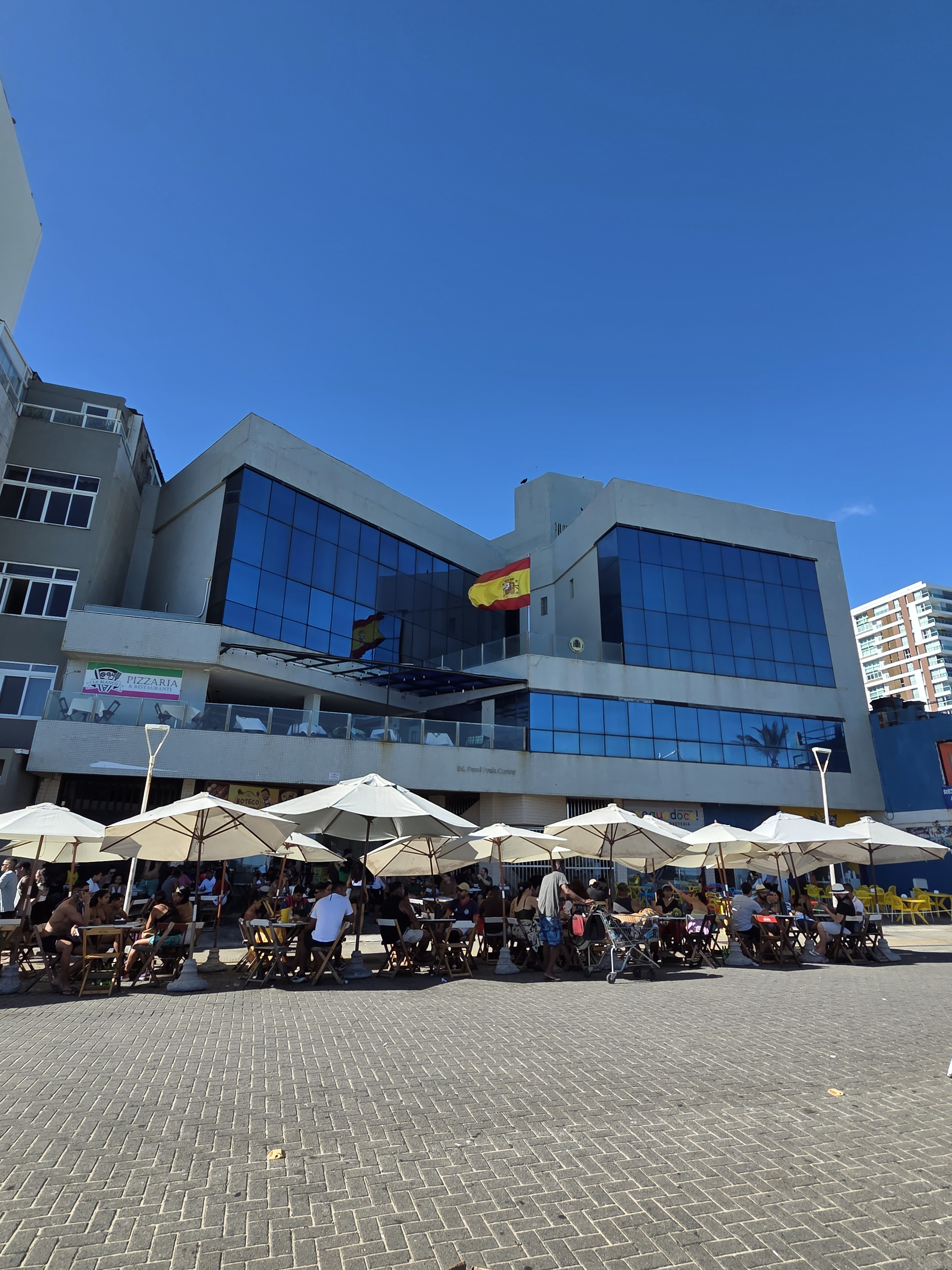
Building hosting the Consulate-General of Spain

== International relations ==
Salvador's twin towns and sister cities are:

Country	City	State / Region	Since
United States	Los Angeles	California	1962
Portugal	Lisbon	Lisboa Region	1985
Portugal	Angra do Heroísmo	Azores	1985
Portugal	Cascais	Lisbon Region	1985
Benin	Cotonou	Littoral Department	1987
Spain	Pontevedra	Galicia	1992
Cuba	Havana	La Havana	1993
Italy	Sciacca	Sicily	2001
China	Harbin	Heilongjiang	2003
United States	Miami	Florida	2006
China	(China) Chongqing	Government of China	2011
Brazil	Natal	Rio Grande do Norte	2011
Israel	Jerusalem	(Israel) Jerusalem	2019

== Notable people ==
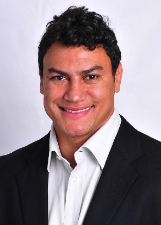
Popó, former professional boxer

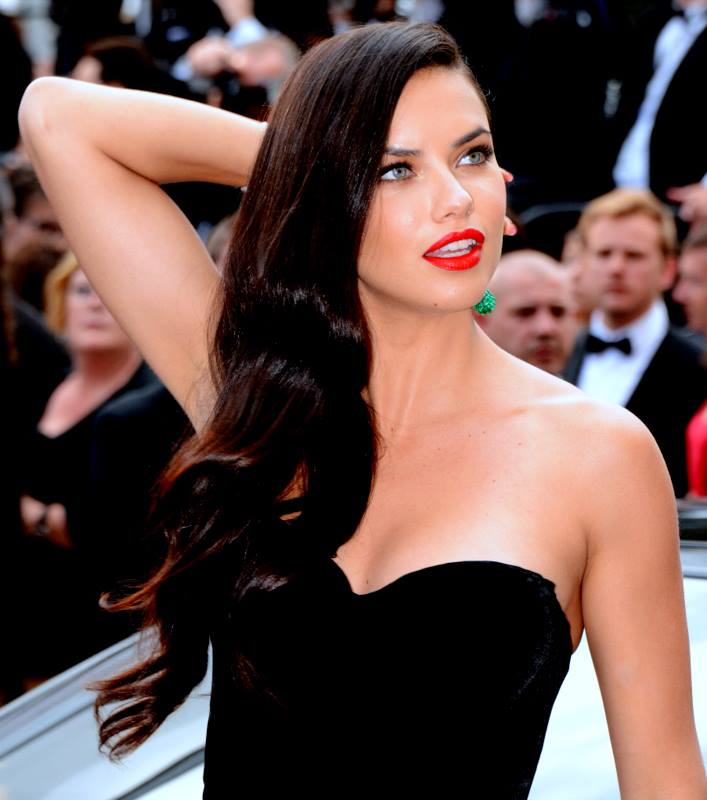
Adriana Lima, supermodel and longest-running Victoria's Secret Angel from 2000 to 2018

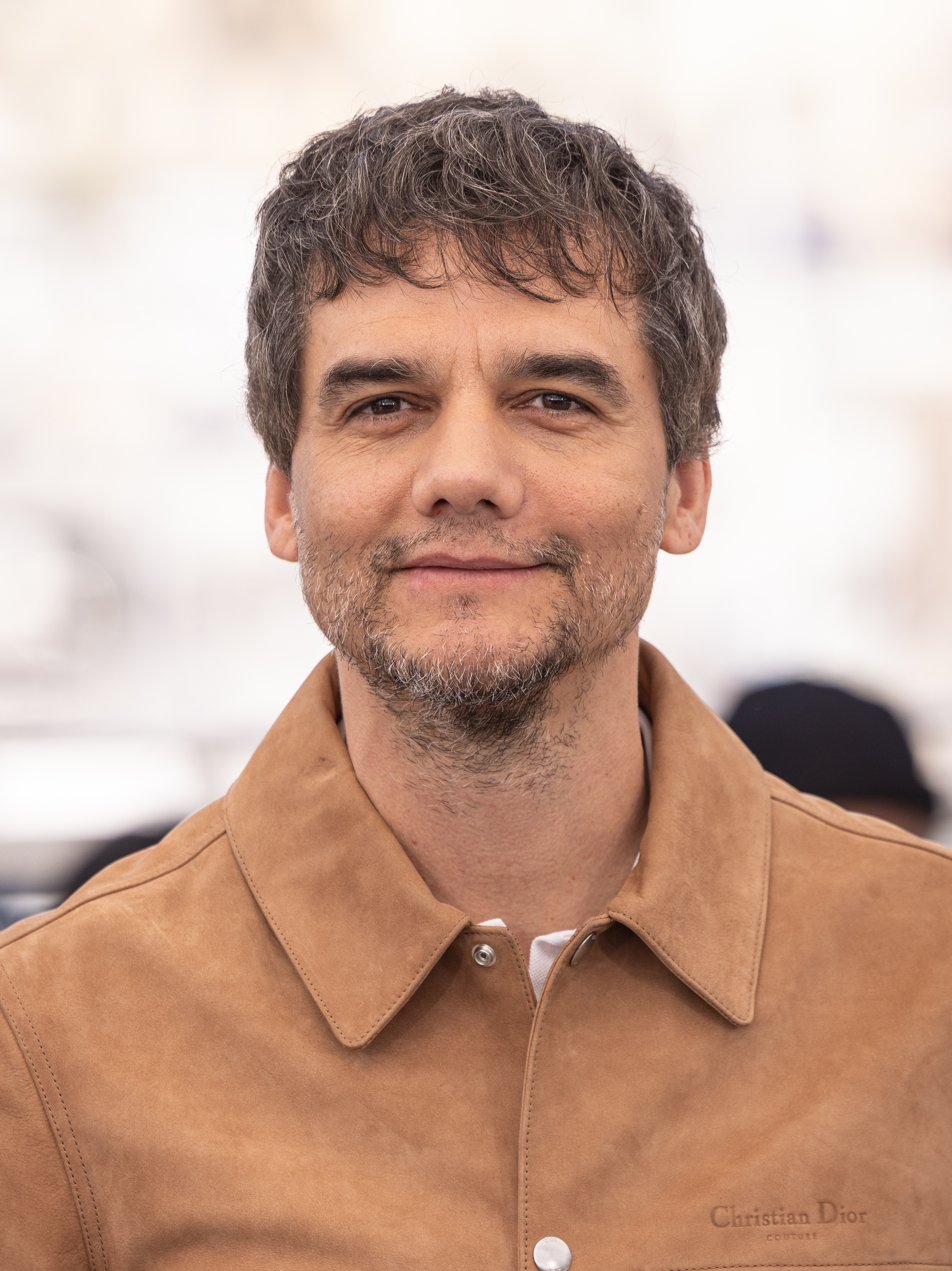
Wagner Moura, Golden Globe-winning actor

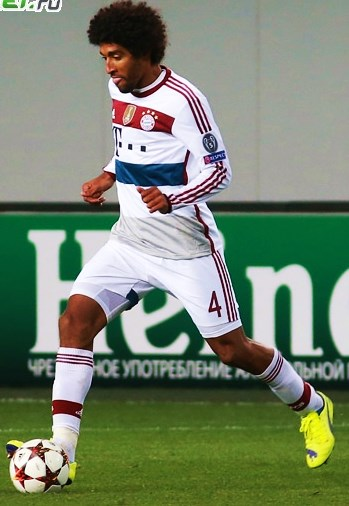
Dante, professional footballer

- Saint Dulce de Souza Lopes Pontes, religious sister
- Acelino Freitas, boxer, 4-times World Champion
- Robson Conceição, 2016 Olympic gold medalist boxer
- Hebert Conceição, 2021 Olympic gold medalist boxer
- Beatriz Ferreira, boxer, World Champion and Olympic runner-up
- Lyoto Machida, mixed martial artist
- Tony Kanaan, race car driver
- Breno Correia, swimmer, World Champion and former World Record Holder
- Edvaldo Valério, swimmer, Olympic medallist
- Allan do Carmo, swimmer specialized in open water marathon
- Ana Marcela Cunha, swimmer specialized in open water marathon
- Ricardo Santos, beach volleyball player, Olympic champion
- Israel, basketball player, Pan American champion and World Championship medallist
- Patricia Medrado, tennis player, former top-10 in doubles and top-50 in singles
- Bebeto, football forward, 1994 World Cup champion
- Dante, professional soccer player Champion UEFA Champions League
- Walace, football player
- Oséas, football player
- Keno, football player
- Marcelo Oliveira, football player
- Edcarlos, football player
- Guilherme Caribé, swimmer, Pan American Games champion
- Duda, footballer (Edmilton Conceição dos Santos)
- Marcelo Oliveira, football player
- Victor Colonese, swimmer specialized in open water marathon, Pan American Games medalist
- Hugo Viana mixed martial artist in UFC
- Edílson, football player
- Daniel Oliveira, rally driver
- Lateef Crowder dos Santos, Capoeira practitioner
- Robenílson de Jesus, boxer
- Manuel dos Reis Machado (Bimba), capoeira master
- Dias Gomes, playwright
- Ruy Barbosa de Oliveira, writer, jurist and politician
- Bruno Capinan, singer
- Carlinhos Brown, singer
- Dorival Caymmi, singer
- Nabiyah Be, actress and singer
- Gal Costa, singer
- Wagner Moura, actor
- Priscila Fantin, actress
- Adélia Josefina de Castro Fonseca, writer
- Óscar Freire, physician and professor
- Adriana Lima, supermodel
- Antônio Carlos Magalhães, politician
- Gregório de Matos, poet
- Daniela Mercury, musician
- Pitty, musician
- Rogério da Silva Rego, lawyer, public servant and politician
- Raul Seixas, musician
- Martha Vasconcellos, Miss Bahia 1968, Miss Brazil 1968 and Miss Universe 1968
- Hildegardes Vianna, journalist and folklorist

== See also ==
- Anglican Chapel of Salvador
- São Marcelo Fort

== Notes ==
First	Capital of Brazil; 1645–1763	Succeeded by Rio de Janeiro
