= Fead =

Fead is a surname. Notable people with the surname include:

- Beverlye Hyman Fead (born 1934), American artist
- George Fead (1729?–1815), British military officer
- Louis H. Fead (1877–1943), American jurist
- William Frederick Fead (1809-1853), British naval officer

== See also ==
- Fund for European Aid to the Most Deprived (FEAD)
- John L. Fead House, historic place in Lexington, Michigan
