= Anglican Chapel of Salvador =

Demolished Anglican church in Salvador, Brazil

Coordinates: 12°59′23″S 38°31′20″W

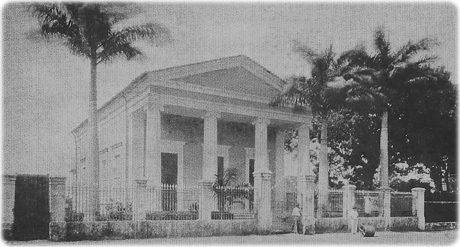
The Anglican Chapel of Salvador in a picture taken by Wilhelm Gaensly (1843–1928), circa 1870.

The Anglican Chapel of Salvador was an Anglican church located in Salvador, capital of the Brazilian state of Bahia. First subject to the Church of England and then to the Anglican Episcopal Church of Brazil, the chapel was demolished in 1975 to make room for the Britânia Mansion residential building.

== History ==
Anglicanism first arrived in Brazil in the early 19th century in the context of the transfer of the Portuguese court to Brazil. In 1810 Portugal and the United Kingdom signed the Treaty of Commerce and Navigation, which permitted the construction of Anglican chapels in Brazil, as long as they did not resemble religious temples and did not seek the conversion of Brazilians. That same year, the first Anglican services in the country took place – in English and aimed exclusively at foreigners. The Anglican chaplaincy of Salvador was established in 1815 and its services were initially held in private residences.

In 1811 Marcos de Noronha e Brito, then Governor of Bahia, authorized the construction of the British Cemetery in the Barra slope. An Anglican chapel – known as Saint George's Church or British Church – was inaugurated there for the burial ceremonies of Anglo-Brazilians and people from other nationalities. After Independence, then chaplain Edward Parker bought a piece of land near Campo Grande square for the construction of a church for the Anglican community of Salvador. The Anglican Chapel was opened in October 1853 by the Saint George Society. As in Rio de Janeiro, the local British community referred to the chapel as Christ Church. At the same time, the local government was finishing its urbanization works in Campo Grande square, which would be used by the British for their cricket matches.

The Anglican Chapel of Salvador was modelled after Classical architecture and was the second largest non-Roman Catholic church built in Brazil. During the Empire, Catholicism remained the state religion of the country and non-Catholic churches were still forbidden to resemble churches, with towers and bells. It was only after the Proclamation of the Republic – when Brazil was transformed into a secular state – that this obligation ceased to exist and Anglicans could finally hold their services in Portuguese and seek to convert Brazilians. That prompted the Episcopal Church to create the missionary district of Brazil, which would create the Anglican Episcopal Church of Brazil after the merger of the British chaplaincies and the American missions in the mid-20th century.

In 1975, with the increase of real estate speculation in the area surrounding Campo Grande square, a construction company negotiated with the Saint George Society to exchange the site of the chapel for the construction of a new church in Pituba. As a result, the chapel was demolished that year, making room for the Britânia Mansion apartment building. The following year, the Saint George Society was no longer responsible for organizing the Anglican church in Salvador; that prerogative was given to the Anglican Parish of the Good Shepherd. In 2010 the parish transferred its headquarters to a new building in the Bonfim district, while keeping its church in Pituba. That same year, the parish was legally separated from the Saint George Society, which became a non-profit organization with no direct links to the Anglican Episcopal Church of Brazil, responsible only for the maintenance of the British Cemetery of Bahia.
