= British Cemetery of Bahia =

British Cemetery
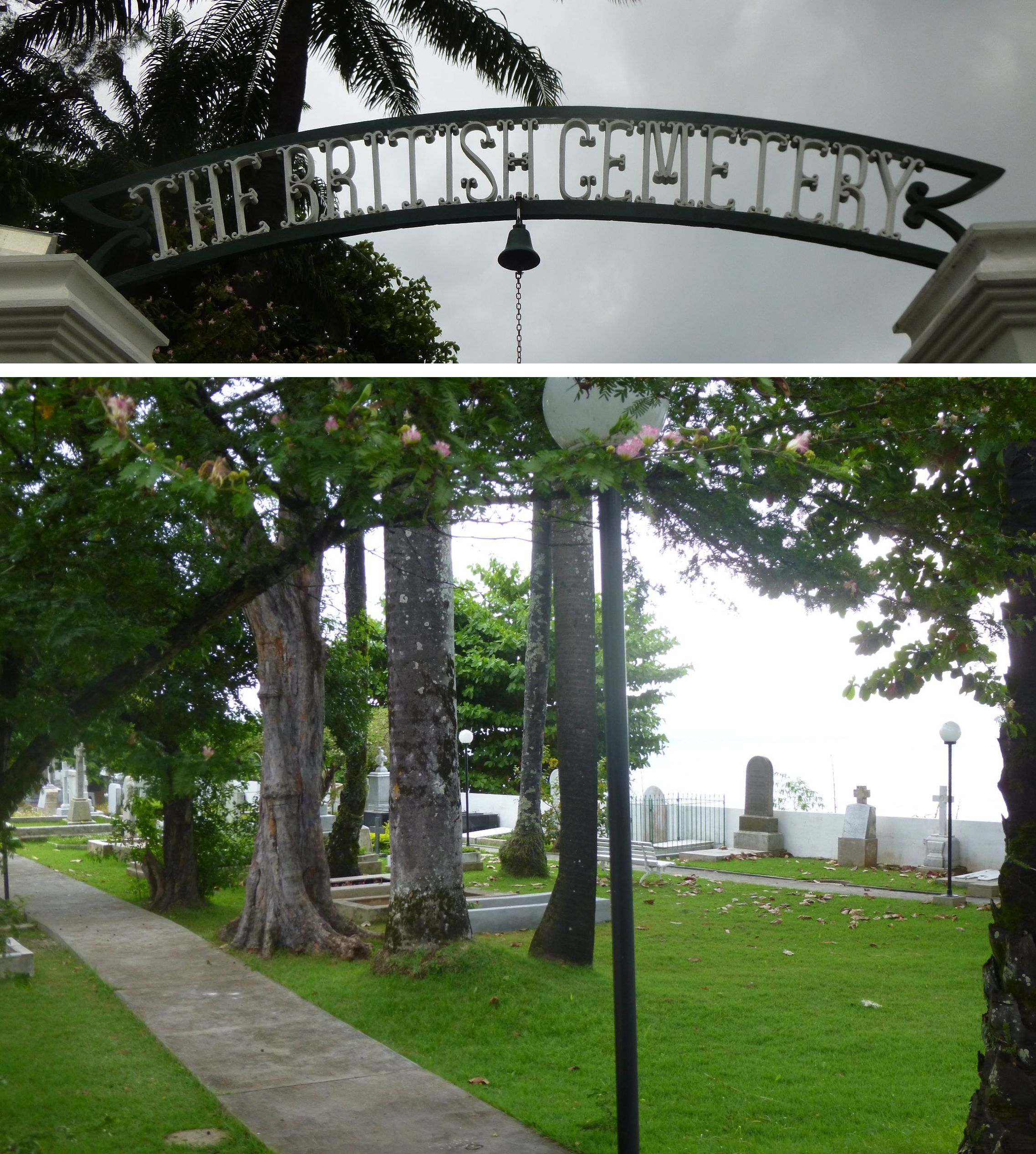
- Cemetery entrance
- Interactive map of British Cemetery

Details
- Established: 1814
- Location: Salvador
- Country: Brazil
- Coordinates: 13.000397°S 38.530813°W
- Type: Public

The British Cemetery of Bahia (Portuguese: Cemitério dos Ingleses da Bahia) is a burial ground located in Salvador, the capital and largest city in the Brazilian state of Bahia. Its history dates back to the Navigation and Trade Treaty, also known as the Strangford Treaty, signed by the Kingdom of Portugal and the United Kingdom of Great Britain and Ireland in 1810. The treaty permitted the establishment of churches of the Church of England in Brazil, then a colony of Portugal. Built in 1814 and located in Avenida Sete de Setembro, more specifically Ladeira da Barra, it is the principal heritage site of the British community in Bahia. The British Cemetery was declared a state heritage site by the Institute of Artistic and Cultural Heritage of Bahia (IPAC) in 1993.

== History ==
Anglicanism first arrived in Brazil in the early 19th century, when the Portuguese royal family fled there in 1808. The Royal Navy escorted the Portuguese vessels that sailed from Lisbon on 27 November 1807 after Napoleon invaded Portugal. Therefore, a number of British citizens landed in the country. Some of them decided to stay and open businesses after the Navigation and Trade Treaty was signed in 1810; it guaranteed lower tariffs for British products brought to Brazil. The British had a competitive advantage that led them to dominate the Brazilian market and form significant communities in port cities such as Salvador, Recife and Rio de Janeiro.

The Navigation and Trade Treaty also permitted the construction of Anglican churches in Brazil. However, they had to be built with a different structure from Catholic churches – meaning that they could not have towers or bells – and were forbidden to preach to locals. According to the legend, the treaty was signed by John VI of Portugal on the site where the cemetery was later built. The first burial in the British Cemetery occurred in 1813. The construction of the British Cemetery preceded that of Campo Santo Cemetery, the first public cemetery in Salvador. Before that, Bahians were buried in churches, with the exception of "heretics", that is, non-Catholics. They were forbidden to be interred alongside Catholics according to the Constitution of Bahia.

The Navigation and Trade Treaty changed that situation for the British people living in Brazil; they were the main commercial partners of Portugal and, yet, were having difficulty in practicing their Protestant faith in a country where the state religion was Catholicism. After the treaty was signed, the first Anglican services in Brazil were held in 1810 – in English and exclusively for members of the British community – initially in private residences. In spite of their newly gained religious freedom, the British still lacked a place to worship and bury their dead.

=== Construction and opening ===
On 8 February 1811, then-Governor of Bahia Marcos de Noronha e Brito authorized the construction of a cemetery in the capital of Bahia for the burial rites of members of the British community. An Anglican chapel was soon built on the location; its first records date back to 1819. Until the inauguration of the Anglican Chapel of Salvador in October 1853, this chapel – known as Saint George's Church – was the only non-Catholic house of worship in the city. In Saint George's Church, the local Anglican community met and organized their practices. After the Anglican Chapel of Salvador was built, Saint George's stopped celebrating regular services and was only used for funerals.

The British Cemetery was built in an area owned by the Roman Catholic Archdiocese of São Salvador da Bahia, more specifically to the nearby Church of Santo Antônio da Barra. Such was the influence of the British in Bahia back then that in 1814 Noronha e Brito expropriated the land from the Catholic Church and donated it to the British community, which founded the Saint George's Society to organize its activities. It is believed that the Church of Santo Antônio da Barra and the British Cemetery were connected by a portal until the mid-nineteenth century, which would have been proof of a peaceful relationship between Catholics and Anglicans in Salvador. The Methodist missionary Daniel Parish Kidder described the white walls of British Cemetery among other structures visible from the entrance of the Bay of All Saints in 1839.

According to researcher Francisco de Paula Santana de Jesus, the relationship between Bahians and German Protestants was much more hostile. Until the inauguration of the German Cemetery in 1851, they were also buried in the British Cemetery due to the prohibition of interring non-Catholics in public cemeteries.

== Protected status ==
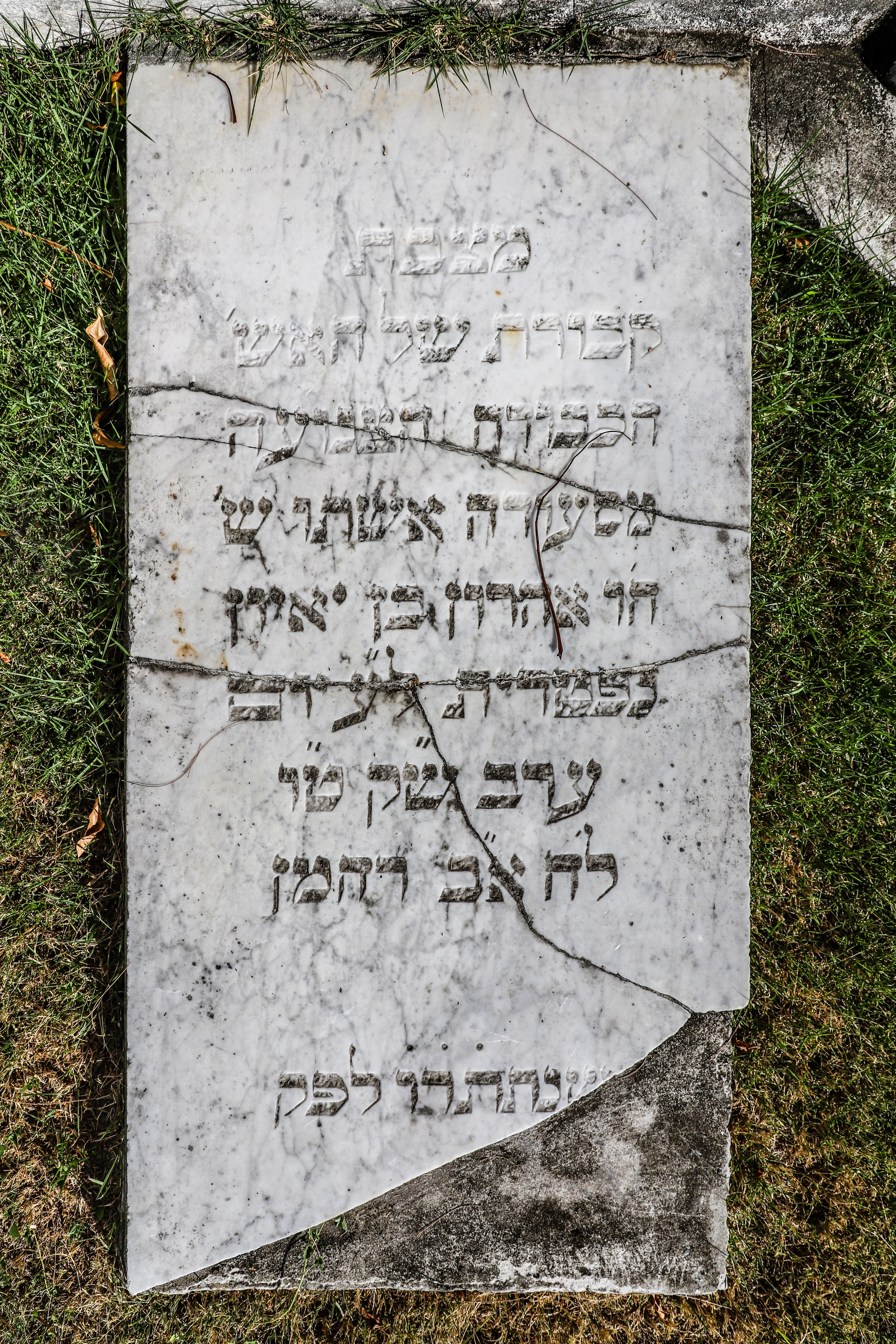
Tombstone in Hebrew, British Cemetery of Bahia

The British Cemetery was classified a state landmark by the Institute of Artistic and Cultural Heritage of Bahia in 1993, being registered that same year. After the British scholar, Sabrina Gledhill, initiated the restoration process with the support of Maria Clara Mariani, the site was restored in 2006 with funding from the State of Bahia and the Clemente Mariani Foundation (Fundação Clemente Mariani). Since then, the Saint George's Society has been trying to have it listed by the National Institute of Historic and Artistic Heritage.

In 2008, the Saint George's Society, in a case heard by the Supreme Federal Court, was exempted from paying R$41,831 in property tax to the city of Salvador. According to the unanimous decision of the judges, non-profit cemeteries are exempt from taxes. In 2009, the British Cemetery hosted the opening of the Darwin in Bahia exposition. It marked the bicentenary of Charles Darwin, who visited Salvador during his Beagle expedition. Two of his travel companions are buried on the cemetery. In 2009, the Anglican Parish of the Good Shepherd legally separated from the Saint George Society, who has since administered the British Cemetery as a non-profit organization.

On 6 July 2026, the Bahia branch of the Brazil-Japan Cultural Association (ACBJ-Ba) and the Saint George's Society unveiled a plaque in honour of Maeda Jurozaemon. The ceremony included talks by Sabrina Gledhill, Luiz Kobayashi, the author of Peregrinos do sol: A arte da espada samurai,and Fábio Costa, writer of the graphic novel Rocha navegável, inspired by Gledhill's research into Maeda's story.

== Burials ==
The first person interred in the British cemetery was John Sharp, a British slave trader born in Liverpool; he was buried in 1813. Some notable people were also buried in the British Cemetery, such as:

- Dr. John Ligertwood Paterson, an epidemiologist and founder of the Bahian Tropicalista School of Medicine
- Edward Pellew Wilson, trader and founder of Wilson, Sons
- Jones and Charles Musters, travelling companions of Charles Darwin on the Beagle expedition
- William Frederick Fead, a Royal Navy commander who was involved in the Prometheus Incident shortly before his death.
- Maeda Jurozaemon, a Japanese officer who performed seppuku aboard the flagship of the Flying Squadron in 1870. The location of his grave is unknown.

Some British and American consuls were also buried in the cemetery, along with members of the local Jewish community.

== Bibliographical sources ==
- Carvalho, Ernesto Regino Xavier de (2004). Uma necrópole renascida – A história do Cemitério dos Ingleses na Bahia. Salvador: PPG-AU FAUFBA. 194 pp.
- Guenther, Louise (2004). British Merchants in Nineteenth-Century Brazil: Business, Culture, and Identity in Bahia, 1808–50. New York: Oxford University Press. 211 pp. ISBN 978-0954407032.
- Peard, Julyan G. (2000). Race, Place, and Medicine: The Idea of the Tropics in Nineteenth-Century Brazilian Medicine. Durham, North Carolina: Duke University Press. 328 pp. ISBN 978-0822323976.
