= Maeda Jurozaemon =

Japanese samurai and lieutenant (1849–1870)

- 前田 十郎左衛門
- Born: 1849; Kagoshima, Japan
- Died: 7 October 1870 (aged 20–21); Salvador, Bahia, Brazil
- Relatives: Maeda Shinnosuke (father), Fudeko (mother)
- Military career
- Allegiance: Empire of Japan
- Branch: Imperial Japanese Navy
- Rank: Lieutenant

Maeda Jurozaemon (Japanese: 前田 十郎左衛門, Kagoshima, Japan, 1849 – Bahia, Brazil, 1870) was a samurai and lieutenant in the Japanese Navy who was sent by his daimyo, Prince Shimazu Hisamitsu, to learn English and study British naval techniques aboard the second formation of the Flying Squadron. Lt. Maeda performed seppuku aboard the flagship HMS Liverpool and was buried in the British Cemetery of Bahia. He was one of the first Japanese naval officers to study overseas, and is described in Japanese-language sources as the first Japanese national known to have been buried on Brazilian soil.

== Biography ==
Maeda Jurozaemon was born in 1849 in Kagoshima, the son of Maeda Shinnosuke, a samurai, and Fudeko. On 8 June 1869 he entered Keio University, later studying at Kaiseijo and then at the Naval Training School.

Following the Meiji Restoration in 1868, Emperor Meiji decreed that the Royal Navy would serve as the model for developing Japan's own naval forces. When the second formation of the Flying Squadron stopped at Edo and Yokohama in 1870, Maeda and Itsuki Ichiro were sent with it to England to learn naval techniques that would modernize the Japanese Navy.

In April 1870, Maeda and Ichiro Itsuki were sent to join the Flying Squadron as students. They were introduced to Rear-Admiral Geoffrey Hornby at the Summer Palace on 14 April. Originally, both Maeda and Ichiro Itsuki were assigned to the HMS Phoebe, but after leaving Vancouver Island (Esquimalt), Maeda was transferred to the HMS Liverpool.

At around 4 AM on 7 October 1870, having been seen sharpening his short sword while under suicide watch, Maeda grabbed the sword that was lying on his portmanteau in the wardroom of the Liverpool and performed seppuku. It was believed that he was despondent because he was failing in his mission to learn the English language and British naval techniques. Maeda was buried later that day in the "Jewish" section of the British Cemetery with naval honours and Anglican rites conducted by the Rev. Caley, the chaplain of the Anglican Chapel of Salvador, Bahia.

An academic study of the case was later published in the Japanese-language journal Studies in the History of English Learning.

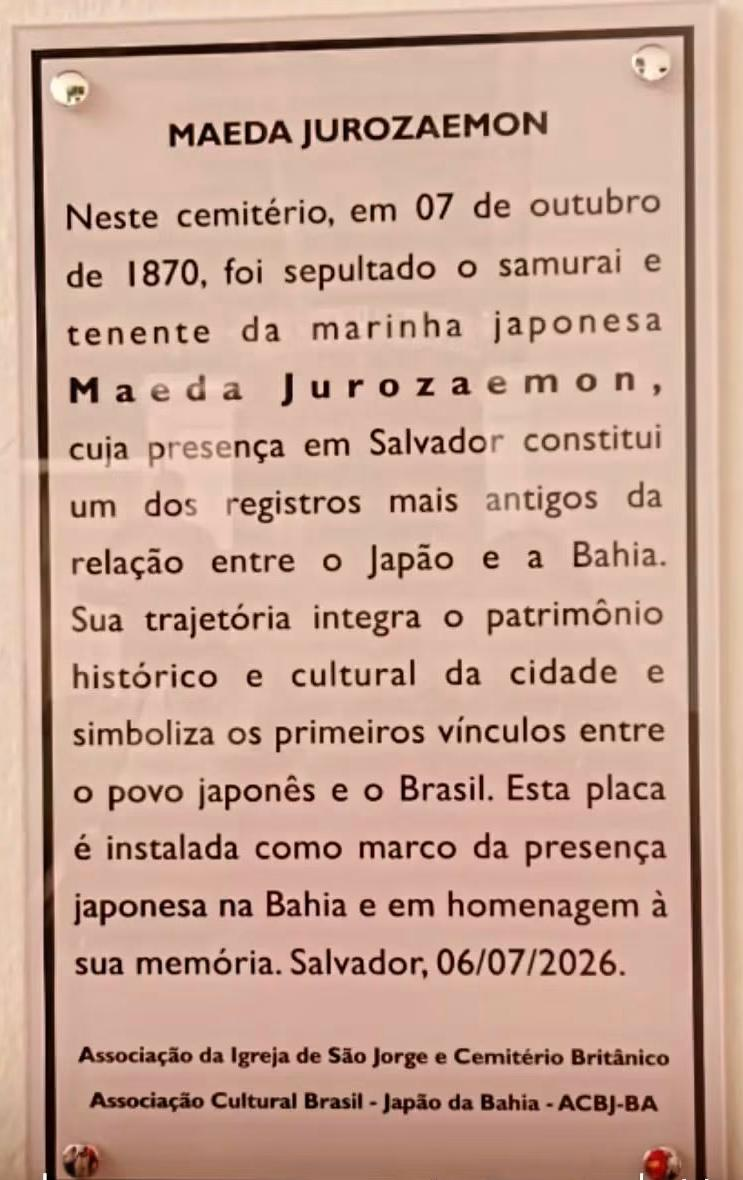
Plaque unveiled at the British Cemetery on 6 July 2026

== Tributes ==
There were later plans to send a tombstone from Japan, but when the cruiser ''Ikoma'' visited the site in 1910, Maeda's grave could not be located because it was believed at the time that he had been buried in a Jewish cemetery. In 1922, a training squadron including the ''Asama'', ''Iwate'', and ''Izumo'' revisited Bahia, but the grave was again not found.

Maeda's burial is recorded in the archives of the British Cemetery of Bahia under the name "Hyeen" (Japanese student), and his age was given as 22. However, his grave has since disappeared. On 6 July 2026, the Bahia branch of the Brazil-Japan Cultural Association and the Church of St. George and British Cemetery Association unveiled a plaque in his honour.

The story of the samurai's death and the disappearance of his grave, as recounted in an article by the British scholar Sabrina Gledhill, inspired the Brazilian graphic novel Rocha navegável ("Navigable Rock"), written by Fábio Costa and illustrated by Igor Souza (2020), which was nominated for a Jabuti Prize, and has itself been the subject of academic discussion.

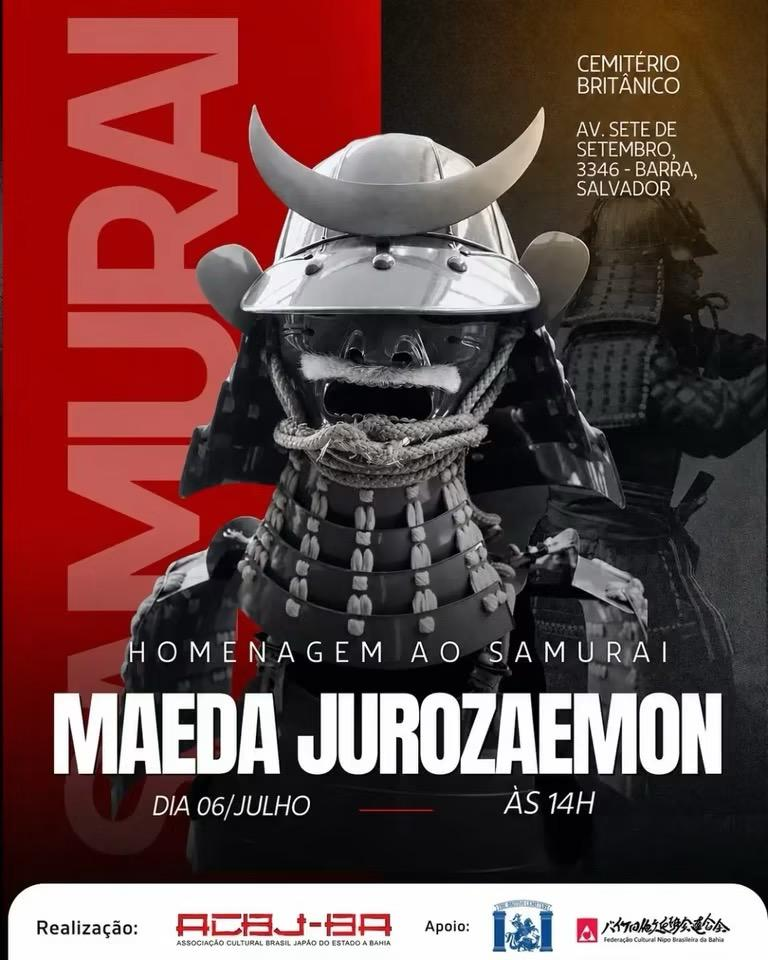
Poster for the Ceremony in Honour of Lt. Maeda

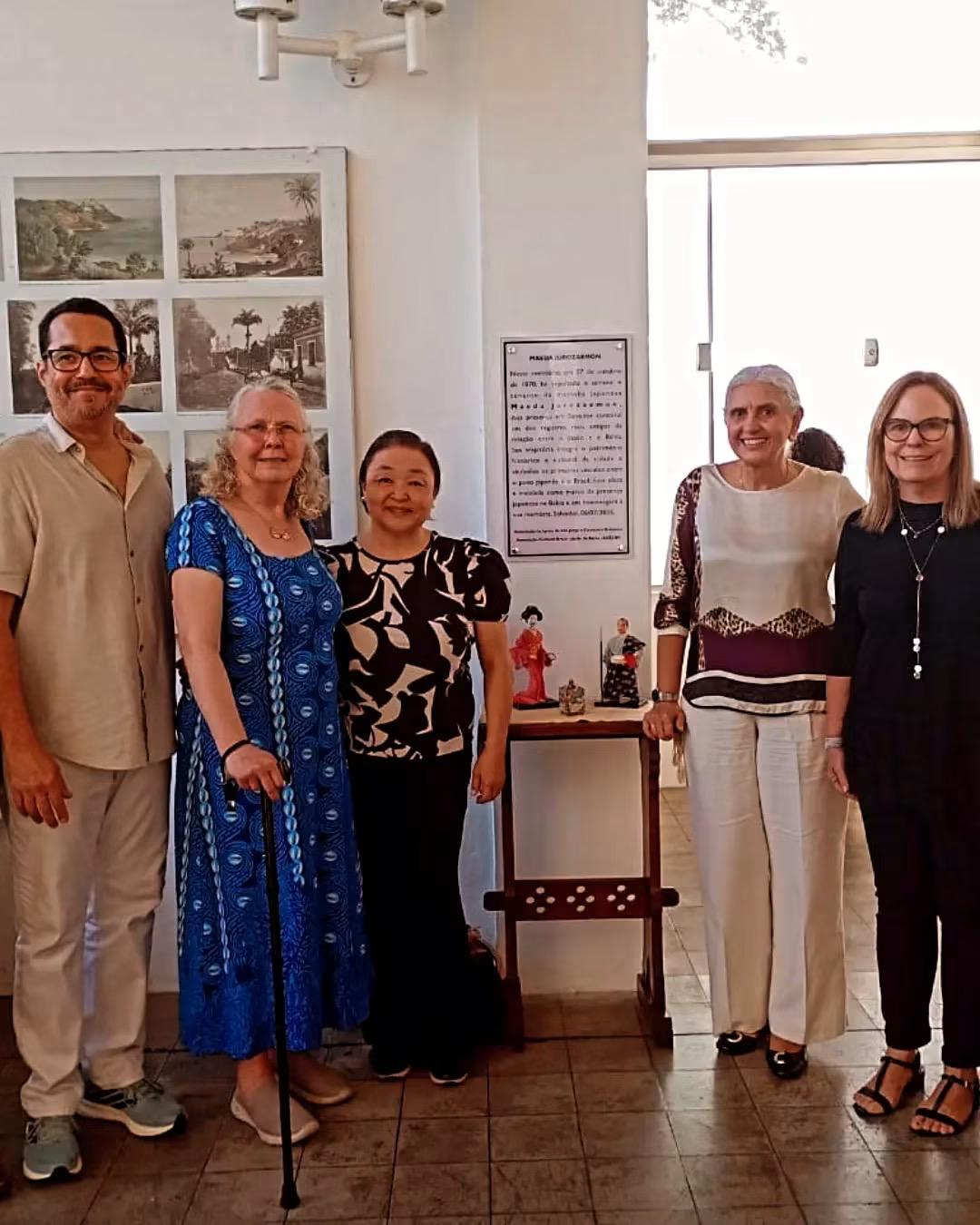
Fábio Costa, Sabrina Gledhill, Lika Kawano, Angela Ornelas, and Georgina Skelton

== Bibliography ==
- Cobbing, Andrew. The Japanese Discovery of Victorian Britain: Early Travel Encounters in the Far West. London and New York: Routledge, 1998.
- Costa, Fábio and Souza, Igor (2020). Rocha navegável. RV Cultura e Arte.
- Fountain, Charles (ed.) (2002). "The Cruise of the Flying Squadron, 1869–1870." Transcription of the Diary of Midshipman Marcus McCausland. https://sites.rootsweb.com/~pbtyc/Flying_Squadron/Contents.html Accessed 19 July 2026.
- Gledhill, Sabrina (2007). "Seppuku na Cidade do Salvador" (Seppuku in the City of Salvador).
- B., J. [Sir James Bruce] and Cavendish, Henry (1871). The Cruise Round the World of the Flying Squadron 1869–1870. London: Lake & Clench.
