= Lindalva Justo de Oliveira =

Brazilian nun

Blessed Lindalva Justo de Oliveira DC

Virgin and martyr
- Born: 20 October 1953; Sitio Malhada da Areia, Açu, Rio Grande do Norte, Brazil
- Died: 9 April 1993 (aged 39); Salvador, Bahia, Brazil
- Venerated in: Roman Catholic Church
- Beatified: 2 December 2007, Barradão Stadium, São Salvador de Bahia, Brazil by Cardinal José Saraiva Martins
- Major shrine: Capela das Relíquias da Beata Lindalva, Brazil
- Feast: 7 January

Lindalva Justo de Oliveira, DC (20 October 1953 – 9 April 1993) was a Brazilian Catholic member of the Daughters of Charity of Saint Vincent de Paul. Oliveira worked at Dom Pedro II Home, a retirement facility, where she was killed in 1993 after a man obsessed with her stabbed her 44 times when she refused his advances.

Oliveira's beatification received the approval of Pope Benedict XVI, who determined that she was killed in defensum castitatis (in defense of chastity). She was beatified on 2 December 2007, with Cardinal José Saraiva Martins presiding.

== Life ==
Lindalva Justo de Oliveira was born on 20 October 1953 in Brazil as the sixth of thirteen children to the farmer João Justo da Fé - a widower with three children - and Maria Lúcia da Fé (b. 1923); two brothers were Antonio and Djamla. As of 2014 her mother was still alive at age 91. Antonio was an alcoholic and went sober not long after she penned a letter to him.

Oliveira received her baptism on 7 January 1954 in the parish of Saint John the Baptist in the Chapel of Olho D'Água from Monsignor Júlio Alves Bezerra. Around 1961 her parents took their children elsewhere so as to provide for their educational needs.

She received her First Communion on 15 December 1965 and as of 1971 began to help raise her three nephews. Her parents tried to convince her to wed at this time but she deflected the conversation and instead said that she had three sons: her brother's three children that she helped care for. Oliveira lived with her brother, Djamla, in Natal for a time and received an administrative assistant's diploma in 1979. From 1978 until a decade later she worked in retail sales and also as a cashier at a petrol station. This was to provide for her ailing father and her mother and after the death of her father was for her mother's financial situation; leftover wages were for her personal use and she lived in Natal during this time.

As her father was on his deathbed in 1982 she aided him in his last months. He later summoned his children to him while asking a priest for the Anointing of the sick; he beseeched his children to persevere in the faith and devote themselves as best as possible to God. He died hours later in 1982 due to abdominal cancer. Not long after in 1982 she began a technical course in nursing. In 1986 she attended a vocational movement of the Vincentian Sisters and requested joining them at the end of 1987; the Archbishop of Natal Nivaldo Monte granted her the sacrament of Confirmation on 28 November 1987.

On 28 December 1987 she received a letter from the mother provincial accepting her entrance into the congregation. Her time as a postulant commenced on 11 February 1988 in Recife, where she commenced her novitiate on 16 July 1989.

She began to work at the shelter titled Don Pedro II Home in Bahia on 29 January 1991 to aid older people and the poor; she went on a retreat that same month while the forum was dedicated to the charism of Saint Vincent de Paul. Oliveira even took a driving test so she could take some of the people from the shelter for rides.

In 1993 a man named Augusto da Silva Peixoto (b. 1947) was admitted into the shelter despite the fact that he was not meant to be there at all; he became obsessed with Oliveira and began to harass her despite her best efforts to keep her distance from him while treating him like she did the others. Those around her convinced her to report it and on 30 March 1993 the official of the shelter – Margarita Maria Siva de Azevedo – rebuked him; Augusto responded on 5 April in purchasing a machete.

On 9 April 1993 de Oliveira participated in the Way of the Cross and returned to the shelter to serve breakfast at the Dom Pedro II Home. Augusto approached her as she served coffee and tapped her on the shoulder before thrusting a knife into her above the collar-bone as she turned around. She sank to the ground and cried out several times: "God protect me" while her attacker shouted: "I should have done this sooner!" A man attempted to intervene but Augusto warned those who approached would be killed. Augusto wiped the knife of blood on his clothes and threw it onto the floor before exclaiming to the horrified witnesses: "She did not want me!". He then said to the doctor that was summoned: "You can call the police, I will not run away; I did what had to be done". Augusto's reason for killing her was due to Oliveira refusing to give up the religious life to be with him as a lover. The killer sat on a bench outside the shelter and awaited the police; he was admitted to a mental hospital following his conviction. Coroners identified a total of 44 perforations in Oliveira.

Her funeral was celebrated on 10 April 1993 and the Dominican Cardinal Lucas Moreira Neves presided over the funeral. As of 6 April 2014 her remains are in the Capela das Relíquias da Beata Lindalva.

== Beatification ==
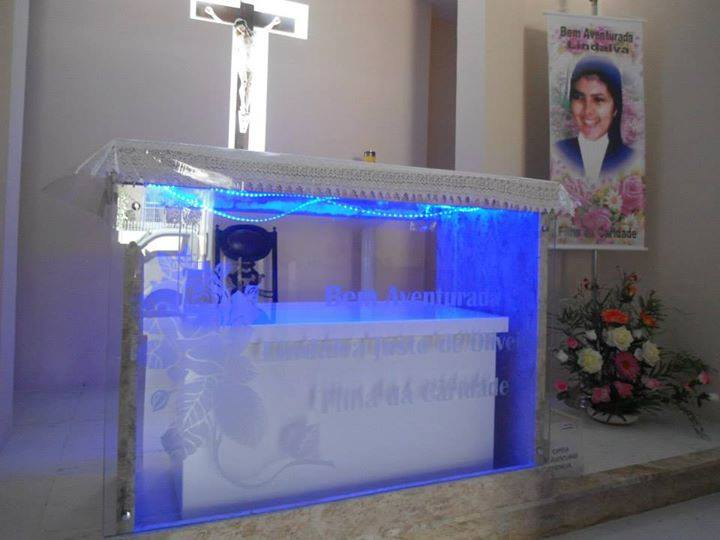
Tomb in 2015 in the chapel established in her honor.

The beatification process commenced in Brazil on 19 October 1999 under Pope John Paul II after the Congregation for the Causes of Saints declared "nihil obstat" ('nothing against') to the cause while also acknowledging her as a Servant of God. The diocesan process opened on 17 January 2000 and concluded its business not long after on 3 March 2001; the C.C.S. validated this process in Rome on 22 June 2001.

The Positio was sent to the C.C.S. in 2002 at which point it was retained until theologians met and approved the cause in a meeting on 26 September 2006; the C.C.S. also granted their approval to the merits of the cause on 21 November 2006. On 16 December 2006 her beatification received the papal approval of Pope Benedict XVI. The celebration was held in Brazil on 2 December 2007 and Cardinal José Saraiva Martins presided as the delegate the pontiff appointed in his stead.
