= São Pedro clock =

20th-century monument in Salvador, Bahia, Brazil

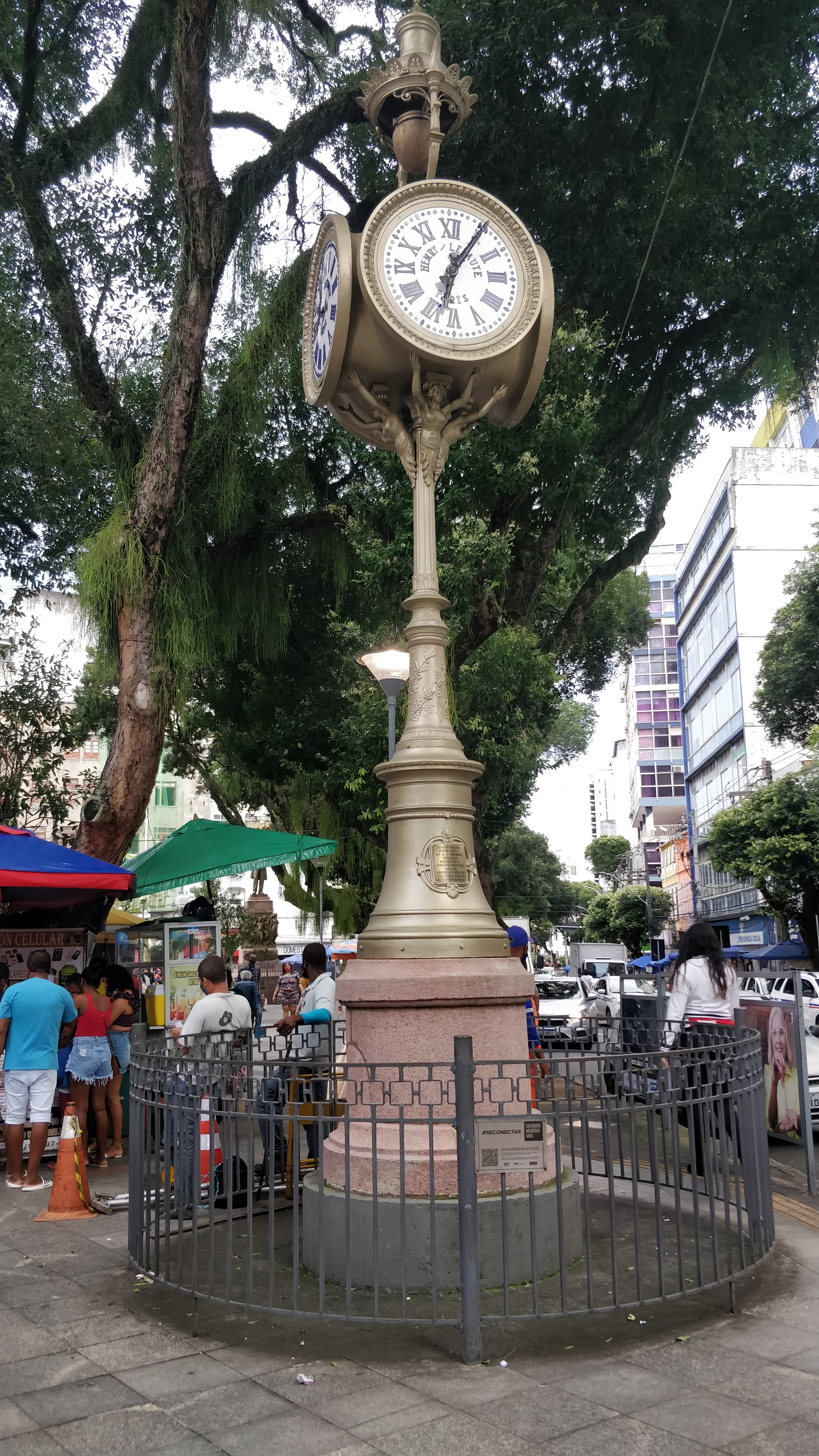
- Interactive map of São Pedro clock
- Location: Largo de São Pedro, Salvador, Bahia
- Coordinates: 12°58′52″S 38°30′52″W
- Designer: Pasquale de Chirico, Henry Lepaut
- Type: Street clock
- Material: Cast iron, granite
- Height: 6.5m
- Opening date: 15 November 1916

The São Pedro Clock is an open-air monument located in Salvador, the capital of the Brazilian state of Bahia. It is located in Largo de São Pedro, next to the monument to the Baron of Rio Branco, and where the São Pedro Church was previously located, demolished in 1913 for the construction of Avenida Sete de Setembro promoted by the then governor of Bahia J. J. Seabra. The result of an initiative by the Association of Employees in the Commerce of Bahia, it was inaugurated on November 15, 1916 (the day of the Proclamation of the Republic), already under the state government of Antonio Muniz de Aragão.

== Details ==
It consists of a bronze sculpture by the Italian artist based in Brazil Pasquale de Chirico, completed in Paris in 1914, and four Henri-Le Pante clocks made in Paris. Made with the techniques of casting and hewn stone, the material of the sculptural base of the clock is cast iron and pink granite. The monument is shaped like a lamppost with a lantern adorned above the clocks, and four figures of Atlas supporting them, and in all, it is 6.50 meters high.

Located in a commercial area of Salvador, in addition to showing the time, the monument is a historic landmark. The former São Pedro Church located there was the mother church of the parish of São Pedro Velho Extramuros, an extinct subdivision of Salvador named after the outside of the wall that surrounded the fortress city. Although extinct, São Pedro is an area of Salvador's Historic Center popularly treated as a small neighborhood.

In 1999, a vehicle collided with the monument and motivated major maintenance. Since then the maintenance of the clock is in charge of the clockmaker Wilson Ribeiro. In the context of the renovation of Avenida Sete by Salvador's City Hall, the São Pedro Clock had its rust spots removed, its mechanics repaired, its paint renewed, and its glasses replaced. The Gregório de Mattos Foundation (FGM), a municipal public foundation, was responsible for this restoration, which was completed on September 3, 2015.

== See also ==
- Avenida Sete de Setembro
- Tira Chapéu Palace
- Historic center of Salvador
