= Tira Chapéu Palace =

20th century Baroque palace in Salvador, Bahia, Brazil

- Edifício da Associação dos Empregados no Comércio da Bahia
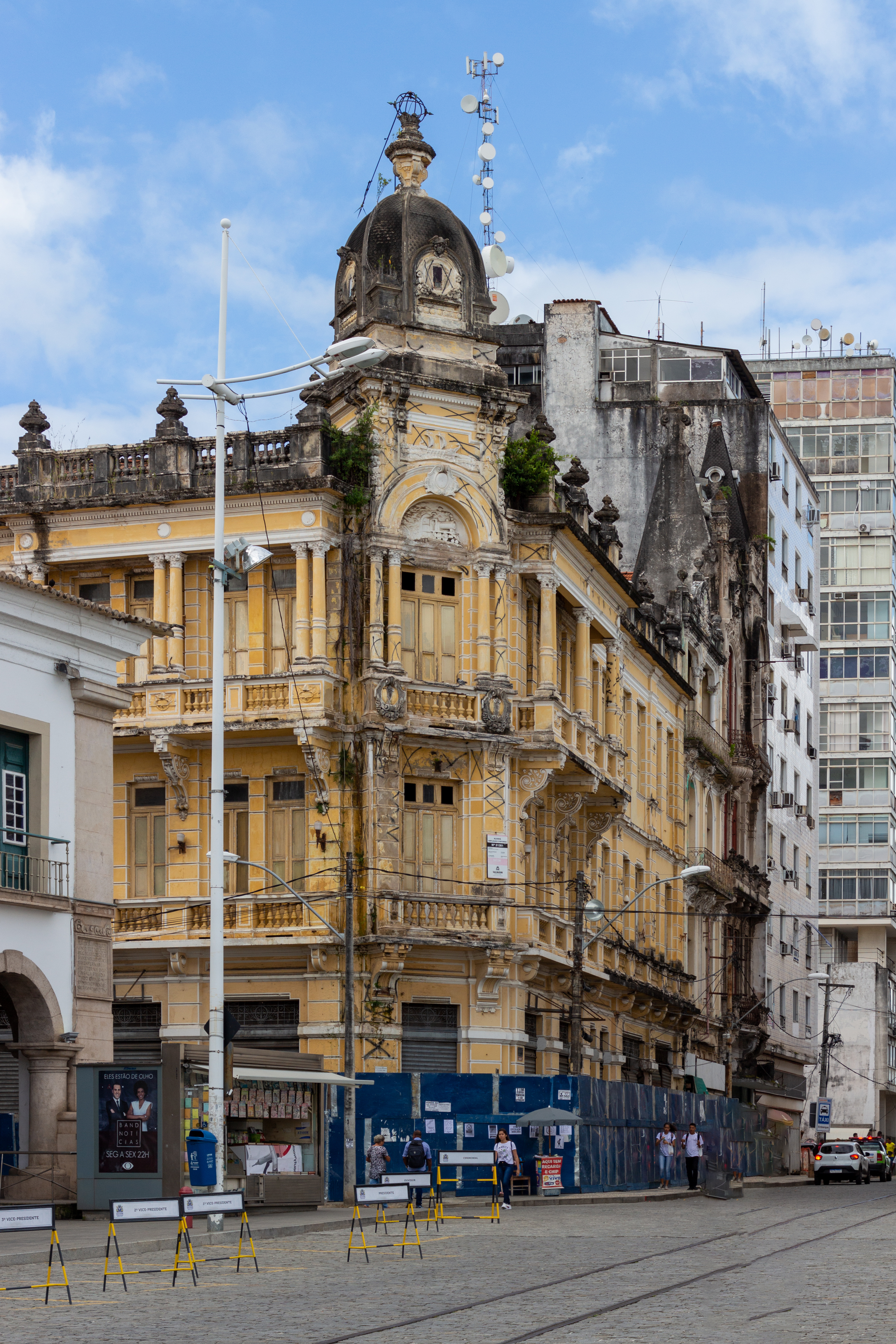
- Bahia's Trade Employees' Association Building in the year 2019.
- Interactive map of the Tira Chapéu Palace area

General information
- Type: Palace
- Architectural style: Baroque
- Location: Salvador, Bahia, Brazil
- Coordinates: 12°58′31″S 38°30′46″W
- Construction started: June 1916
- Completed: December 1917
- Inaugurated: 30 December 1917
- Owner: Original: Comendador Bernardo Martins Catharino, D. Úrsula da Costa Martins Catharino.; Now: Grupo Fera

Design and construction
- Architect: Alberto Borelli
- Awards: Listed property by Instituto do Patrimônio Artístico e Cultural da Bahia (IPAC)

The Edifício da Associação dos Empregados no Comércio da Bahia (in English: Bahia's Trade Employees' Association Building) or Palacete do Tira Chapéu (Tira Chapéu Palace) is a building inaugurated on December 30, 1917, designed to host the Trade Employees' Association (AECBA), located at the corner of Chile Street and Tira Chapéu Street, in Salvador, capital of the Brazilian state of Bahia.

== History ==
The history of the building is intrinsically linked with the history of the formation of Bahia's economic elite. It was conceived and financed by Commander Bernardo Martins Catharino - the owner of the palace that bears his name - the Comendador Bernardo Martins Catharino Palace. Located on Rua do Tira Chapéu at a corner of Rua Chile, it was organized by Italian engineer and architect Alberto Borelli representing the Companhia de Serraria e Construções.

Construction work on the building began in June 1916 and was completed at its inauguration on December 30, 1917, maintaining an architectural style focused on Baroque. In 1918, a donation was made by Bernardo Martins Catharino and his wife Ursula da Costa Martins Catharino to the workers' association.

The association headquarters was the stage for meetings and musical spectacles bringing together personalities from Bahia and the rest of the country. Besides its role as a labor organization, it was philanthropic through professionalizing and pioneering courses, such as the professional training of women. Until the early 2010s, the building continued to belong to the association, but only with the ground floor being used, while the upper floors were unoccupied.

In 2018, the project to turn the Tira Chapéu Palace into a gastronomic center in Salvador's Historic Center was announced, with several restaurants installed in the building. Grupo Fera, from the Minas Gerais businessman Antônio Mazzafera, bought the building around 2015, within the expansion of the business in this area of the city, whose base is the Fera Palace Hotel, and, in this case, is undertaken by Fera Investimentos alongside the companies Rio Verde and Elo. The restoration project was commissioned by Danish architect Adam Kurdahl and is inspired by two Spanish references: the Market of San Miguel in Madrid and El Nacional in Barcelona. When announced in 2018, it was expected to be completed in 2020, however, in 2020 it was revised to 2022 due to the recovery and restoration process, as well as raising funding for the commercial facilities. The first phase of the restoration work was completed in 2023 and an exhibit was created to showcase the details and facts of the process.

== Listing ==
The palace underwent the process of listing in 2011, assessed by the Bahia Institute of Artistic and Cultural Heritage (IPAC), the agency responsible for the preservation of Bahia's memory, under the process of Decree No. 13.151/2011. According to the director of IPAC, Frederico Mendonça, the listing "is beneficial, because when it is officially recognized, the property starts to have priority in restoration funding lines, whether municipal, state, federal, or even international. In addition, the listing prohibits the recharacterization of the building."

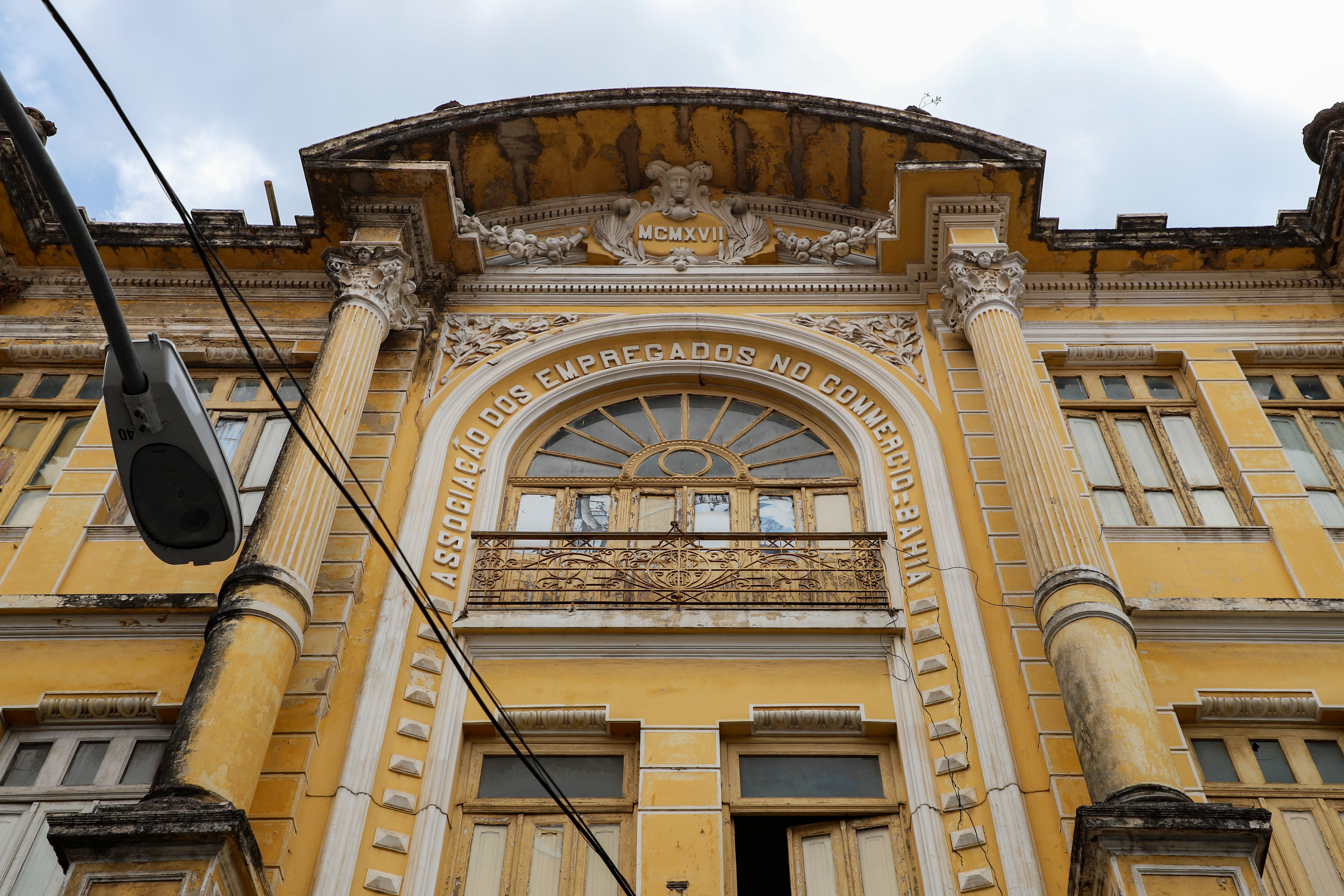
Main façade with its columns

== See also ==
- Baroque in Brazil
- Dom Pedro II Home
- Archbishop's Palace of Salvador
- São Pedro Clock
- Dom Pedro II Home
- Palace of the Commercial Association of Bahia
