= Dom Pedro II Home =

- Abrigo Dom Pedro II
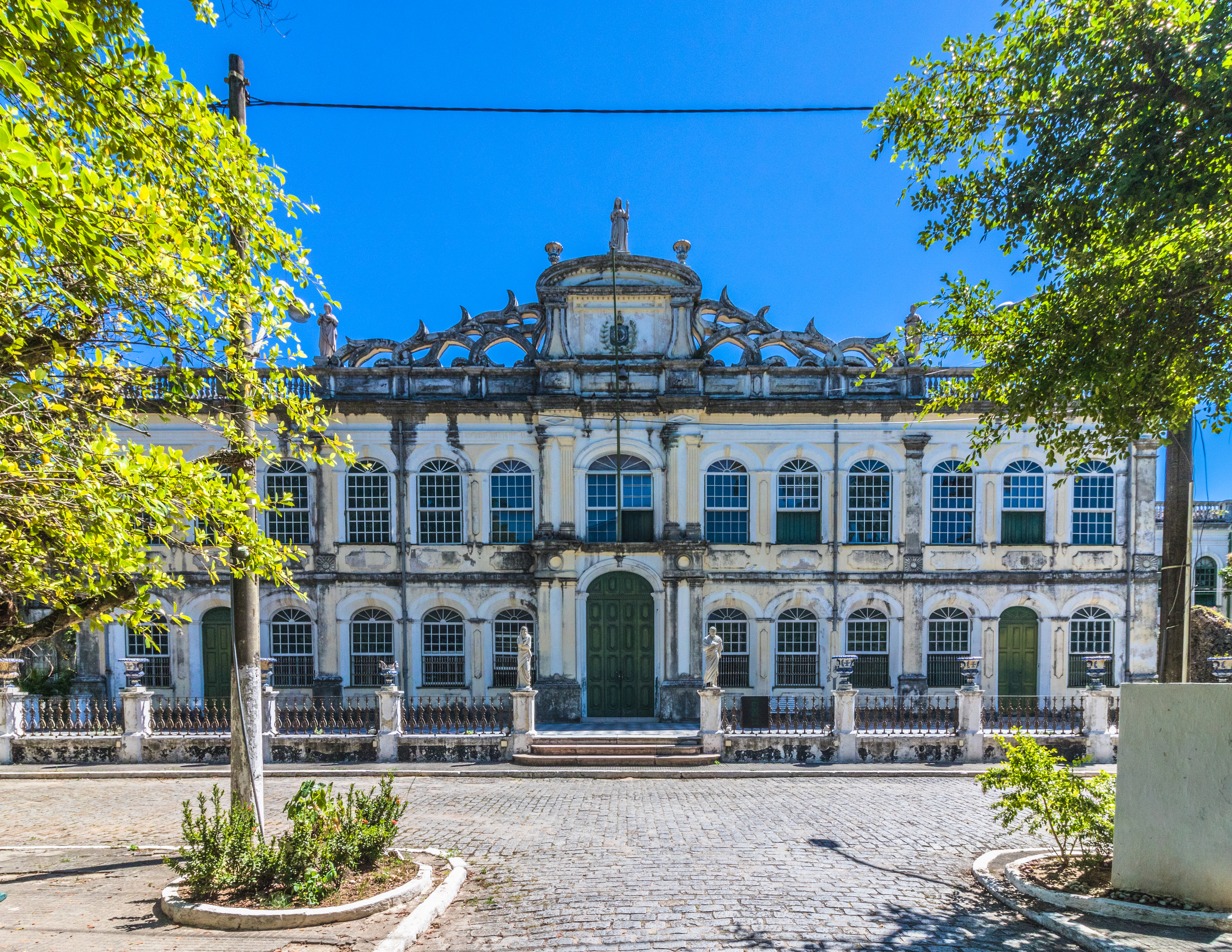
- Dom Pedro II Home, Salvador, Bahia, Brazil

- Location within Brazil
- Former names: Asilo de Mendicidade Santa Isabel, Palacete Machado
- Alternative names: Asilo Dom Pedro II

General information
- Type: Mansion, retirement home
- Architectural style: Neoclassical architecture
- Location: Avenida Luiz Tarquínio, 18-20, Bom Viagem, Salvador, Bahia, 40414-120, Brasil
- Coordinates: 12.9357°S 38.5087°W
- Completed: early 1800s
- Inaugurated: 1887

Technical details
- Floor count: 2
- Floor area: 120 square metres (1,300 sq ft)

National Historic Heritage of Brazil
- Designated: 1978
- Reference no.: 983

The Dom Pedro II Home (Portuguese: Abrigo Dom Pedro II, formerly known as Portuguese: Palacete Machado) and later Portuguese: Asilo de Mendicidade Santa Isabel, is an 18th-century retirement home in Salvador, Bahia, Brazil. It was built as the largest private residence in the 19th century in Bahia, and was renovated into a social services home in 1887. The current retirement home is administered by the Municipal Secretariat for Social Promotion and Fight against Poverty (SEMPS) of Salvador. The building, located at Avenida Luís Tarquínio nº 18, was listed as a historic structure by the National Institute of Historic and Artistic Heritage in 1978. The Dom Pedro II Home is likely the largest private residence built in Bahia, and is approximately 120 metres (390 ft) in length. Lindalva Justo de Oliveira, a Brazilian Vententian Sister, was murdered while working at the retirement home in 1993 and was subsequently beatified in 2007.

== Location ==
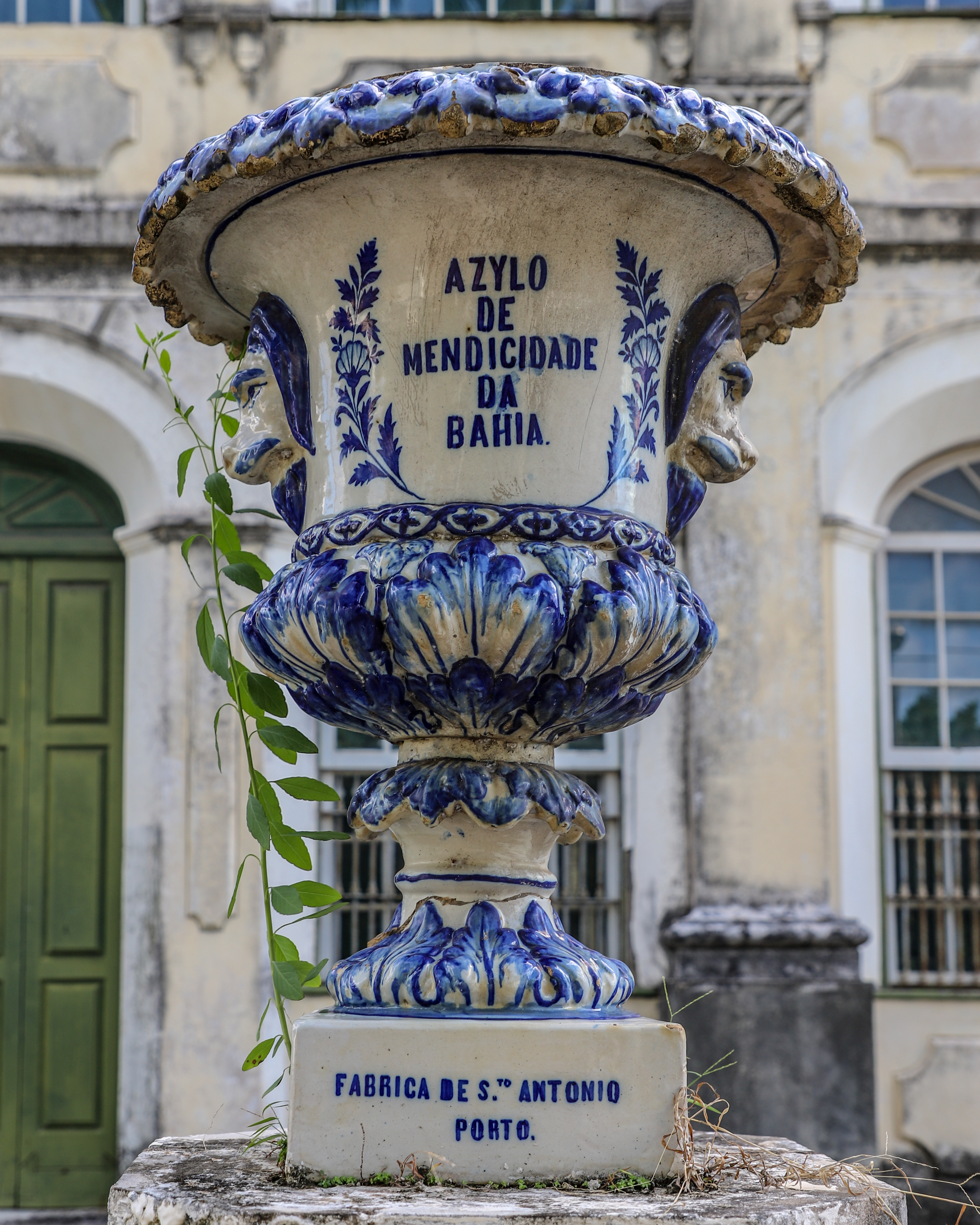
Decorative ceramic urn of the Santo António do Vale Factory

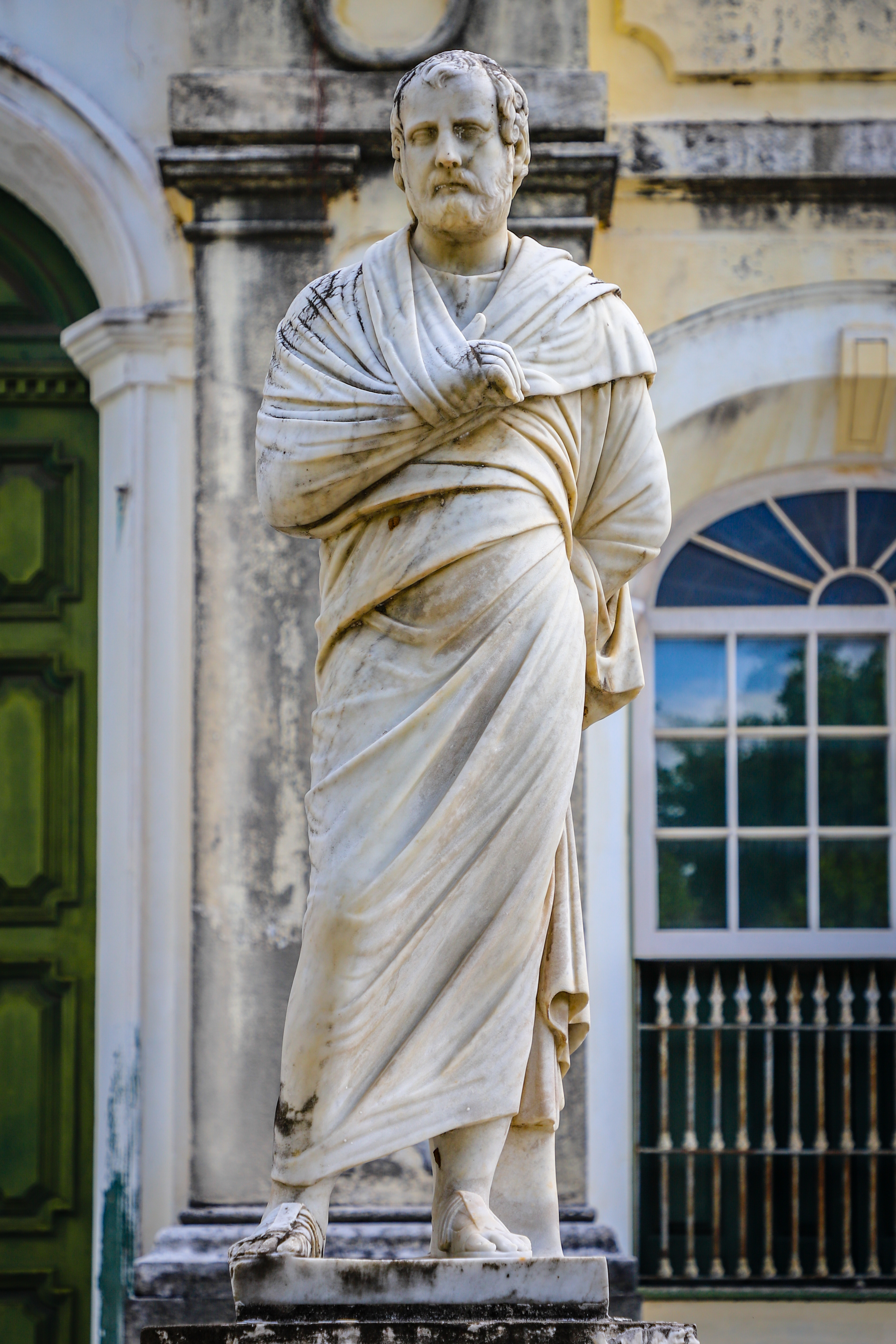
Neoclassical statue at entrance

The Dom Pedro II Home was built on a privileged location in Salvador on the south of the Itapagipe Peninsula facing the Bay of All Saints. The house is located on Avenida Luiz Tarquínio, which ranges from Praça da Bandeira (Praça Irma Dulce) northwest to the Fort of Monserrate. The home is one of many historic built on the southern shore of the peninsula, and is one of numerous federally protected structures on the peninsula. The house is constructed on the shores of the Bay of All Saints, and has a garden between the house and Avenida Luiz Tarquínio.

== History ==
Palacete Machado was built in the first half of the 19th century, and was the largest private residence in Bahia of the period. It was home to the Ambassador of Portugal and later the first director of Bank of Brazil. Antônio Gonçalves Gravata sold the house to Commander Francisco Xavier Machado in 1859. The mansion was subsequently altered into a social services home in the 1880s. It was re-inaugurated in 1887 as the Santa Isabel Poor House (Portuguese: Asilo de Mendicidade Santa Isabel) under the direction of the Santa Casa da Misericordia. The Santa Casa transferred ownership of the property to the City of Salvador in 1913. The home was renamed the Dom Pedro II Home (Portuguese: Abrigo Dom Pedro II) on June 18, 1943, and renamed for Pedro II, emperor of Brazil. It passed to the care of two religious communities, the Comunidade das Irmãs do Abrigo Dom Pedro II and the Companhia das Filhas de Caridade de São Vicente de Paulo.

The structure and grounds were renovated in 1997, but have since fallen into ruin. The cost of operating the retirement home and preservation of the historic structure caused significant financial difficulties, and operations of the retirement home was transferred in 2018 to another address.

=== Lindalva Justo de Oliveira ===
Lindalva Justo de Oliveira (1953-1993) is noted both for her work with the elderly poor at the Dom Pedro II Home. She left Recife in 1989 and began work at the retirement home in 1993. Oliveira celebrated Good Friday mass at the nearby Church of Boa Viagem on April 9, 1993, and was murdered at the Dom Pedro II Home by a mentally ill resident. Oliveira was stabbed 44 times. She was beatified on December 2, 2007.

== Structure ==
The Dom Pedro II Home is an urban manor house (sobrado) from the first half of the 19th century. Despite it numerous Neoclassical exterior details, it has the standard structure of stone masonry and follows the plan of a "great European Baroque palace." It is possibly a "provincial" replica of the Palace of Versailles. The structure is made up of three parts: a central block with a two long wings at each side. In total, the house is approximately 120 metres (390 ft) long. They are connected by corridors along the entire length of the building. The length of the façade has sash windows surmounted by lunettes and both the upper and lower floors.

The exterior of the central block and entrance has a wide patio enclosed by an elaborate fence with pillars are iron grating. The windows are only interrupted at the lower level by a large carved entrance doors and two smaller side doors. Neoclassical statues, urns, and other decorative elements are placed evenly across the pillars. The Imperial Coat of Arms of Pedro II were placed at the center of a Neoclassical-style pediment above the entrance building, and date to the 1880s.

Of special note are the numerous ceramic urns and statues produced by the Santo António do Vale Factory (Portuguese: Fábrica de Santo António do Vale) in Lisbon, a much-desired product in 19th century Brazil. A smaller number of Santo Antônio do Porto pieces can be found in Cachoeira and Santo Amaro, but the collection at the Dom Pedro II Home is the largest in Bahia. The fountain at the entrance on Avenida Luiz Tarquínio is original to the structure.

== Interior ==
The interior has spacious rooms that retain their original dimensions. The ground floor has a grand hall with a gallery of oil paintings and a table in jacaranda rosewood, all in the Dom João V style. Some alterations are visible in the interior of the building; they date to the 1880s when the residence was transformed into an asylum.

The interior has a chapel, the Capela Santa Izabel, directly behind the grand entrance. It was built in the 19th century and has a neoclassical altar, with a white background and talha dourada, or gilt wood carving.

== Protected status ==
The Dom Pedro II Home was listed as a historic structure by the National Institute of Historic and Artistic Heritage in 1978 under inscription number 983. The listing includes the wooden garden, statues, and ceramics produced by the Santo Antônio do Porto factory in Lisbon.

== Access ==
Abrigo Dom Pedro II is in an advanced state of disrepair. It is closed to the public and may not be visited.

== See also ==
- Tira Chapéu Palace
