= Fund for European Aid to the Most Deprived =

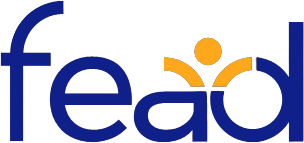
Logo of FEAD

The Fund for European Aid to the Most Deprived (FEAD) is a European Union program established in 2014, replacing the European Programme for the Most Deprived (PEAD).

== Background ==
Following the judgment of 13 April 2011 by the Court of Justice of the European Union (CJEU), the PEAD was discontinued as it no longer fulfilled its initial function of absorbing surpluses produced by European agriculture for charitable purposes. The scale of EU purchases became so significant that the CJEU considered that the PEAD was no longer linked to the CAP but fell under direct social assistance, and therefore should be financed within this framework, which is not communitarized.

A political agreement was formalized on 11 November 2011, by the Member States in order to continue the aid system in another form; the European Commission in agreement with the European Parliament and the European Council proposed, on 14 October 2012, a new fund aimed at replacing the PEAD from 2014. This new fund, created by a European regulation of 11 March 2014, was named: European Fund for Aid to the Most Deprived (FEAD).

== Objectives ==
The fund contributes to achieving several social policy objectives within the EU's competence: alleviating the most severe forms of poverty, by providing non-financial assistance to the most deprived through food aid and/or material assistance. The Europe 2020 strategy aims to reduce the number of people at risk of poverty and social exclusion by at least 20 million.
