= Beverlye Hyman Fead =

American artist

- Born: Beverlye Fisher; July 16, 1934 (age 91); Seattle, Washington, U.S.
- Occupation(s): Writer, documentary filmmaker and artist
- Spouse: (second husband) Bob Fead (m. 1992-2024; his death)
- Children: 4

Beverlye Hyman Fead (née Fisher; born July 1934) is an American artist, author and documentary filmmaker.

== Biography ==
=== Early life ===
Fead was born in Seattle, Washington as Beverlye Fisher on July 16, 1934. She and her family moved to California and settled in West Los Angeles. She went to Beverly Hills High School, and then graduated from Hamilton High School. She attended UCLA.

=== Cancer diagnosis and response ===
She was diagnosed with Stage IV uterine stromal sarcoma in 2002 and given two months to live. After seeing several doctors, she accepted an experimental treatment of Lupron shots every four months and a daily pill of Femora instead of the traditional chemotherapy and operation that had been prescribed. She is now leading a healthy and fulfilling life managing her cancer. Since then, she has written and had published two award-winning books: I Can Do This: Living With Cancer, and Nana, What's Cancer?, which aims to explain cancer to children. She produced an award-winning short documentary called Stage IV: Living With Cancer.

== Awards and recognition ==
Fead is a Legislative Ambassador and Hero of Hope for the American Cancer Society, and has been honored by the Israel Cancer Research Foundation of California and presented with the Courage Award from the Sarcoma Foundation of California.

In 2015, she was invited to speak at a briefing at the U.S. Capitol Building in Washington D.C. for the Alliance for Aging Research's launch of The Silver Book: Cancer. She was subsequently invited to become an advocate for the Global Healthspan Policy Institute.

== Personal life ==
Beverlye Fisher Hyman married, secondly, to music executive Bob Fead in 1992. They lived in Montecito, California for many years before moving back to Los Angeles. Bob Fead died in 2024, aged 89. Between them, the couple had four children and five grandchildren.
