= Seppuku =

Ritualistic suicide by disembowelment

- "Seppuku" in kanji

Japanese name
- Kanji: 切腹
- Hiragana: せっぷく
- Katakana: セップク
Transcriptions
- Romanization: Seppuku

Seppuku (切腹, lit. 'cutting [the] belly'), also called harakiri (腹切り, lit. 'abdomen/belly cutting', a native Japanese kun reading), is a form of Japanese ritualistic suicide by disembowelment. It was originally reserved for samurai in their code of honor (bushido), but was also practiced by other Japanese people during the Shōwa era (particularly officers near the end of World War II in Asia) to restore honor for themselves or for their families.

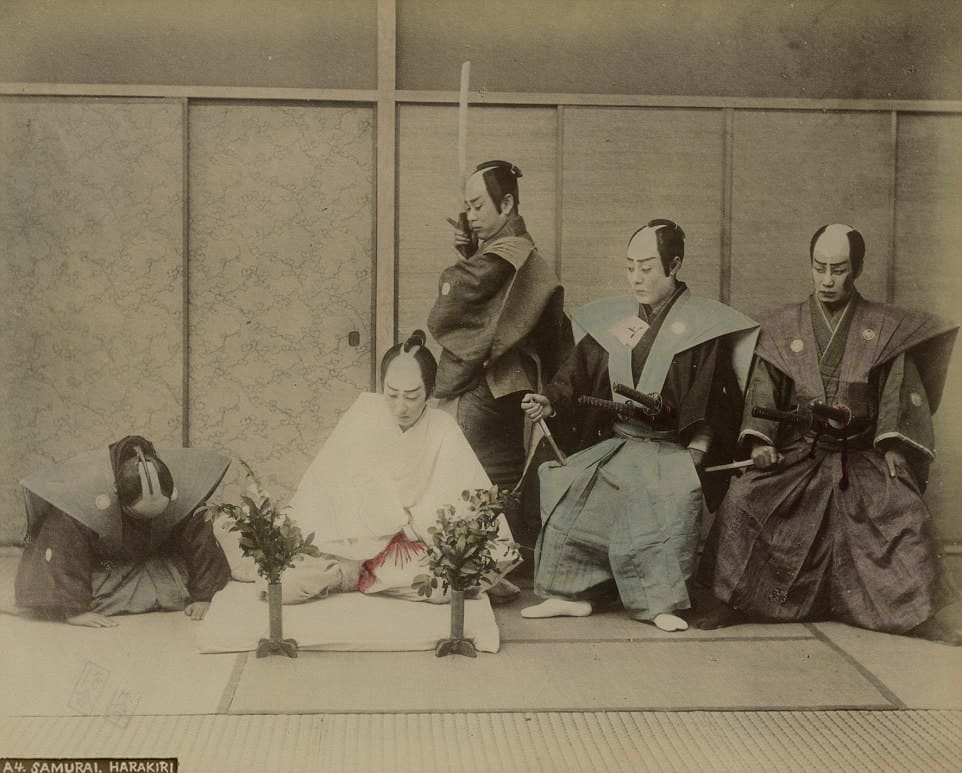
Staged seppuku with ritual attire and kaishakunin assistant, 1897

The practice dates back as far as the Heian period (794 to 1185), when it was done by samurai who were about to fall into the hands of their enemies and likely be tortured. By the time of the Meiji era (1868 to 1912), it had taken on an association with honor, and had also become a capital punishment for samurai who had committed serious offenses, sometimes involving a ritual imitation of cutting oneself (with a wooden dirk). The ceremonial disembowelment, which is usually part of a more elaborate ritual and performed in front of spectators, consists of plunging a short blade, traditionally a tantō, into the belly and drawing the blade from left to right, slicing the belly open. If the cut is deep enough, it can sever the abdominal aorta, causing death by rapid exsanguination.

One of the earliest recorded cases of seppuku was that of Minamoto no Tametomo, who had fought in the Hōgen war and, after being defeated, was exiled to Ōshima. He decided to try to take over the island. Minamoto's enemies sent troops to suppress his rebellion, so facing defeat, he committed seppuku in 1170. The ritual of seppuku was more concretely established in 1180 when, in the early years of the Genpei war, Minamoto no Yorimasa committed seppuku after composing a poem.

Sometimes a daimyō was called upon to perform seppuku as the basis of a peace agreement. This weakened the defeated clan so that resistance effectively ceased. Toyotomi Hideyoshi used an enemy's suicide in this way on several occasions, the most dramatic of which effectively ended a dynasty of daimyō. When the Hōjō clan were defeated at Odawara in 1590, Hideyoshi insisted on the suicide of the retired daimyō Hōjō Ujimasa and the exile of his son Ujinao. With this act of suicide, the most powerful daimyō family in eastern Japan was completely defeated.

== Etymology ==
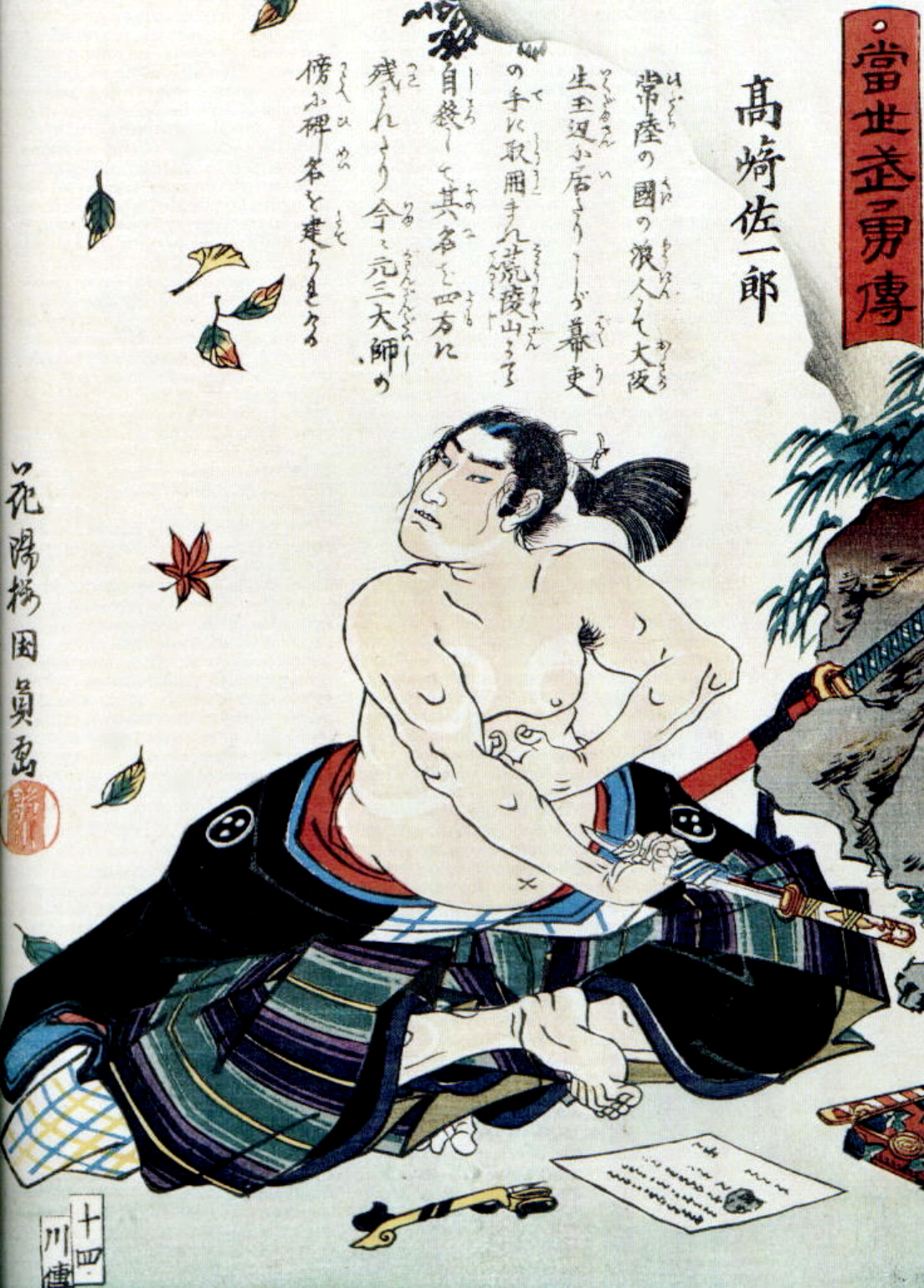
Samurai about to perform seppuku

The term seppuku is derived from the two Sino-Japanese roots setsu 切 ("to cut", from Middle Chinese tset; compare Mandarin qiē and Cantonese chit) and fuku 腹 ("belly", from MC pjuwk; compare Mandarin fù and Cantonese fūk). It is also known as harakiri (腹切り, "cutting the stomach"); often misspelled or mispronounced "hiri-kiri" or "hari-kari" by American English speakers. Harakiri is written with the same kanji as seppuku, but in reverse order with an okurigana. In Japanese, the more formal seppuku, a Chinese on'yomi reading, is typically used in writing, while harakiri, a native kun'yomi reading, is used in speech. As noted by Christopher Ross,

It is commonly pointed out that hara-kiri is a vulgarism, but this is a misunderstanding. Hara-kiri is a Japanese reading or Kun-yomi of the characters; as it became customary to prefer Chinese readings in official announcements, only the term seppuku was ever used in writing. So hara-kiri is a spoken term, but only to commoners and seppuku a written term, but spoken amongst higher classes for the same act.

The practice of performing seppuku at the death of one's master, known as oibara (追腹 or 追い腹, the kun'yomi or Japanese reading) or tsuifuku (追腹, the on'yomi or Chinese reading), follows a similar ritual.

The word jigai (自害) means "suicide" in Japanese. The modern word for suicide is jisatsu (自殺); related words include jiketsu (自決), jijin (自尽) and jijin (自刃). In some popular western texts, such as martial arts magazines, the term is associated with the suicide of samurai wives. The word was introduced into English by Lafcadio Hearn in his 1904 book Japan: An Attempt at Interpretation, which he describes as "piercing the throat with a dagger so as to sever the arteries". This understanding has since been translated into Japanese. Hearn described the term jigai to be the female equivalent of harakiri, which Japanologist Joshua S. Mostow notes is a misunderstanding. Mostow's context is analysis of Giacomo Puccini's Madame Butterfly and the original Cio-Cio San story by John Luther Long. Though both Long's story and Puccini's opera predate Hearn's use of the term jigai, the term has been used in relation to western Japonisme, which is the influence of Japanese culture on the western arts.

== Ritual ==
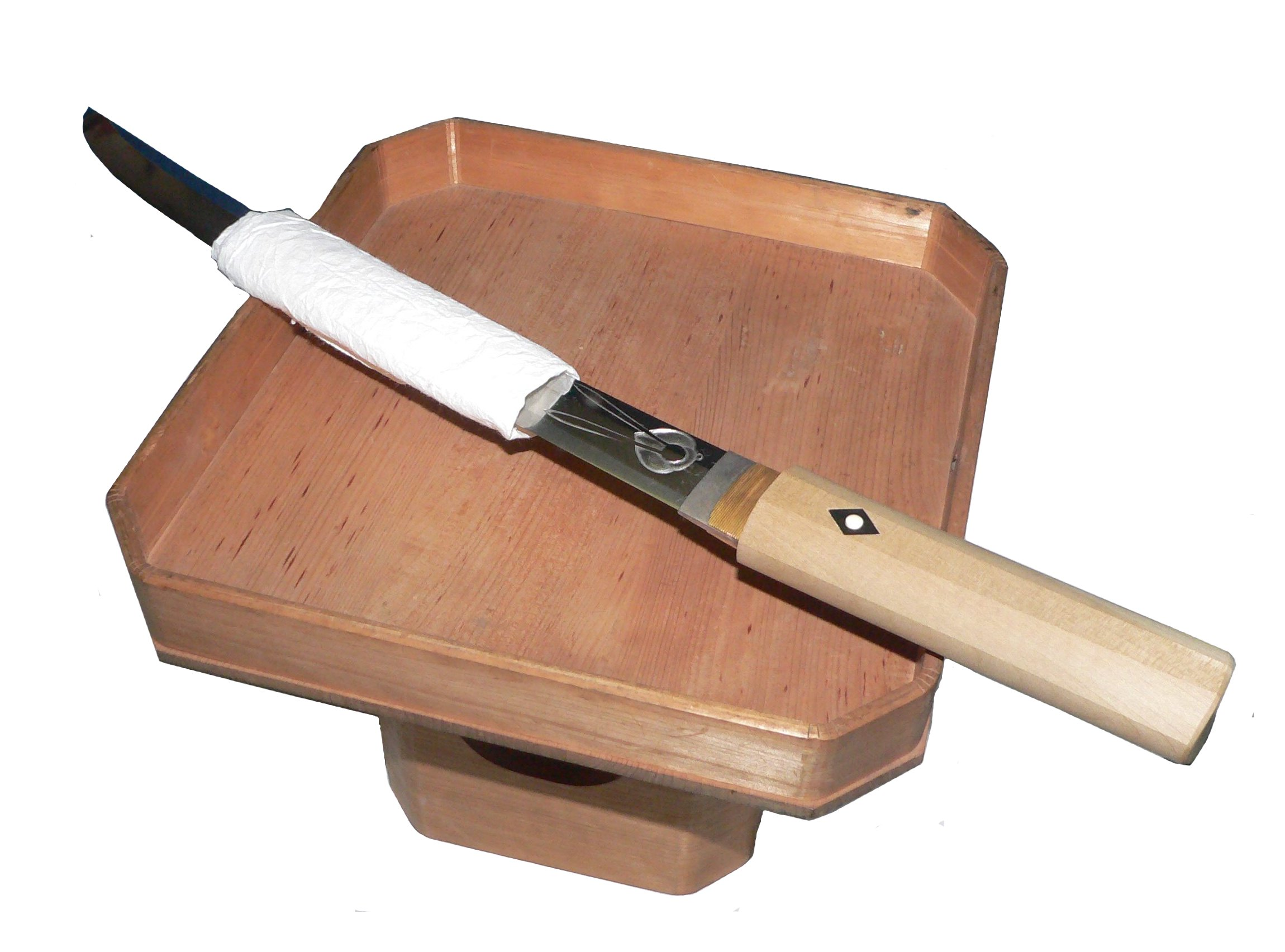
A tantō prepared for seppuku

The practice of seppuku was not standardized until the 17th century. In the 12th and 13th centuries, such as with the seppuku of Minamoto no Yorimasa, the practice of a kaishakunin had not yet emerged; thus, the rite was considered far more painful. The defining characteristic was plunging either the tachi (longsword), wakizashi (shortsword) or tantō (knife) into the gut and slicing the abdomen horizontally. In the absence of a kaishakunin, the samurai would then remove the blade and stab himself in the throat, or fall onto the blade from a standing position with it positioned against his heart.

During the Edo period (1600–1867), carrying out seppuku came to involve an elaborate, detailed ritual. This was usually performed in front of spectators if it was planned, as opposed to one performed on a battlefield. A samurai was bathed in cold water (to prevent excessive bleeding), dressed in a white kimono called the shiro-shōzoku (白装束), and served his favorite foods for a last meal. When he had finished, the knife and cloth were placed on a sanbo and given to the warrior. Dressed ceremonially, with his sword placed in front of him and sometimes seated on special clothes, the warrior would prepare for death by writing a death poem. He would probably consume a ceremonial drink of sake and would also give his attendant a cup meant for sake.

With his selected kaishakunin standing by, he would open his kimono, take up his tantō – held by the blade with a cloth wrapped around so that it would not cut his hand and cause him to lose his grip – and plunge it into his abdomen, making a left-to-right cut. The kaishakunin would then perform kaishaku, a cut in which the warrior was partially decapitated. The maneuver should be done in the manners of dakikubi (lit. 'embraced head'), in which a slight band of flesh is left attaching the head to the body so that the head can dangle in front as if embraced. Because of the precision necessary for such a maneuver, the kaishakunin was a skilled swordsman. The principal and the kaishakunin agreed in advance when the latter was to make his cut. Usually, dakikubi would occur as soon as the dagger was plunged into the abdomen.

Over time, the process became so highly ritualized that as soon as the samurai reached for his blade, the kaishakunin would strike. Eventually, even the blade became unnecessary and the samurai could reach for something symbolic like a fan, and this alone would trigger the killing stroke from his kaishakunin. A fan was likely used when the samurai was too old to use a blade or in situations where it was too dangerous to give him a weapon.

This elaborate ritual evolved after seppuku had ceased being mainly a battlefield or wartime practice and became a para-judicial institution. The kaishakunin was usually, but not always, a friend. If a defeated warrior had fought honorably and well, an opponent who wanted to salute his bravery would volunteer to act as his kaishakunin.

In the Hagakure, Yamamoto Tsunetomo wrote:

From ages past it has been considered an ill-omen by samurai to be requested as kaishaku. The reason for this is that one gains no fame even if the job is well done. Further, if one should blunder, it becomes a lifetime disgrace. In the practice of past times, there were instances when the head flew off. It was said that it was best to cut leaving a little skin remaining so that it did not fly off in the direction of the verifying officials.

A specialized form of seppuku in feudal times was known as kanshi (諫死; lit. 'remonstration death or death of understanding'), in which a retainer would commit suicide in protest of a lord's decision. The retainer would make one deep, horizontal cut into his abdomen, then quickly bandage the wound. After this, the person would then appear before his lord, give a speech in which he announced the protest of the lord's action, then reveal his mortal wound. This is not to be confused with funshi (憤死; lit. 'indignation death'), which is any suicide made to protest or state dissatisfaction.

Some samurai chose to perform a considerably more taxing form of seppuku known as jūmonji giri (十文字切り; lit. 'cross-shaped cut'), in which there is no kaishakunin to put a quick end to the samurai's suffering. It involves a second and more painful vertical cut on the belly. A samurai performing jūmonji giri was expected to bear his suffering quietly until he bled to death, dying with his hands over his face.

== Female ritual suicide ==
Female ritual suicide (incorrectly referred to in some English sources as jigai) was practiced by the wives of samurai who had performed seppuku or brought dishonor.

Some women belonging to samurai families died by suicide by cutting the arteries of the neck with one stroke, using a knife such as a tantō or kaiken. The main purpose was to achieve a quick and certain death in order to avoid capture or rape. Before dying, a woman would often tie her knees together so her body would be found in a "dignified" pose, despite the convulsions of death. Invading armies would often enter homes to find the lady of the house seated alone, facing away from the door. On approaching her, they would find that she had ended her life long before they reached her.

=== History ===
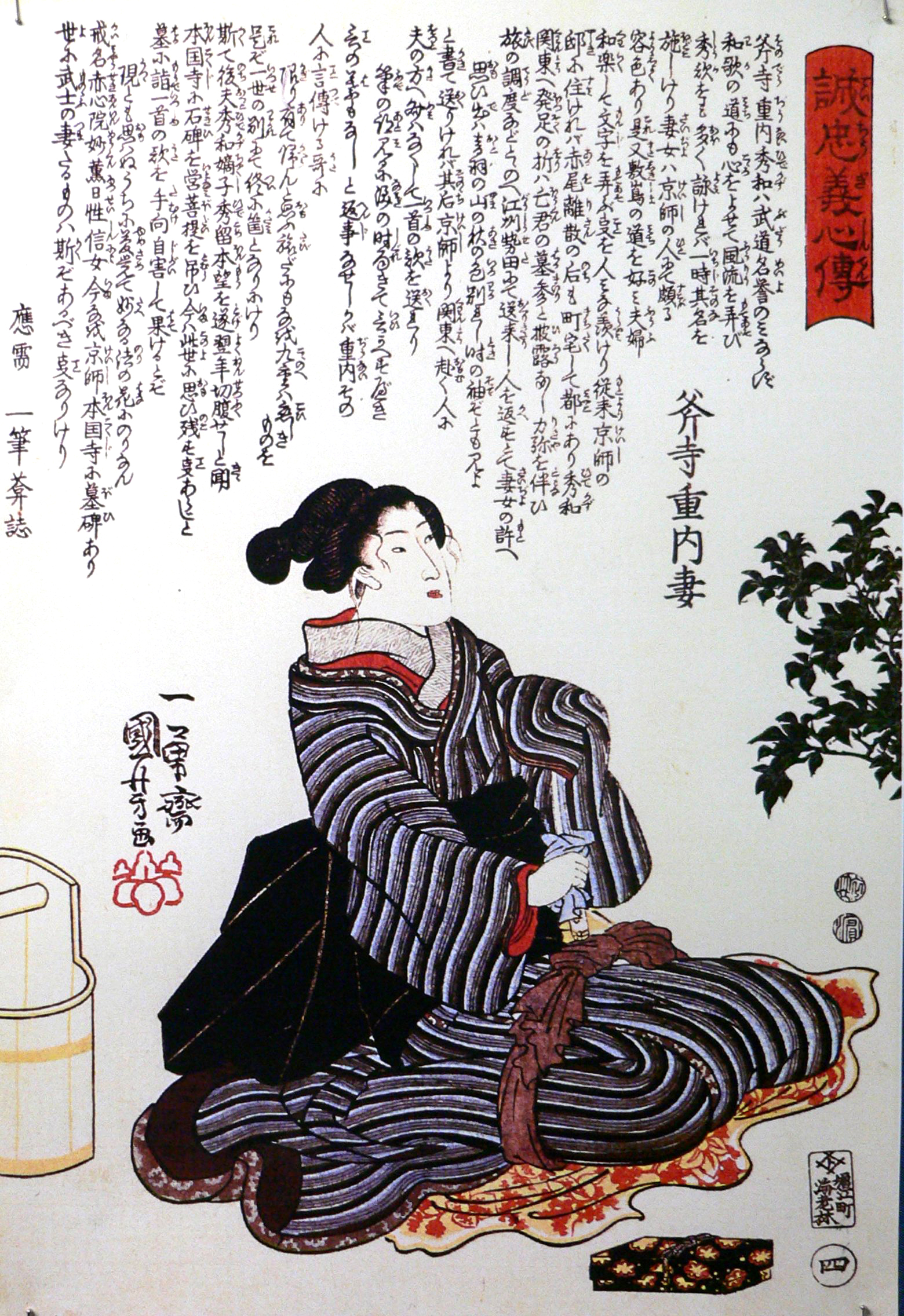
Well known ukiyo-e print by Utagawa Kuniyoshi purporting to show how the wife of Onodera Junai, one of the forty-seven rōnin, prepares for her suicide; note the legs tied together, a feature of female seppuku to ensure a decent posture in death. (In reality, she starved herself to death.)

Stephen R. Turnbull provides extensive evidence for the practice of female ritual suicide, notably of samurai wives, in pre-modern Japan; one of the largest mass suicides was the 25 April 1185 final defeat of Taira no Tomomori, in the Battle of Dan-no-ura.

Onodera Tan (小野寺 丹), the wife of Onodera Junai of the forty-seven rōnin, is a notable example of a wife following a samurai husband's seppuku: she is said to have starved herself to death after her husband's death. Her grave is located at the site where Ryokaku-in Temple (了覚院), a sub-temple of the Honkoku-ji Temple (本圀寺), once stood, in current-day Shimogyō-ku, Kyoto. (Note: Onodera Tan's grave can be found on the northernmost point of the sidewalk in front of Kujō-in Temple (久成院): 34.99754°N 135.75148°E. It is inscribed with: "Grave of the valiant Tan, wife of Akō samurai Onodera Jūnai" (赤穂義士 小野寺十内妻烈婦丹女之墓))

A large number of "honor suicides" marked the defeat of the Aizu clan in the Boshin War of 1869, leading into the Meiji era. For example, in the family of Saigō Tanomo, who survived, a total of twenty-two female honor suicides are recorded among one extended family.

=== Religious and social context ===
Voluntary death by drowning was a common form of ritual or honor suicide. The religious context of thirty-three Jōdo Shinshū adherents at the funeral of Abbot Jitsunyo in 1525 was faith in Amida Buddha and belief in rebirth in his Pure Land, but male seppuku did not have a specifically religious context. By way of contrast, the religious beliefs of Hosokawa Gracia, the Christian wife of daimyō Hosokawa Tadaoki, prevented her from committing suicide.

== As capital punishment ==
While voluntary seppuku is the best known form, in practice, the most common form of seppuku was obligatory seppuku, used as a form of capital punishment for disgraced samurai, especially for those who committed a serious offense such as rape, robbery, corruption, unprovoked murder, or treason. The samurai were generally told of their offense in full and given a set time for them to commit seppuku, usually before sunset on a given day. On occasion, if the sentenced individuals were uncooperative, seppuku could be carried out by an executioner, or more often, the actual execution was carried out solely by decapitation while retaining only the trappings of seppuku; even the tantō laid out in front of the uncooperative offender could be replaced with a fan (to prevent uncooperative offenders from using the tantō as a weapon against the observers or the executioner). This form of involuntary seppuku was considered shameful and undignified. Unlike voluntary seppuku, seppuku carried out as capital punishment by executioners did not necessarily absolve or pardon the offender's family of the crime. Depending on the severity of the crime, all or part of the property of the condemned could be confiscated, and the family would be punished by being stripped of rank, sold into long-term servitude, or executed.

Seppuku was considered the most honorable capital punishment apportioned to samurai. Zanshu (斬首) and sarashikubi (晒し首), decapitation followed by a display of the head, was considered harsher and was reserved for samurai who committed greater crimes. The harshest punishments, usually involving death by torturous methods like kamayude (釜茹で) (death by boiling), were reserved for commoner offenders.

Forced seppuku came to be known as "conferred death" over time as it was used for punishment of criminal samurai.

== Recorded events ==
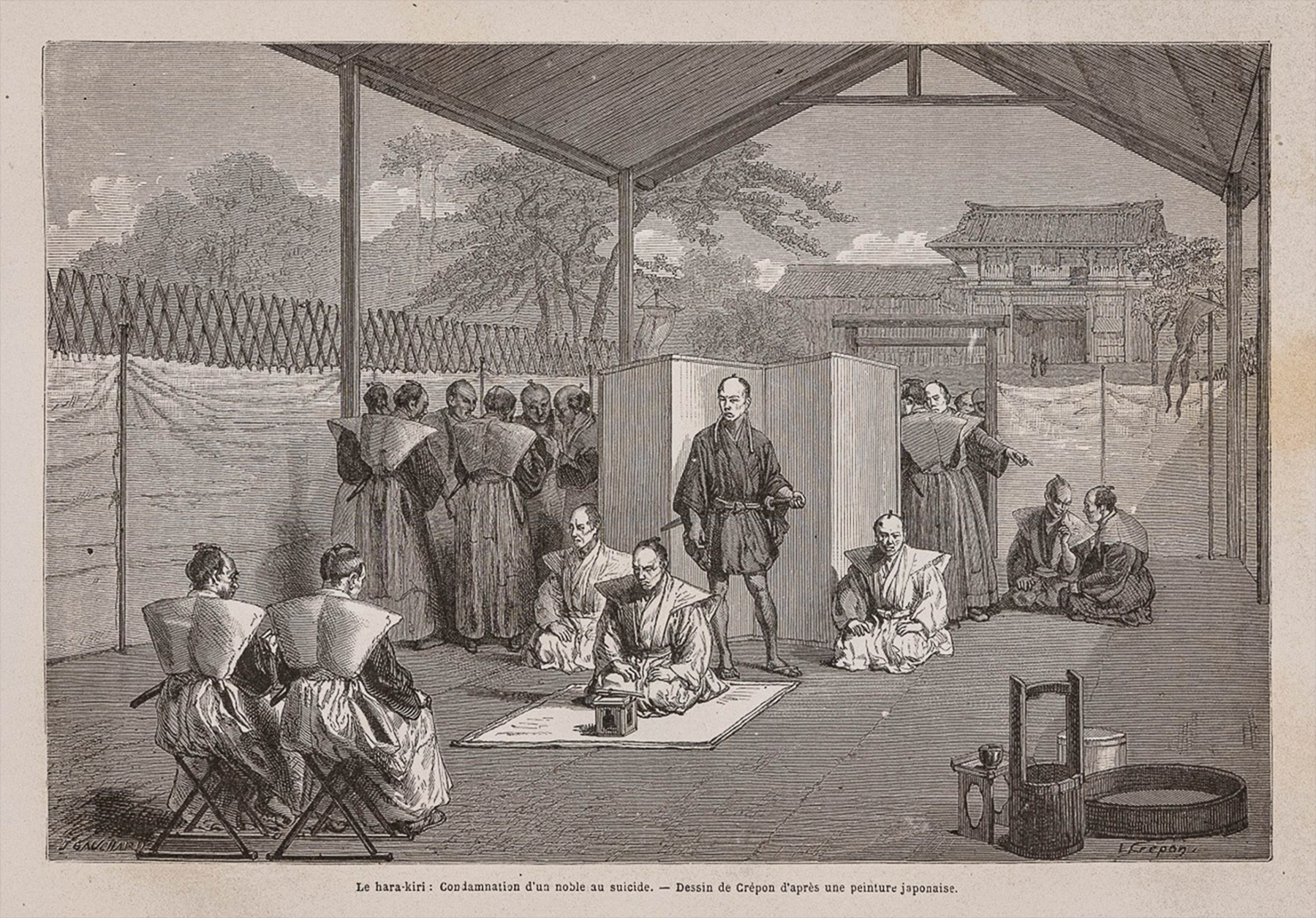
Illustration titled Harakiri: Condemnation of a nobleman to suicide; drawing by L. Crépon adapted from a Japanese painting, 1867

=== The Kobe Incident ===
In February 1868, following the Kobe Incident, the British Ambassador to Japan, Bertram Freeman-Mitford (Lord Redesdale), was invited to witness the seppuku of Taki Zenzaburō. In his book, Tales of Old Japan (1871), he describes the event in detail:

The condemned man was Taki Zenzaburô, an officer of the Prince of Bizen, who gave the order to fire upon the foreign settlement at Hyogo in the month of February 1868. Up to that time no foreigner had witnessed such an execution, which was rather looked upon as a traveler's fable.

The ceremony, which was ordered by the Mikado [Emperor] himself, took place at 10:30 at night in the temple of Seifukuji, the headquarters of the Satsuma troops at Hiogo. A witness was sent from each of the foreign legations. We were seven foreigners in all.

[...]

After another profound obeisance, Taki Zenzaburo, in a voice which betrayed just so much emotion and hesitation as might be expected from a man who is making a painful confession, but with no sign of either in his face or manner, spoke as follows:—

I, and I alone, unwarrantably gave the order to fire on the foreigners at Kôbé, and again as they tried to escape. For this crime I disembowel myself, and I beg you who are present to do me the honour of witnessing the act.

Bowing once more, the speaker allowed his upper garments to slip down to his girdle, and remained naked to the waist. Carefully, according to custom, he tucked his sleeves under his knees to prevent himself from falling backwards; for a noble Japanese gentleman should die falling forwards. Deliberately, with a steady hand, he took the dirk that lay before him; he looked at it wistfully, almost affectionately; for a moment he seemed to collect his thoughts for the last time, and then stabbing himself deeply below the waist on the left-hand side, he drew the dirk slowly across to the right side, and, turning it in the wound, gave a slight cut upwards. During this sickeningly painful operation he never moved a muscle of his face. When he drew out the dirk, he leaned forward and stretched out his neck; an expression of pain for the first time crossed his face, but he uttered no sound. At that moment the kaishaku, who, still crouching by his side, had been keenly watching his every movement, sprang to his feet, poised his sword for a second in the air; there was a flash, a heavy, ugly thud, a crashing fall; with one blow the head had been severed from the body.

A dead silence followed, broken only by the hideous noise of the blood throbbing out of the inert heap before us, which but a moment before had been a brave and chivalrous man. It was horrible.

The kaishaku made a low bow, wiped his sword with a piece of rice paper which he had ready for the purpose, and retired from the raised floor; and the stained dirk was solemnly borne away, a bloody proof of the execution.

The two representatives of the Mikado then left their places, and, crossing over to where the foreign witnesses sat, called us to witness that the sentence of death upon Taki Zenzaburo had been faithfully carried out. The ceremony being at an end, we left the temple.

=== The Sakai incident ===
In March 1868, eleven French sailors of the Dupleix entered the town of Sakai, in the Osaka Prefecture, without official permission. Their presence caused panic among the residents. Security forces were dispatched to turn the sailors back to their ship, but a fight broke out and the sailors were shot dead. This is usually referred to as the "Sakai Incident".

Upon the protest of the French representative, financial compensation was paid, and those responsible were sentenced to death. Captain Abel-Nicolas Bergasse du Petit-Thouars was present to observe the execution. As each samurai committed ritual disembowelment, the violent act shocked the captain, and he requested a pardon, as a result of which nine of the samurai were spared. This incident was dramatized in a famous short story, "Sakai Jiken", by Mori Ōgai.

=== Other accounts ===
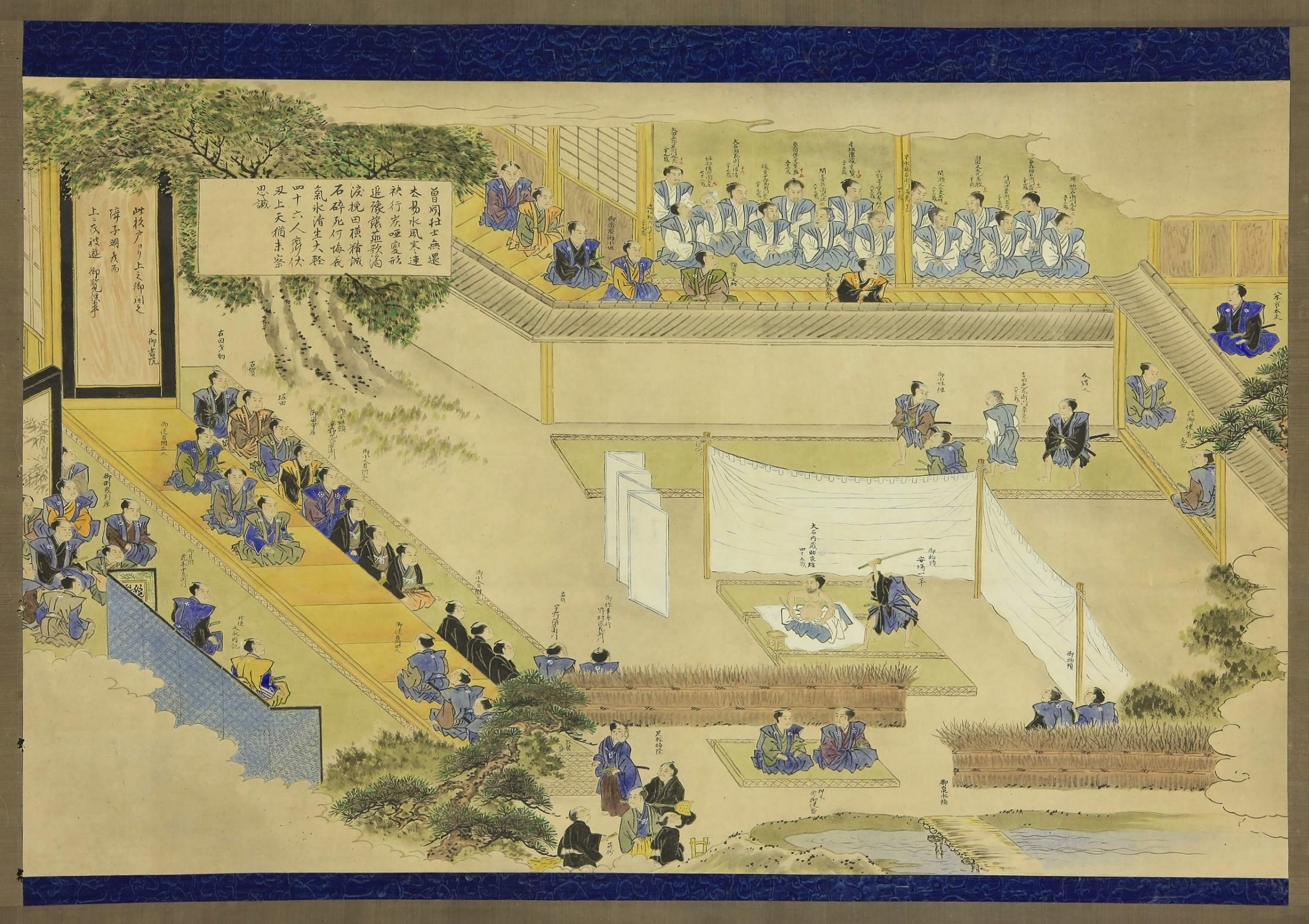
Ōishi Yoshio was sentenced to commit seppuku in 1703.

In his book, Tales of Old Japan, Mitford also relates living within sight of Sengaku-ji, the temple where the forty-seven rōnin are buried. He describes a man who had come to the graves to kill himself:

In the month of September 1868, a certain man came to pray before the grave of Oishi Chikara. Having finished his prayers, he deliberately performed hara kiri, and, the belly wound not being mortal, dispatched himself by cutting his throat. Upon his person were found papers setting forth that, being a Rônin and without means of earning a living, he had petitioned to be allowed to enter the clan of the Prince of Chôshiu, which he looked upon as the noblest clan in the realm; his petition having been refused, nothing remained for him but to die, for to be a Rônin was hateful to him, and he would serve no other master than the Prince of Chôshiu : what more fitting place could he find in which to put an end to his life than the graveyard of these Braves?

Mitford also describes someone else's account of a more extreme seppuku:

The case of a young fellow, only twenty years old, of the Choshiu clan, which was told me the other day by an eye-witness, deserves mention as a marvellous instance of determination. Not content with giving himself the one necessary cut, he slashed himself thrice horizontally and twice vertically. Then he stabbed himself in the throat until the dirk protruded on the other side, with its sharp edge to the front; setting his teeth in one supreme effort, he drove the knife forward with both hands through his throat, and fell dead.

== In modern Japan ==
Seppuku as judicial punishment was abolished in 1873, shortly after the Meiji Restoration, but voluntary seppuku did not completely die out. It persisted still among the armed forces, with a famous example being the seppuku of General Nogi Maresuke and his wife on the death of Emperor Meiji in 1912. It also occurred during World War II. The practice had been widely praised in army propaganda, which featured a soldier captured by the Chinese in the Shanghai Incident (1932) who returned to the site of his capture to perform seppuku. Many high-ranking military officials of Imperial Japan committed seppuku toward the latter half of World War II in 1944 and 1945, as the tide of the war turned against the Japanese, and it became clear that a Japanese victory of the war was not achievable.

In 1970, ultranationalist author Yukio Mishima and one of his followers performed public seppuku at the Japan Self-Defense Forces headquarters following an unsuccessful attempt to incite the armed forces to stage a coup d'état. Mishima performed seppuku in the office of General Kanetoshi Mashita. His kaishakunin, a 25-year-old man named Masakatsu Morita, tried three times to ritually behead Mishima but failed, and his head was finally severed by Hiroyasu Koga, a former kendo champion. Morita then attempted to perform seppuku himself, but when his own cuts were too shallow to be fatal, he gave the signal and was beheaded by Koga.

== Notable cases ==
List of notable seppuku cases in chronological order.

- Minamoto no Tametomo (1170)
- Minamoto no Yorimasa (1180)
- Minamoto no Yoshitsune (1189)
- Hōjō Takatoki (1333)
- Ashikaga Mochiuji (1439)
- Azai Nagamasa (1573)
- Oda Nobunaga (1582)
- Takeda Katsuyori (1582)
- Shibata Katsuie (1583)
- Sassa Narimasa (1588)
- Hōjō Ujimasa (1590)
- Sen no Rikyū (1591)
- Toyotomi Hidetsugu (1595)
- Torii Mototada (1600)
- Tokugawa Tadanaga (1634)
- Asano Naganori (1701)
- Forty-six of the forty-seven rōnin (1703)
- Watanabe Kazan (1841)
- Tanaka Shinbei (1863)
- Takechi Hanpeita (1865)
- Yamanami Keisuke (1865)
- Byakkotai (group of samurai youths) (1868)
- Maeda Jurozaemon (1870)
- Saigō Takamori (1877)
- Emilio Salgari (1911)
- Nogi Maresuke and Nogi Shizuko (1912)
- Chujiro Hayashi (1940)
- Seigō Nakano (1943)
- Yoshitsugu Saitō (1944)
- Hideyoshi Obata (1944)
- Kunio Nakagawa (1944)
- Mitsuru Ushijima (1945)
- Isamu Chō (1945)
- Korechika Anami (1945)
- Takijirō Ōnishi (1945)
- Chikahiko Koizumi (1945)
- Yukio Mishima (1970)
- Masakatsu Morita (1970)
- Isao Inokuma (2001)

== In popular culture ==
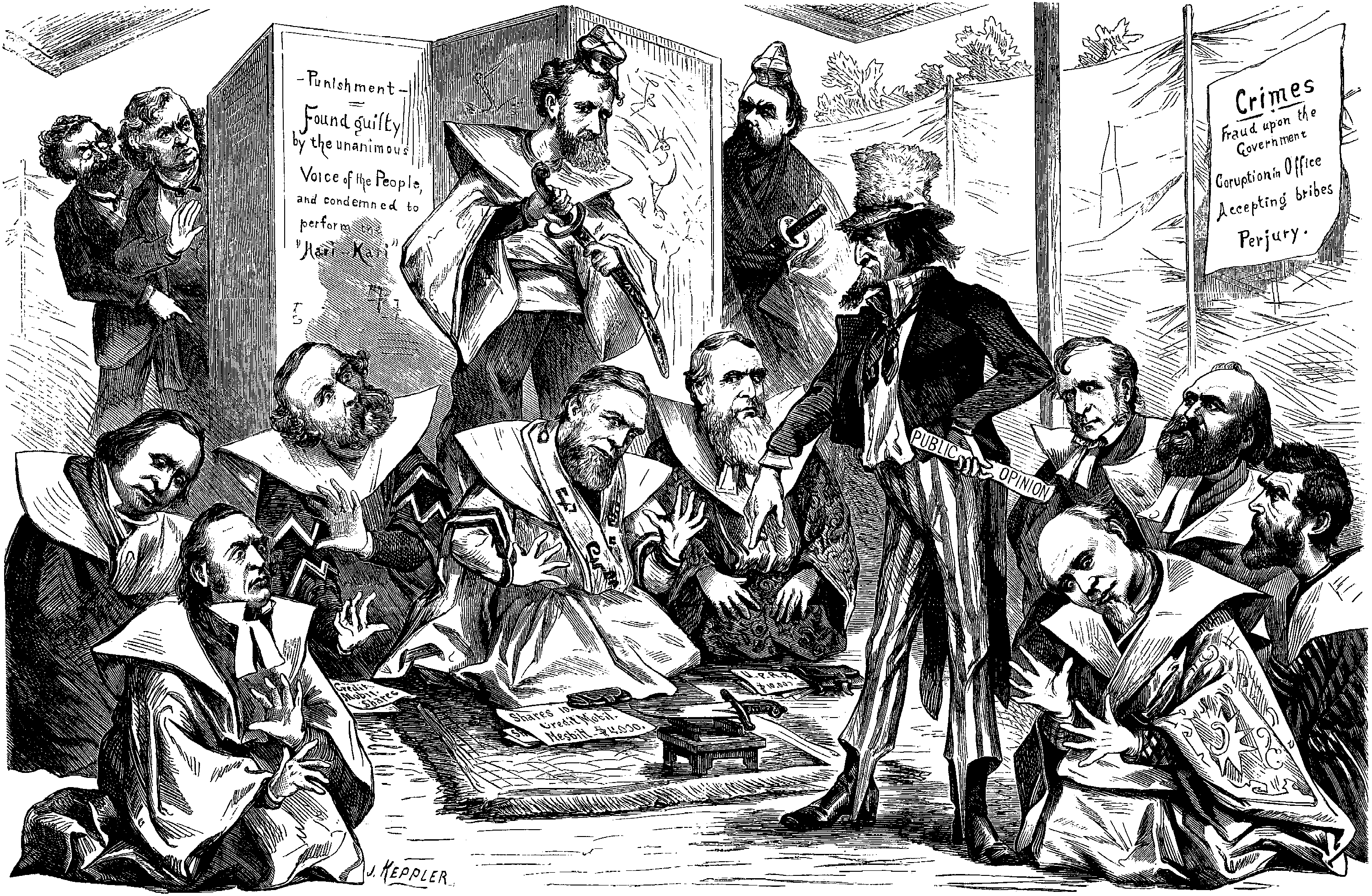
In Joseph Keppler's cartoon published in Frank Leslie's Illustrated Newspaper on March 8, 1873, Uncle Sam is shown directing U.S. Senators implicated in the Crédit Mobilier Scandal to commit "Hari-Kari", clearly showing that by that time the general American public was already familiar with the Japanese ritual and its social implications.

The story of the forty-seven rōnin (Chūshingura), who commit mass seppuku after avenging their lord, has inspired numerous works of Japanese art including bunraku puppet plays, kabuki plays and at least six film adaptations, as well as the Hollywood movie 47 Ronin.

The expected honor suicide of the samurai wife is frequently referenced in Japanese literature and film, such as in Taiko by Eiji Yoshikawa, Humanity and Paper Balloons, and Rashomon.

In Puccini's 1904 opera Madame Butterfly, wronged child-bride Cio-Cio-san commits seppuku in the final moments of the opera, after hearing that the father of her child—although he has finally returned to Japan, much to her initial delight—had in the meantime married an American lady and has come to take her child away from her.

Seppuku is referenced and described multiple times in the 1975 James Clavell novel, Shōgun; its subsequent 1980 miniseries Shōgun brought the term and the concept to mainstream Western attention. The 2024 adaptation also follows suit in this vein, in greater graphic detail.

== See also ==
- Harakiri – film by Masaki Kobayashi
- Japanese funeral
- Jauhar, Rajput honor suicide by self-immolation
- Junshi – following the lord in death
- Kamikaze, Japanese suicide bombers
- Puputan, Indonesian ritual suicide
- Shame society
- Suicide in Japan
