= William Frederick Fead =

British naval officer (1809–1853)

William Frederick Fead (1809–1853) was a commander in the Royal Navy who played a key role in the ''Prometheus'' Incident, which caused a major strain on US-British relations concerning Central America, principally the area of the future Panama Canal.

== Career ==
The grandson of General George Fead, he joined the Royal Navy on June 9, 1824, and served for over 26 years. His first posting was under his uncle, Captain Francis Fead, R.N. After service as a midshipman and mate in several ships and sailing around the globe, he was promoted to lieutenant on June 28, 1838. The following year, he was appointed to the Curaçao 24 on the South American station and in 1840 to the Grecian on the Cape of Good Hope. Following several postings to other ships, he became flag-lieutenant of the Trafalgar and was promoted to commander on June 21, 1845, as a consequence of royal review by Queen Victoria at Spithead. Following that promotion, he served on two vessels in 1847, after which he was unemployed until he became commander of the Express 6 on July 3, 1851. That same year, Fead and the Express were involved in an incident on the Mosquito Coast involving Cornelius Vanderbilt that sparked a diplomatic crisis between the US and the UK.

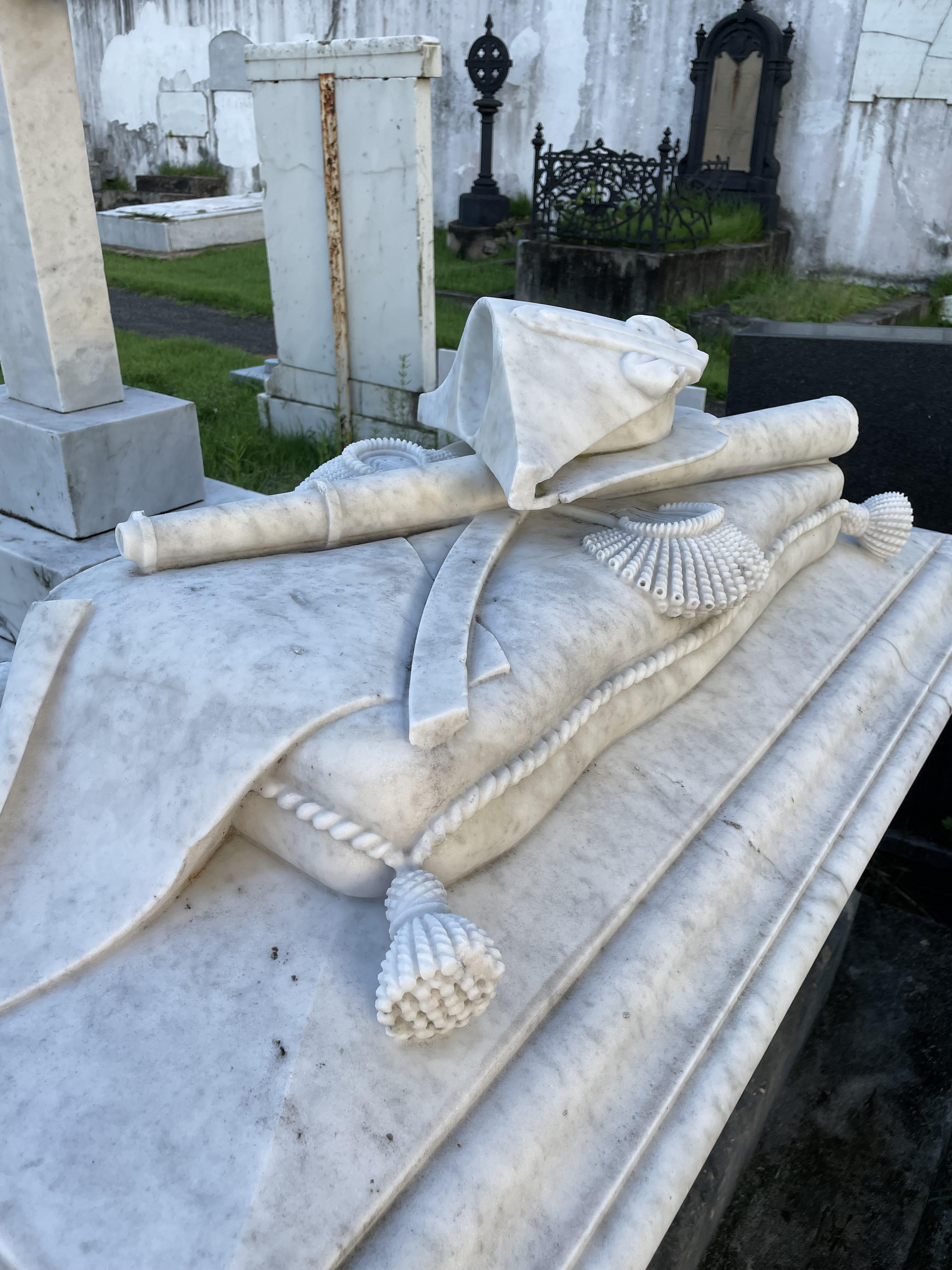
Detail of Commander Fead's tomb in the British Cemetery of Bahia

== Personal life ==
On August 1, 1843, Fead married Charlotte Rawlings, née Hillier, the widow of a lieutenant who had served in the 48th Regiment.

== The Prometheus Incident ==
One of the earliest tests of the Clayton–Bulwer Treaty, the Prometheus Incident arose from Cornelius Vanderbilt's refusal to pay customs duty in what was then Greytown – now San Juan de Nicaragua. Upon receiving a fifth such refusal, on November 21, 1851, the British resident, James Green, asked Commander Fead to provide physical assistance. Fead promptly maneuvered his ship into position and fired a live round across the bow of the Prometheus – an American vessel owned by the canal company – while Vanderbilt was on board.

After being forced to pay the customs duty, an enraged Vanderbilt returned to the US and inflamed anti-British sentiment in the press. President Millard Fillmore addressed the Senate on the matter on December 17, 1851. Fead's actions were found to be in violation of Article 1 of the Clayton–Bulwer Treaty.

Fead received a reprimand from British Vice-Admiral George F. Seymour, and later died of a "very short illness" on his way to Brazil. He was buried in the British Cemetery of Bahia on May 14, 1853. His tomb, paid for by a subscription raised among local merchants and members of his crew, is featured in a book on cemetery art by Clarival do Prado Valladares.

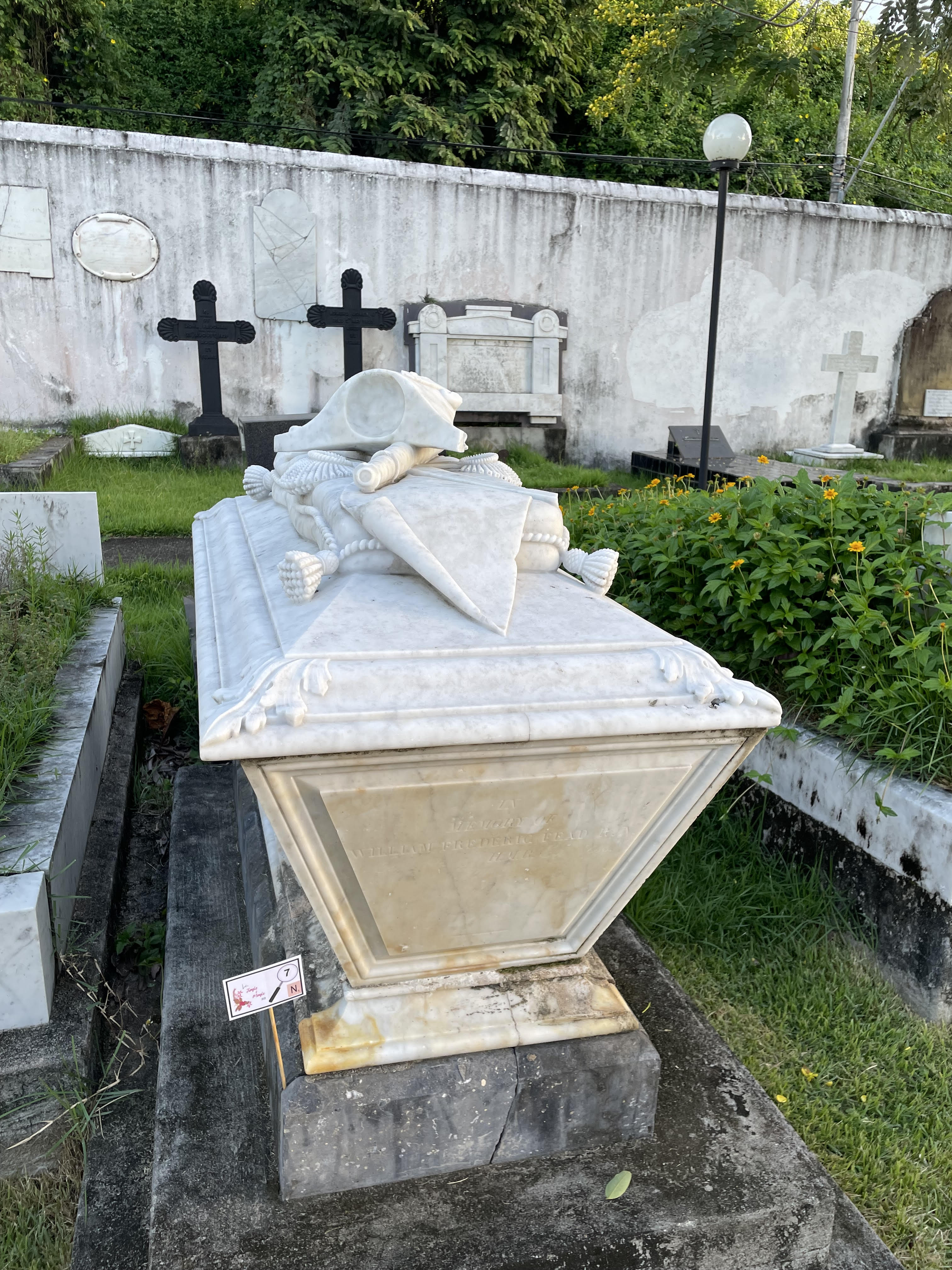
