= Avenida Sete de Setembro =

Coordinates: 12.9830°S 38.5155°W

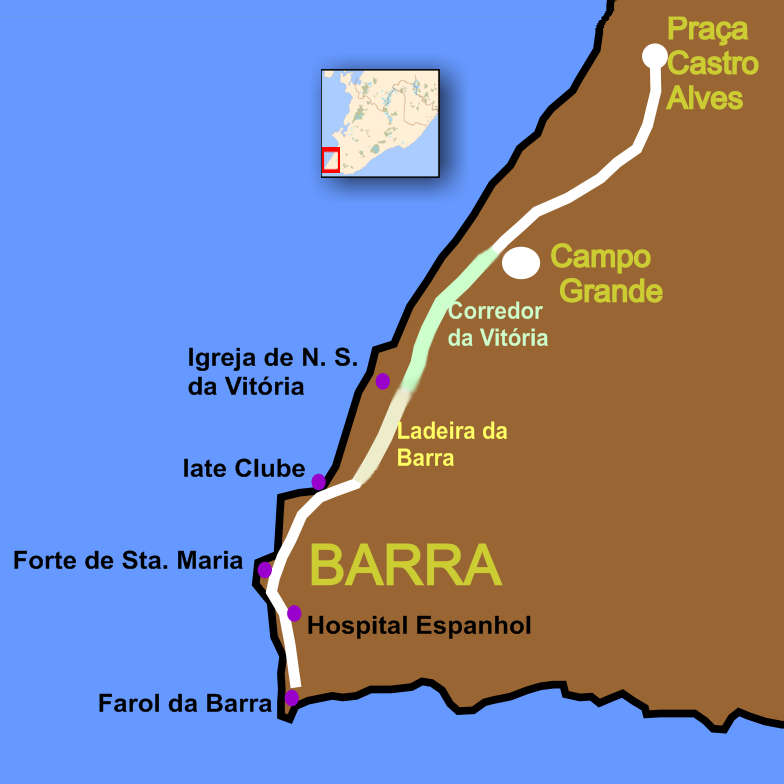
September Seven Avenue.

September Seven Avenue (Avenida Sete de Setembro in Portuguese) colloquially known as Seven Avenue (Avenida Sete in Portuguese) is an important road in the city of Salvador, Bahia, Brazil. It starts at the Farol da Barra (Barra Lighthouse), Barra (Neighborhood), and ends at Castro Alves Square (Praça Castro Alves), Historic Centre.

September Seven Avenue is the traditional route for many celebratory parades in the city of Salvador, Bahia, such as: carnival.

== See also ==
- São Pedro Clock
