= Salvador Metro =

Rapid transit system in Salvador, Brazil

Coordinates: 12.98306°S 38.49278°W

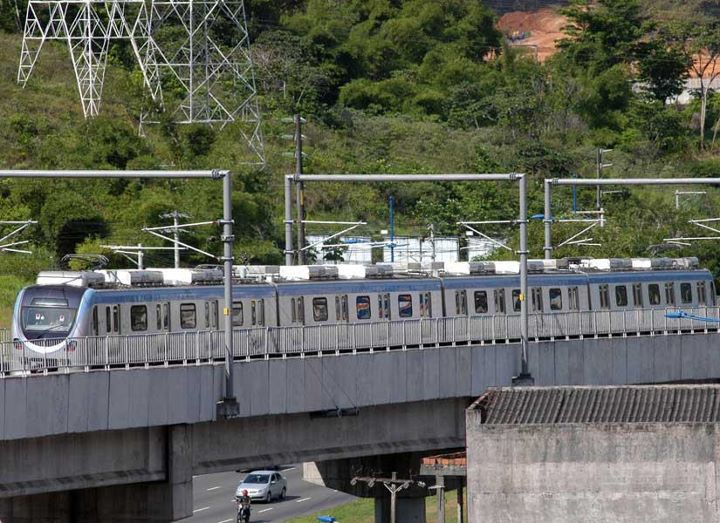
- A train on the Salvador Metro.

Overview
- Native name: Metrô de Salvador, Metrô Bahia
- Locale: Salvador, Bahia, Brazil
- Transit type: Rapid transit
- Number of lines: 2
- Line number: 2
- Number of stations: 22
- Website: CCR Metrô Bahia (in Portuguese)

Operation
- Began operation: 11 June 2014; 12 years ago
- Number of vehicles: 45

Technical
- Track gauge: 1,435 mm (4 ft 8 1/2 in) standard gauge
- Electrification: 3,000 V overhead lines

The Salvador Metro (Brazilian Portuguese: Metrô de Salvador, commonly called Metrô or Sistema Metropolitano Salvador-Lauro de Freitas) is a rapid transit system serving Salvador, the state capital of Bahia and the fifth largest city in Brazil. The current system is 38 kilometres (24 mi) long and has 22 stations, which began partial public service on June 11, 2014. The system also has a station at the Salvador Bahia Airport in Lauro de Freitas. The system is operated by CCR Metrô Bahia.

Additionally, Salvador was served by a 14-kilometre (8.7 mi) 1,000 mm (3 ft 3 3/8 in) metre gauge railway line known as the Suburban Line (Calçada-Paripe) that did not connect with the Metro. This suburban line will soon become an LRT line integrated to the 38 kilometres (24 mi) of the Metro.

The construction of the SMSL was carried out in an expansion divided in six stages that integrated the traditional center of the city to Pirajá (and later, in 2023, Campinas and the district of Águas Claras) and to the neighboring municipality of Lauro de Freitas through Line 1 and Line 2 respectively, totaling 38 kilometres (24 mi) and 22 stations.

The Metro connects to other transport systems such as the Salvador BRT, which is a bus rapid transit system which shares the Lapa station with the Metro, and the 36.4-kilometre (22.6 mi) and 34 station LRT line, which is currently being built to replace the suburban train, extend it, and predicted to be concluded by August 12, 2028, and will encounter the Metro at Águas Claras and Bairro da Paz stations.

== History ==
The result of the political fighting and contract conflicts caused the project to suffer multiple delays from its original completion date of 2003. In final form, the Bahia state government has taken over responsibility for finishing the line in 2013. When the service starts, it operated on the 7.6-kilometre (4.7 mi), five stop Lapa–Retiro portion of Line 1 between 12.00 and 16.00. Trains operated every ten minutes, and passenger travel were free. On game days, however, only football fans with game tickets were allowed in.

Nearly a decade have gone by after that first opening, and in Bahia's capital, circumstances have undergone a major shift.

On June 14 of this year, the 1.5-mile (2.4 km) Pirajá–Campinas section of Line 1 has opened, bringing the line's total length to 13.4 kilometres (8.3 mi), including 5.8 kilometres (3.6 mi) of elevated track and 1.4 kilometres (0.87 mi) of tunnel, with nine stations.

Starting in February 2015, construction on Line 2 was carried out. On December 5, 2016, the first 2.3-kilometre (1.4 mi) of the Acesso Norte–Rodoviária extend opened. With the conclusion of the 3.5-kilometre (2.2 mi) Mussurunga–Airport section on April 26, 2018, Line 2 includes twelve stations and is now 19.6 kilometres (12.2 mi) long. Both lines' services operate from 5:00 to 0:00, with service frequency modified according to demand.

== Background ==
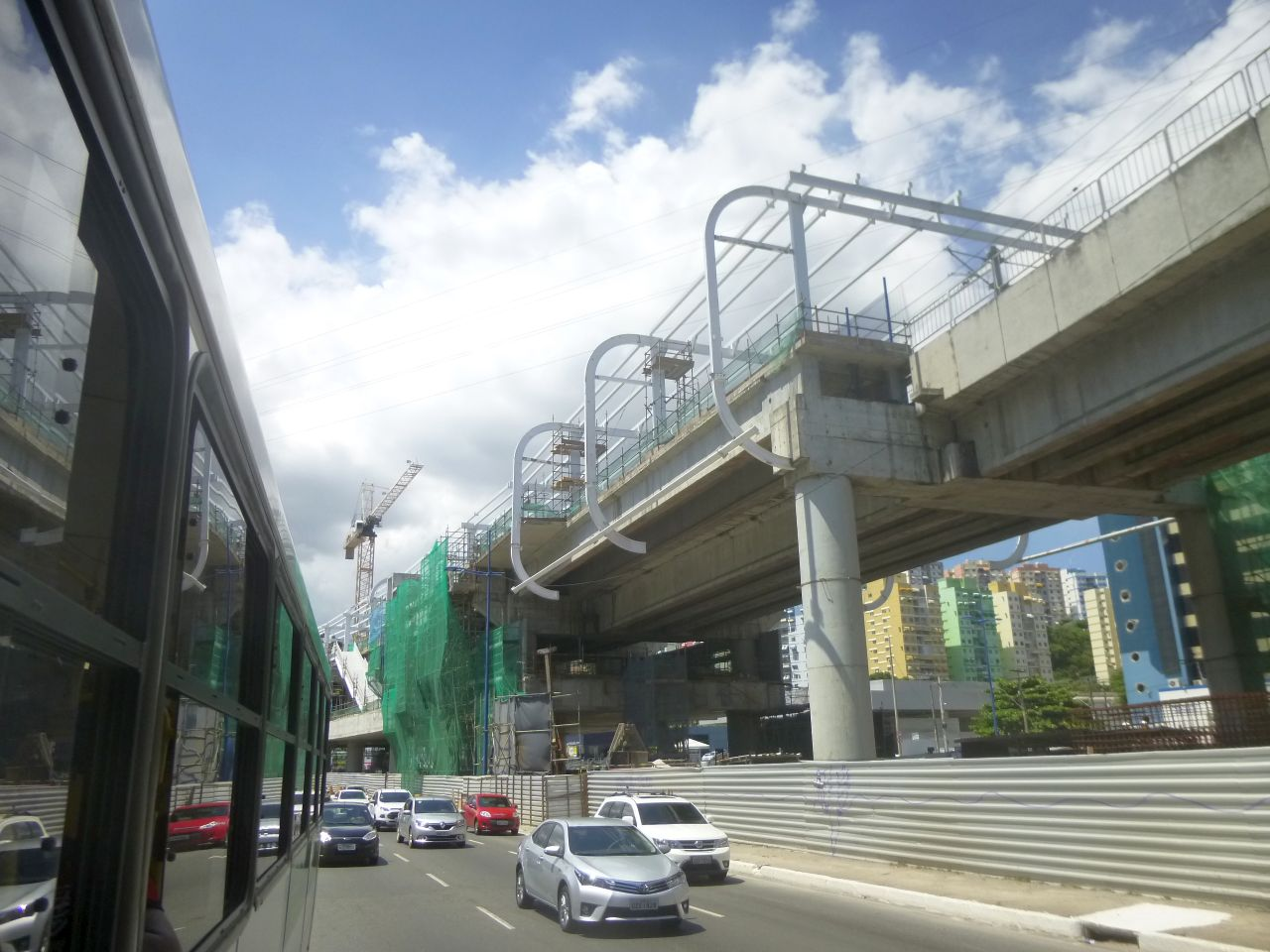
Construction of Bonocô Station Elevation.

The project is a Build, Operate, and Transfer (BOT) scheme for the operation of the urban transportation system in Salvador, and includes the supply and installation of rolling stock and signaling equipment, and commercial operation of the system for the 25-year concession. Each train, consisting of four cars, has the capacity to carry 1,250 passengers.

Currently, the urban transportation system in Salvador is underdeveloped and largely road-based, causing significant congestion and delays. This level of road-based transport has significant impacts on the local economy and environment. For this reason the municipality and the state, together with the World Bank, have been involved since 1992 in the design and implementation of a transportation strategy. The international standard gauge is 3 kV overhead power supply, and was built by a consortium of Siemens, Camargo Corrêa, and Andrade Gutierrez of Brazil.

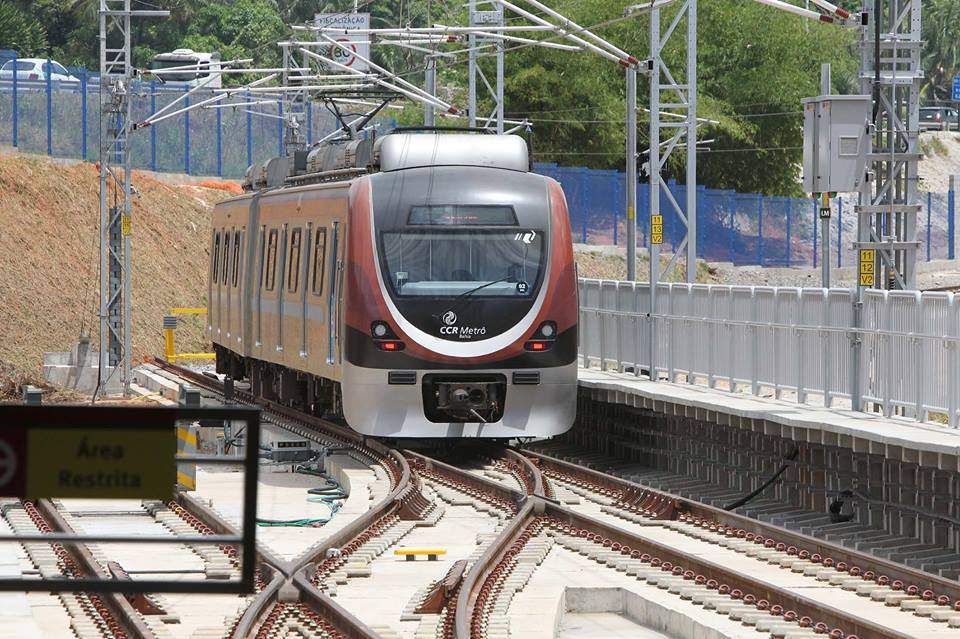
Train of Salvador metro.

This project is an integral part of the strategy that aims to improve the quality of public transportation in the area by connecting currently excluded low-income neighborhoods, and by furthering the development of a fully integrated urban transportation system.

Salvador Metro is one of the systems of urban mobility that were deployed for the 2014 FIFA World Cup. The connection of Line 2 with Line 1 of Salvador Metro contributes to connect the International Airport to Downtown Salvador and the Fonte Nova Stadium. The new Line 2 of Salvador Metro integrates the metro stations of the Rótula do Abacaxi and the beach city of Lauro de Freitas in the metropolitan area, passing through the Salvador International Airport, with the Airport metro station.

== Operations ==
=== Route ===
Map of current and future lines.

The current route of Line 1 begins at the underground Lapa station, and runs for 1.4 kilometres (0.87 mi) in Metro tunnels, before emerging to the surface. Brotas station (which serves the Itaipava Arena Fonte Nova stadium) is elevated, while Accesso Norte Station and Retiro stations are at-grade.

With Line 1 fully operational over its whole course from Lapa to Rodoviária as of December 2023, it is 17-kilometre (11 mi) long (with 1.4 kilometres (0.87 mi) underground, 5.8 kilometres (3.6 mi) elevated, with the rest at grade), and serves ten stations.

A new bus station for Salvador has begun the operations by 20th of January 2026. With this modification, the Rodoviária station, located on Tancredo Neves avenue, got a new name: Iguatemi station. Also, Águas Claras station has changed to Rodoviária station, where the new bus station is built near the BR-324 federal highway.

=== Stations ===
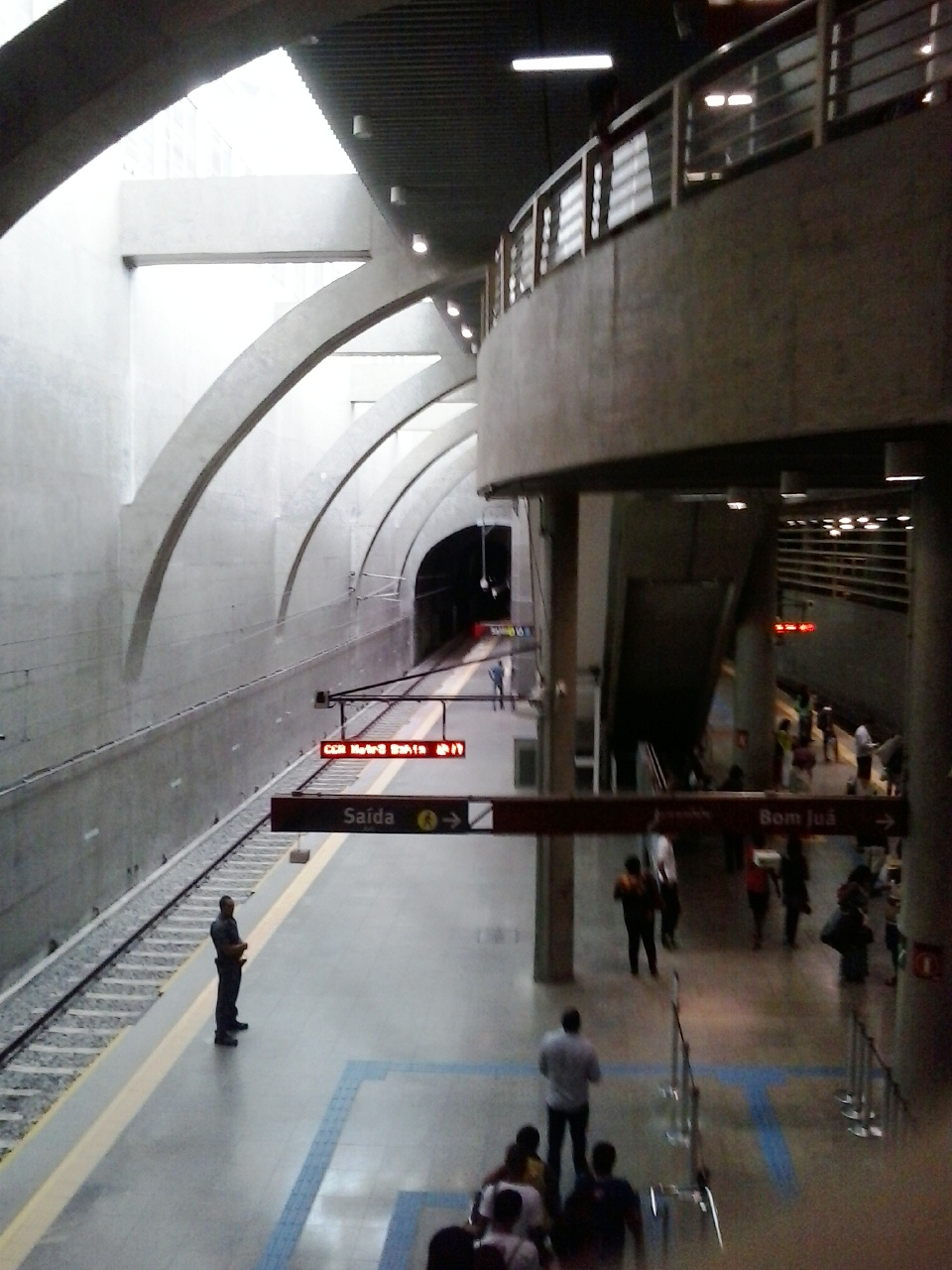
Lapa Station, in the downtown of city.

The following lists the current, and planned, stations of the Salvador Metro, by their opening date:

Station	Line	Opening date	Notes
Lapa	1	11 June 2014	Access by Bus Terminal of Lapa ("Terminal Rodoviário da Lapa"), in operation
Campo da Pólvora	1	11 June 2014	Access by two sides of Dom Pedro II Square ("Praça Dom Pedro II"), in operation
Brotas	1	11 June 2014	Access by Av. Mario Leal Ferreira or by Rua das Pitangueiras, in operation
Bonocô	1	13 November 2015	In operation
Accesso Norte	1 & 2	11 June 2014	Access by walkway of Shopping Bela Vista and BR-324 Highway, in operation
Retiro	1	25 August 2014	Access by Baixa de Santo Antônio Street, in operation
Bom Juá	1	23 April 2015	in operation
Pirajá	1	22 December 2015	In operation
Detran	2	5 December 2016	In operation
Iguatemi	2	5 December 2016	In operation
Pernambués	2	23 May 2017	In operation
Imbuí	2	23 May 2017	In operation
CAB	2	23 May 2017	In operation
Pituaçu	2	23 May 2017	In operation
Flamboyant	2	11 September 2017	In operation
Tamburugy	2	11 September 2017	In operation
Bairro da Paz	2	11 September 2017	In operation
Mussurunga	2	11 September 2017	In operation
Aeroporto	2	26 April 2018	In operation
Campinas	1	14 June 2023	In operation
Rodoviária	1	26 December 2023	In operation
Lauro de Freitas	2	TBD	Planned
Campo Grande	1	TBD	Planned

== Gallery ==
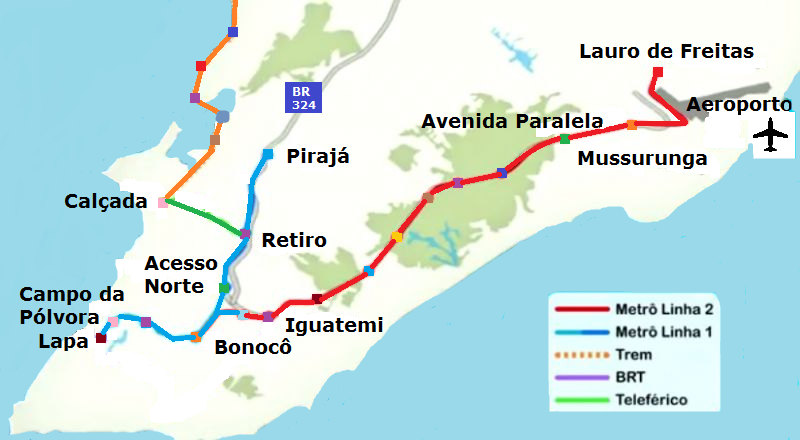

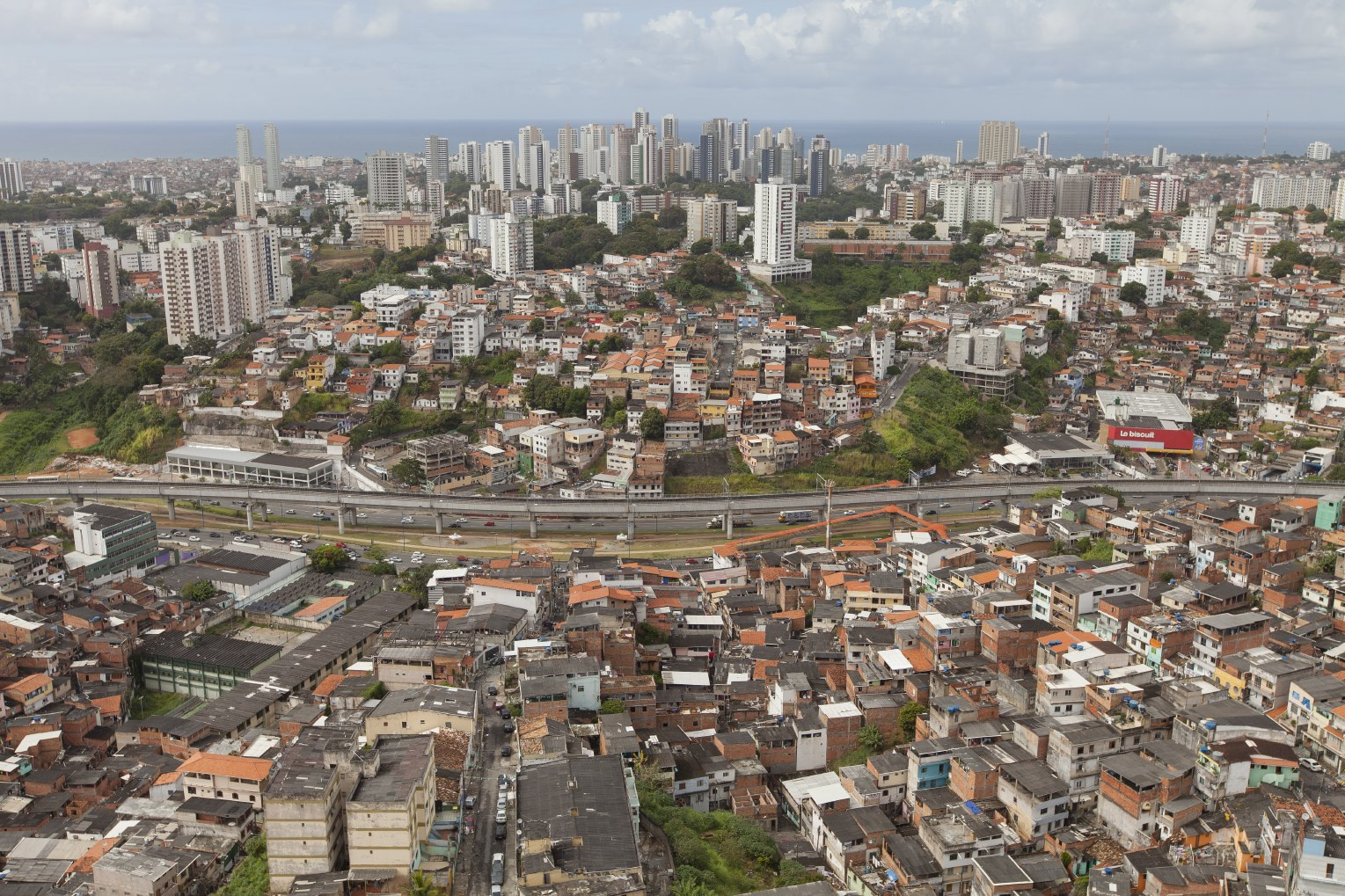

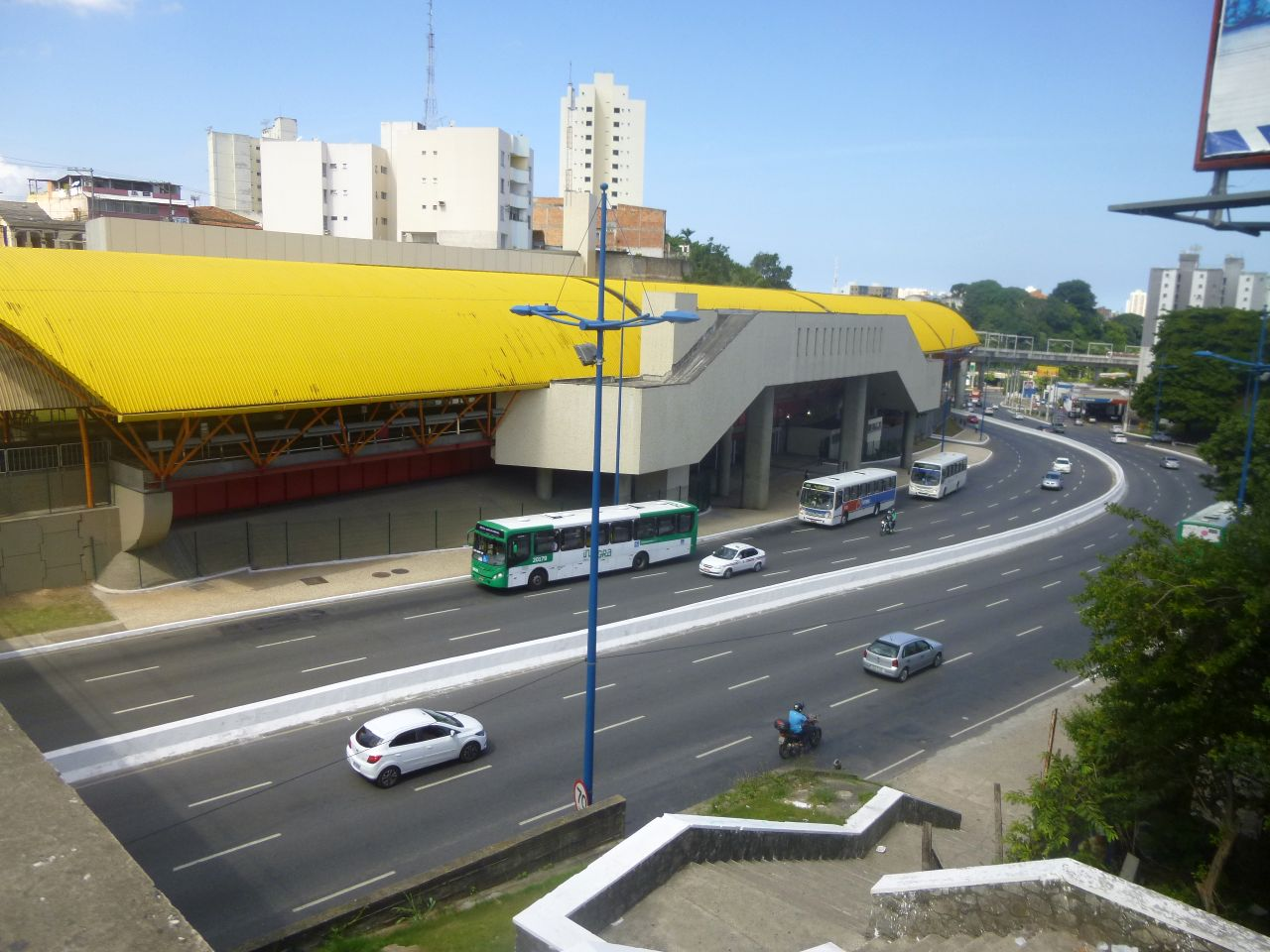

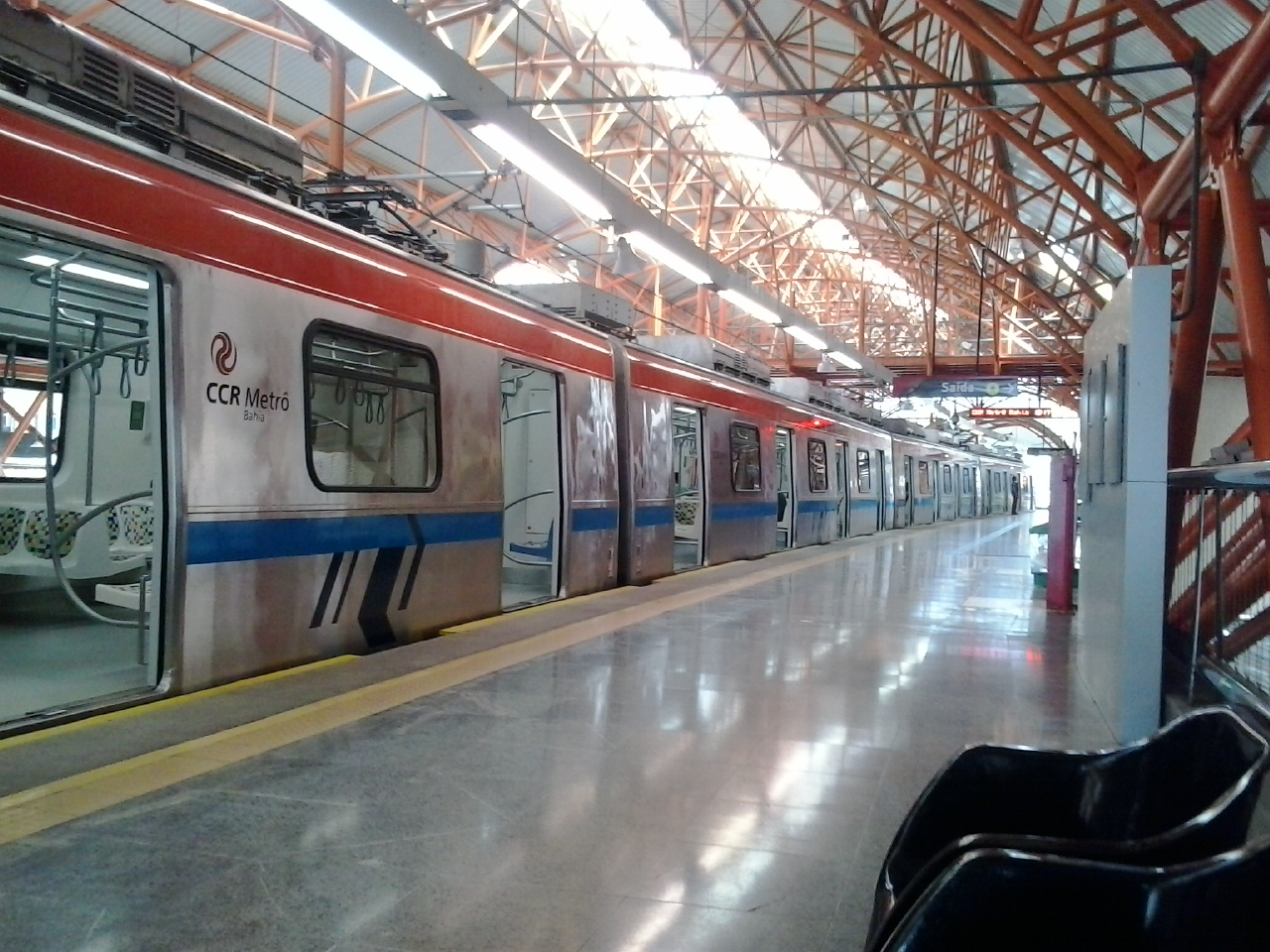

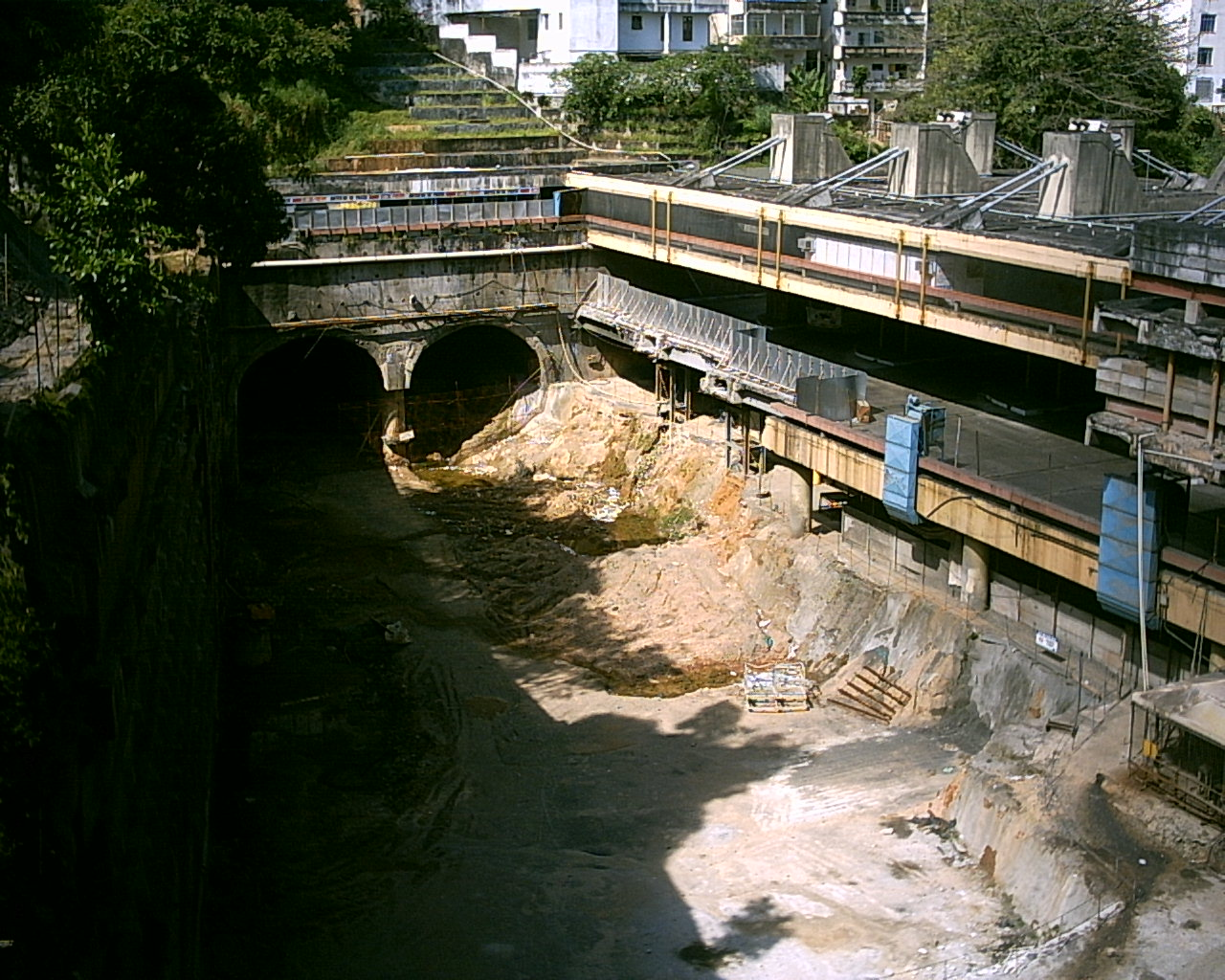

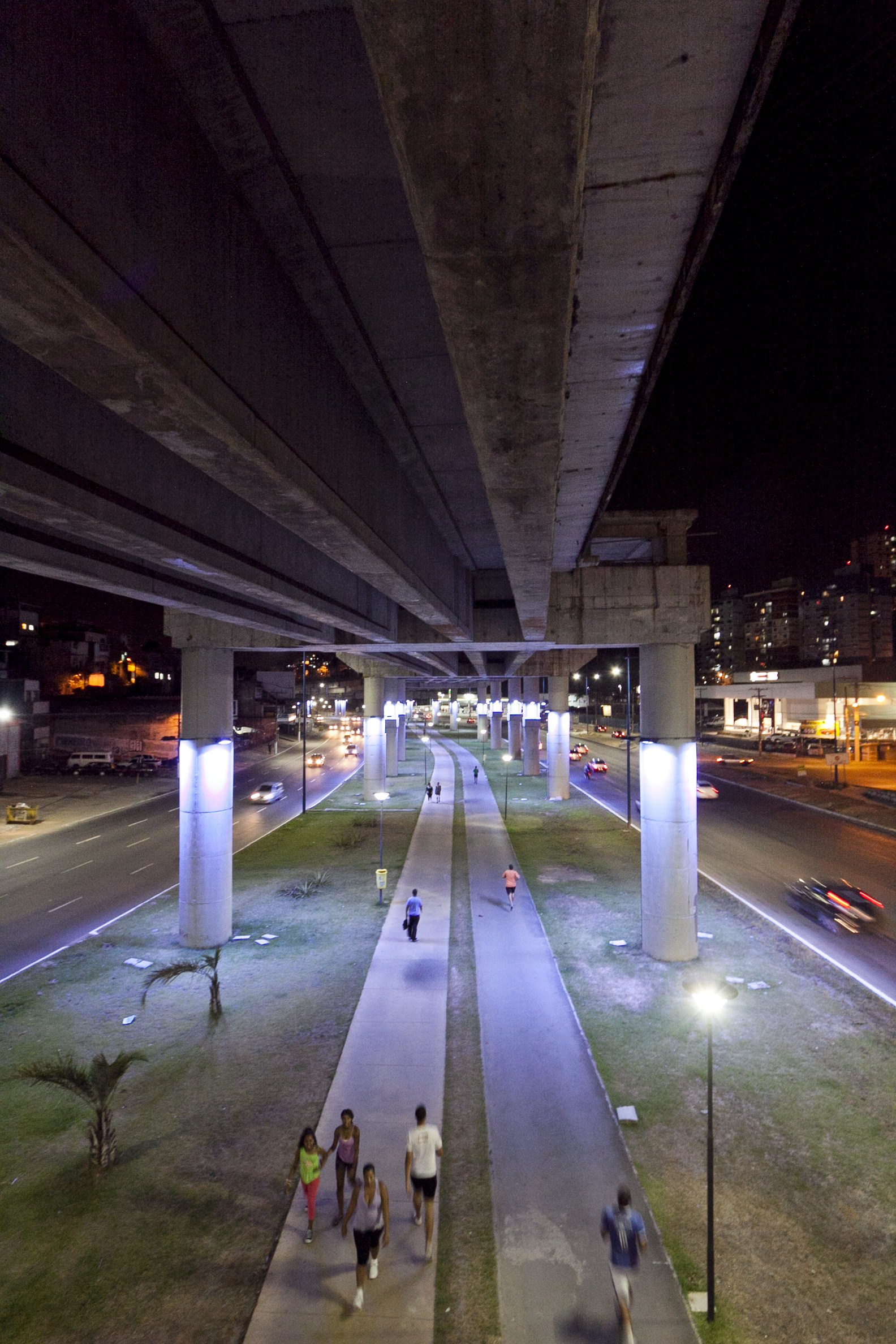

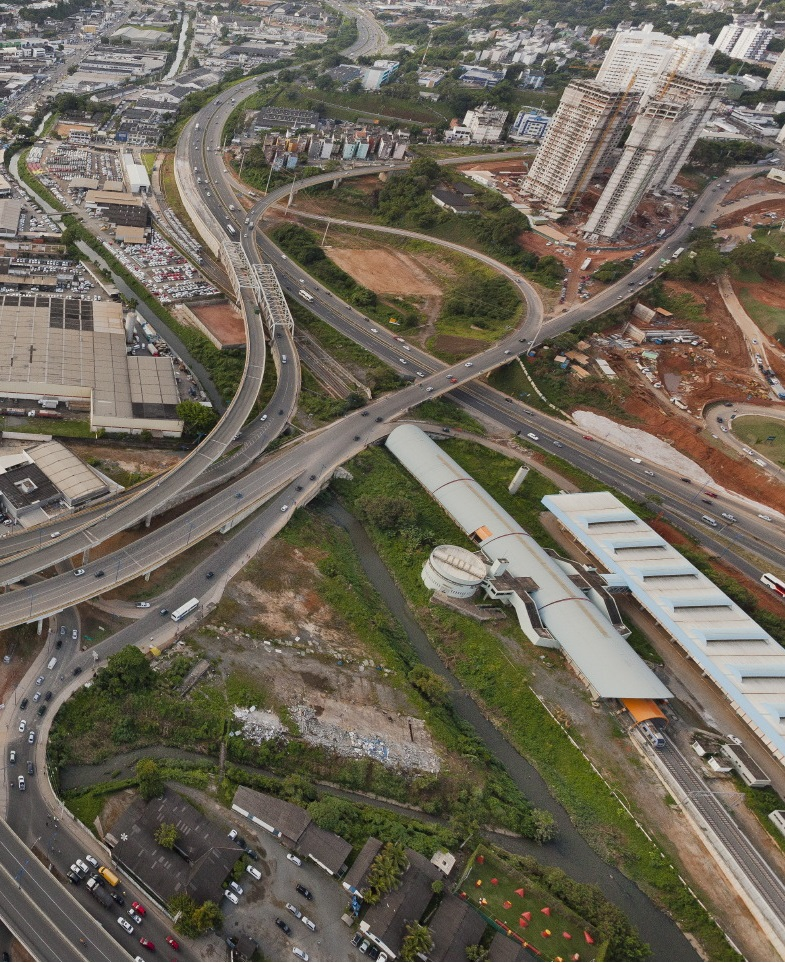

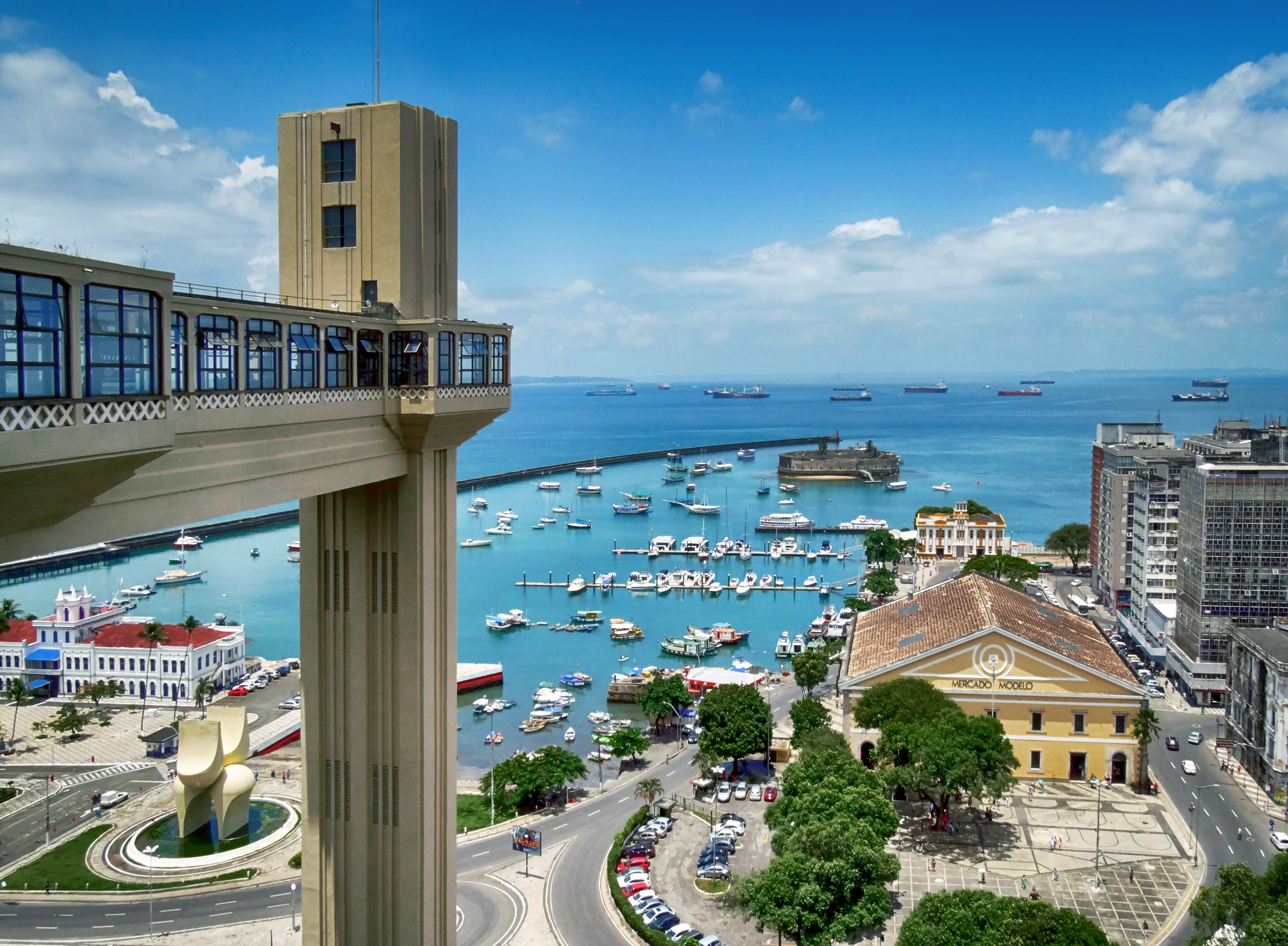

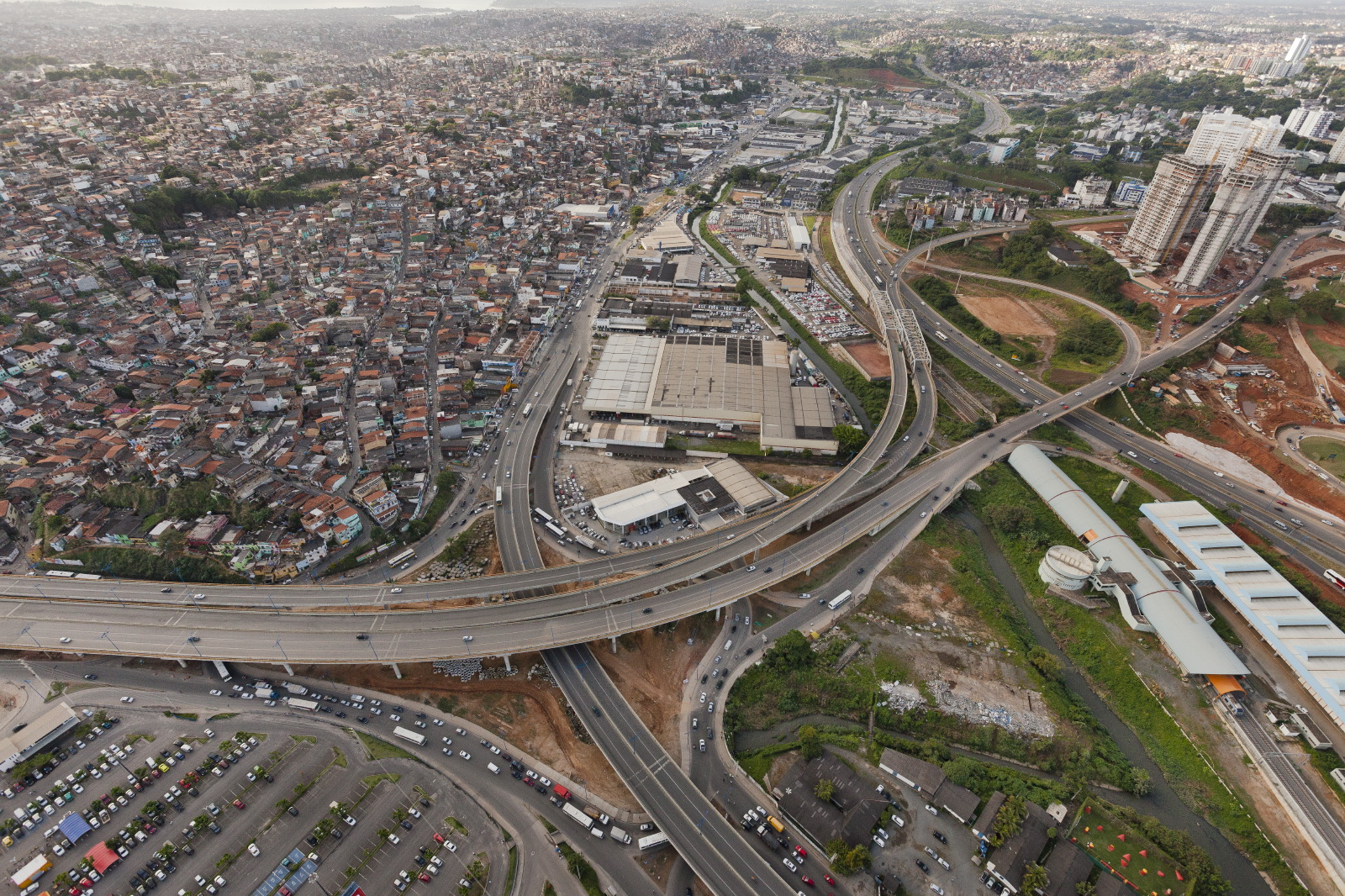

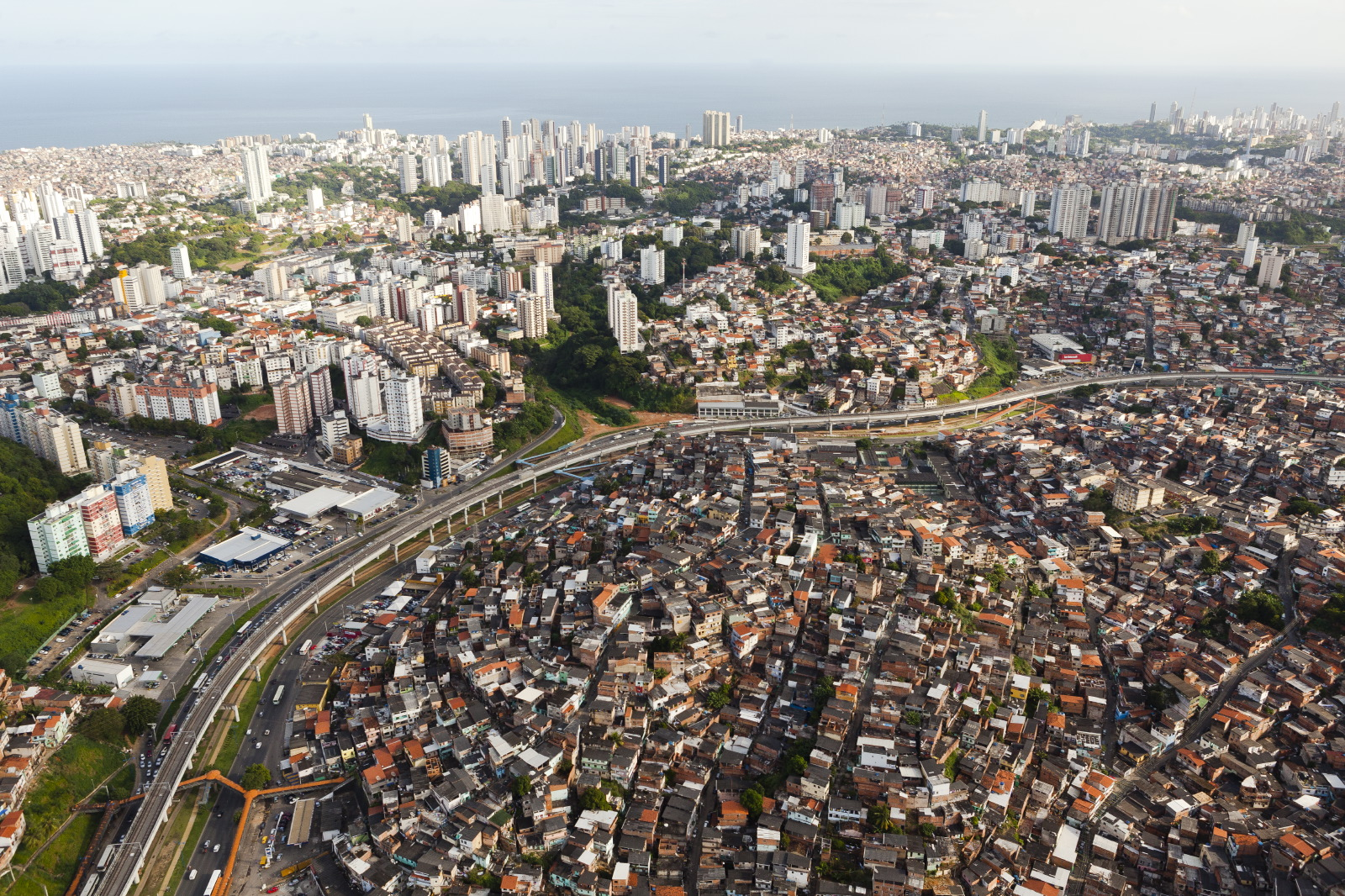

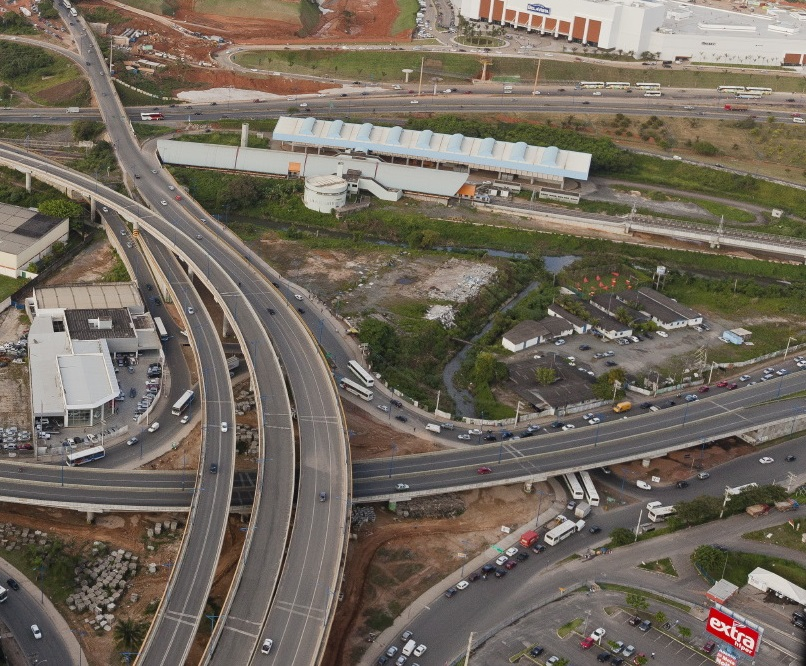

== See also ==
- List of metro systems
- Rapid transit in Brazil
