= Itaigara (neighbourhood) =

Coordinates: 12°59′S 38°28′W

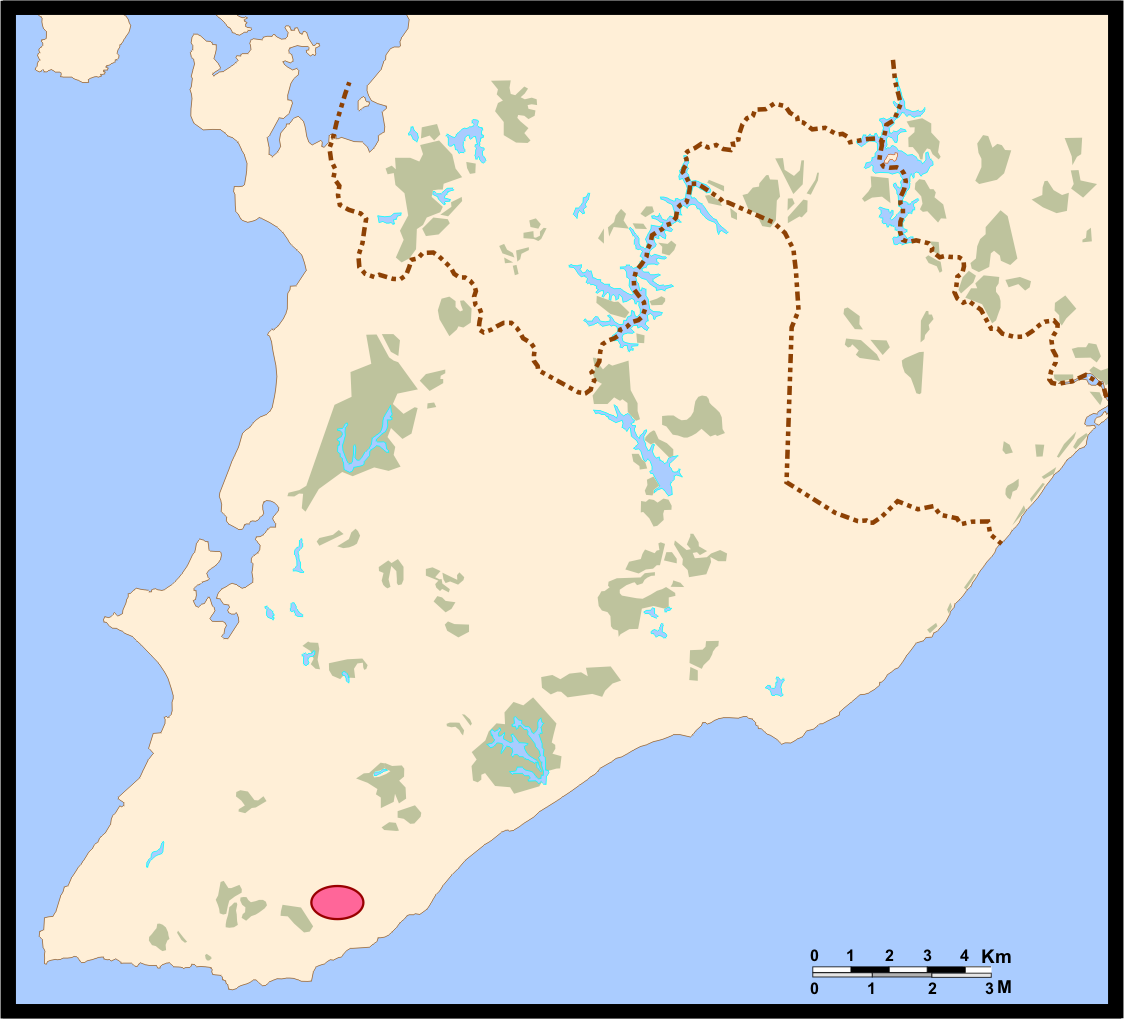
Location of Itaigara.

Itaigara is a neighbourhood located in the southeastern zone of Salvador, Bahia. Modern and bold lies in a region "noble" of the capital Bahia, inhabited mainly by people with high purchasing power.

Owes its name to the indigenous origin and means "of stone canoe" (Ita: "stone"; Igaram: "boat" or "water lady").

Surrounded by trees, modern and luxurious buildings, in addition to extensive fields, the Itaigara has shopping malls, companies, laboratories, bars, supermarkets and schools. It is adjacent to Park City and Iguatemi Shopping Mall. It is entoured by the neighbourhoods of Pituba, Caminho das Árvores, Brotas and Santa Cruz.
