= Pituba (neighbourhood) =

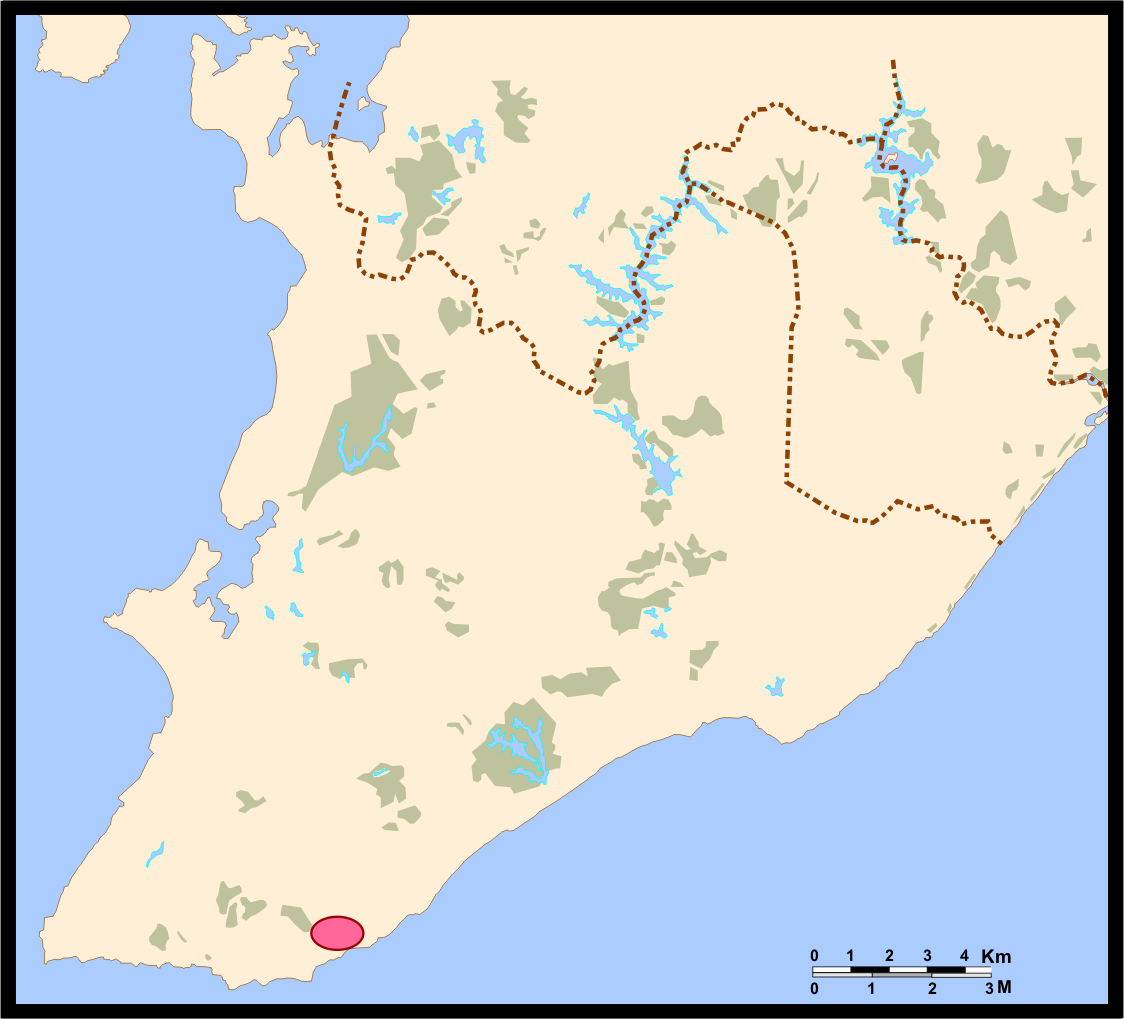
Location of Pituba.

Pituba is a large upper class neighborhood located in the southeastern zone of Salvador, Bahia. Its main routes, the Avenues Manoel Dias da Silva and Paul VI. Pituba's name is indigenous origin and means "breath, breath, sea".

== History ==
At the beginning of the twentieth century, Joventino Pereira da Silva, along with his brother-in-law Manoel Dias da Silva, bought the farm Pituba, and together they sketched out the plan City Light. Joventino, which was mining, has brought with it the idea to deploy in a Pituba equal to the modern structure of Belo Horizonte, with blocks divided strategically, wide streets and many beautiful spaces for housing. The project of blending was published in 1919, with a report signed by the civil engineer Teodoro Sampaio, and approved by the City of Salvador in 1932. The rummage of the land established the opening of 10 routes parallel to the shoreline, some of which were denominated boulevards, and 15 cross perpendicular to the first. It was established in a document of 1915 that the mainstream of the streets, then known as Estrada's Pituba, would be called Avenida Manoel Dias da Silva, formalized by the Municipal Law No 1664 of December 2, 1964. After the creation of Avenida Manoel Dias da Silva and all other transverse and longitudinal, the neighborhood did not stop growing. And there will be 87 years. Step by step, the Pituba was born like this: after the work of Joventino and Manoel Dias (above), came the construction of the Avenue Otávio Mangabeira, on the edge, which carried the name of the then governor. Only in the 1960s, Nelson Oliveira, mayor of Salvador, covered the asphalt streets of Pituba. Work just completed in the following decade.

Precisely at the turn of the decade from 60 to 70 was that there was verticalization and the process of expansion, with the construction of the Avenue ACM and large real estate ventures, such as Our Lady of Light Park and Park Condominium Julio Caesar. Then came the Park City, the division of Trees Road, the Shopping Iguatemi (1975) which was the first shopping mall to be built in northeastern Brazil, the Mall Itaigara (1977), among many others. In the 80s and 90s Avenida Tancredo Neves consolidated itself as the new economic center of the city, na Avenida Paulista "Bahia. In 1999, the Avenida Manoel Days went through a reform, having extended its sidewalks and street lighting, giving it a more cosmopolitan air and becoming one of the most valued neighborhoods of the capital Bahia, being recognized for their services and various shops.

== Pituba area ==
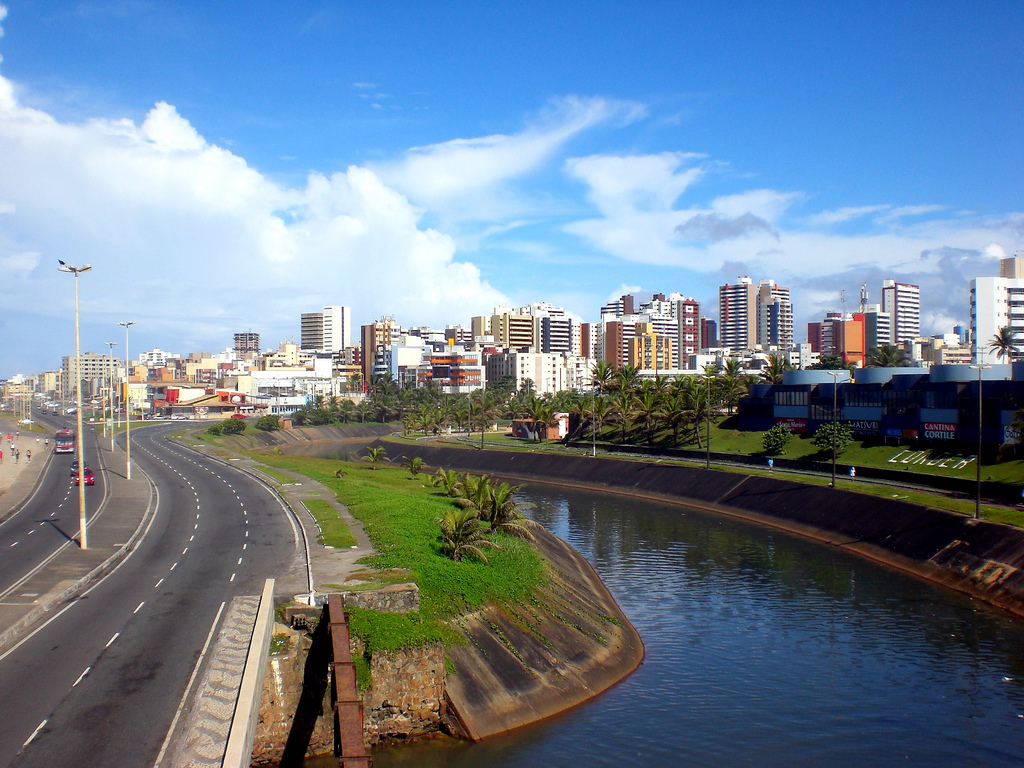
View of modern Pituba.

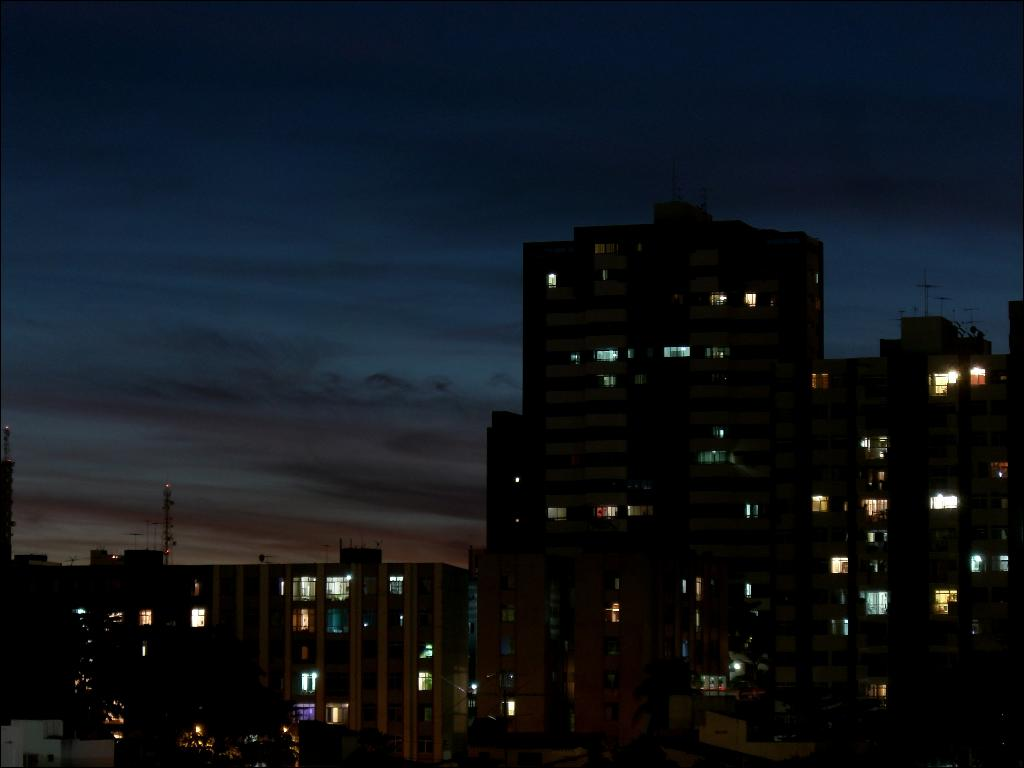
Pituba at night.

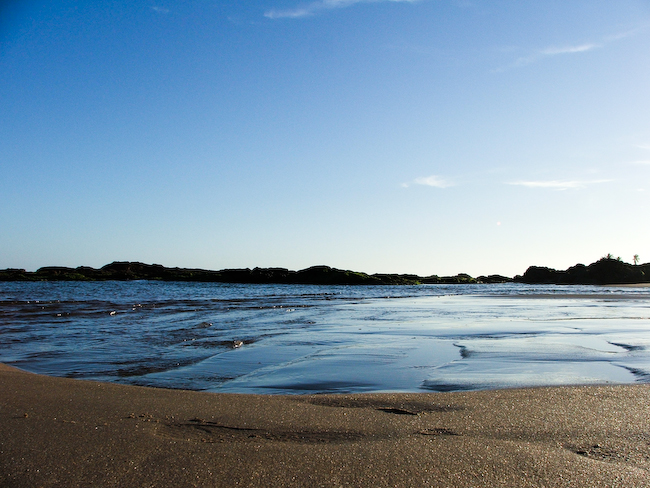
Pituba Beach.

=== Ventures ===
It has the main high school in the city, such as the Military College of Salvador, the Anchieta School, the Gregor Mendel School, the Portinari School and the Módulo School. In addition, the headquarters of the Post Office is located in this region. There is also a wide variety of bars and banks. Since the 1970s has shown (similarly to the neighboring districts of Itaigara and Iguatemi) strong population growth through enterprise development.

=== Trade ===
Pituba is a major commercial district, with a wide range of businesses and services, including shopping centres, office buildings, hotels, banks, restaurants, bookstores, boutiques, educational institutions, and other retail establishments. Several of the city’s principal shopping centres are located in the neighbourhood.

=== Entertainment and Leisure ===
The Pituba, in addition to the various plazas and the City Park, has a myriad range of options for leisure and entertainment: bars, restaurants, theaters, galleries, nightclubs, among others. Pituba has access roads to other parts of the city: Otávio Mangabeira Avenue, Manoel Dias da Silva Avenue, ACM Avenue, Paulo VI Avenue, and Avenue Juraci Magalhaes Magalhaes Neto.

=== Numbers and microregions ===
Today the neighborhood account with 25 boulevards (besides the great avenues) and more than 150 streets. The estimated population is around 250,000 people.

Locations that are part of the Administrative Region VIII Pituba:

- Ampl. Parque Nossa Senhora da Luz
- Boulevard
- Caminho das Árvores
- Condomínio Iguatemi
- Iguatemi
- Itaigara
- Jardim América
- Lot. Aquárius
- Lot. Vela Branca
- Parque dos Flamboyans
- Parque Júlio César
- Parque Nossa Senhora da Luz
- Parque São Vicente
- Correios
- Salvador Shopping
