= CCR Metrô Bahia =

Brazilian company operating public rail transport

- Type: Private
- Industry: Rail transportation
- Founded: September 9, 2013; 13 years ago in Salvador, Bahia, Brazil
- Headquarters: Salvador
- Website: http://www.ccrmetrobahia.com.br/

CCR Metrô Bahia is a privately held Brazilian company based in Salvador, Bahia. It holds the public concession for the Salvador and Lauro de Freitas Metro System for three decades (until 2043), granted by the Government of the State of Bahia. Its CEO is Luis Valença. The company is a special-purpose entity created by CCR S.A., which is composed of the companies Andrade Gutierrez, Mover Participações and Soares Penido. The first two companies, along with Siemens, formed the Metrosal consortium (Salvador Metro), which was initially responsible for the construction of the Salvador metro and was accused of overpricing by the Federal Court of Accounts (TCU).

== History ==
The metro system tender was launched on April 24, 2013. Its resumption and completion were budgeted at around four billion reais, originating from the federal government (through PAC 2), the state government and the concessionaire. The tender was opened in the form of a public-private partnership for a thirty-year concession (three years for construction and the rest for operation), the winner being the one that presents the lowest price. On August 19, Companhia de Participações em Concessões (CPC), from CCR S.A., was the only one to submit a proposal and offered a discount of 5.05%. Then, the company was incorporated on September 9 and the concession contract was signed by the three entities on the morning of October 15. At an extraordinary general meeting held on December 20, 2013, it was decided to change the company's name from Companhia do Metrô de Salvador to Companhia do Metrô da Bahia and to move from its address on Avenida Tancredo Neves, in the Caminho das Árvores neighborhood, to the vicinity of the Pirajá Station facilities. In February 2014, it had subscribed share capital of 200,000,000.00 reais.

CCR S.A.'s operations in Salvador pointed to the group's expansion throughout the rest of Brazil, previously restricted to São Paulo, Rio de Janeiro, and Paraná, as well as into the passenger transport sector. Metrô Bahia was the group's third venture in this area, in which it already operated with the concessionaires ViaQuatro (metro) and CCR Barcas (waterway). The construction of the Salvador metro was highlighted, along with other concessions obtained, in an advertising campaign celebrating the group's fifteenth anniversary in early 2014. In the middle of the same year, the company joined the Associação Nacional dos Transportadores de Passageiros sobre Trilhos (ANPTrilhos), which includes almost all metro-rail operators in the country.

At a board meeting on February 2, 2015, the resignation of then-CEO Harald Zwetkoff was accepted, and Luis Valença, from Bahia, who was working on another metro line operated by Motiva, the São Paulo Metro Line 4 (Yellow) (ViaQuatro), was elected as the new CEO. He will complete the term of the resigning CEO, which ends on September 17, 2015.

In July 2015, the company began registering entrepreneurs interested in leasing 60 spaces for the sale of products and services within the stations. The areas offered for the installation of kiosks or shops range from 4 to 15 square meters, with rental prices between 3,000 and 10,000 reais and contracts with terms between three months and two years. In an interview in October 2015, the owner of the Bahia-based pizza chain Torre de Pizza stated that he had signed a contract with CCR Metrô Bahia to install kiosks selling pizza slices in the fast-food model in the metro stations, whose franchises are called Torre de Pizza Express.

At the end of 2015, the National Bank for Economic and Social Development (BNDES) approved a loan of 2 billion reais for the company, necessary for the continuation of the works, operation, and acquisition of rolling stock. This long-term loan also paid off a previous (bridge loan) of 406 million reais, also destined for SMSL.

In September 2016, its headquarters in the Pirajá Complex hosted the first ordinary general assembly of 2016 and the 5th meeting of the Board of Directors of ANPTrilhos.

In a comparison between 2017 and 2018, the company achieved growth of almost two thousand percent in net profit (from R$1.931 million to R$40.292 million) and a 53% decrease in operating revenue (from R$2.159 billion to R$1.006 billion), as a result of the completion of works scheduled under the concession contract.

== CEOs ==
- Harald Peter Zwetkoff (founder – February 2, 2015)
- Luis Augusto Valença de Oliveira (February 2, 2015–present)
