= Caminho das Árvores =

Neighborhood in Salvador, Brazil

- Neighborhood
- Location within Brazil
- Coordinates: 12°59′S 38°28′W
- Country: Brazil
- State: Bahia
- City: Salvador

Caminho das Árvores is a neighborhood located in the southeastern zone of Salvador, Bahia in Brazil. This neighborhood is a mixed of residential and trade area, with majority presence of wealthy classes.
